= Adelaide city centre =

Central area of Adelaide, South Australia

Adelaide City Centre Tarndanya
- Suburb
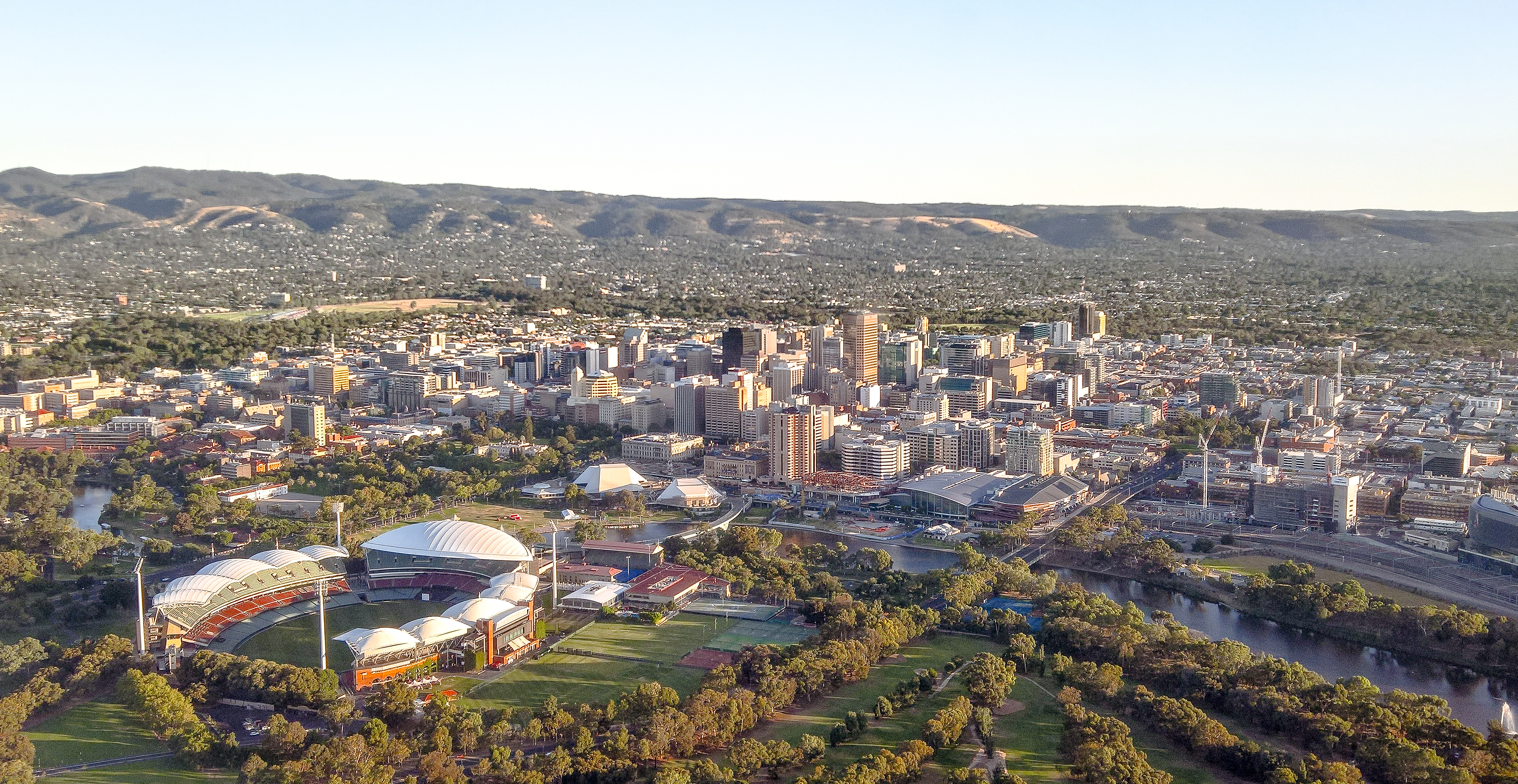
- Adelaide City Centre with Adelaide Oval and the Adelaide Festival Centre in view (2015)

- Interactive map of Adelaide City Centre
- Country: Australia
- State: South Australia
- Region: Eastern Adelaide
- City: Adelaide
- Location: 5 km (3.1 mi) E of Adelaide Airport; 12 km (7.5 mi) SE of Port Adelaide; 9 km (5.6 mi) NE of Glenelg
- Established: 1837

Government
  - State electorate: Adelaide
  - Federal division: Adelaide

Area
  - Total: 10.5 km^{2} (4.1 sq mi)

Population
  - Total: 18,202 (SAL 2021)
- Postcode: 5000
Suburbs around Adelaide City Centre
Hindmarsh	North Adelaide	Gilberton; Hackney
Southwark; Thebarton; Mile End	Adelaide City Centre	Kent Town; Rose Park; Dulwich
Keswick; Wayville	Unley; Parkside	Eastwood; Glenside

Adelaide city centre (Kaurna: Tarndanya) is the city centre of Greater Adelaide, the capital city of South Australia. It is known by locals simply as "the City" or "Town" to distinguish it from Greater Adelaide and from the City of Adelaide local government area. The residential population was 18,202 in the 2021 census, with a local worker population of 130,404.

Adelaide city centre was planned in 1837 on a greenfield site following a grid layout, with streets running at right angles to each other. It covers an area of 4.33 square kilometres (1.67 square miles) and is surrounded by 6.68 square kilometres (2.58 square miles) of park lands. (Note: The area of the park lands quoted is based, in the absence of an official boundary between the City and North Adelaide, on an east–west line past the front entrance of Adelaide Oval.) Within the city are five parks: Victoria Square in the exact centre and four other, smaller parks.

Names for elements of the city centre are as follows:

- The "city square mile" (in reality 1.67 square miles or 4.33 square kilometres) is the constructed area bordered by North, East, South and West Terraces.
- The "central business district" (CBD) is an alternative term, but more accurately describes the intensively developed northern half of the city, which contains a multitude of commercial, cultural and entertainment premises, restaurants and high-rise apartments. The southern, lower-density half mainly contains small businesses, restaurants and, residentially, a mix of mansions, houses and conserved 19th-century cottages, and (fewer) high-rise apartments.
- Precincts such as the West End and the East End have distinctive characters. CBD shopping precincts include Rundle Mall and Adelaide Central Market.
- In what is often described as the "North Terrace cultural precinct", many educational, cultural, entertainment and medical institutions lie between the northern side of North Terrace and the River Torrens – notably university campuses, the Adelaide Festival Centre, and the Parliament of South Australia. Adelaide railway station is also located there.

== History ==
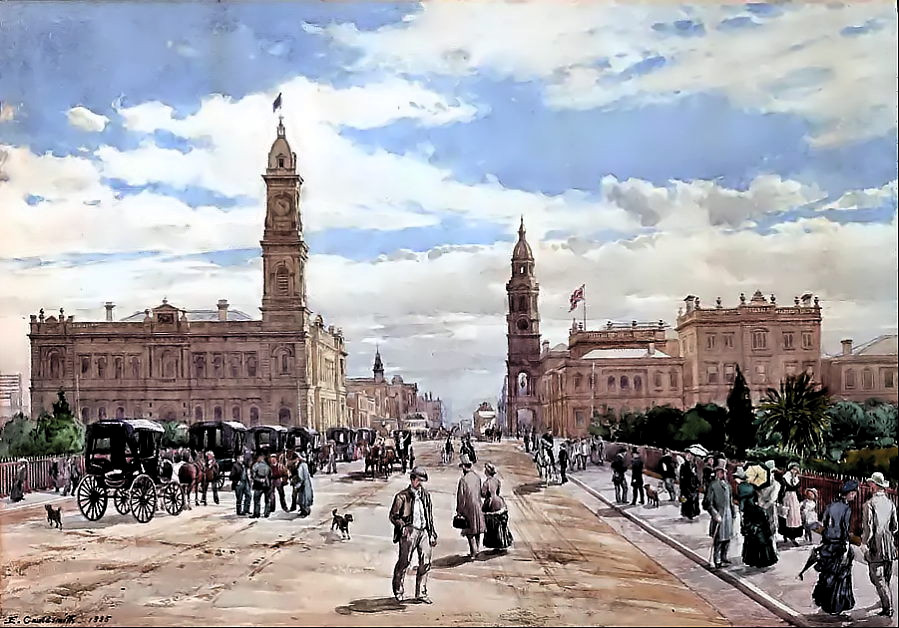
King William Street in 1885, by Edmund Gouldsmith, depicting the GPO and Town Hall

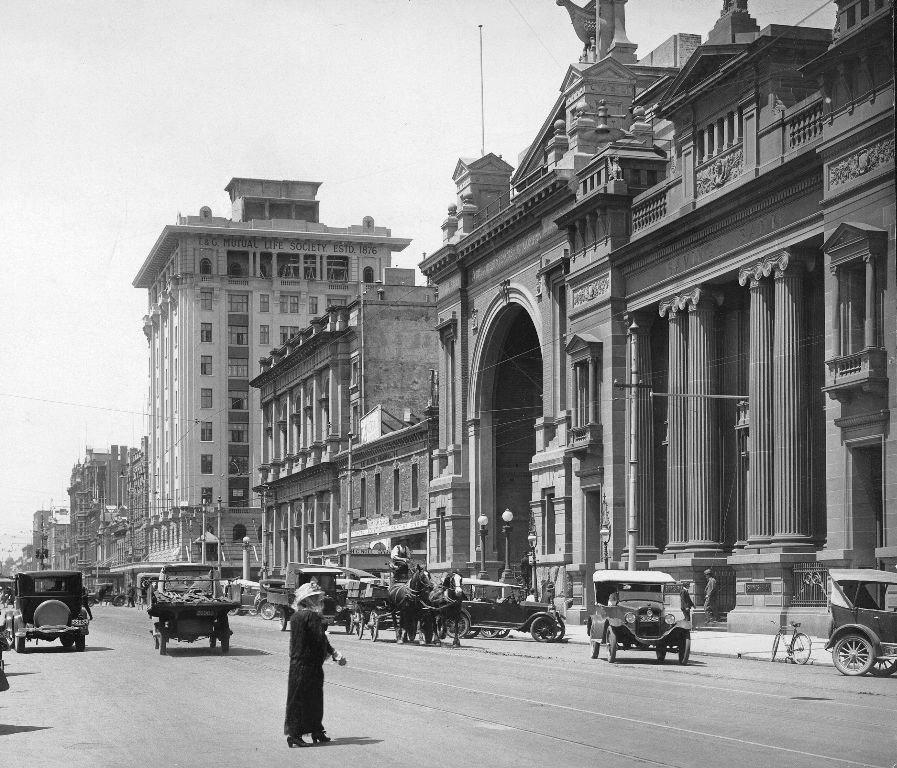
Currie Street looking east, c. 1925

Before the British colonisation of South Australia, the Adelaide Plains, on which Adelaide was built, were home to the Kaurna group of Aboriginal Australians. The colony of South Australia was established in 1836 at Glenelg, and the city itself established in 1837. The location and characteristic grid layout of the city and North Adelaide, as well as the surrounding parklands, were the result of the work of Colonel William Light (1786–1839), who was the first Surveyor General of South Australia. The area where the Adelaide city centre now exists was once known as "Tarndanya", the Kaurna word for as "male red kangaroo rock", which was the name used for an area along the south bank of what is now known as the River Torrens (Karrawiri Pari), which flows through Adelaide.

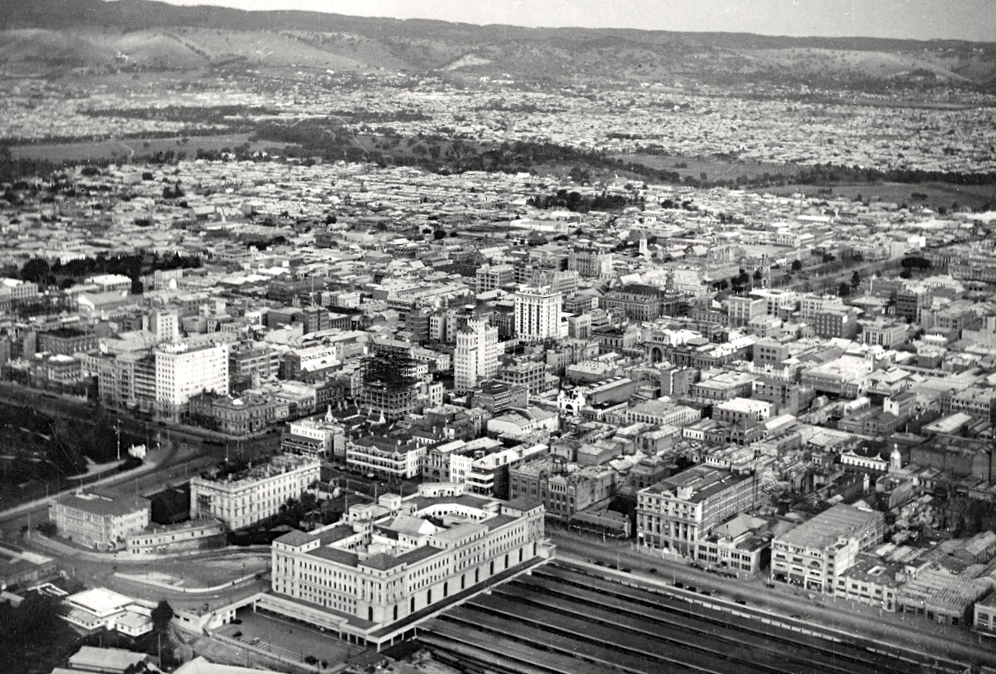
This view shows about 60 per cent of the city centre, and the south-eastern suburbs and Adelaide Hills in 1935

Adelaide was not as badly affected by the 1860s economic depression in Australia as other gold rush cities like Sydney and Melbourne, allowing it to prosper. Historian F.W. Crowley noted that the city was full of elite upper-class citizens which provided a stark contrast to the grinding poverty of the labour areas and slums outside the inner city ring. Due to its historic wealth during the 20th century, the city retains a notable portion of Victorian architecture.

== Town planning ==
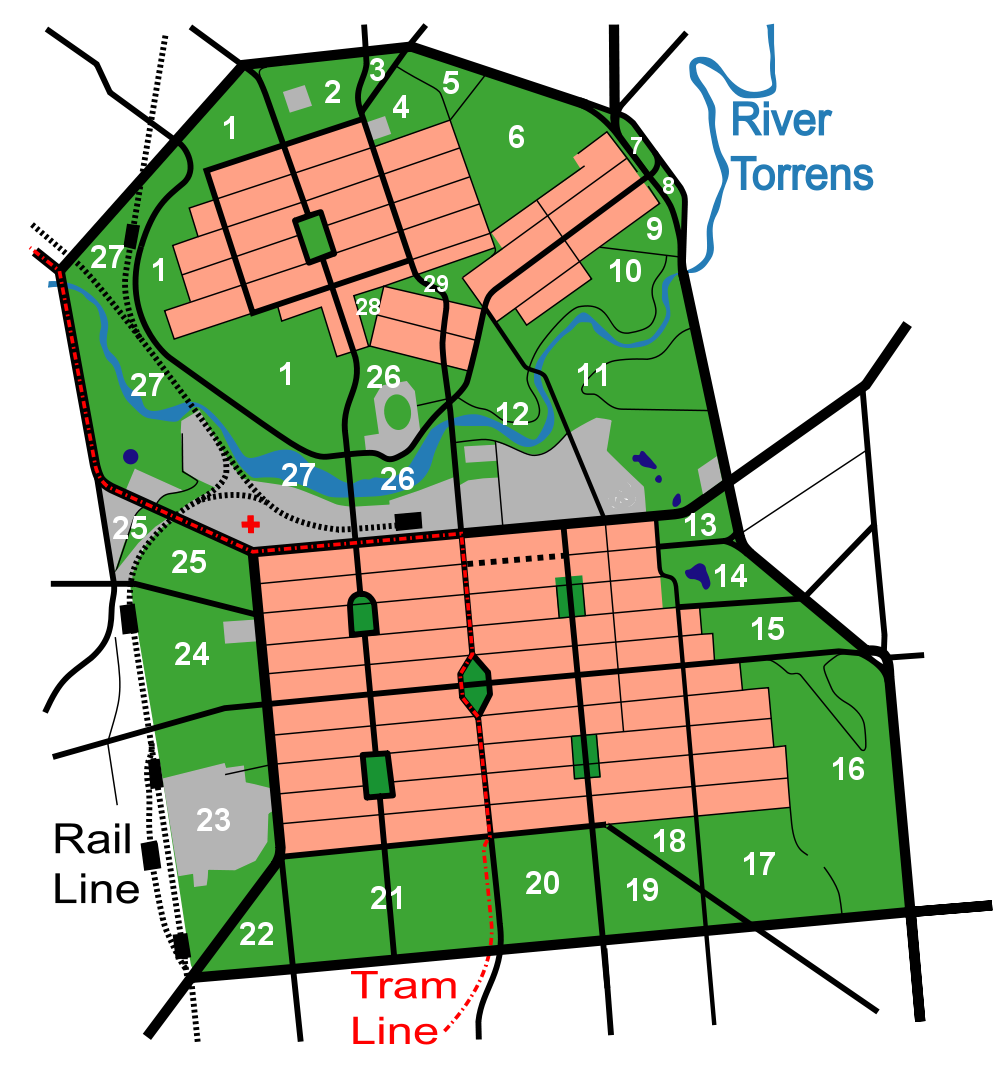
Adelaide city centre, North Adelaide and the Park Lands

Adelaide is separated from its greater metropolitan area by a ring of public parklands on all sides. The so-called "square mile" within the park lands is defined by a small area of high rise office and apartment buildings in the centre north, around King William Street, which runs north-to-south through the centre. Surrounding this central business district are a large number of medium to low density apartments, townhouses and detached houses which make up the residential portion of the city centre.

=== Layout ===
The layout of Adelaide, sometimes referred to as "Light's Vision", features a cardinal direction grid pattern of wide streets and terraces and five large public squares: Victoria Square in the centre of the city, and Hindmarsh, Light, Hurtle and Whitmore Squares in the centres of each of the four quadrants of the Adelaide city centre. These squares occupy 32 of the 700 numbered town acre allotments on Light's plan.

All east–west roads change their names as they cross King William Street, except for North and South terraces. They also alternate between being wide and narrow, 99 and 66 feet (30 and 20 m), except for the central Grote and Wakefield which are extra-wide, 132 feet (40 m), along with the surrounding four terraces. In the south half of the city, in several places the Adelaide City Council has constructed wide footpaths and road markings to restrict traffic to a lesser number of lanes than the full width of the road could support.

The street pairs, design widths, and town acres in Light's Vision are illustrated in this diagram:

W e s t T e r r a c e	North Terrace																																		E a s t T c e										132 ft
W e s t T e r r a c e	1	2	3	4	5	6	7	8	M o r	9	10	11	12	13	14	15	16	K i n g	17	18	19	20	21	22	23	24	P u l	25	26	27	28	29	30	31	E a s t T c e
W e s t T e r r a c e	62	61	60	59	58	57	56	55	M o r	54	53	52	51	50	49	48	47	K i n g	46	45	44	43	42	41	40	39	P u l	38	37	36	35	34	33	32	E a s t T c e
W e s t T e r r a c e	Hindley								M o r	Street								K i n g	Rundle								P u l	Street							E a s t T c e										66 ft
W e s t T e r r a c e	63	64	65	66	67	68	69	70	M o r	71	72	73	74	75	76	77	78	K i n g	79	80	81	82	83	84	85	86	P u l	87	88	89	90	91	92	93	E a s t T c e
W e s t T e r r a c e	124	123	122	121	120	119	118	Light Square			115	114	113	112	111	110	109	K i n g	108	107	106	105	104	103	102	Hind- marsh Square			99	98	97	96	95	94	E a s t T c e
W e s t T e r r a c e	Currie							Light Square			Street							K i n g	Grenfell							Hind- marsh Square			Street						E a s t T c e										99 ft
W e s t T e r r a c e	125	126	127	128	129	130	131	Light Square			134	135	136	137	138	139	140	K i n g	141	142	143	144	145	146	147	Hind- marsh Square			150	151	152	153	154	155	E a s t T c e
W e s t T e r r a c e	186	185	184	183	182	181	180	Light Square			177	176	175	174	173	172	171	K i n g	170	169	168	167	166	165	164	Hind- marsh Square			161	160	159	158	157	156	E a s t T c e
W e s t T e r r a c e	Waymouth								p h e t t	Street								K i n g	Pirie								t e n e y	Street																	66 ft
W e s t T e r r a c e	187	188	189	190	191	192	193	194	p h e t t	195	196	197	198	199	200	201	202	K i n g	203	204	205	206	207	208	209	210	t e n e y	211	212	213	214	215	216	217	218	H u t t S t r e e t	219
W e s t T e r r a c e	252	251	250	249	248	247	246	245	p h e t t	244	243	242	241	240	239	238	237	K i n g	236	235	234	233	232	231	230	229	t e n e y	228	227	226	225	224	223	222	221	H u t t S t r e e t	220
W e s t T e r r a c e	Franklin								p h e t t	Street								K i n g	Flinders								t e n e y	Street								H u t t S t r e e t									99 ft
W e s t T e r r a c e	253	254	255	256	257	258	259	260	p h e t t	261	262	263	264	265	266	267	Victoria Square			270	271	272	273	274	275	276	t e n e y	277	278	279	280	281	282	283	284	H u t t S t r e e t	285	286
W e s t T e r r a c e	320	319	318	317	316	315	314	313	p h e t t	312	311	310	309	308	307	306	Victoria Square			303	302	301	300	299	298	297	t e n e y	296	295	294	293	292	291	290	289	H u t t S t r e e t	288	287
W e s t T e r r a c e	Grote Street																Victoria Square			Wakefield Street																H u t t S t r e e t									132 ft
W e s t T e r r a c e	321	322	323	324	325	326	327	328	B r o w n	329	330	331	332	333	334	335	Victoria Square			338	339	340	341	342	343	344	H a n s o n	345	346	347	348	349	350	351	352	H u t t S t r e e t	353	354	355	356
W e s t T e r r a c e	392	391	390	389	388	387	386	385	B r o w n	384	383	382	381	380	379	378	Victoria Square			375	374	373	372	371	370	369	H a n s o n	368	367	366	365	364	363	362	361	H u t t S t r e e t	360	359	358	357
W e s t T e r r a c e	Gouger								B r o w n	Street								W i l l i a m S t	Angas								H a n s o n	Street								H u t t S t r e e t							E a s t		99 ft
W e s t T e r r a c e	393	394	395	396	397	398	399	400	B r o w n	401	402	403	404	405	406	407	408	W i l l i a m S t	409	410	411	412	413	414	415	416	H a n s o n	417	418	419	420	421	422	423	424	H u t t S t r e e t	425	426	427	428	429	430	E a s t
W e s t T e r r a c e	468	467	466	465	464	463	462	461	B r o w n	460	459	458	457	456	455	454	453	W i l l i a m S t	452	451	450	449	448	447	446	445	H a n s o n	444	443	442	441	440	439	438	437	H u t t S t r e e t	436	435	434	433	432	431	E a s t
W e s t T e r r a c e	Wright								B r o w n	Street								W i l l i a m S t	Carrington								H a n s o n	Street								H u t t S t r e e t							E a s t		66 ft
W e s t T e r r a c e	469	470	471	472	473	474	475	Whit- more Square			478	479	480	481	482	483	484	W i l l i a m S t	485	486	487	488	489	490	491	Hurtle Square			494	495	496	497	498	499	500	H u t t S t r e e t	501	502	503	504	505	506	E a s t
W e s t T e r r a c e	544	543	542	541	540	539	538	Whit- more Square			535	534	533	532	531	530	529	W i l l i a m S t	528	527	526	525	524	523	522	Hurtle Square			519	518	517	516	515	514	513	H u t t S t r e e t	512	511	510	509	508	507	E a s t
W e s t T e r r a c e	Sturt							Whit- more Square			Street							W i l l i a m S t	Halifax							Hurtle Square			Street							H u t t S t r e e t								T c e	99 ft
W e s t T e r r a c e	545	546	547	548	549	550	551	Whit- more Square			554	555	556	557	558	559	560	W i l l i a m S t	561	562	563	564	565	566	567	Hurtle Square			570	571	572	573	574	575	576	H u t t S t r e e t	577	578	579	580	581	582	583	T c e
W e s t T e r r a c e	622	621	620	619	618	617	616	615	S t	614	613	612	611	610	609	608	607	W i l l i a m S t	606	605	604	603	602	601	600	599	S t	598	597	596	595	594	593	592	591	H u t t S t r e e t	590	589	588	587	586	585	584	T c e
W e s t T e r r a c e	Gilbert								S t	Street								W i l l i a m S t	Gilles								S t	Street								H u t t S t r e e t								T c e	66 ft
W e s t T e r r a c e	623	624	625	626	627	628	629	630	S t	631	632	633	634	635	636	637	638	W i l l i a m S t	639	640	641	642	643	644	645	646	S t	647	648	649	650	651	652	653	654	H u t t S t r e e t	655	656	657	658	659	660	661	T c e
W e s t T e r r a c e	700	699	698	697	696	695	694	693	S t	692	691	690	689	688	687	686	685	W i l l i a m S t	684	683	682	681	680	679	678	677	S t	676	675	674	673	672	671	670	669	H u t t S t r e e t	668	667	666	665	664	663	662	T c e
W e s t T e r r a c e	South Terrace																																											T c e	132 ft
132 ft									99 ft									132 ft									99 ft									132 ft								132 ft	(width)

=== Street and square names ===
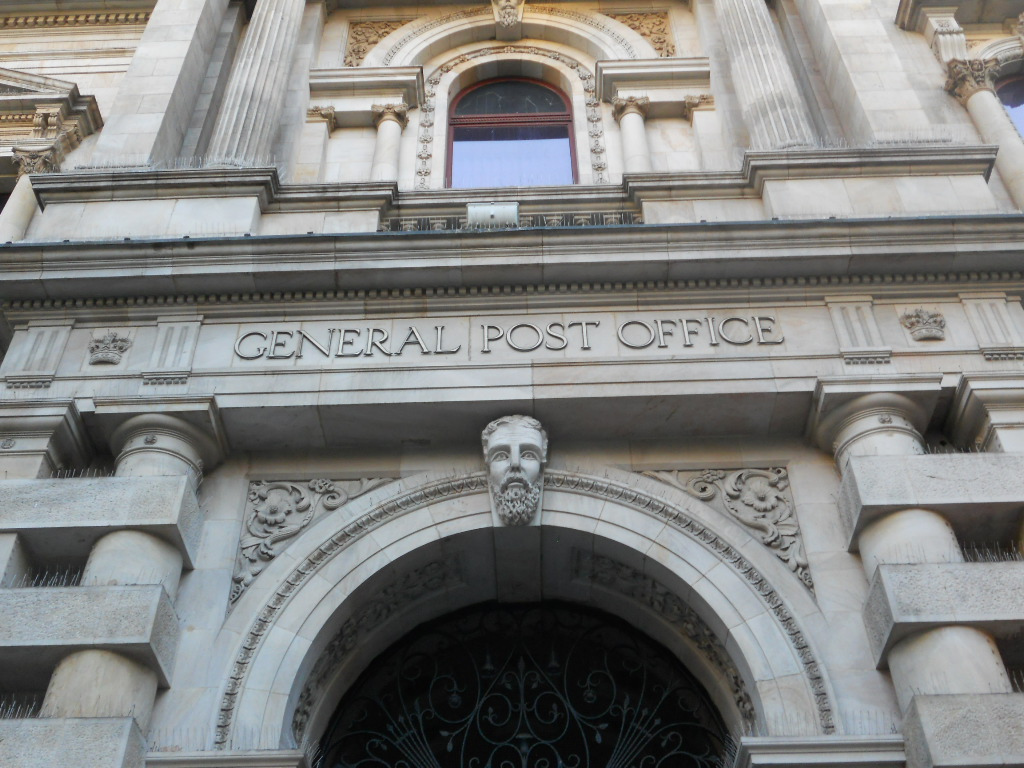
Architectural detail of the former Adelaide General Post Office on King William Street

The streets and squares were named by a committee of a number of prominent settlers after themselves, after early directors of the South Australian Company, after Colonisation Commissioners of South Australia (appointed by the British government to oversee implementation of the acts that established the colony), and after various notables involved in the establishment of the colony.

The Street Naming Committee comprised:

- Governor Hindmarsh
- Judge Jeffcott
- James Hurtle Fisher (Resident Commissioner)
- Robert Gouger (Colonial Secretary)
- Colonel Light (Surveyor General)
- John Brown (Emigration officer)
- Osmond Gilles (Treasurer)
- Thomas Gilbert (Colonial Storekeeper)
- John Morphett
- John Barton Hack
- Edward Stephens (Cashier and Accountant of the South Australian Company)
- Thomas Bewes Strangways

All members of the committee (except Stephens) had one or more of the streets and squares in the Adelaide city centre and North Adelaide named after themselves. Brown Street, named for John Brown, was subsequently subsumed as a continuation of Morphett Street in 1967. In the same year, Hanson Street, named for Richard Hanson, was subsumed as a continuation of Pulteney Street.

The squares were named after:

- Victoria – the regent, Princess Victoria, later Queen Victoria
- Hindmarsh – Rear Admiral Sir John Hindmarsh, first Governor of South Australia
- Hurtle – Sir James Hurtle Fisher, first Resident Commissioner
- Light – Colonel William Light, Surveyor General
- Whitmore – William Wolryche-Whitmore MP, a Colonial Commissioner in London

The east–west streets named on 22 December 1836 were:

- Rundle – John Rundle MP, Director of the South Australian Company
- Hindley – Charles Hindley MP, Director of South Australian Company
- Grenfell – Pascoe St Leger Grenfell, businessman and patron, presented a town acre for the Holy Trinity Church and other country lands
- Currie – Raikes Currie MP, Director of South Australian Company
- Pirie – Sir John Pirie, alderman and later Lord Mayor of London, Director of South Australian Company
- Waymouth – Henry Waymouth, Director South Australian Company
- Flinders – Matthew Flinders, explorer
- Franklin – Rear Admiral Sir John Franklin, midshipman under Flinders
- Wakefield – Daniel Bell Wakefield, barrister who drafted the South Australia Act
- Grote – George Grote MP, treasurer of the South Australia Association
- Angas – George Fife Angas, a Colonial Commissioner and founding Chairman of Directors of the South Australian Company
- Gouger – Robert Gouger, first Colonial Secretary

Most of these people did not reside in or visit South Australia.

The naming of the streets was completed on 23 May 1837 and gazetted on 3 June.

East–west streets:

- Carrington – John Abel Smith (Lord Carrington)
- Wright – John Wright, Colonial Commissioner and financier
- Halifax – Charles Wood, 1st Viscount Halifax, Chancellor of the Exchequer
- Sturt – Charles Sturt, explorer
- Gilles – Osmond Gilles, early treasurer of the colony
- Gilbert – Thomas Gilbert, storekeeper and postmaster

North–south streets:

- Morphett – John Morphett, member of the South Australian parliament
- Pulteney – Admiral Sir Pulteney Malcolm, British naval officer
- Hutt – William Hutt MP, a Colonial Commissioner

=== Dual naming of squares and parklands ===
The Adelaide City Council began the process of dual naming all of the city squares, each of the parks making up the parklands which surround the city centre and North Adelaide, and other sites of significance to the Kaurna people in 1997. The naming process, which assigned an extra name in the Kaurna language to each place, was mostly completed in 2003, and the renaming of 39 sites finalised and endorsed by the council in 2012.

- Victoria Square – Tarntanyangga ('red kangaroo dreaming')
- Hindmarsh Square – Mukata
- Hurtle Square – Tangkaira
- Light Square – Wauwi
- Whitmore Square – Iparrityi

=== 20th–21st century precincts ===
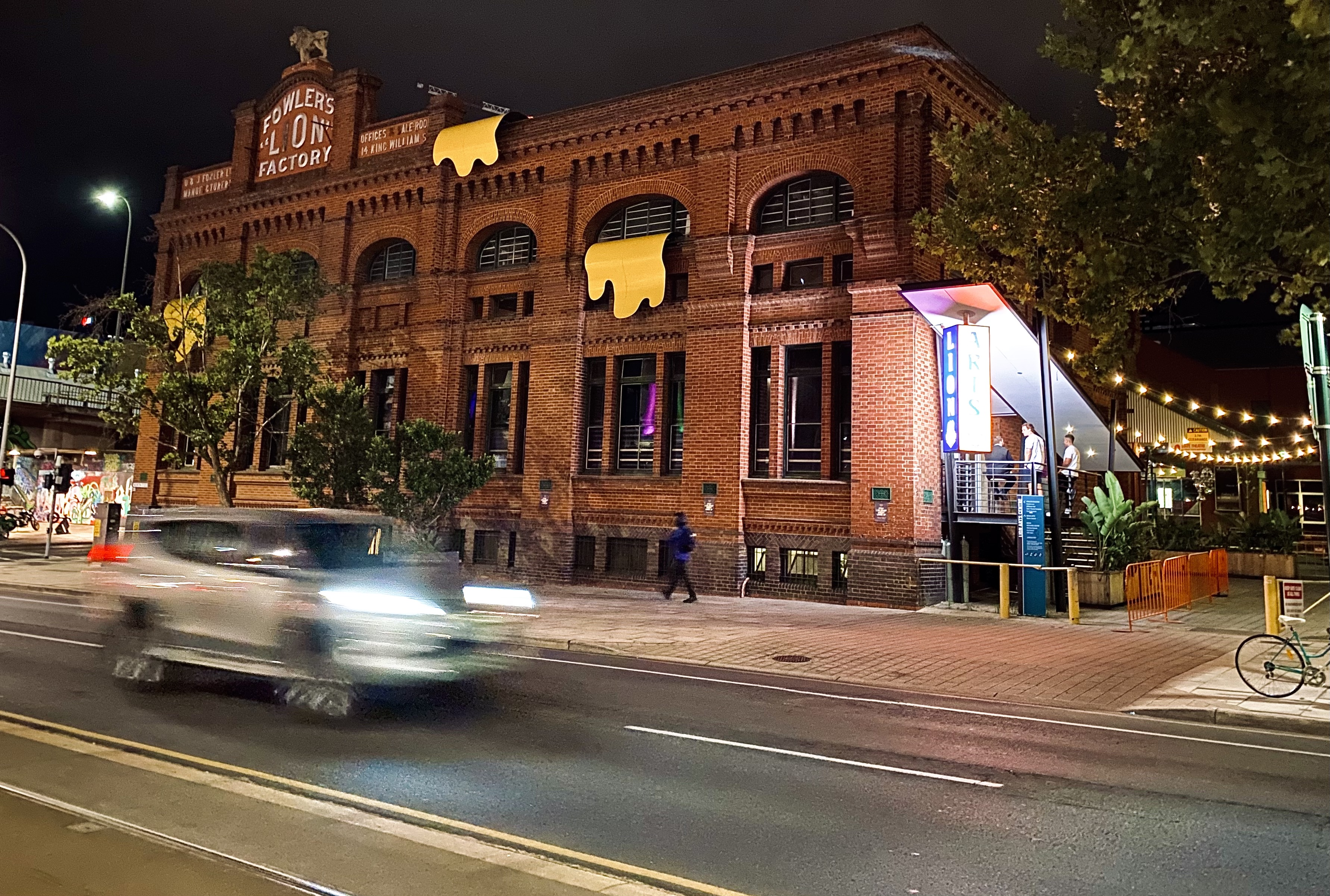
The Lion Arts Centre, an iconic live music and performance venue in Adelaide's West End.

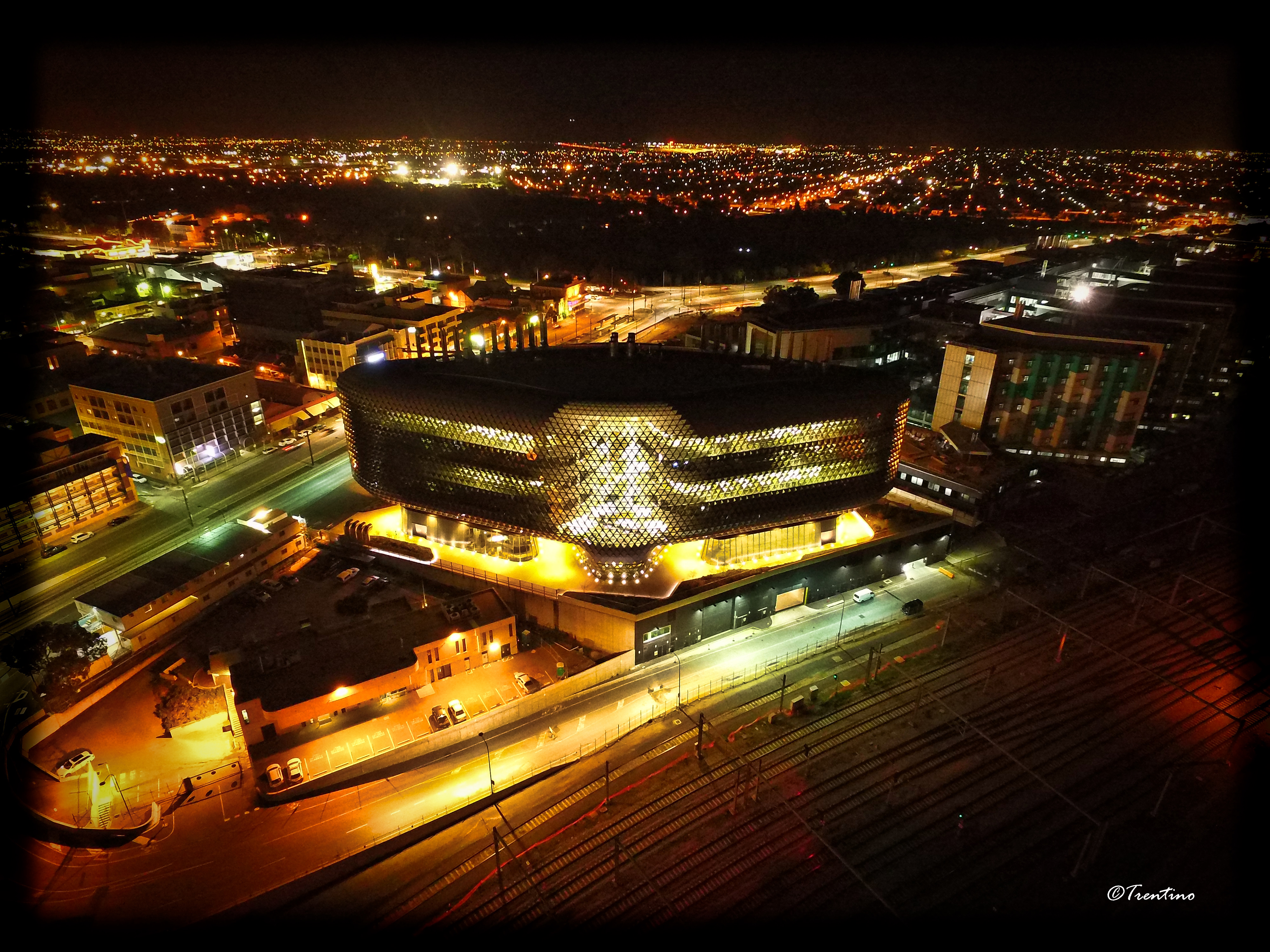
The South Australian Health and Medical Research Institute, part of the BioMed City precinct at the West End of North Terrace

The City of Adelaide Council has defined a number of neighbourhood precincts in the city centre, each with a character of their own:

- The East End, centering on Rundle Street known for its restaurants, bars, high-end fashion shops, the Palace Nova Cinema;
- The West End, from the western end of North Terrace and encompassing several blocks southward, which includes the University of South Australia 'CityWest' campus, the Samstag Museum of Art, JamFactory, Lion Arts Centre, Mercury Cinema, numerous bars, clubs and restaurants, and "BioMed City";
- The South East of the city, largely residential, but including many cafés, restaurants, pubs, etc.; and
- The South West is very diverse; largely residential and including the Adelaide Central Market

In addition to these, the north-eastern side of North Terrace is often referred to as the "North Terrace cultural precinct" or "cultural boulevard", and includes the Art Gallery of South Australia, the State Library of South Australia, the South Australian Museum, the Migration Museum, the Adelaide Botanic Garden, the University of Adelaide and the "CityEast" campus of the UniSA

== Demographics ==
The population was 18,202 in the 2021 census, 41 percent born in Australia. The next most common countries of birth were China 15.7%, India 3.7%, England 3.6%, Malaysia 3.6%, and Hong Kong 2.7%. 49.1% of people spoke only English at home. Other languages spoken at home included Mandarin 17.8%, Cantonese 4.2%, Vietnamese 2%, Hindi 1.5%, and Korean 1.5%. The most common response for religion in Adelaide was "no religion" at 52.9% of the population.

== Politics ==
At federal level, Adelaide is within the Division of Adelaide, a marginal seat which historically has alternated between the Liberal and Labor parties. It has been held since 2019 by Steve Georganas of the Labor party.

In the South Australian House of Assembly, Adelaide is within the Electoral district of Adelaide. Since the March 2022 state election, the seat has been held by Lucy Hood of the Labor party.

== Culture ==
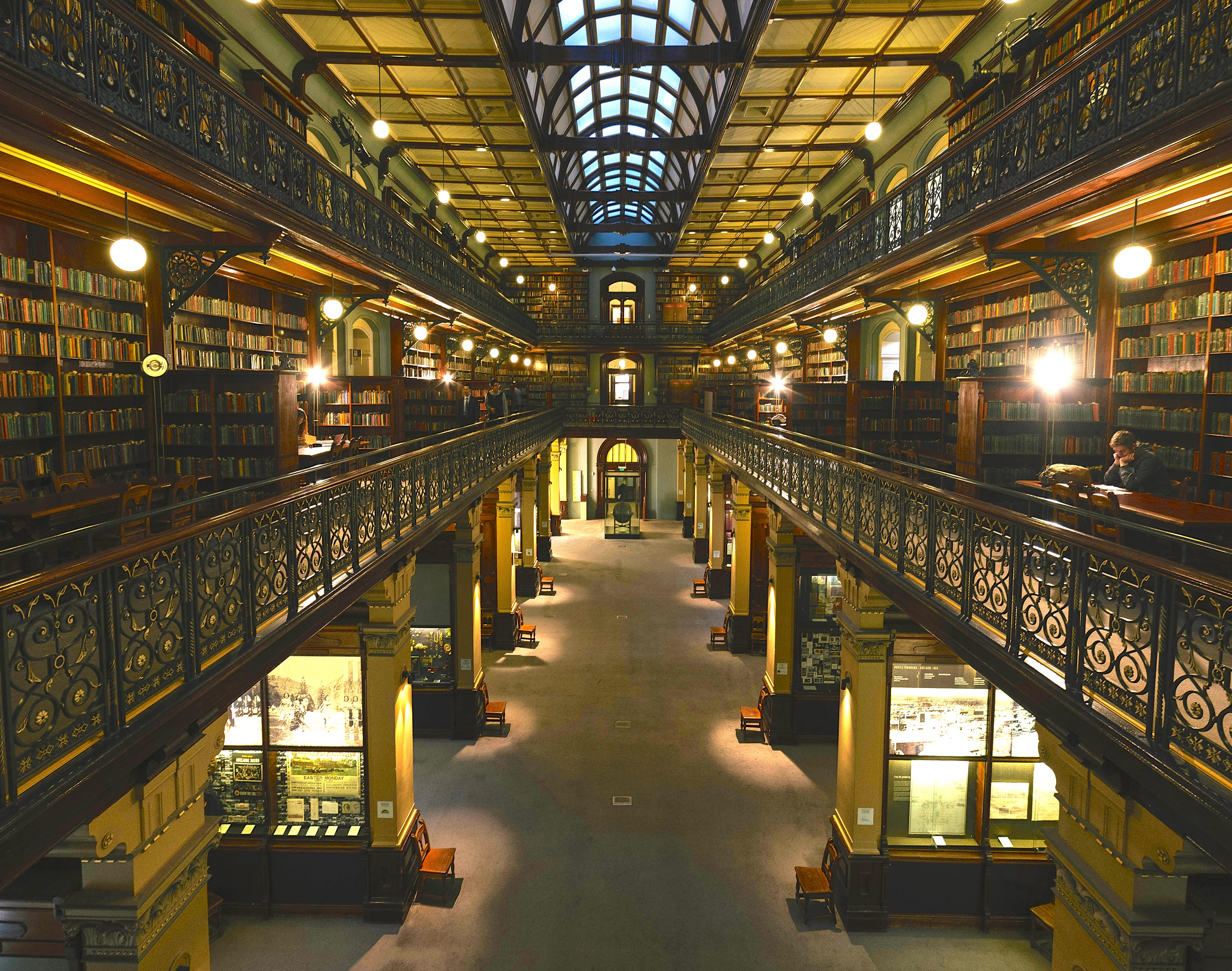
The interior of the Mortlock Chamber at the State Library of South Australia

Adelaide's cultural and entertainment precincts/venues are generally concentrated in the city centre, including the Convention Centre; the Adelaide Oval is just north of the Torrens within the parklands and easily accessible from the city. Most of the events relating to the Adelaide Festival and Adelaide Fringe are held within Adelaide's city centre and surrounding parklands during February and March. This time is known as "Mad March", due to the large number of other cultural festivities at the same time, including the Adelaide 500 and WOMADelaide.

North Terrace is considered Adelaide's "cultural boulevard" because it is home to the State Library of South Australia, the South Australian Museum, the Migration Museum, the Art Gallery of South Australia, the University of Adelaide, the city campus of University of South Australia, and several smaller galleries.

Lonely Planet labelled Adelaide "Australia's live music city", and the city was recognised as a "City of Music" by the UNESCO Creative Cities Network in 2015. Although there were many pubs hosting live music in the CBD in past, the number has slowly diminished. Two remain very popular with musicians and patrons alike:

- The Grace Emily on Waymouth Street, which was refurbished as a live music venue around 1998 and renamed after an elderly neighbour, was added to the South Australian Music Hall of Fame in 2017.
- The Crown & Anchor was saved from demolition in 2024 after a vigorous campaign by the public as well as many musicians and politicians. New legislation passed on 11 September 2024 designates the entire Adelaide CBD as a "live music venue area", and gives protection to selected live music venues.

== Gallery ==
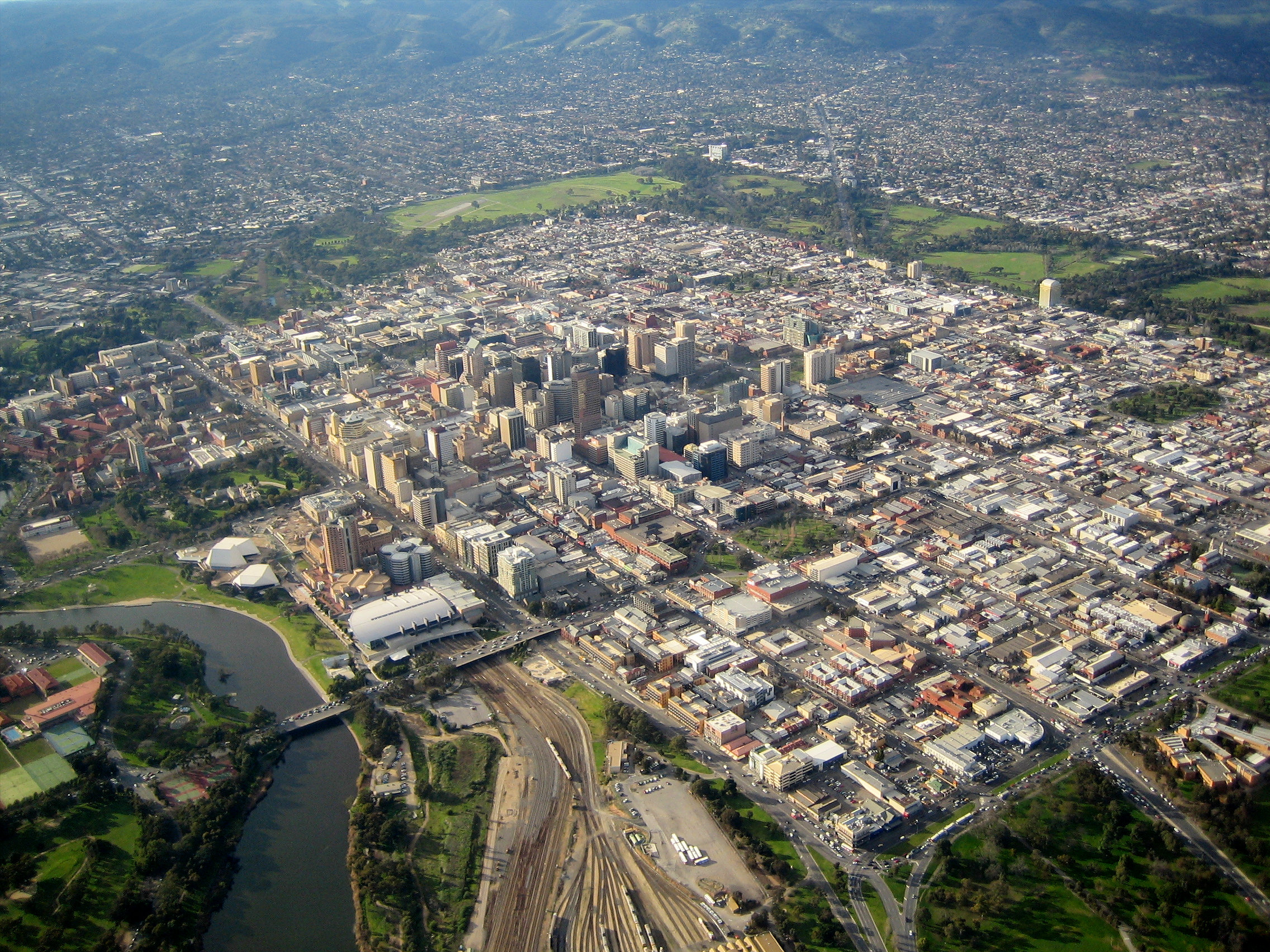
Aerial view of the Adelaide city centre looking south-east, 2005.

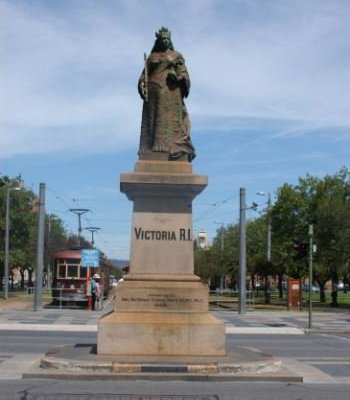
A statue of Queen Victoria has stood in the geometric centre of both Victoria Square and "the square mile" since 1894.

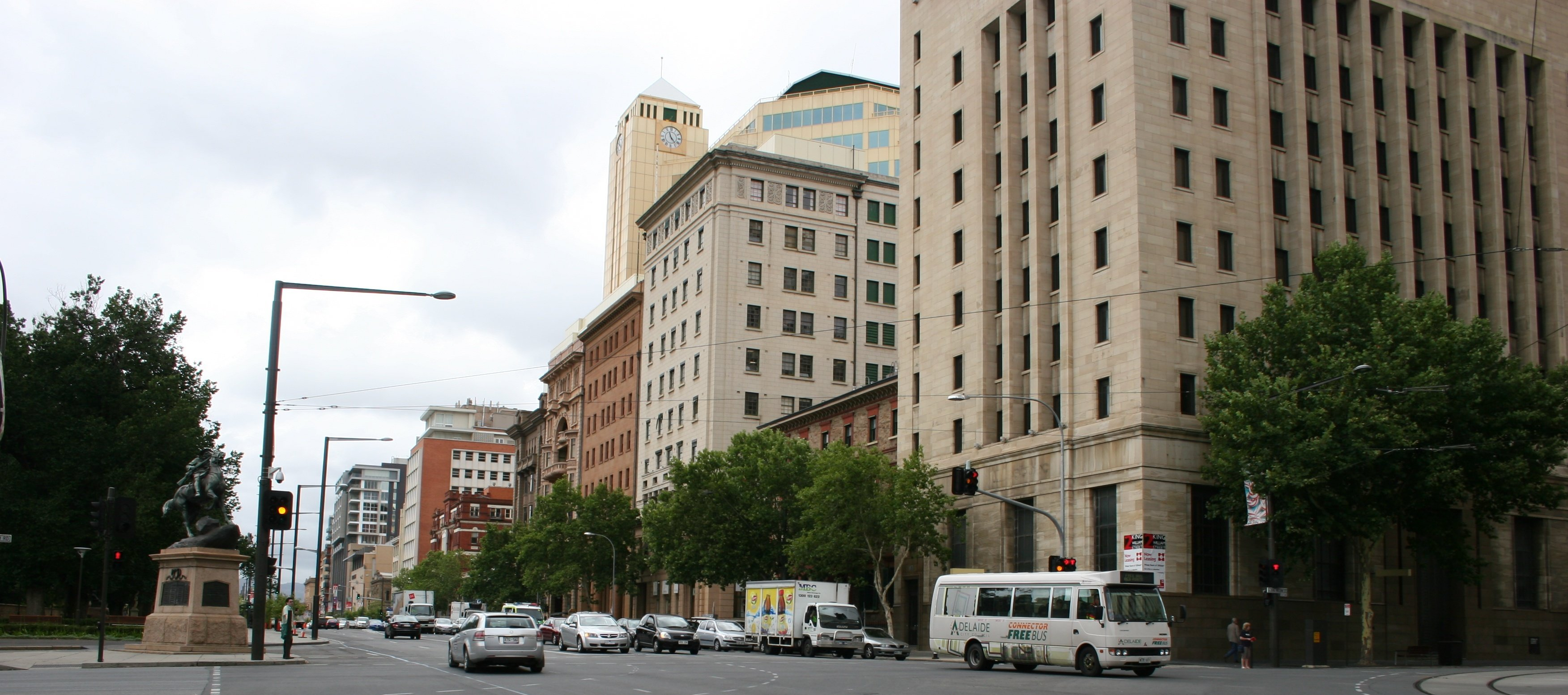
Part of North Terrace, 2009.

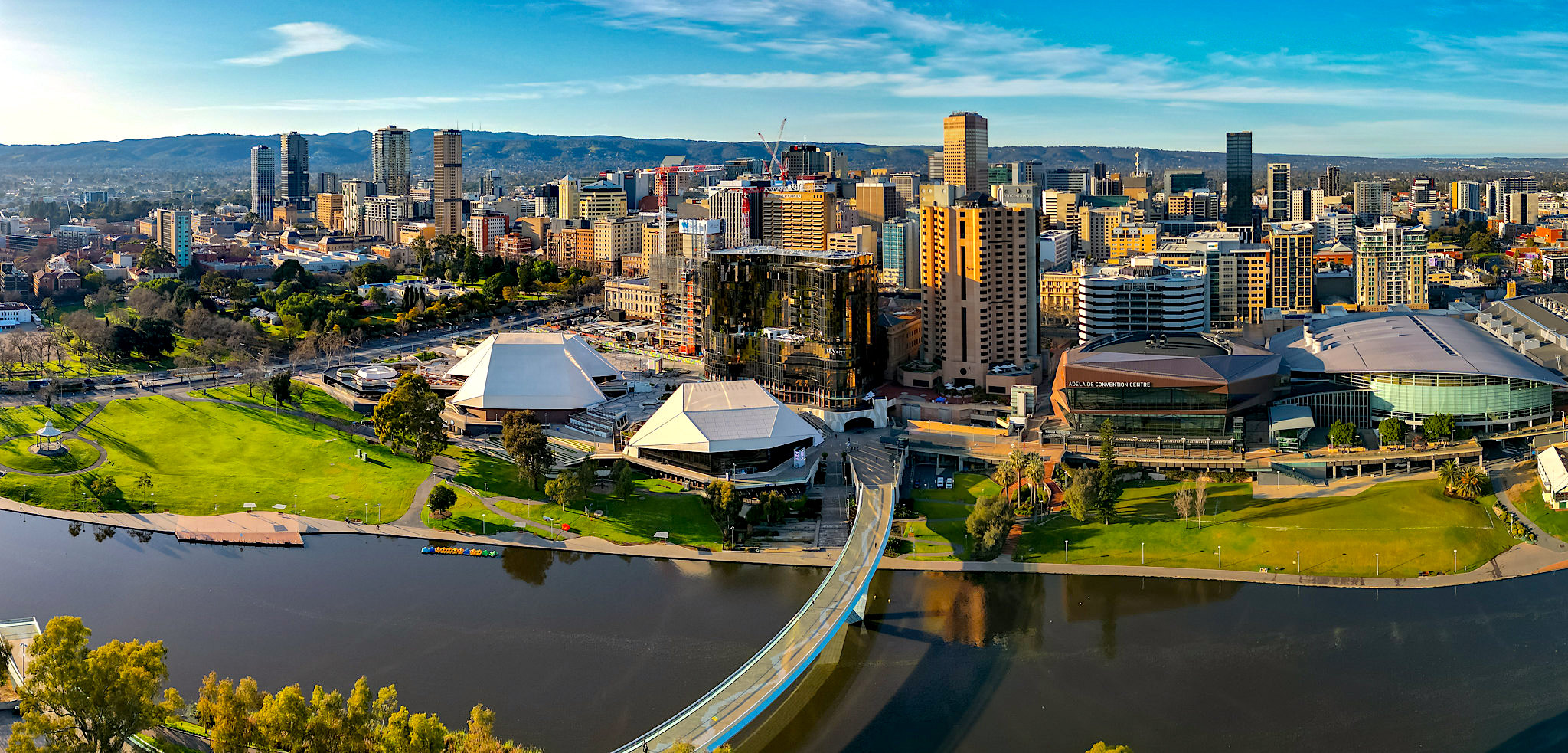
Adelaide CBD from above, 2022.

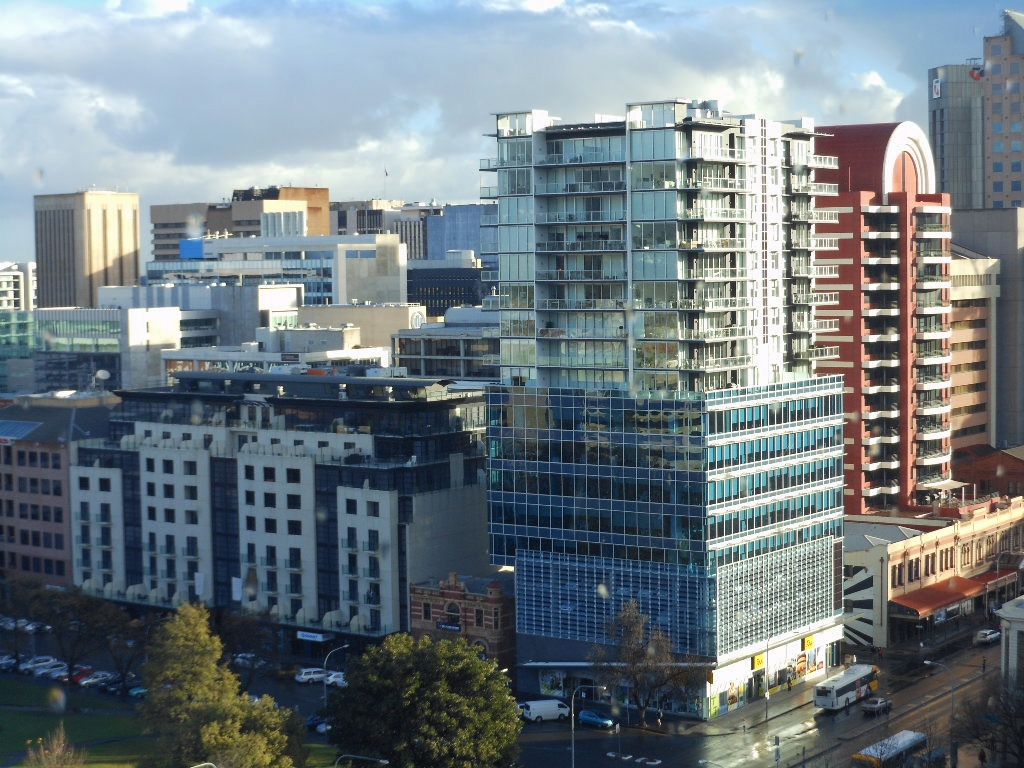
High rise buildings on Hindmarsh Square, 2012.

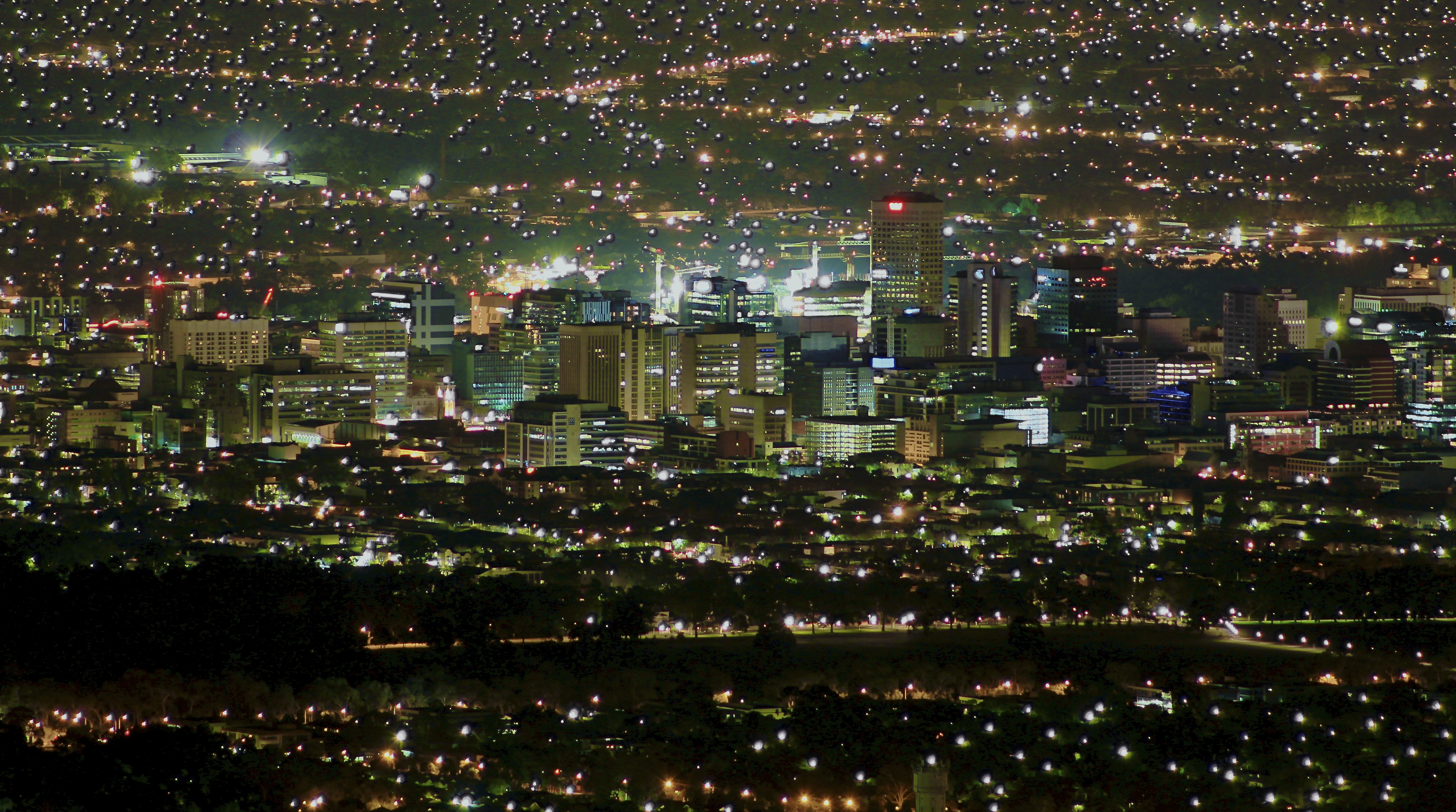
Night aerial of the CBD, 2014

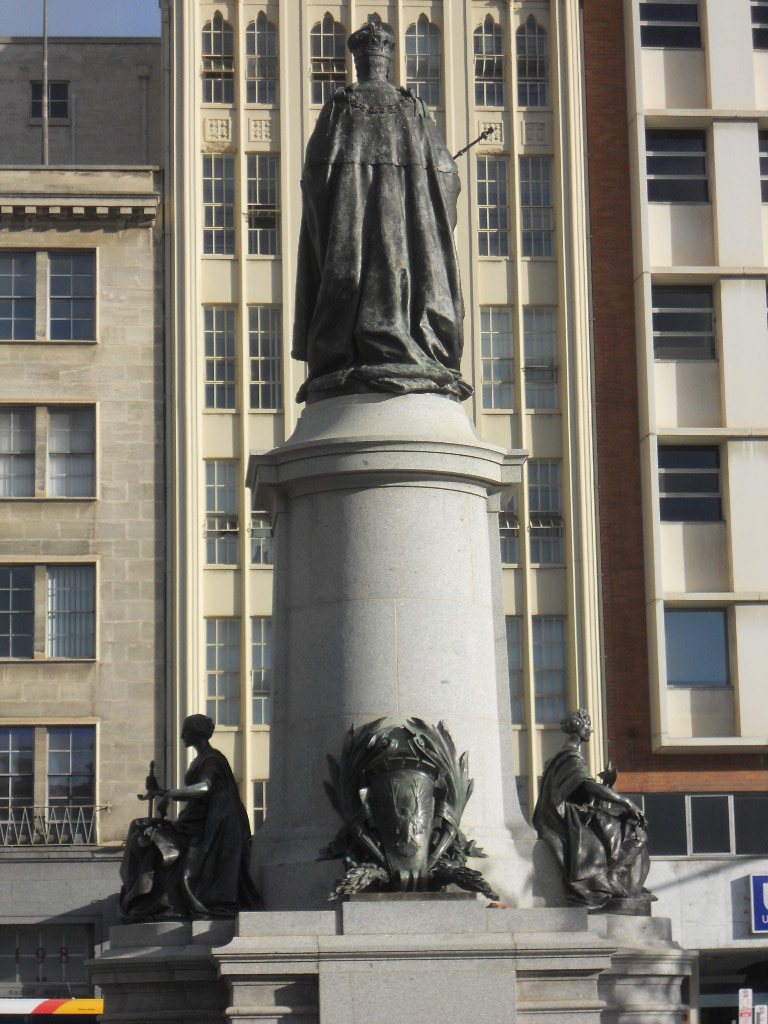
Statue of King Edward VII on North Terrace.

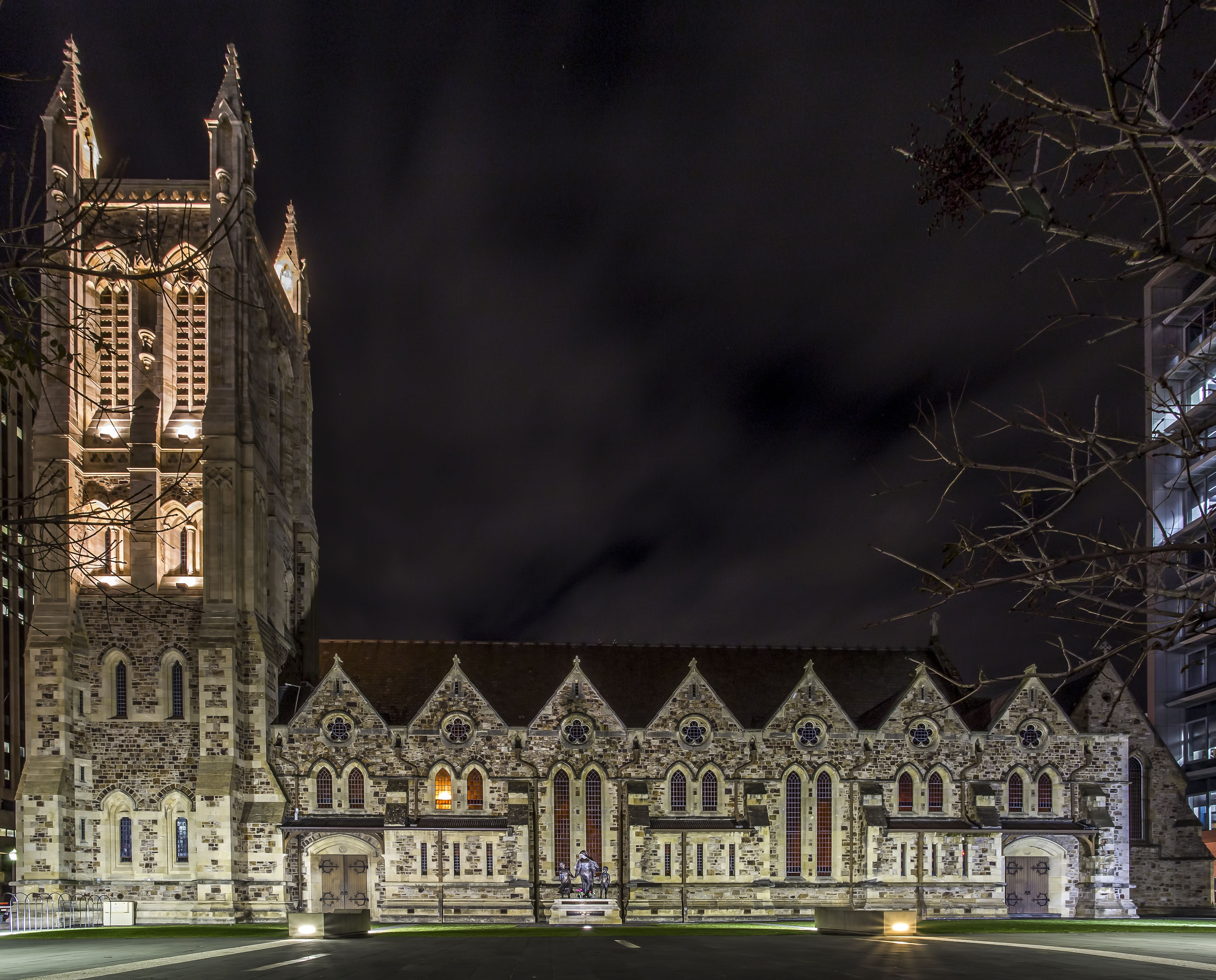
St Francis Xavier's Cathedral, Victoria Square.

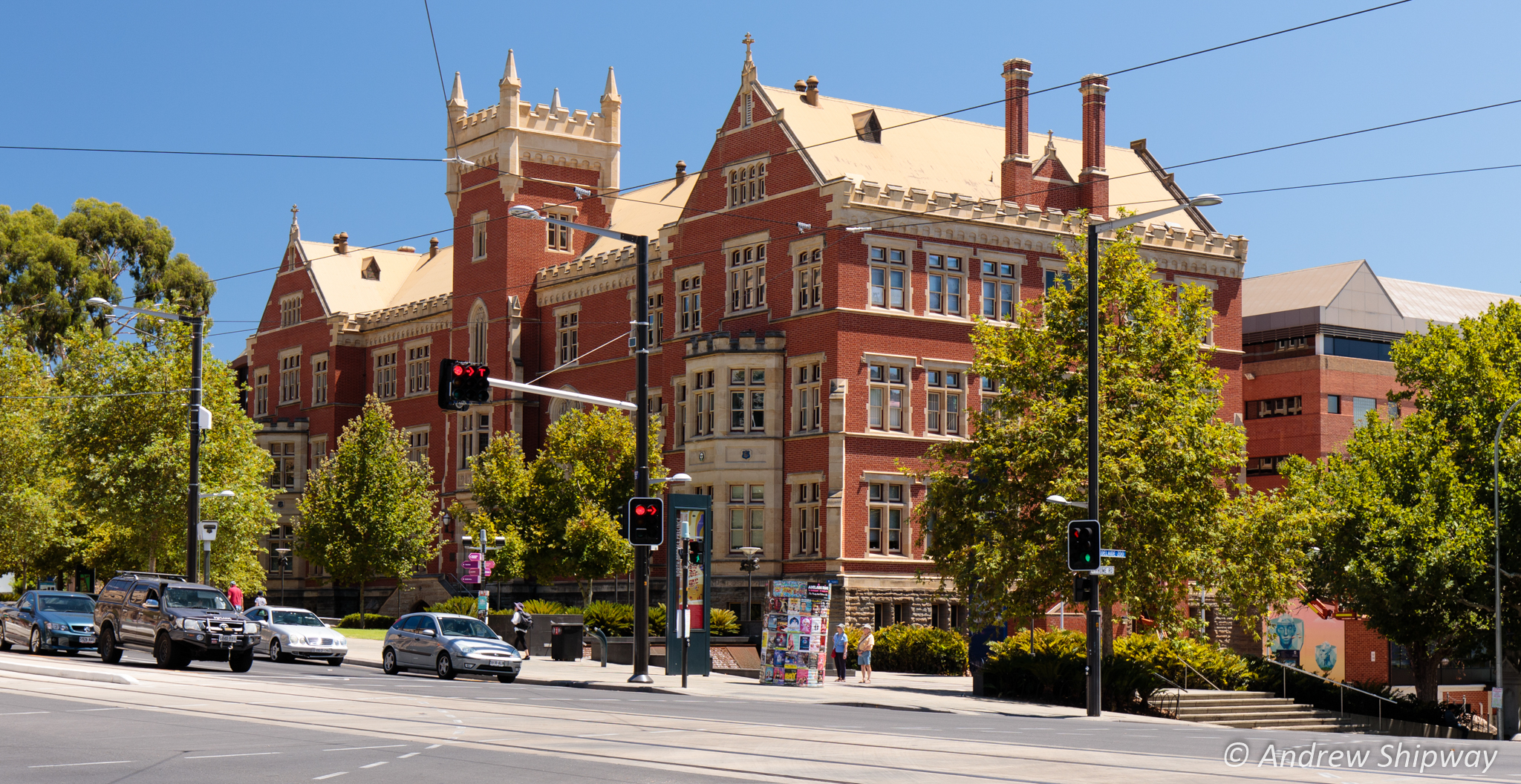
Brookman Building on North Terrace, part of the City East campus of Adelaide University

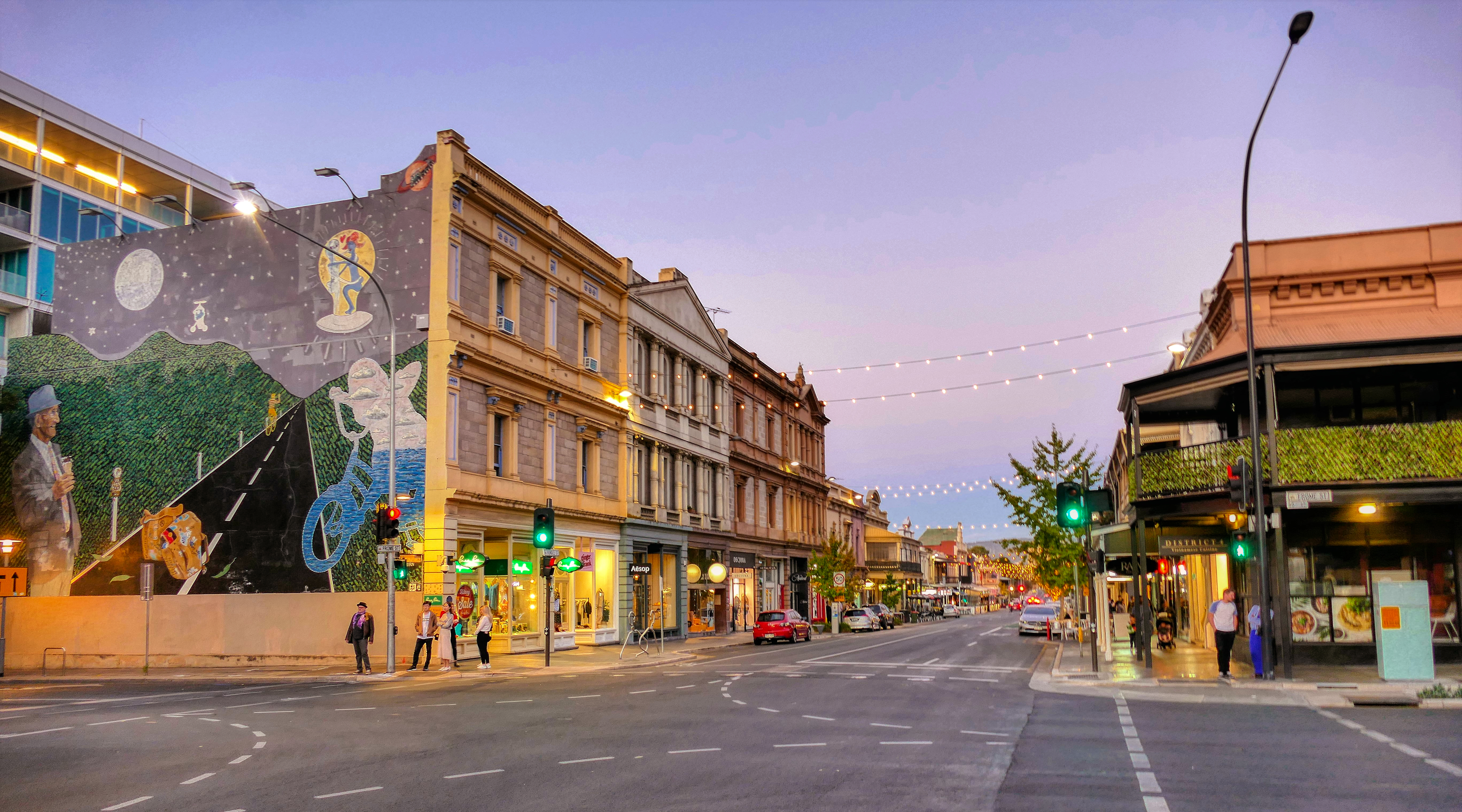
Rundle Street looking east
Pictures of Adelaide city centre skyline

From the north

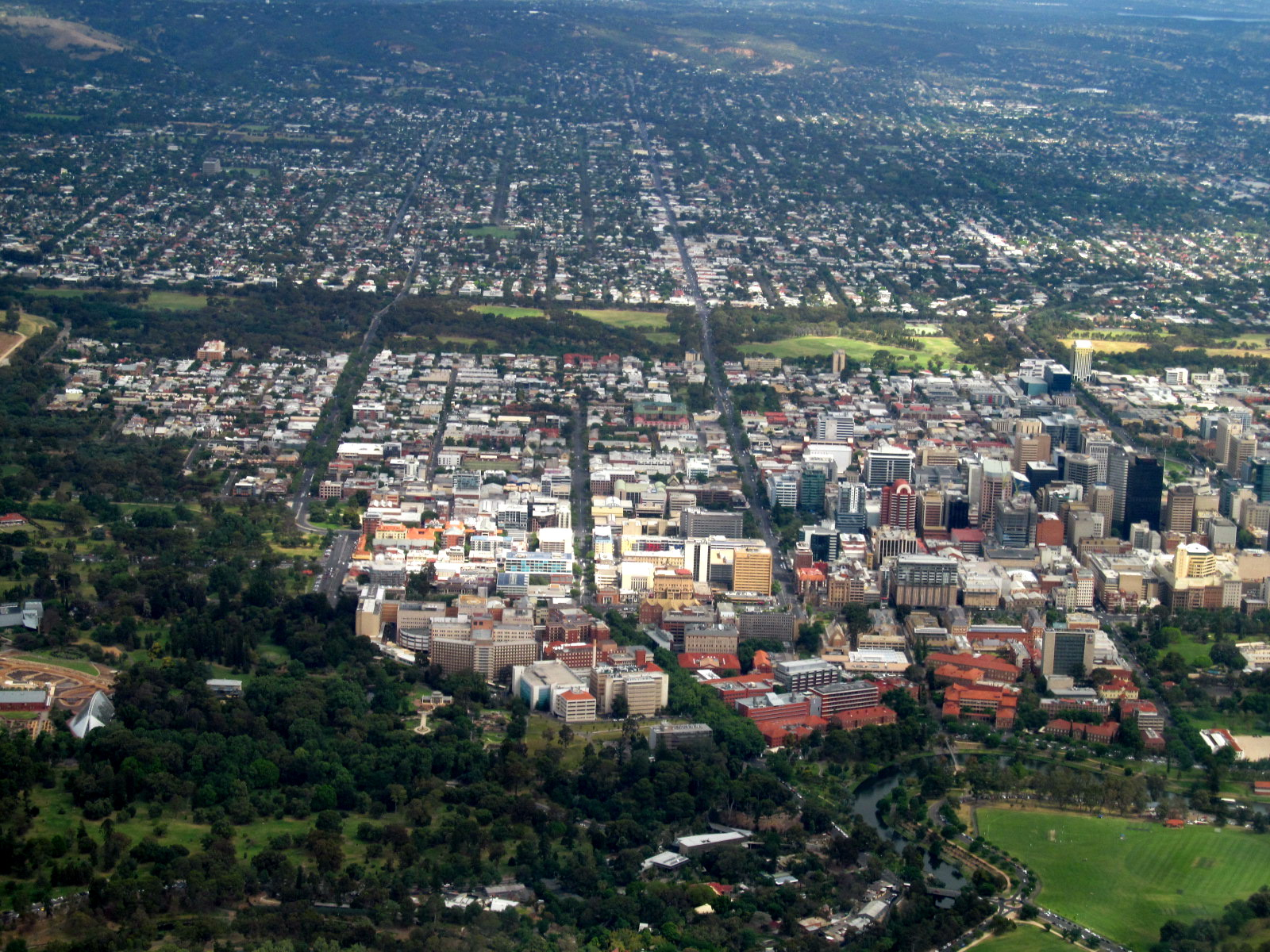
East Terrace to King William Street, 2012

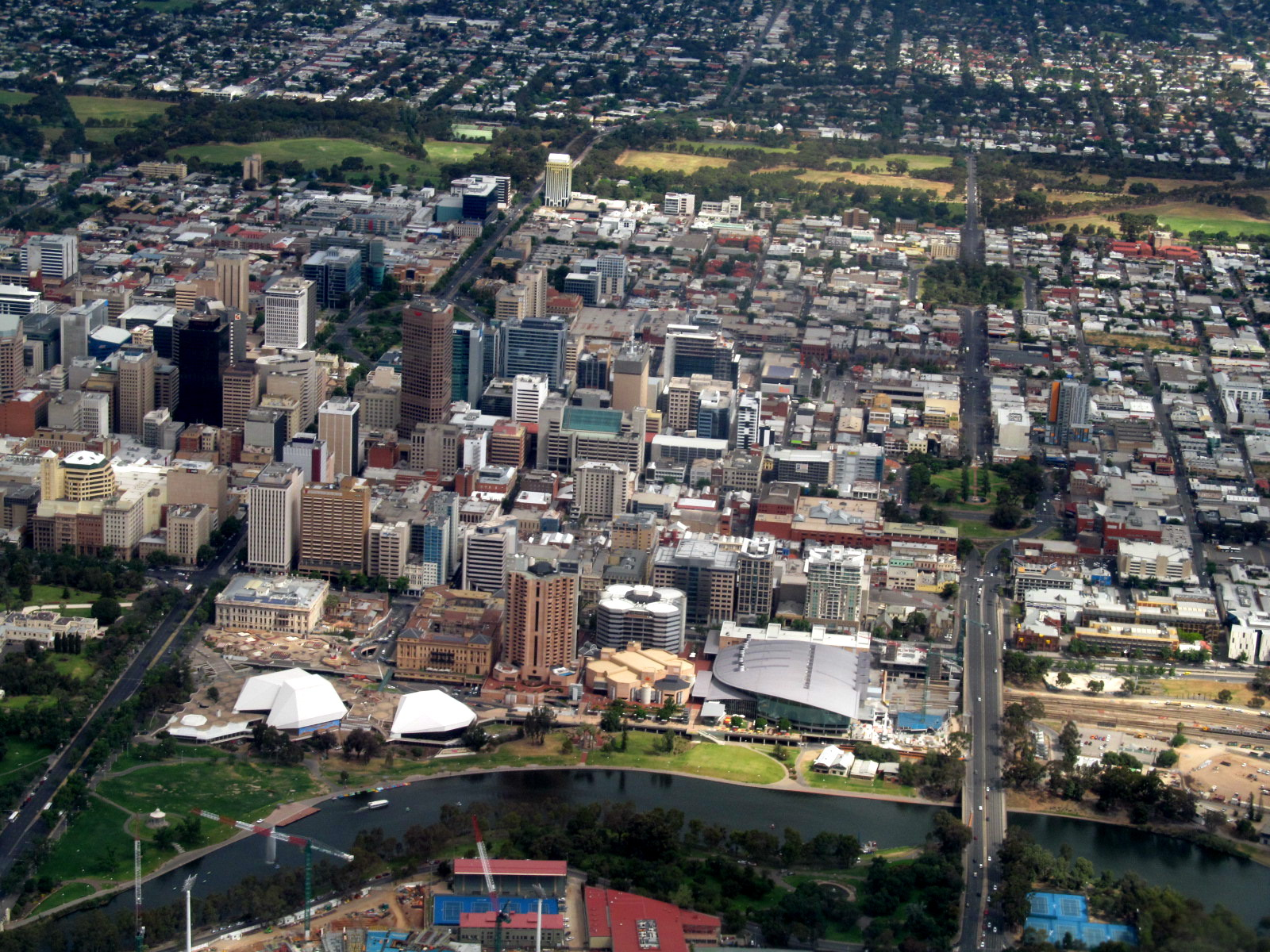
King William Street to Morphett Street, 2012

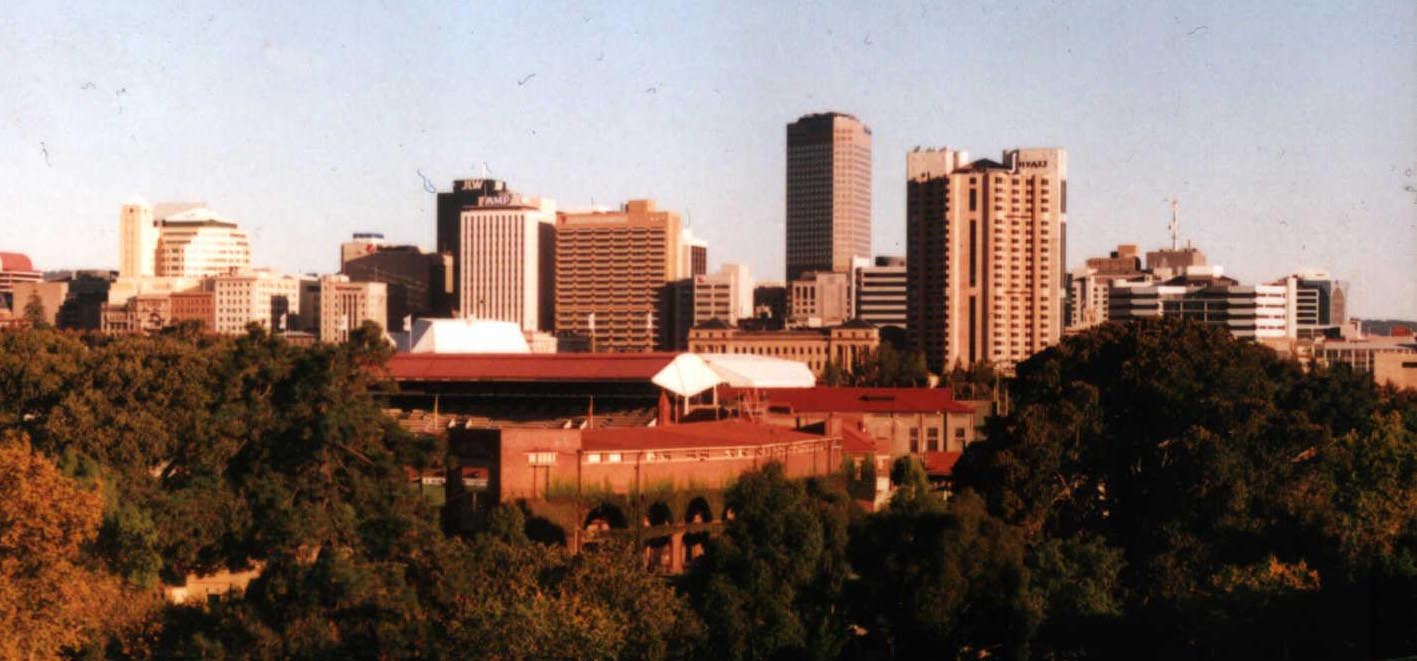
From Light's Vision, 1997

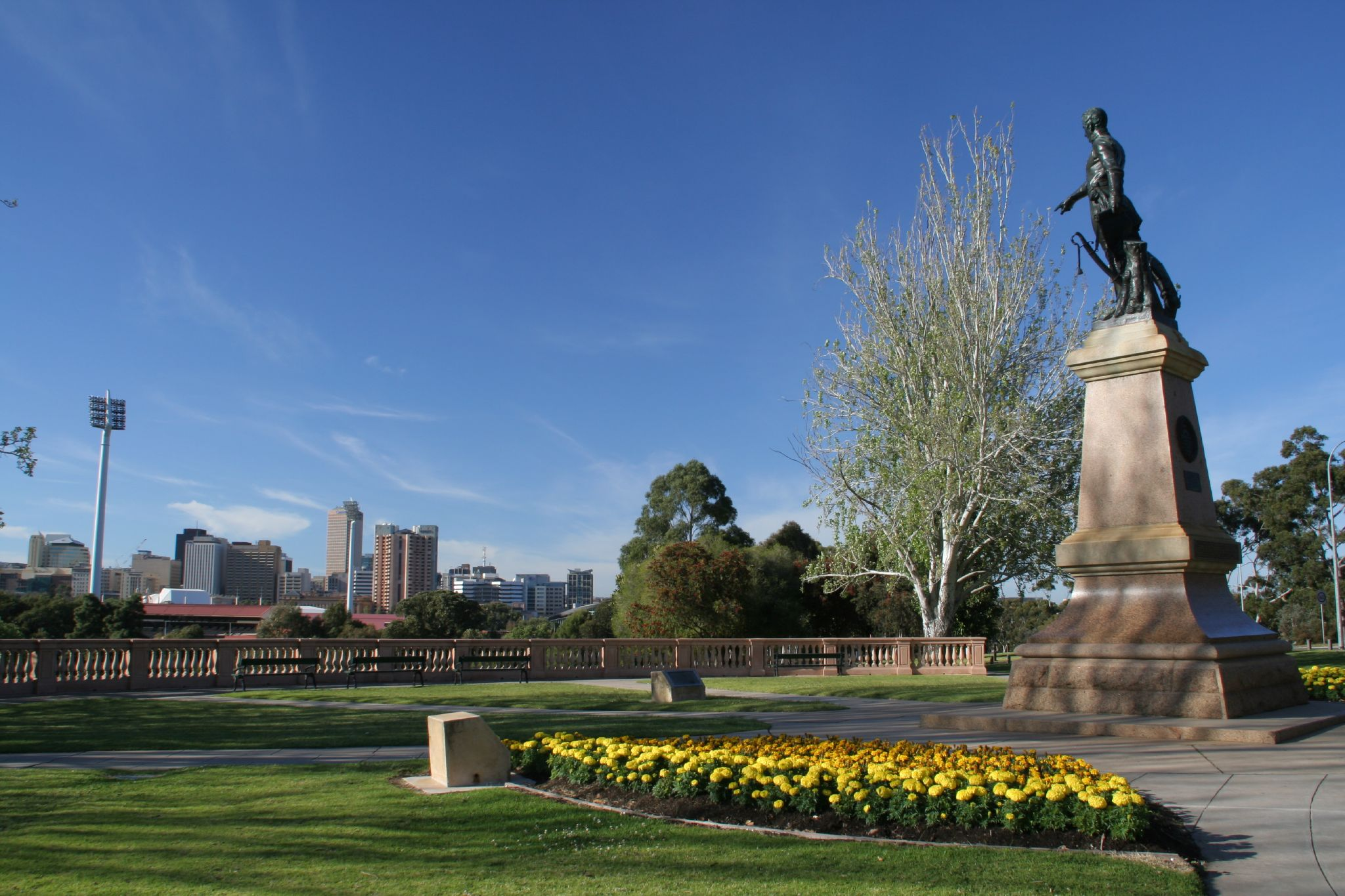
Light's Vision, 2006

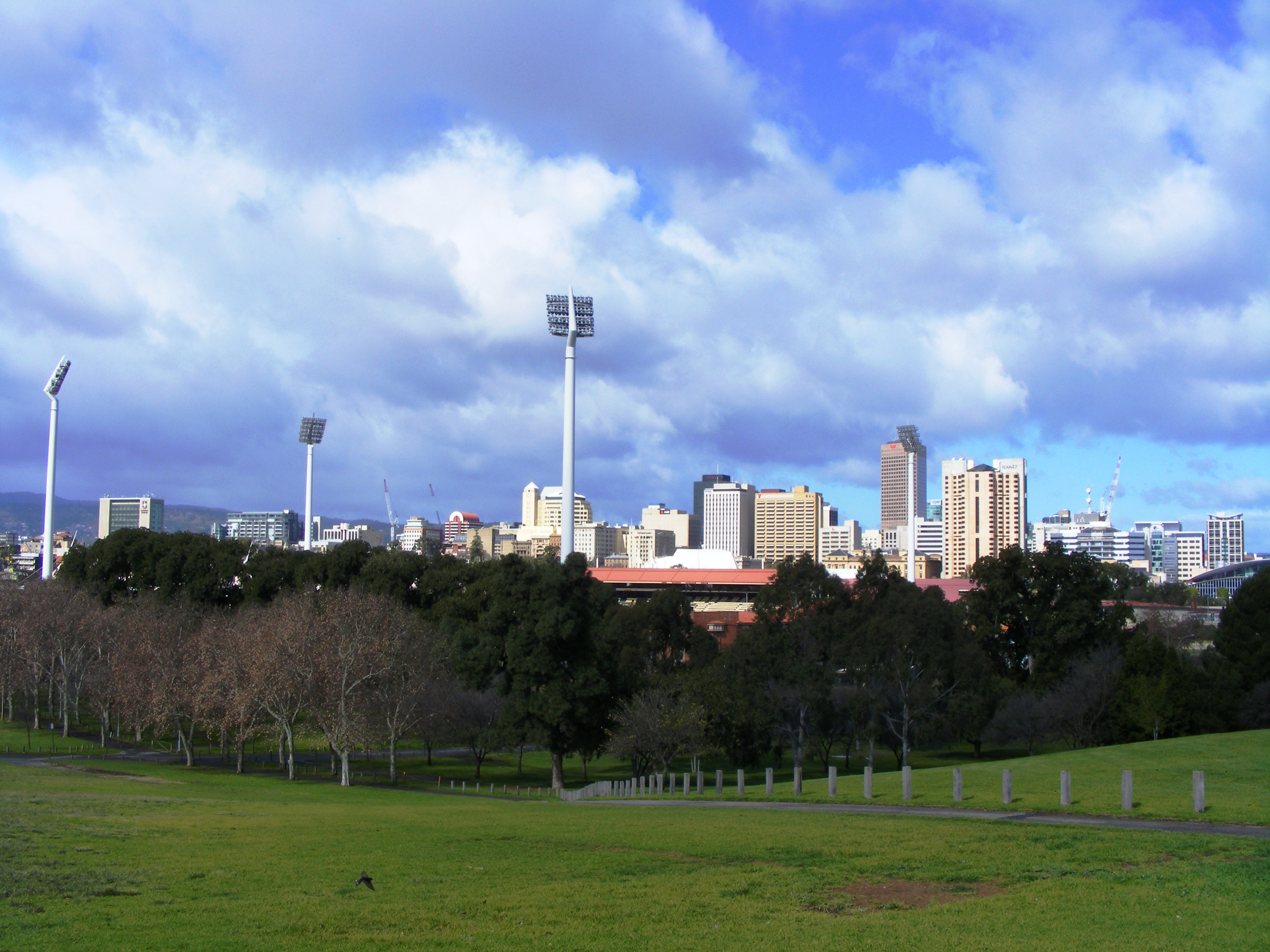
From Light's Vision, 2008

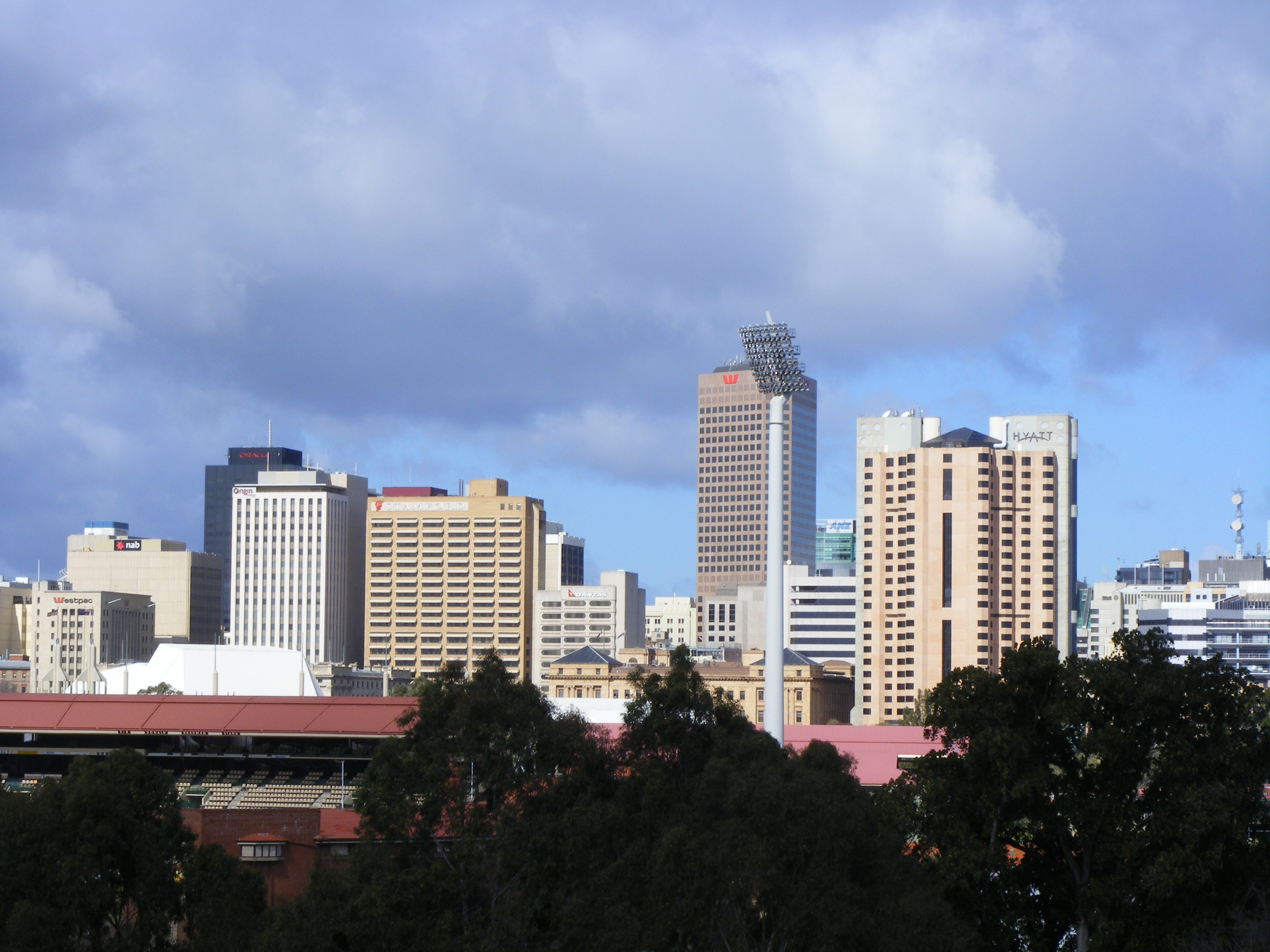
From Light's Vision, 2008

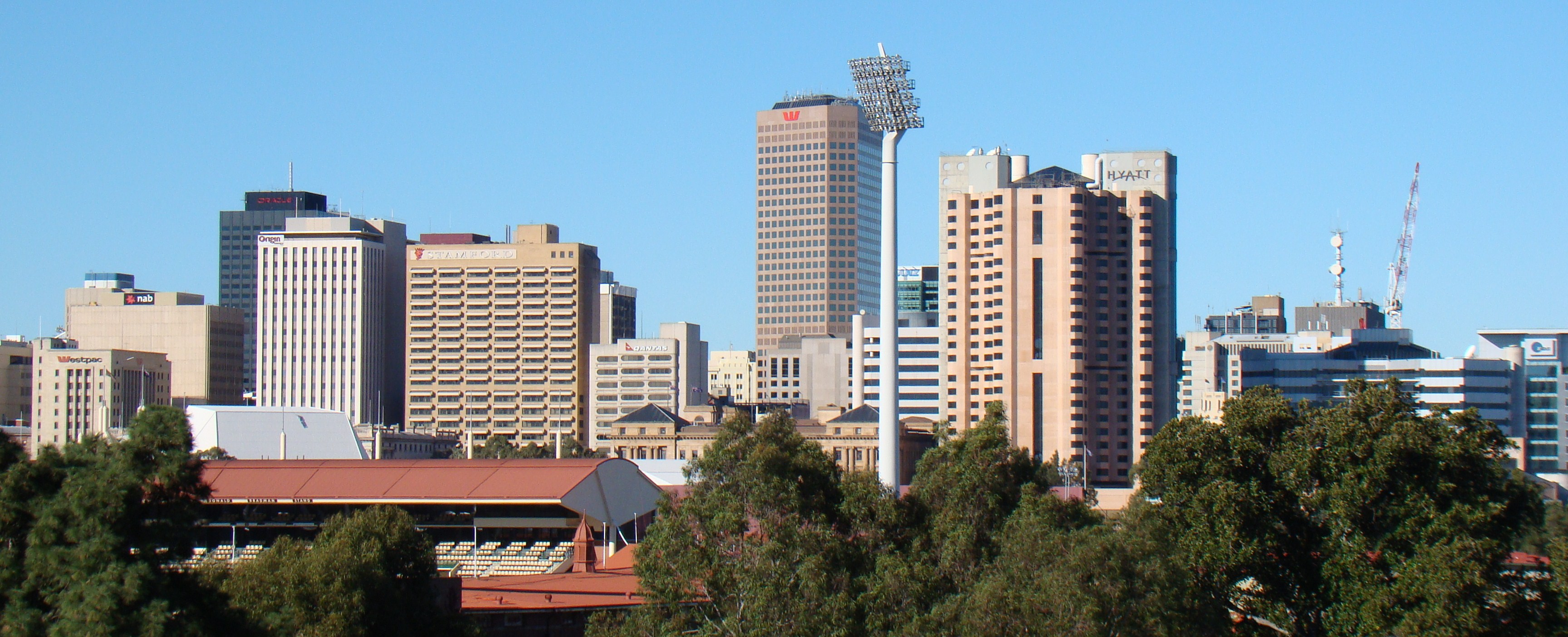
From Light's Vision, 2008

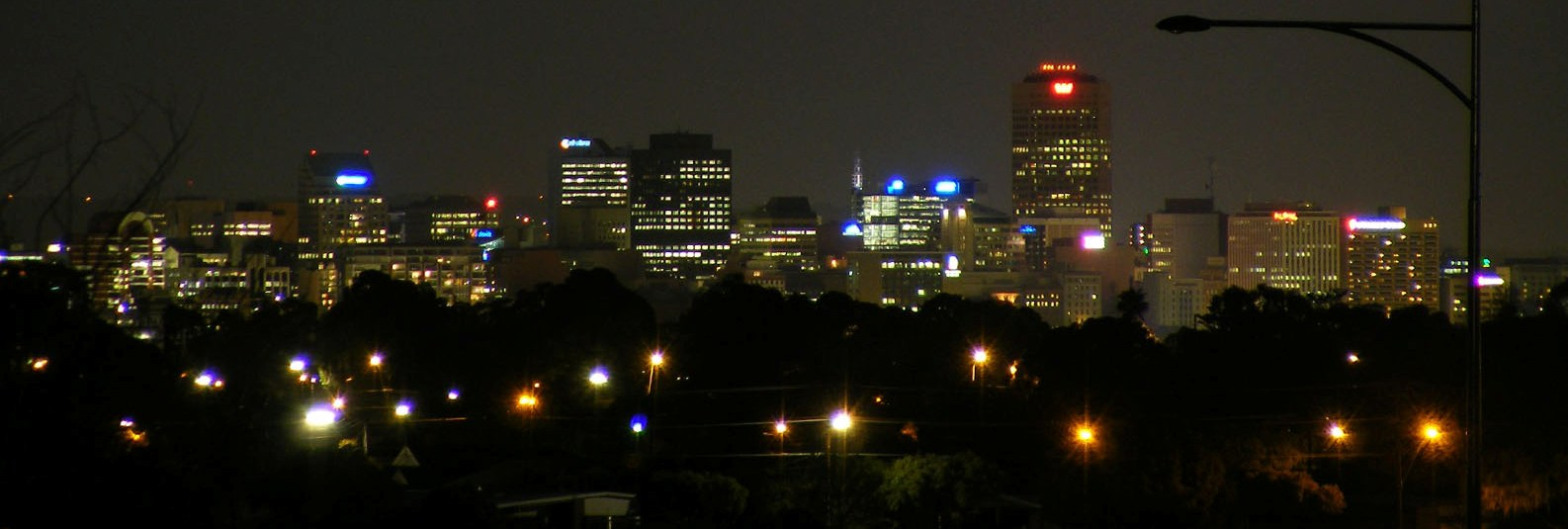
From Lightsview, 2008

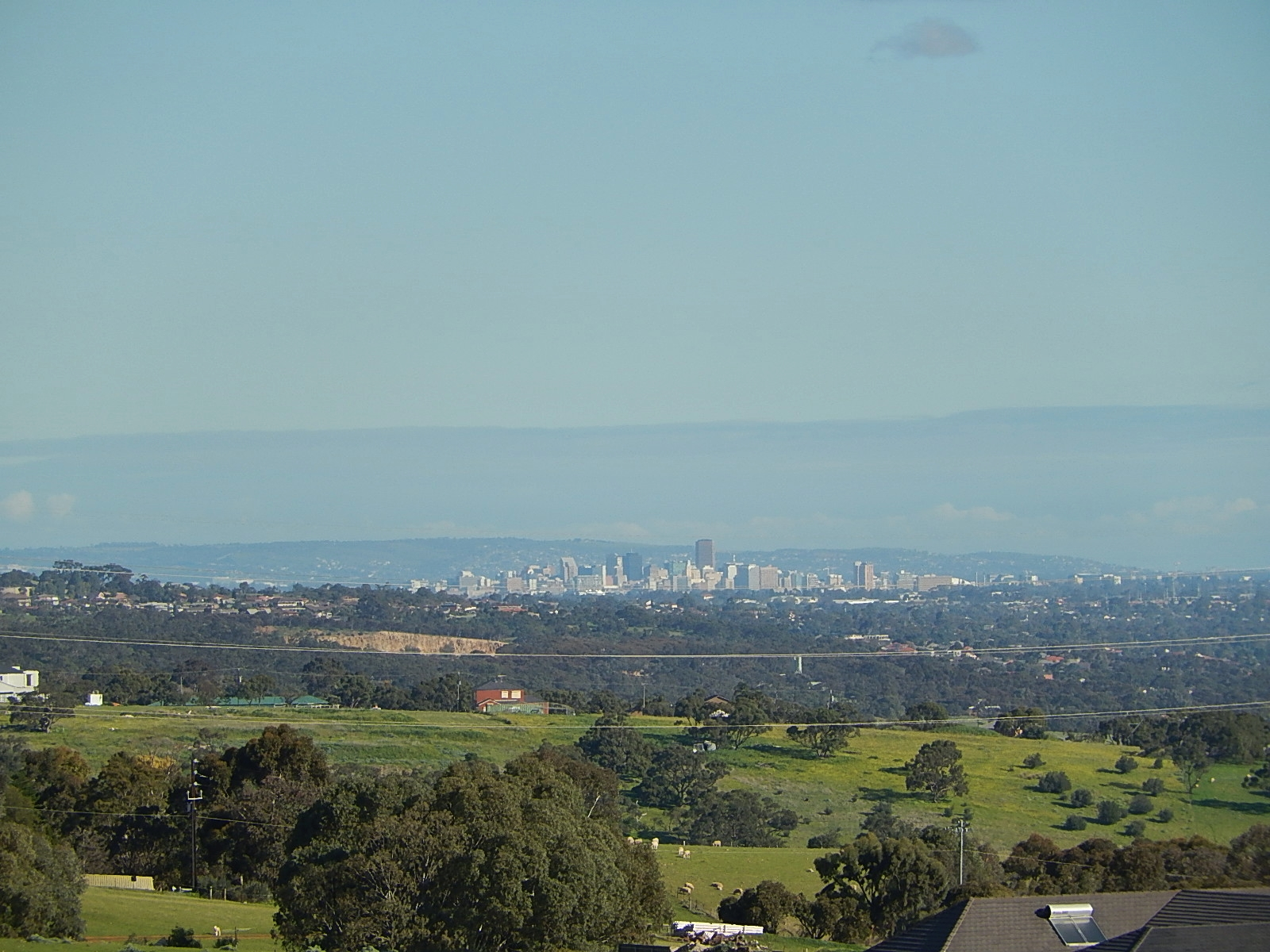
From north, 2014

From the east

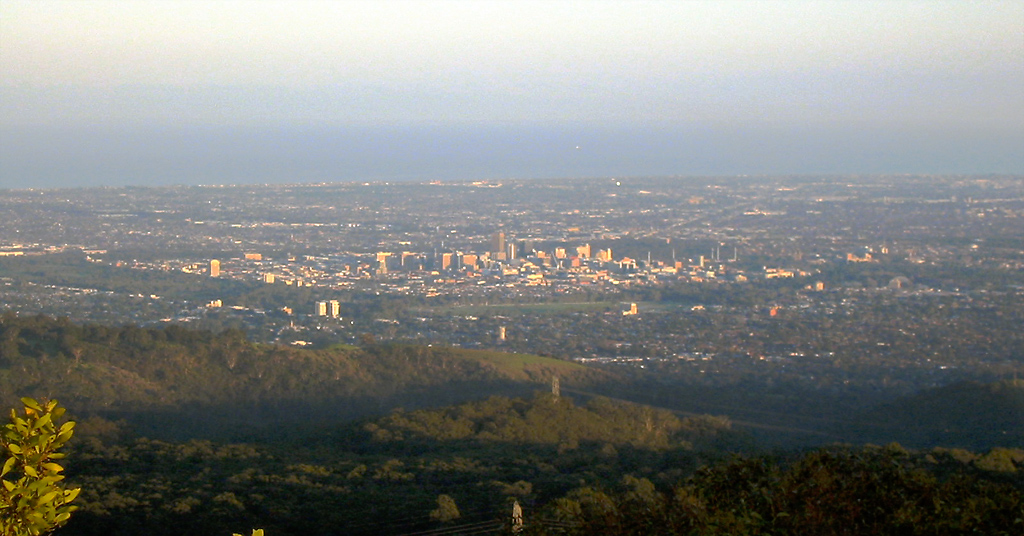
From Mount Lofty, 2005

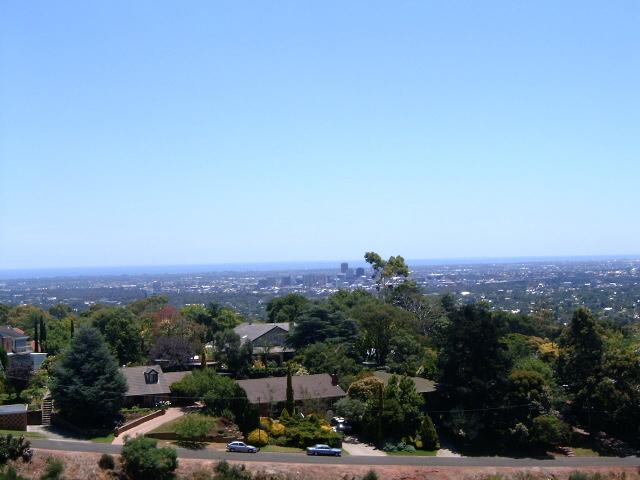
From Waterfall Gully, 2005

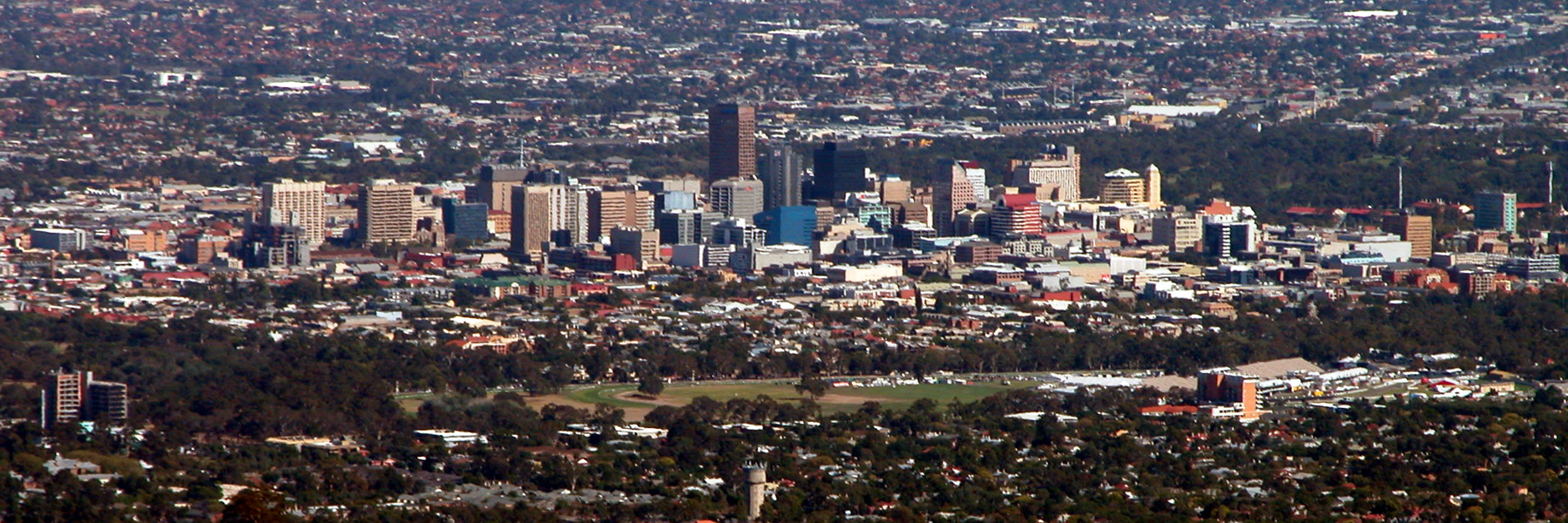
From Mount Lofty, 2007

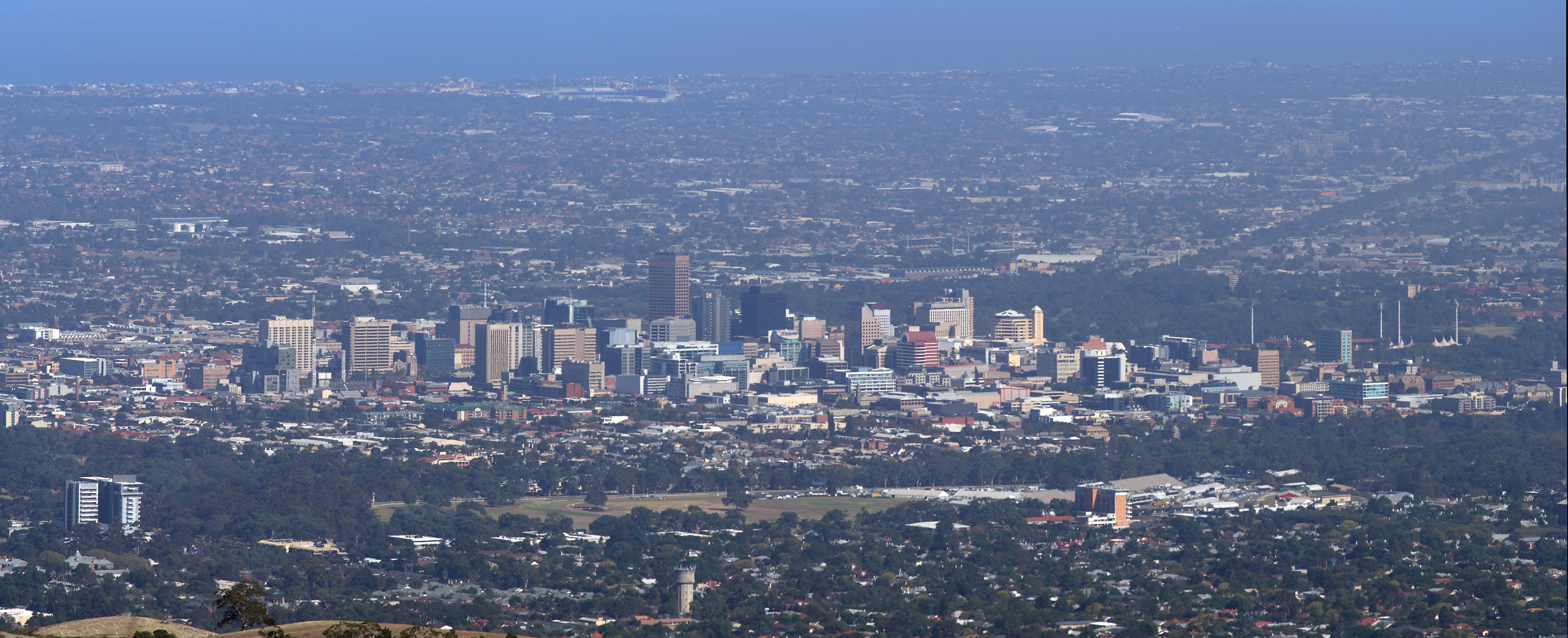
From Mount Lofty, 2007

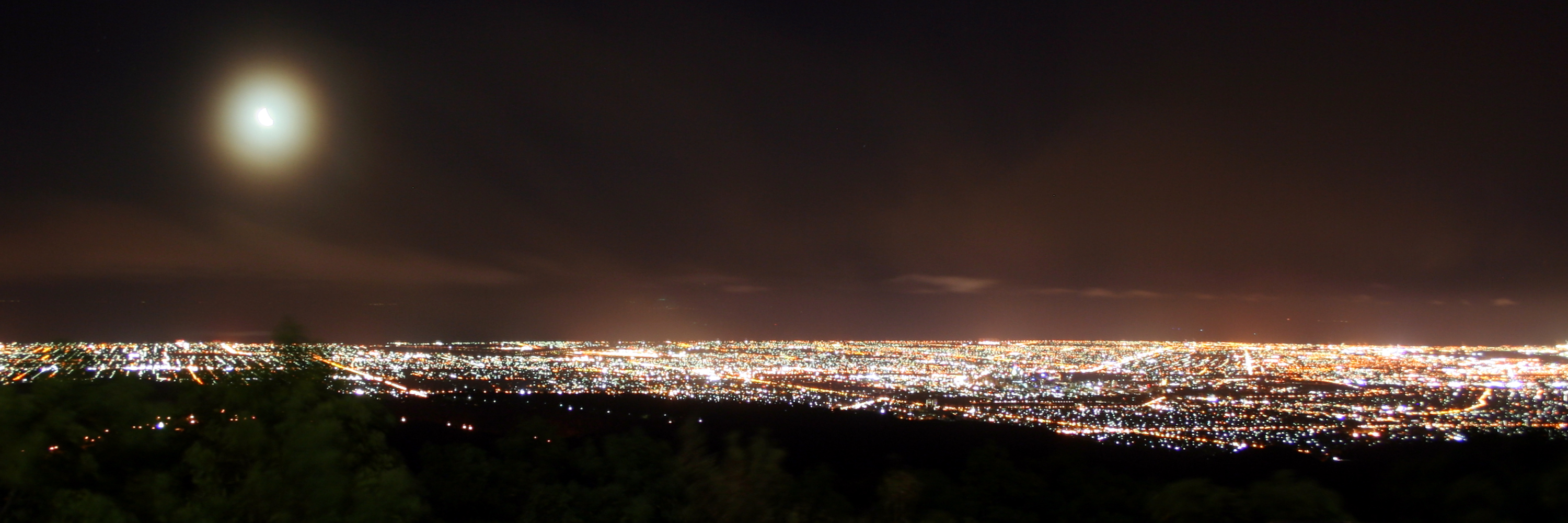
From Mount Lofty, 2007

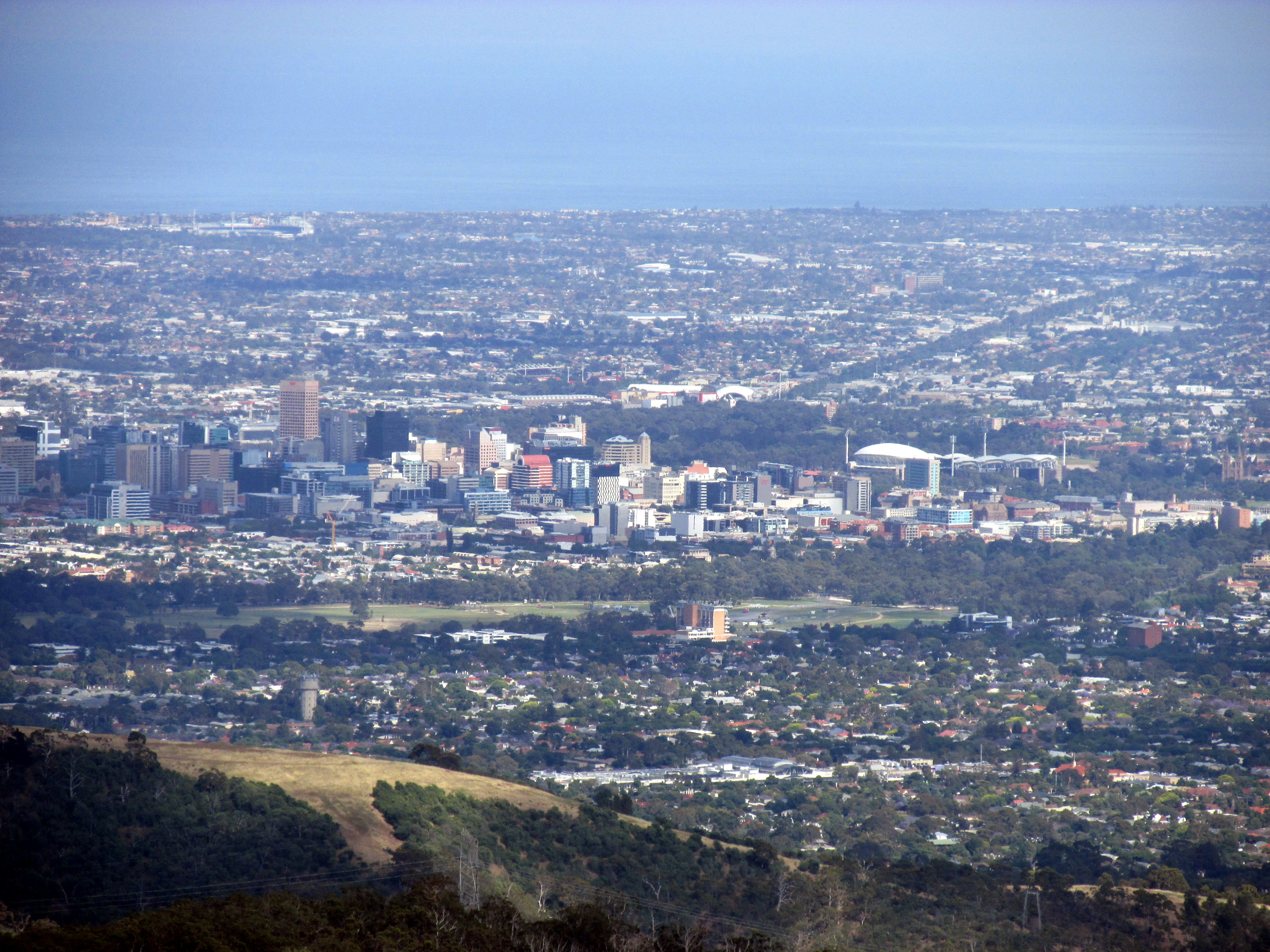
From Mount Lofty, 2014

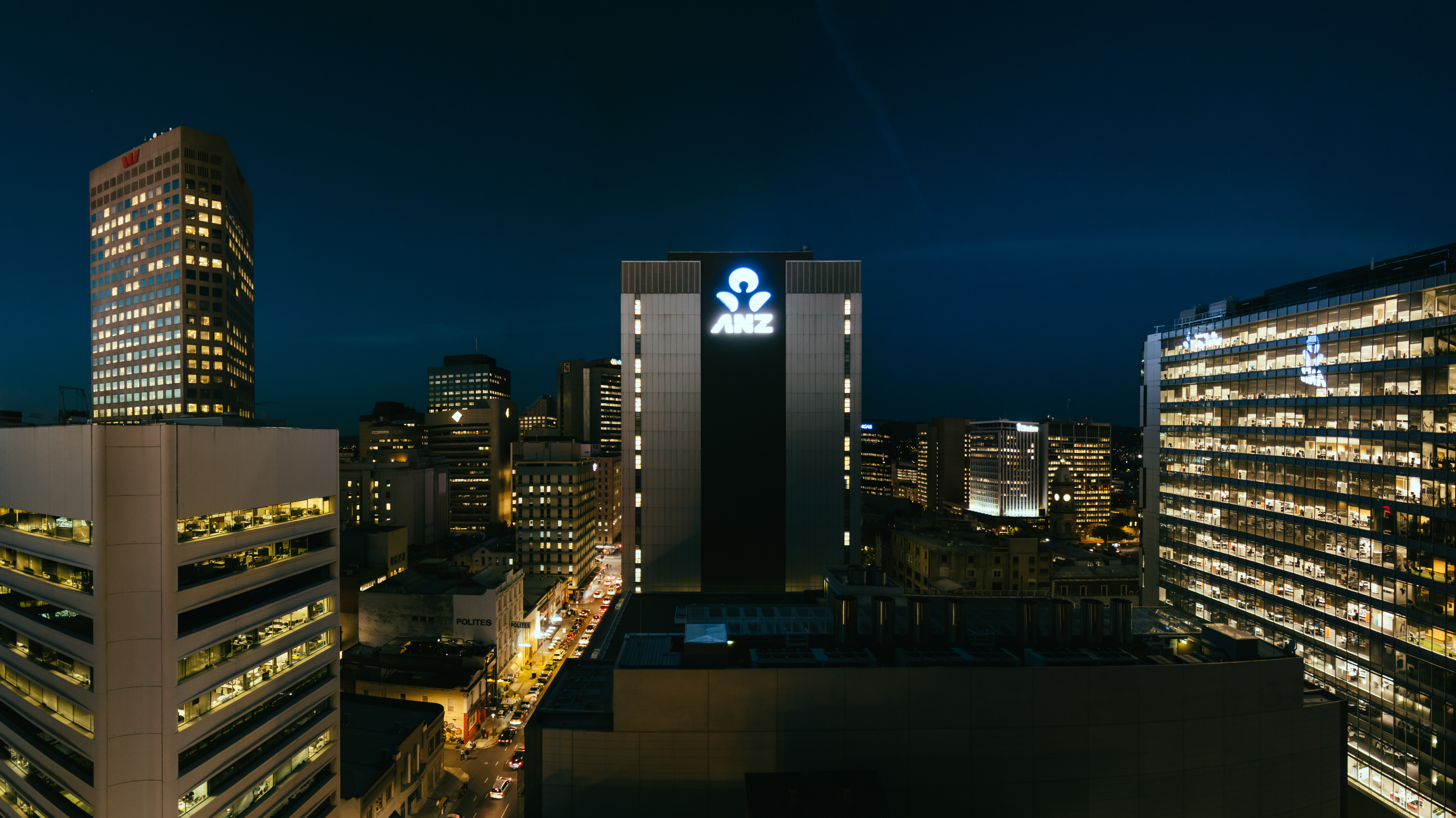
CBD with Waymouth Street to the left, 2014

From the south (west → east)

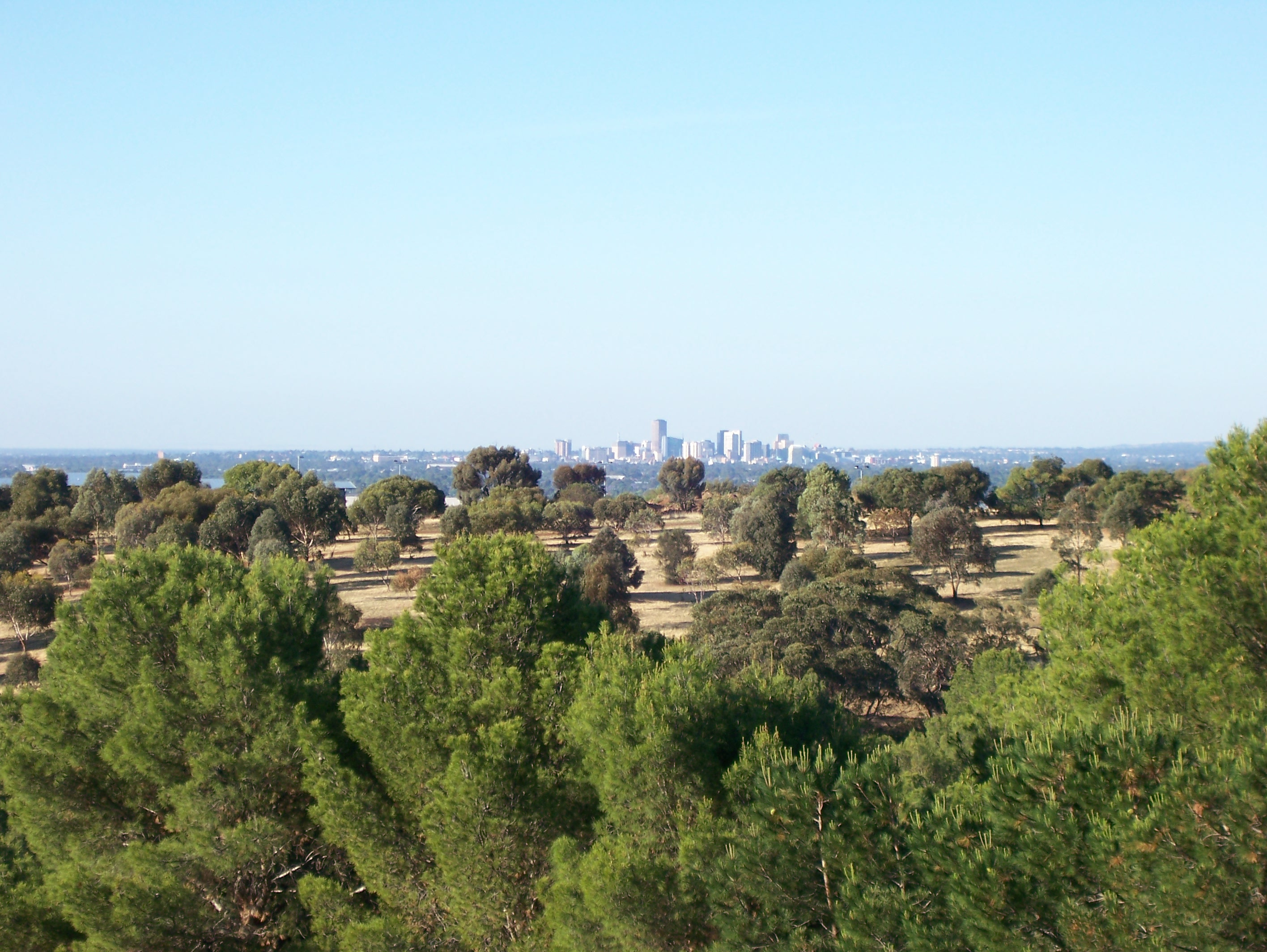
From Flinders University, 2006

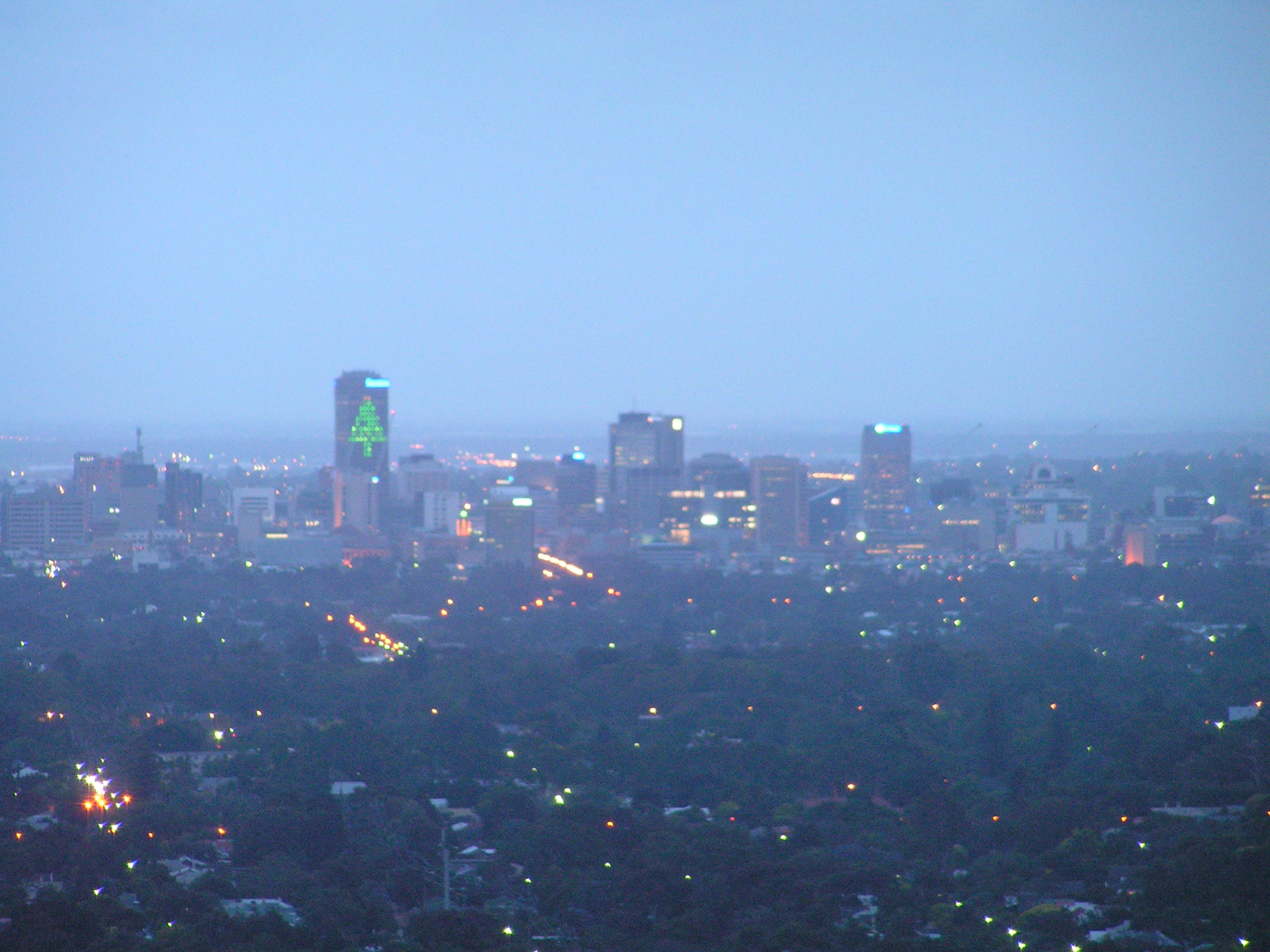
From about Panorama, 2005

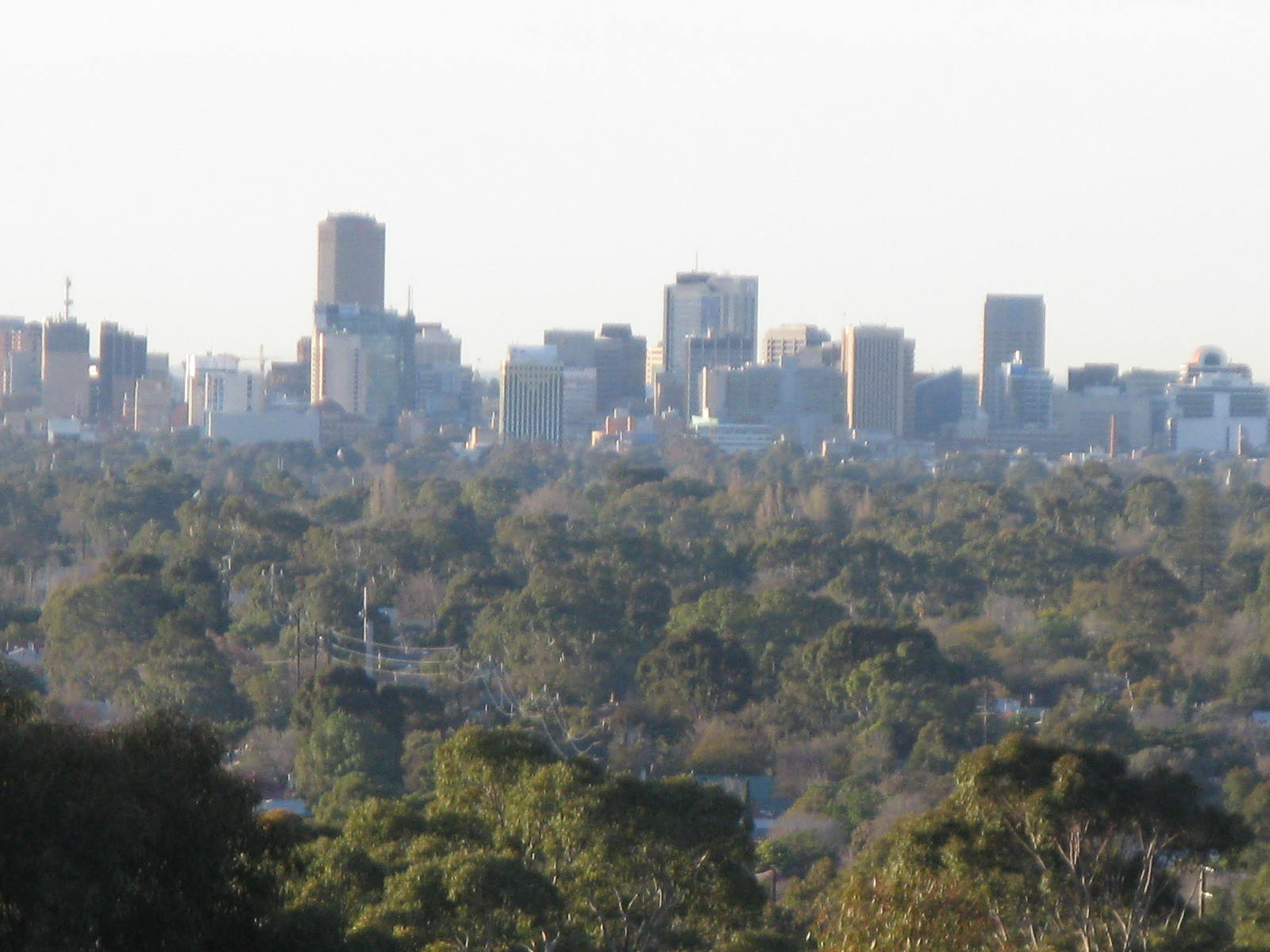
From Sleeps Hill station, 2008

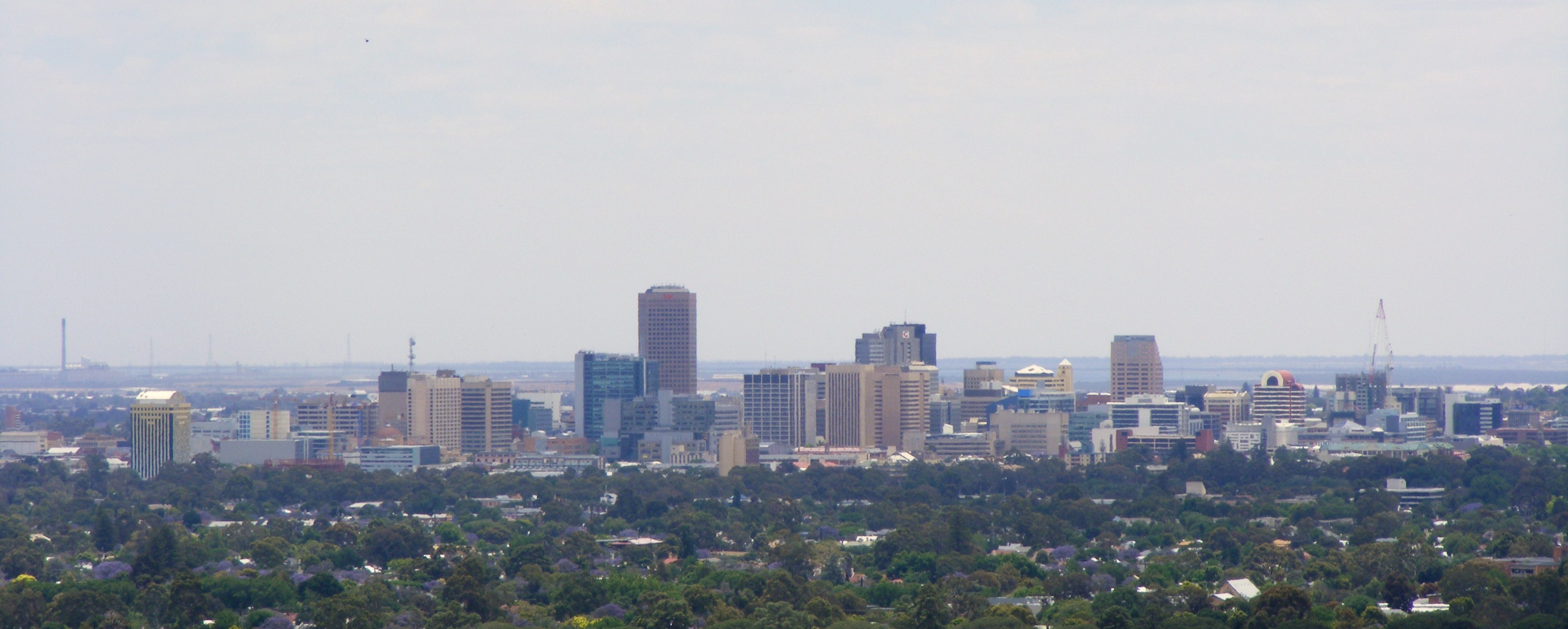
From Carrick Hill, 2008

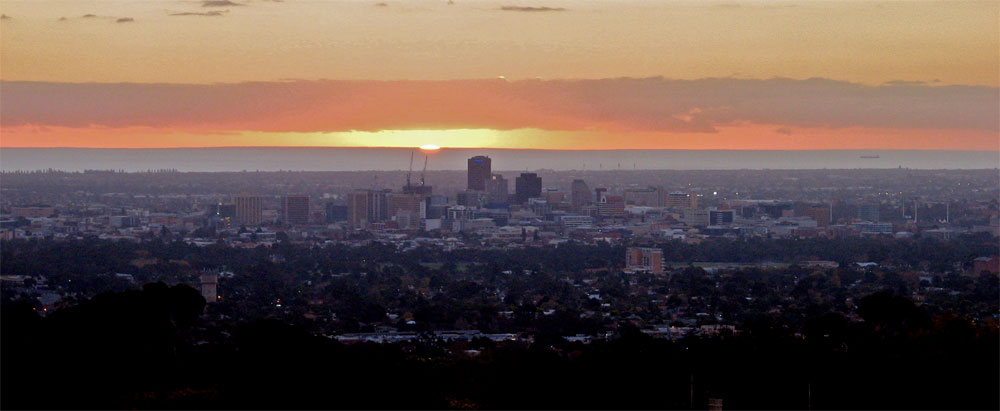
From about Glen Osmond, 2006

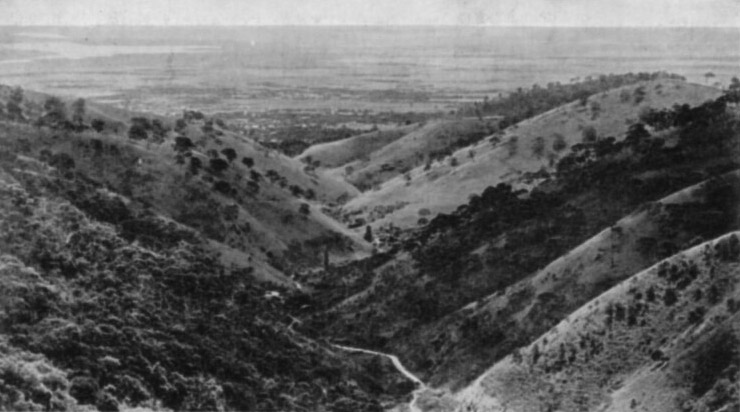
From Eagle on the Hill, 1910

From the west

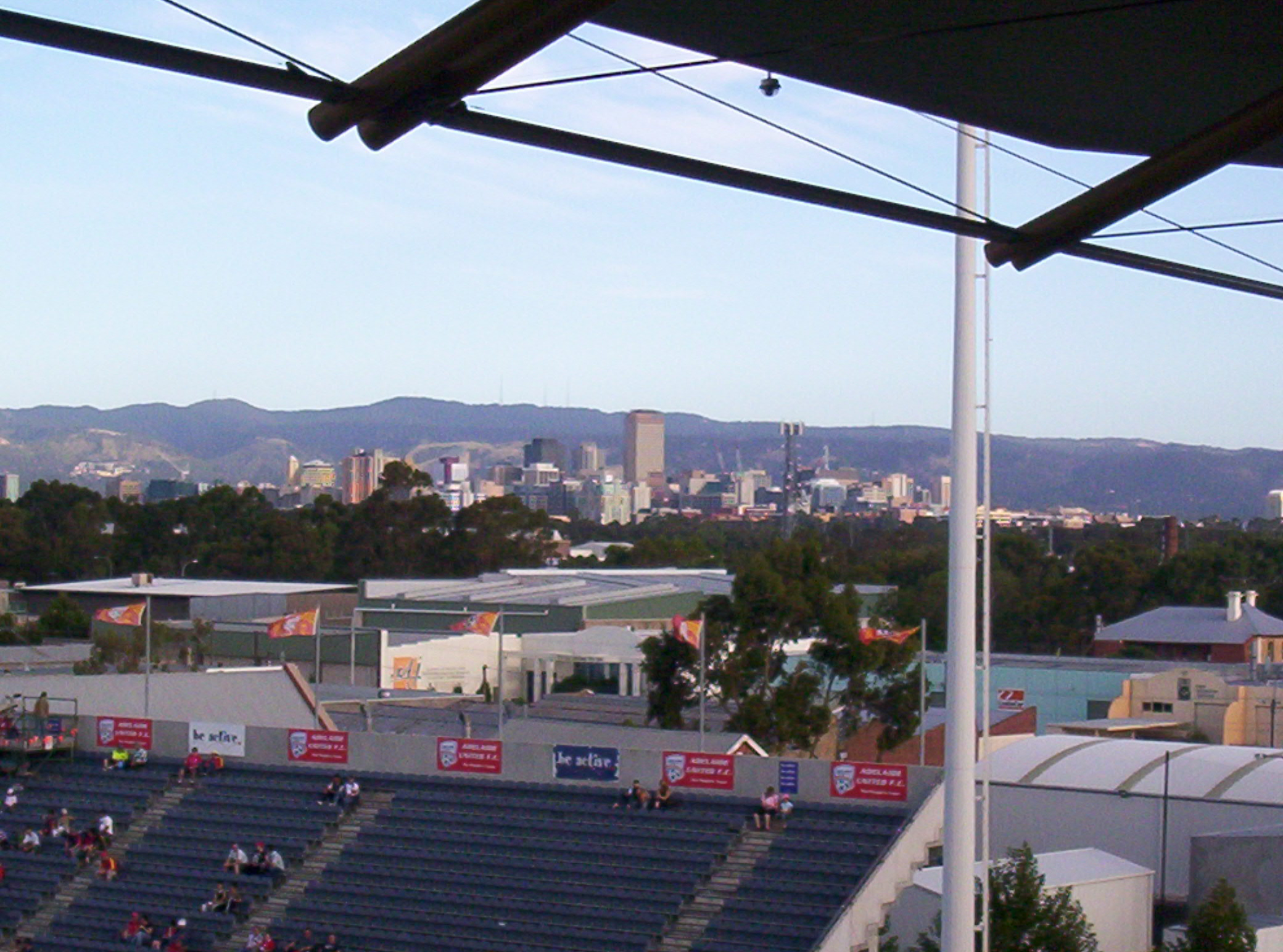
From Hindmarsh Stadium, 2007

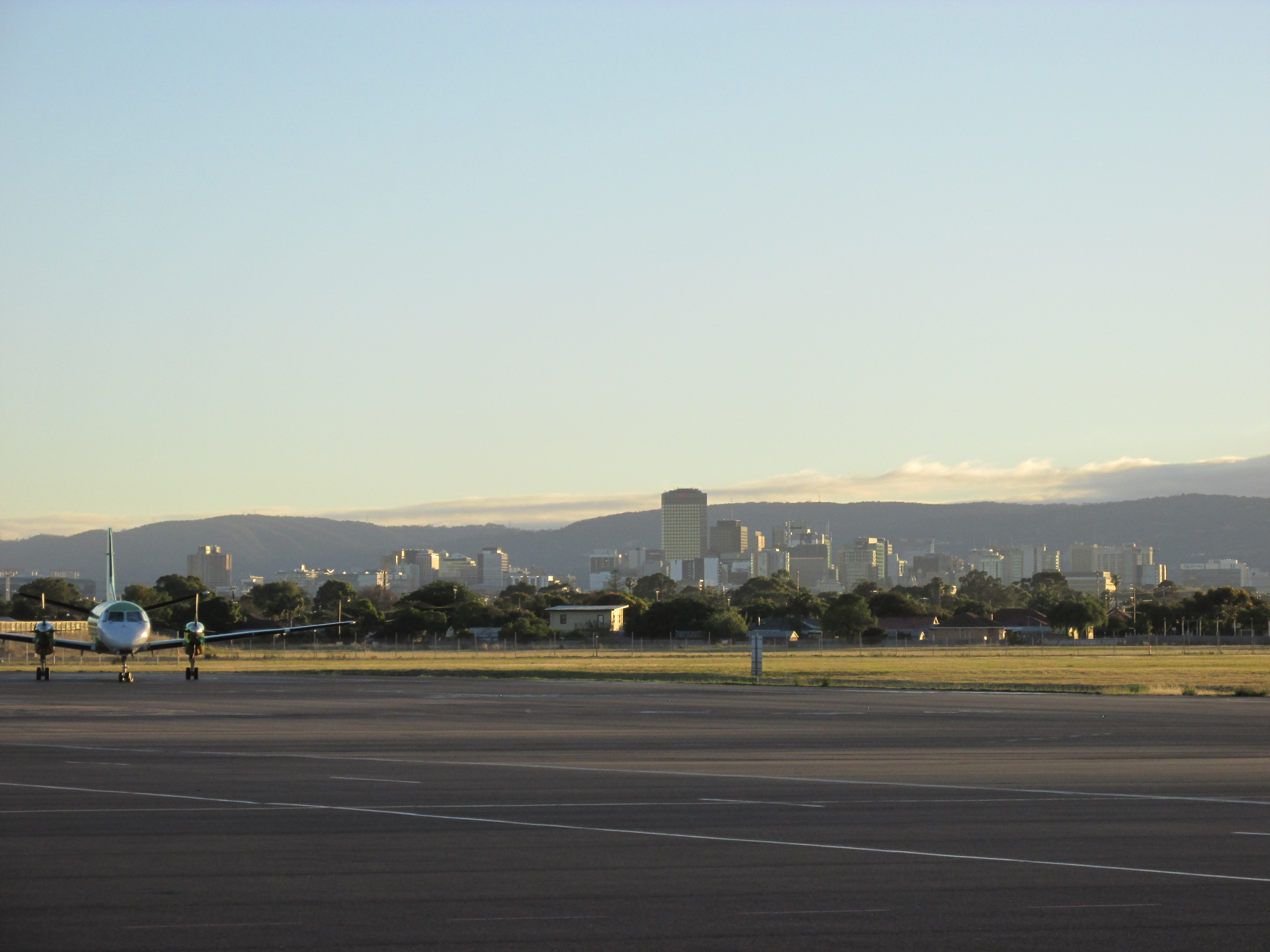
From Adelaide Airport, 2014

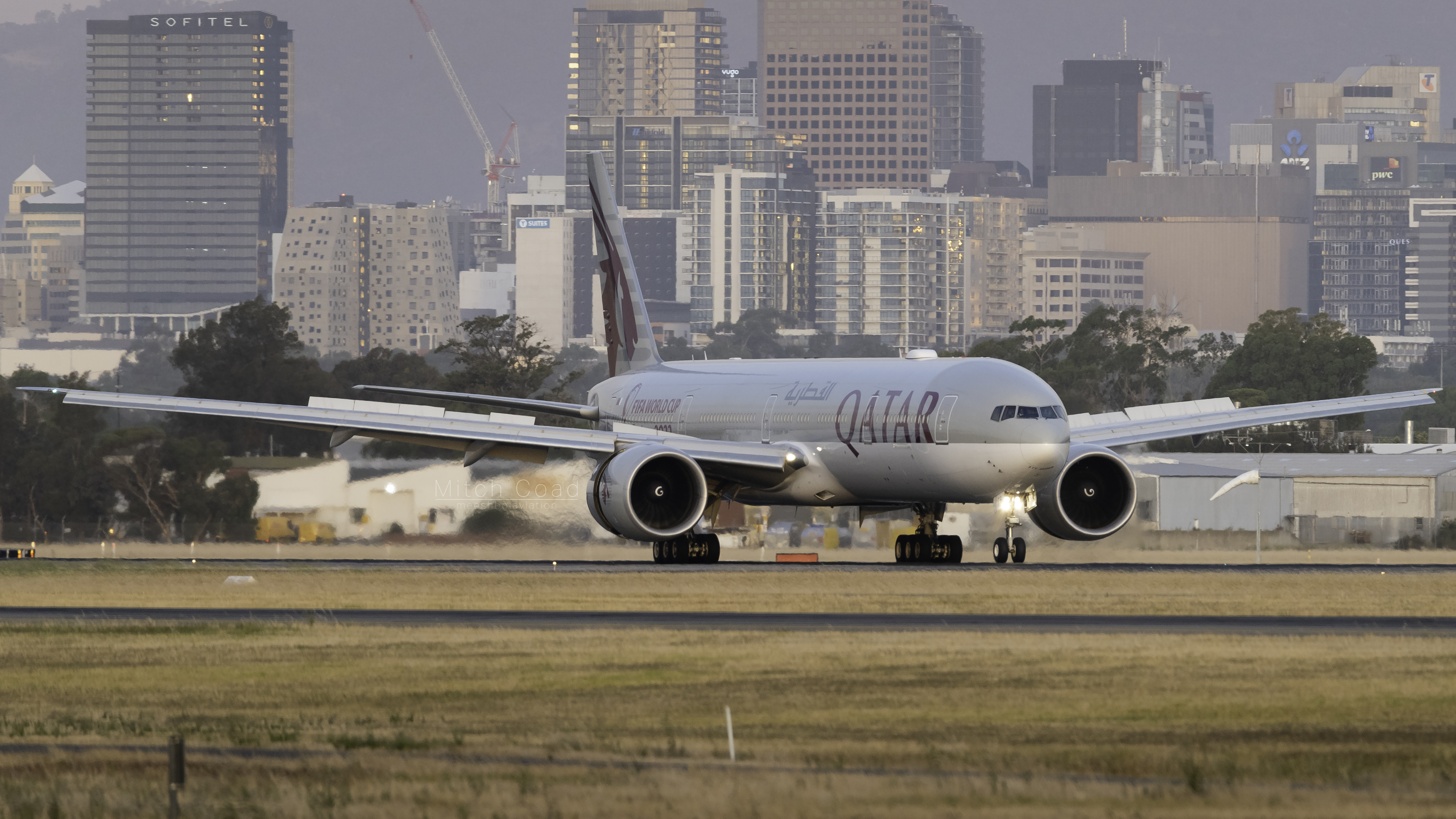
From Adelaide Airport, 2023

== See also ==
- Adelaide (Greater Adelaide metropolis)
- City of Adelaide (local government area)
- North Adelaide
- Street art in Adelaide
- Grid layout

== Select bibliography ==
- Spence, Catherine Helen; Beams, Maryan (2006). Susan Magarey; Barbara Wall; Maryan Beams; Mary Lyons (eds.). Ever yours, C.H. Spence: Catherine Helen Spence's An autobiography (1825-1910), Diary (1894) and Some correspondence (1894-1910). Wakefield Press. ISBN 978-1-86254-656-1.
