= Guillaume (given name) =

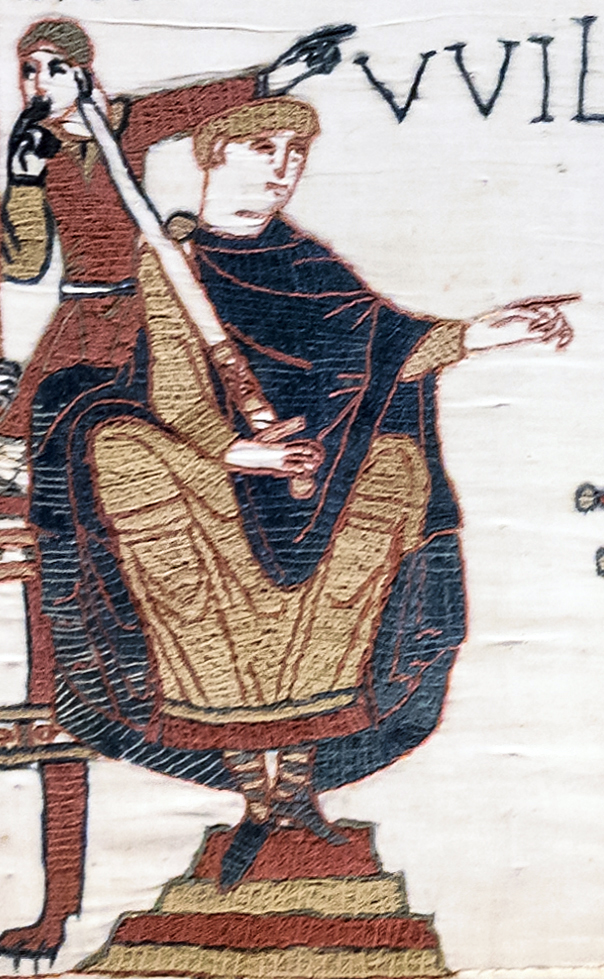
- Guillaume le Conquérant (William the Conqueror)
- Pronunciation: [ɡijom]
- Gender: Male
- Language: Germanic languages

Origin
- Origin: wille + helm (protection)
- Meaning: Vehement protector
- Region of origin: Northern Europe

Other names
- Related names: Guillaume (surname), William

Guillaume is the French equivalent of William, which is of old Germanic origin from wille + helm (resolute protector). It is an Oïl form corresponding to Occitan Guilhem and the Catalan form Guillem.

People with this given name include:

== Aristocrats ==
- William the Conqueror (c. 1028–1087), in French Guillaume le Conquérant, Norman conqueror of England
- William of Gellone (755-812/14), in French Guillaume d'Orange, Count of Toulouse and hero of the epic poem Chanson de Guillaume
- William IV, Grand Duke of Luxembourg (1852–1912)
- Guillaume V (disambiguation)
- Prince Guillaume of Luxembourg (born 1963)

== A ==
- Guillaume Amontons (1663–1705), French scientific instrument inventor and physicist
- Guillaume Apollinaire (1880–1918), French poet, writer and art critic

== B ==
- Guillaume Barazzone (born 1982), Italian-Swiss politician
- Guillaume de Salluste Du Bartas (1544–1590), Gascon Huguenot courtier and poet
- Guillaume du Bellay, seigneur de Langey (1491–1543), French diplomat and general
- Guillaume de Bellecombe (1728–1792), Governor General of Réunion, Saint-Domingue and Pondichéry, and a Republican revolutionary
- Guillaume Beuzelin (born 1979), French football coach and former player
- Guillaume Cornelis van Beverloo (1922–2010), Dutch artist better known under the pseudonym Corneille
- Guillaume Bigourdan (1851–1932), French astronomer
- Guillaume aux Blanches Mains (1135–1202), French Catholic cardinal
- Guillaume de Bonne-Carrere (1754–1825), French diplomat
- Guillaume Briçonnet (cardinal) (1445–1514), French cardinal and statesman
- Guillaume Briçonnet (Bishop of Meaux) (1472–1534), son of the cardinal
- Guillaume Brune (1764–1815), French soldier, Marshal of the Empire under Napoleon
- Guillaume Budé (1467–1540), French scholar and humanist

== C ==
- Guillaume Cale (died 1358), French peasant rebel leader
- Guillaume Canet (born 1973), French actor
- Guillaume de Chartres (disambiguation)
- Guillaume Amfrye de Chaulieu (1639–1720), French writer
- Guillaume Cheval dit St-Jacques (1828–1880), Canadian politician
- Guillaume Cizeron (born 1994), French ice dancer
- Guillaume Costeley ((1530, possibly 1531–1606), French composer
- Guillaume Courtois (1628–1679), French painter and etcher
- Guillaume Coustou the Elder (1677–1746), French sculptor
- Guillaume Coustou the Younger (1716–1777), French sculptor, son of the above

== D ==
- Guillaume Dah Zadi (born 1978), Ivorian footballer
- Guillaume Delisle (1675–1726), French cartographer
- Guillaume Daniel Delprat (1856–1937), Dutch-Australian metallurgist, mining engineer, and businessman
- Guillaume Depardieu (1971–2008), French actor
- Guillaume Deschênes-Thériault (born 1994), Canadian politician
- Guillaume Dode de la Brunerie
- Guillaume Dubois (1775–1851), French soldier and Marshal of France
- Guillaume Duchenne de Boulogne (1806–1875), French neurologist
- Guillaume Du Fay (1397–1474), Franco–Flemish composer and music theorist
- Guillaume Henri Dufour (1787–1875), Swiss general and topographer who presided over the convention that established the International Red Cross
- Guillaume Dufresne d'Arsel, 18th-century French colonial governor of Mauritius
- Guillaume Philibert Duhesme (1766–1815), French general, politician and writer, commander of Napoleon's Imperial Guard
- Guillaume Dupuytren (1777–1835), French anatomist and surgeon
- Guillaume Durand (c. 1230–1296), French canonist, liturgical writer, and Bishop of Mende
- Guillaume Durand (nephew) (died 1328 or 1330), French clergyman and canonist, nephew of the above
- Guillaume Durand (journalist) (born 1952), French journalist

== E ==
- Guillaume Elmont (born 1981), Dutch judoka
- Guillaume d'Estouteville (c. 1412–1483), French aristocrat, archbishop, and cardinal

== F ==
- Guillaume Faury (born 1968), French engineer and businessman, current chief executive officer at the aerospace corporation Airbus SE and current chairman of its civil aircraft division, Airbus SAS
- Guillaume Faye (1949–2019), French political theorist, journalist, writer, and leading member of the French New Right
- Guillaume Fichet (1433–c. 1480), French scholar
- Guillaume de Fondaumière (born 1971), French video game producer

== G ==
- Guillaume Gallienne (born 1972), French actor, screenwriter, and film director
- Guillaume Gamelin Gaucher (1810–1885), Canadian businessman and politician
- Guillaume Geefs (1805–1883), Belgian sculptor
- Guillaume de Gisors (1219–1307), Norman lord
- Guillaume Gontard (born 1971), French politician
- Guillaume Gouffier, seigneur de Bonnivet (c. 1488–1525), French soldier
- Guillaume Groen van Prinsterer (1801–1876), Dutch politician and historian
- Guillaume Guiart, French chronicler and poet

== H ==
- Guillaume Emmanuel de Homem-Christo (born 1974), better known as Guy-Manuel, French musician, record producer, disc jockey, singer-songwriter, and composer

== K ==
- Guillaume Knecht, rugby league footballer of the 1990s and 2000s

== L ==
- Guillaume de Lamoignon de Blancmesnil (1683–1772), French magistrate
- Guillaume Langlois, Quebec politician
- Guillaume Latendresse (born 1987), Canadian retired National Hockey League player
- Guillaume LeBlanc (born 1962), Canadian former race walker
- Guillaume Lefebvre (born 1981), Canadian retired National Hockey League player
- Guillaume Le Gentil (1725–1792), French astronomer
- Guillaume Legrant (fl. 1405–1449), French composer
- Guillaume Lekeu (1870–1894), Belgian composer
- Guillaume de l'Hôpital (1661–1704), French mathematician
- Guillaume de Lorris (c. 1200–c. 1240), French scholar and poet

== M ==
- Guillaume de Machaut (1300–1377), French composer and poet
- Guillaume Metten (1938-2020), Belgian diplomat
- Guillaume Mombaerts (1902-1993), Belgian pianist
- Guillaume Morel (1505–1564), French classical scholar

== N ==
- Guillaume de Nogaret (c. 1260–1313), French politician, councilor and keeper of the seal to Philip IV of France

== P ==
- Guillaume Patry, Canadian retired StarCraft professional player
- Guillaume Pellicier (c. 1490–1568), French prelate and diplomat
- Guillaume Postel (1510–1581), French linguist, orientalist, astronomer, Christian Kabbalist, diplomat, polyglot, professor, religious universalist, and writer
- Guillaume Poyet (c. 1473–1548), French magistrate
- Guillaume de Puylaurens (after 1200–1274 or later), French Latin chronicler

== R ==
- Guillaume Raoux (born 1970), French former tennis player
- Guillaume Thomas François Raynal (1713–1796), French writer and man of letters
- Guillaume Rocheron (born 1981), Oscar-winning French visual effects supervisor
- Guillaume Rondelet (1507–1566), French professor of medicine at the University of Montpellier

== S ==
- Guillaume Sarkozy (born 1951), French textile entrepreneur and vice-president of the MEDEF, the French union of employers
- Guillaume Sayer (1799–1868), Métis fur trader
- Guillaume de Sonnac (died 1250), French Grand Master of the Knights Templar from 1247 to 1250
- Guillaume Soro (born 1972), Ivorian politician

== T ==
- Guillaume de Tonquédec (born 1966), French actor

== V ==
- Guillaume du Vair (1556–1621), French bishop, author, lawyer, Magistrate of the Parliament, and Keeper of the Seals of France
- Guillaume Vigneault (born 1970), Canadian novelist

== W ==
- Guillaume Warmuz (born 1970), French football coach and former goalkeeper

== Fictional characters ==
- Guillaume (Centuria), mace-wielding Commander Knight in the Japanese web manga Centuria
- Guillaume Tarrant, a character in the TV series Oz

== See also ==
- Guillaume (surname)
- Guillaume (disambiguation)
