= List of protected heritage sites in Visé =

This table shows an overview of the protected heritage sites in the Walloon town Visé. This list is part of Belgium's national heritage.

Object	Year/architect	Town/section	Address	Coordinates	Number^{?}	Image
town hall ^{(nl)} ^{(fr)}		Wezet	rue des Récollets n°1	50.735048°N 5.693543°E	62108-CLT-0001-01 Info	Raadhuis
St. Martin's Church: choir ^{(nl)} ^{(fr)}		Wezet		50.733178°N 5.695915°E	62108-CLT-0002-01 Info	Kerk Saint-Martin: koor
Church of Notre-Dame du Mont Carmel ^{(nl)} ^{(fr)}		Wezet		50.738043°N 5.685461°E	62108-CLT-0003-01 Info	Kerk Notre-Dame du Mont Carmel
Ensemble of the Lorette chapel, the farm at the sanctuary and the surrounding area ^{(nl)} ^{(fr)}		Wezet	rue Porte de Lorette.	50.732043°N 5.697584°E	62108-CLT-0004-01 Info	Ensemble van de kapel Lorette, de boerderij bij het heiligdom en het omringende gebied
Castle Saroléa and the ensemble of the castle and its surroundings ^{(nl)} ^{(fr)}		Wezet		50.678858°N 5.668606°E	62108-CLT-0005-01 Info	Kasteel van Saroléa en het ensemble van het kasteel en diens omgeving
Thiers of Lanaye, vineyards Nivelle, on the eastern slopes of the Montagne Saint-Pierre ^{(nl)} ^{(fr)}		Wezet		50.767267°N 5.663639°E	62108-CLT-0006-01 Info	
Church of Saint-Lambert ^{(nl)} ^{(fr)}		Wezet		50.754973°N 5.679262°E	62108-CLT-0008-01 Info	Kerk Saint-Lambert
Organs of the church Saint-Firmin ^{(nl)} ^{(fr)}		Wezet		50.716130°N 5.692432°E	62108-CLT-0011-01 Info	
Ile de la Meuse ^{(nl)} ^{(fr)}		Wezet		50.807827°N 5.694776°E	62108-CLT-0012-01 Info	
Coalmine of Hasard: phalanstery (facades and roofs) and tower No. 1 and its engine, and the ensemble of the garden, and its immediate surroundings and the ensemble of the mine with wooded hill in the east ^{(nl)} ^{(fr)}		Wezet		50.681295°N 5.669926°E	62108-CLT-0013-01 Info	Steenkolenmijn van Hasard: phalanstère (gevels en daken) en toren n°1 en diens machinekamers, en het ensemble van de tuin, en diens directe omgeving en het ensemble van de mijn beboste heuvel gelegen in het oosten
Air shafts called "Belle Fleur", a coal mine in Hasard ^{(nl)} ^{(fr)}		Wezet		50.680782°N 5.671998°E	62108-CLT-0014-01 Info	
Their de Caster, on the eastern slope of the Saint-Pierre ^{(nl)} ^{(fr)}		Wezet		50.802451°N 5.686337°E	62108-CLT-0015-01 Info	Thier de Caster, op de oostelijke helling van de Sint-Pietersberg
House facades and roofs, and pavement with pebbles ^{(nl)} ^{(fr)}		Wezet	rue de la Halle n°171	50.754864°N 5.679903°E	62108-CLT-0016-01 Info	Huis: gevels en daken, en trottoir met kiezels
House de la Tour: facades and roofs and the ensemble of the house, the park, the towpath and the River Meuse ^{(nl)} ^{(fr)}		Wezet	rue de Lixhe, n°186 (M) et ensemble formé par la maison, le parc, le chemin de halage et la rive de la Meuse (S)	50.755732°N 5.681030°E	62108-CLT-0017-01 Info	Huis de la Tour: gevels en daken en het ensemble van het huis, het park, het jaagpad en de oever van de Maas
House: walls and roofs ^{(nl)} ^{(fr)}		Wezet	rue F. Roosvelt n°19	50.737238°N 5.686444°E	62108-CLT-0018-01 Info	Huis: gevels en daken
Chapel Notre-Dame de Bon Secours and the ensemble of the building and its surroundings ^{(nl)} ^{(fr)}		Wezet		50.732173°N 5.686499°E	62108-CLT-0019-01 Info	Kapel Notre-Dame de Bon Secours en het ensemble van het gebouw en diens omgeving
House facades and roofs, and pavement with pebbles ^{(nl)} ^{(fr)}		Wezet	rue de la Halle, n°172	50.754858°N 5.679905°E	62108-CLT-0020-01 Info	
Thiers of Lanaye of Vignes and Nivelle on the eastern slope of the Saint-Pierre ^{(nl)} ^{(fr)}		Wezet		50.767267°N 5.663639°E	62108-PEX-0001-01 Info	
Their de Caster, on the eastern slope of the Saint-Pierre ^{(nl)} ^{(fr)}		Wezet		50.802451°N 5.686337°E	62108-PEX-0002-01 Info	

== See also ==
- List of protected heritage sites in Liège (province)
- Visé
