= San Guillermo Parish Church =

San Guillermo Parish Church may refer to:

- San Guillermo Parish Church (Bacolor), Pampanga, Philippines
- Magsingal Church, Ilocos Sur, Philippines

== See also ==
- San Guillermo
- Saint William (disambiguation)
