= Argenteau =

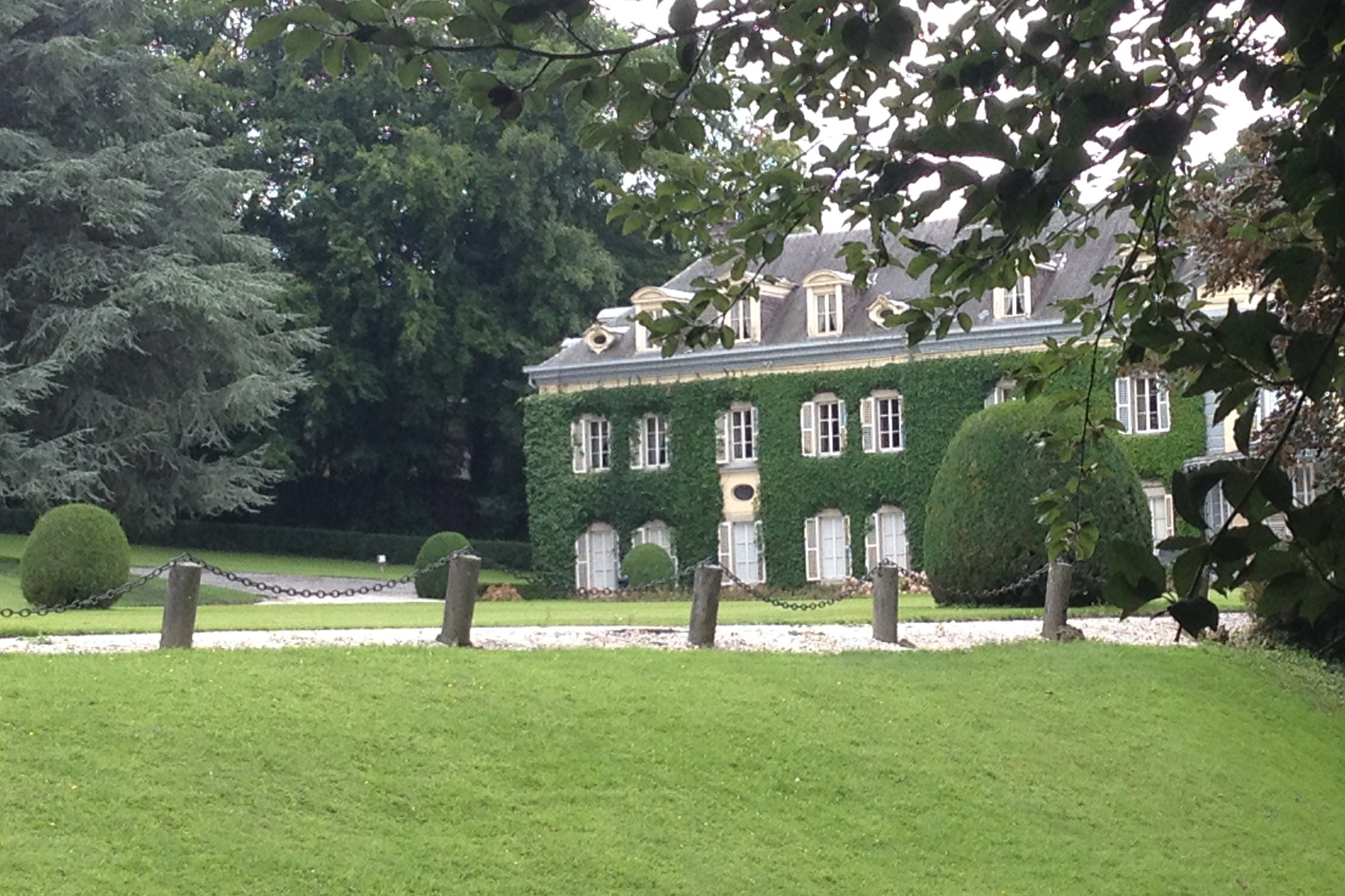
- Château d'Argenteau, Argenteau

- Coat of arms

- Location within Belgium Location within Europe
- Coordinates: 50°41′55″N 05°41′15″E
- Country: Belgium
- Region: Wallonia
- Province: Liège
- Municipality: Visé

Argenteau is a village and district of the municipality of Visé, located in the province of Liège in Wallonia, Belgium.

The first time the village is mentioned in written sources is in 1070, when it was a nominally independent fief within the Holy Roman Empire, but in practice ruled by the Duchy of Brabant. From the 11th century, the Prince-Bishop of Liège had a garrison in the castle, the Château d'Argenteau. Today the castle, rebuilt after its destruction by French troops in 1674, still exists in the village. The fortified farm buildings (ferme castrale) date from the late 17the and 18th centuries.
