= Guillaume (surname) =

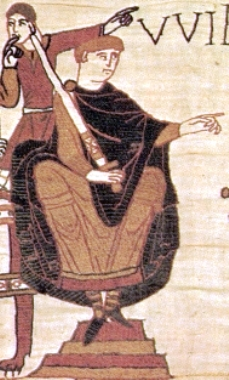
- Guillaume le Conquérant (William the Conqueror)
- Language: French

Origin
- Language: Germanic languages
- Meaning: Vehement protector (Will + helmet (protection))

Other names
- Anglicisation: William
- See also: Guillaume (given name)

Guillaume is the French equivalent of William (name), which is of old Germanic origin. Among its oldest, well-known carriers was Charlemagne's cousin William of Gellone.

People with this surname include:

- Albert Guillaume (1873–1942), French caricaturist
- Alfred Guillaume (1888–1966), British Islamic scholar
- Augustin Guillaume (1895–1983), French general
- Charles-Édouard Guillaume (1861–1938), French-Swiss physicist and Nobel laureate
- Didier Guillaume (1959–2025), French politician
- Edith Guillaume (1943–2013), Danish opera singer
- Droupgyu Wangmo, French Buddhist nun
- Günter Guillaume (1927–1995), a close aide to West German chancellor Willy Brandt who turned out to be a spy for East Germany's secret service
- Gustave Guillaume (1883–1960), French linguist
- Henri Guillaume (1812–1877), Belgian general and military historian
- Jacquette Guillaume (fl. 1665), French writer
- James Guillaume (1844–1916), Swiss anarchist
- Jean Guillaume (1918–2001), Belgian writer
- Jean-Baptiste Claude Eugène Guillaume (1822–1905), French sculptor
- Paul Guillaume (1891–1934), French art dealer
- Paul-Marie Guillaume (born 1929), French Roman Catholic bishop
- Pierre Guillaume (born 1941), French book-shop founder
- Robert Guillaume (1927–2017), American stage and television actor
- Sylvain Guillaume (born 1968), French skier

== See also ==
- Guillaume (given name)
- Guillaume (disambiguation)
