= Guillaume Metten =

Belgian diplomat (1938–2020)

Belgian Ambassador to Iran
- In office 28 Oct 1999 – 19 Feb 2003

Belgian Ambassador to India, Nepal, Bhutan, Sri Lanka, Maldives
- In office 3 Oct 1995 – 1999

Belgian Ambassador to Mauritania
- In office Nov 1991 – 1992

Belgian Ambassador to Morocco
- In office 1989–1992

Personal details
- Born: 19 July 1938 Argenteau, Visé, Belgium
- Died: 13 November 2020 (aged 82) Ixelles, Brussels, Belgium
- Spouse: Dorothea

Guillaume Metten (19 July 1938, Argenteau - 13 November 2020, Ixelles) was a Belgian diplomat and ambassador to Iran, India, Nepal, Bhutan, the Maldives,, Sri Lanka, Morocco, and Mauritania. After his retirement in 2003, he became vice president of the European Institute for International Law and International Relations.

== Career ==
Metten joined the Belgian diplomacy in 1965 and was assigned to the Brazzaville Embassy as attaché from 1967 to 1970. He passed a commercial exam from the central Belgian administration and became Secretary in the Ankara Embassy from 1971 to 1972. From there, he was appointed First Secretary of the Kigali Embassy (1972-1975). He worked as the designated counsellor in the Office of the Minister for Cooperation and Development (1975-1977), a counsellor in Warsaw (1977-1980), and Minister-Counsellor in Tokyo (1981-1982). He was then Deputy Chief of Staff for Minister of Foreign Affairs Leo Tindemans from 1982 to 1985.

His first ambassador role came in 1985, when he was placed in Dakar with responsibility to seven West African countries. In 1989, he left Senegal for a new position as Belgian Ambassador to Morocco in Rabat. Mauritania approved him as Ambassador Extraordinary and Plenipotentiary in 1991. He then worked as Chief of Field Staff in the Belgian central administration between 1992 and 1995 before being assigned as Ambassador to India in New Delhi, a role he held until 1999. Nepal, Bhutan, Maldives, and Sri Lanka were also under his jurisdiction at this time. His final assignment was as Ambassador to Iran; he lived in Tehran from 28 October 1999 to 19 February 2003, when he was honorably discharged so he could retire. He was promoted to Administrative First Class on 1 October 2001.

Metten spent his days in retirement focused on Middle Eastern and North African issues. He wrote several papers and attended conferences internationally. He was also Director of Research in the department of international relations at the European Institute for International Law and International Relations. In June 2011, he was one of six former European ambassadors who published an op-ed supporting Iran's right to own nuclear technology as part of the standing international agreement for mutually-assured destruction. The other ambassadors who co-authored the paper were Richard Dalton (UK), Steen Hohwü-Christensen (Sweden), Paul von Maltzahn (Germany), Guillaume Metten (Belgium), François Nicoullaud (France), and Roberto Toscano (Italy).
