= Guillaume =

Guillaume may refer to:

== People ==
- Guillaume (given name), a list of people
- Guillaume (surname), the French equivalent of Williams

== Places ==
- Guillaume (crater), a lunar crater
- Guillaumes, Vence, Nice, Alpes-Maritimes, Provence-Alpes-Côte d'Azur, France, a commune

== See also ==
- Chanson de Guillaume, an 11th or 12th century poem
- Saint-Guillaume (disambiguation)
- Guillaume affair, a Cold War espionage scandal that led to the resignation of West German Chancellor Willi Brandt
