= Saint-Guillaume (disambiguation) =

Saint Guillaume is the French equivalent for Saint William. It may refer to the following place names:

- Saint-Guillaume, a commune in the Isère department in south-eastern France
- Saint-Guillaume, Quebec, a municipality in the Centre-du-Québec region of southwestern Quebec, Canada
- Saint-Guillaume-Nord, Quebec, an unorganized territory in the Lanaudière region of Quebec, Canada
- Saint-Guillaume, Cheese compagnie, a cheese maker in Montréal of Quebec, Canada

== See also ==
- Guillaume (disambiguation)
