= William of Chartres =

William of Chartres or Guillaume de Chartres may refer to:

- Guillaume de Ferrières (d. ?1204), vidame of Chartres and troubadour
- William of Chartres (Templar) (d. 1219), grand master of the Knights Templar
- William of Chartres (Dominican) (d. c. 1280), chaplain and biographer of Louis IX of France
