= Saint William =

Saint William may refer to:

- Saint William of Gellone (755 – 812 or 814), second Count of Toulouse
- Saint William of Volpiano (962 – 1031), monastic reformer and architect
- Saint William Firmatus (1026 – 1103), hermit
- Saint William of Montevergine (d. 1142), abbot
- Saint William of Norwich (c. 1132 – 1144), apprentice tanner
- Saint William of York (d. 1154), Archbishop
- Saint William of Maleval or Saint William the Great (d. 1157), hermit
- Saint William of Perth, the patron saint of adopted children, killed by his adoptive son c. 1201
- Saint William of Æbelholt (c. 1125 – 1203), also known as William of Paris or William of the Paraclete, French ecclesiastic active in Denmark
- Saint William of Donjeon (c. 1155 – 1209), also known as William of Bourges, William the Confessor or William Berroyer, Archbishop of Bourges
- Saint William Laud (1573 - 1645), Archbishop of Canterbury and martyr

== See also ==
- Saint-Guillaume (disambiguation), French equivalent of Saint William
- William (disambiguation)
