= Guillaume Knecht =

French rugby league footballer

Personal information
- Full name: Guillaume Knecht

Playing information
- Position: Second-row
Club
| Years | Team | Pld | T | G | FG | P |
|---|---|---|---|---|---|---|
| 1997 | Featherstone Rovers | 0+1 | 0 | 0 | 0 | 0 |
| ≤2007–≥07 | Pia | ≥1 | ≥0 | ≥0 | ≥0 | ≥0 |
| | Total |

Guillaume Knecht is a former professional rugby league footballer who played in the 1990s and 2000s. He played at club level for Featherstone Rovers, and Pia, as a second-row.

== Playing career ==
Guillaume Knecht made his debut for Featherstone Rovers on Sunday 3 August 1997.

== Note ==
Guillaume Knecht's forename is occasionally spelled incorrectly as Guilleme.
