= Visé =

City in Liège Province, Wallonia, Belgium

Visé Vizé (Walloon): Wezet (Dutch)
- Municipality
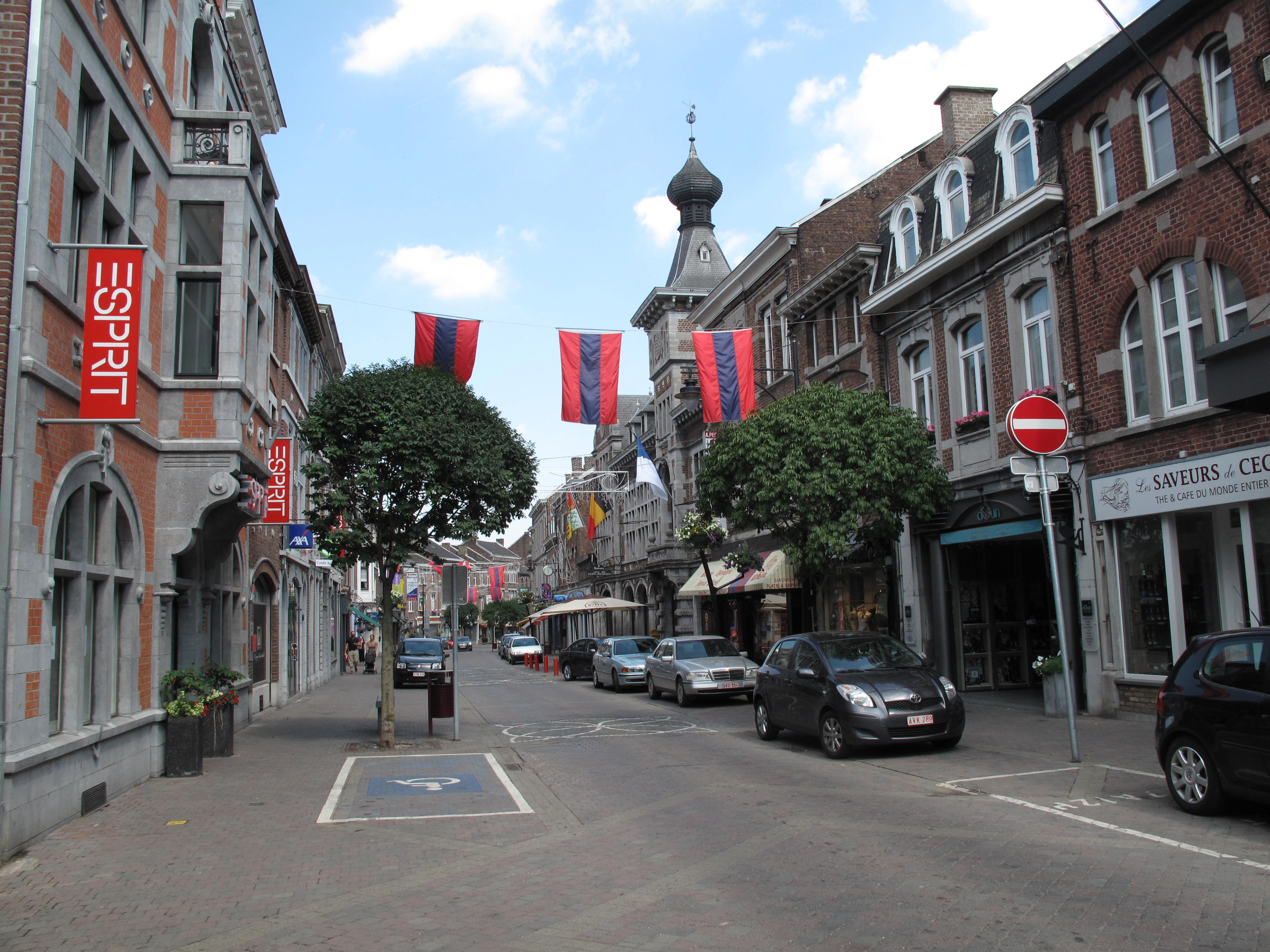

- Flag Coat of arms

- Location of Visé in Liège province
- Interactive map of Visé
- Location in Belgium
- Coordinates: 50°44′N 05°42′E
- Country: Belgium
- Community: French Community
- Region: Wallonia
- Province: Liège
- Arrondissement: Liège

Government
  - Mayor: Viviane Dessart (MR)
  - Governing party: MR - PS

Area
  - Total: 27.73 km^{2} (10.71 sq mi)

Population (2018-01-01)
  - Total: 17,767
  - Density: 640.7/km^{2} (1,659/sq mi)
- Postal codes: 4600-4602
- NIS code: 62108
- Area codes: 04
- Website: www.vise.be

Visé (French pronunciation: [vize]; Dutch: Wezet, Dutch pronunciation: [ˈʋeːzɛt]; Walloon: Vizé) is a city and municipality of Wallonia, located on the river Meuse in the province of Liège, Belgium.

The municipality consists of the following districts: Argenteau, Cheratte, Lanaye, Lixhe, Richelle, and Visé.

In the north-east (on the eastern bank of the Meuse) the area of the municipality extends up to the village of Moelingen in the Limburgian municipality of Voeren, while in the north-west (on the western bank of the Meuse) it extends up to the border between Belgium and the Netherlands (on the other side of which the Dutch municipality of Maastricht is situated).

The city of Visé is located some 20 km (12.4 miles) north-east of Liège and some 15 km (9,3 miles) south of Maastricht.

In addition to the Meuse, the Albert Canal also passes through this town.

== History ==
The Germans entered Belgium on 4 August 1914, and entered Visé that day as part of the opening movements of the Battle of Liège. A small group of Belgian gendarmes opposed the advancing Germans and two of their number, Auguste Bouko and Jean-Pierre Thill, were killed in the action becoming the first Belgian casualties of World War I. On 7 August, in the Lixhe section of the town, the German 90th Infantry Regiment killed eleven civilians and destroyed eleven houses. By 17 August 1914, forty-two civilians were killed, and 586 out of the village's 840 houses had been destroyed.

The Lixhe part of the town was also the site of one of Belgium's ninety eastern-frontier advanced-warning posts (postes d'alerte de la frontière est), aimed at preventing a German invasion in 1939 – its number was "PA 0". The coal mine of Hasard de Cheratte was dug in Cheratte and exploited between 1850 and 1977.

== Gallery ==
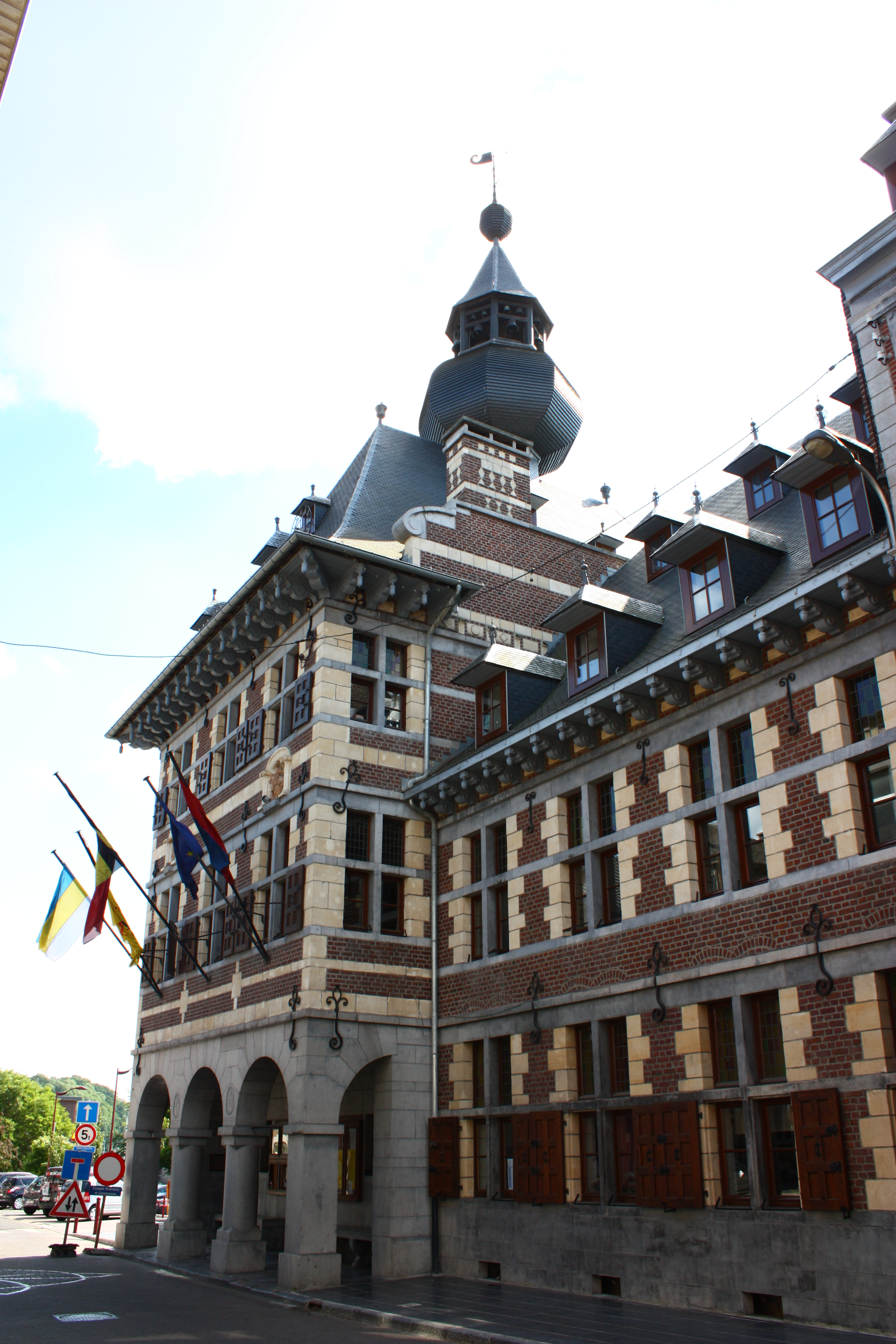
Visé town hall

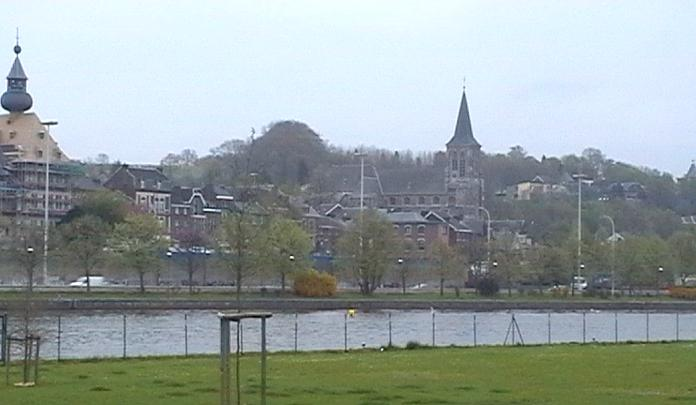
City view from the west bank of the Meuse

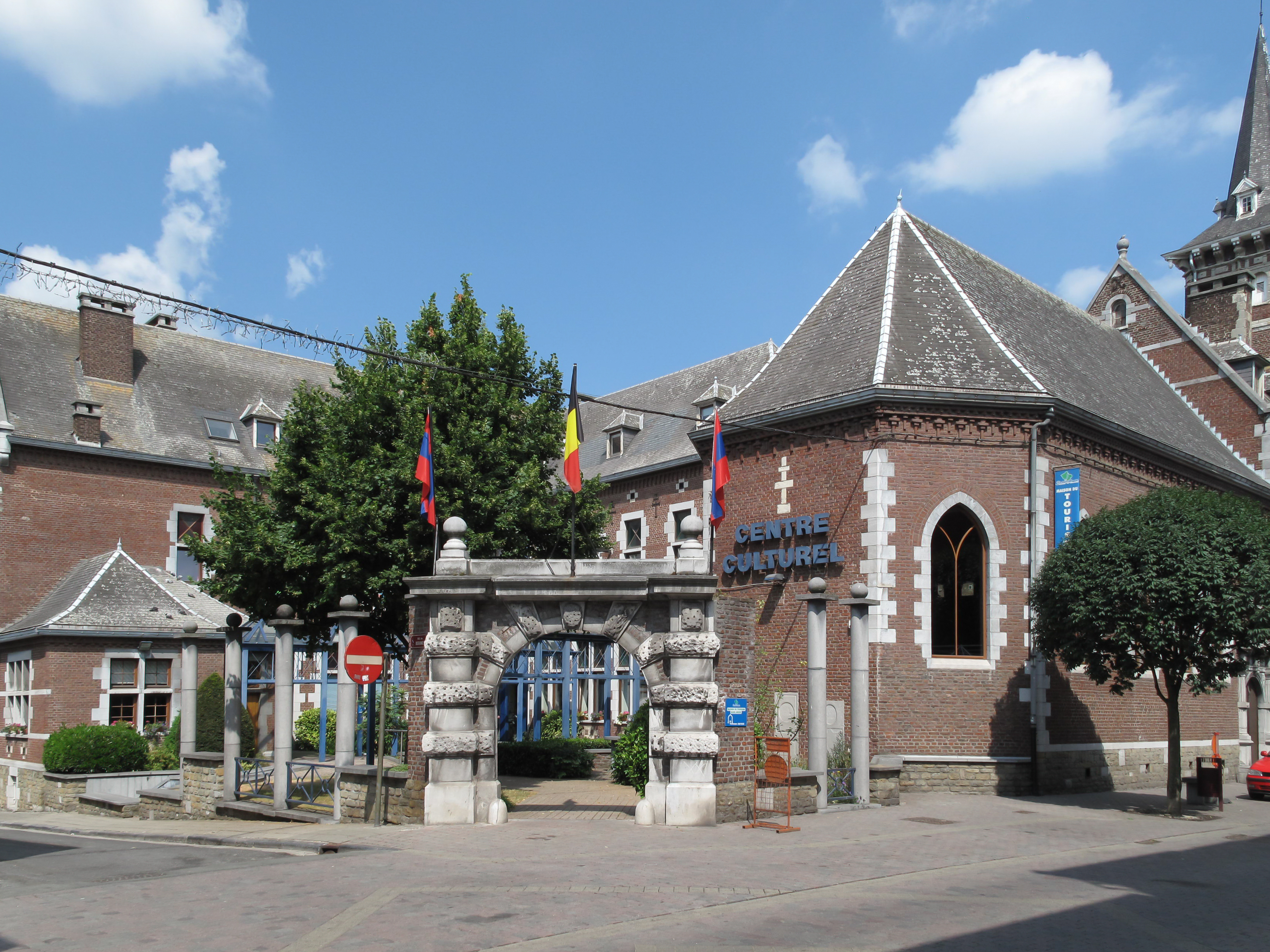
Cultural centre in Visé

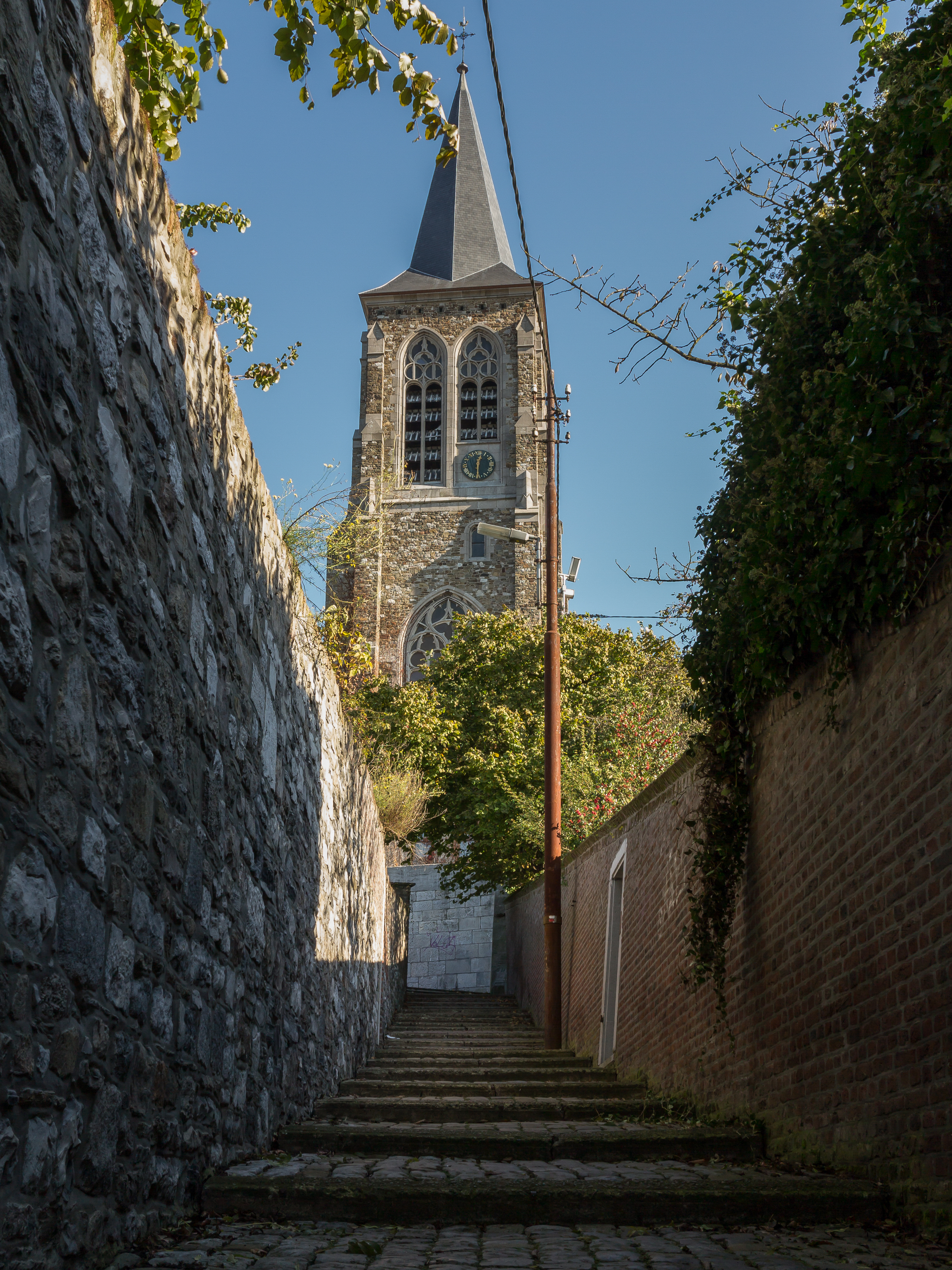
Church (Église Saint Martin) in Visé

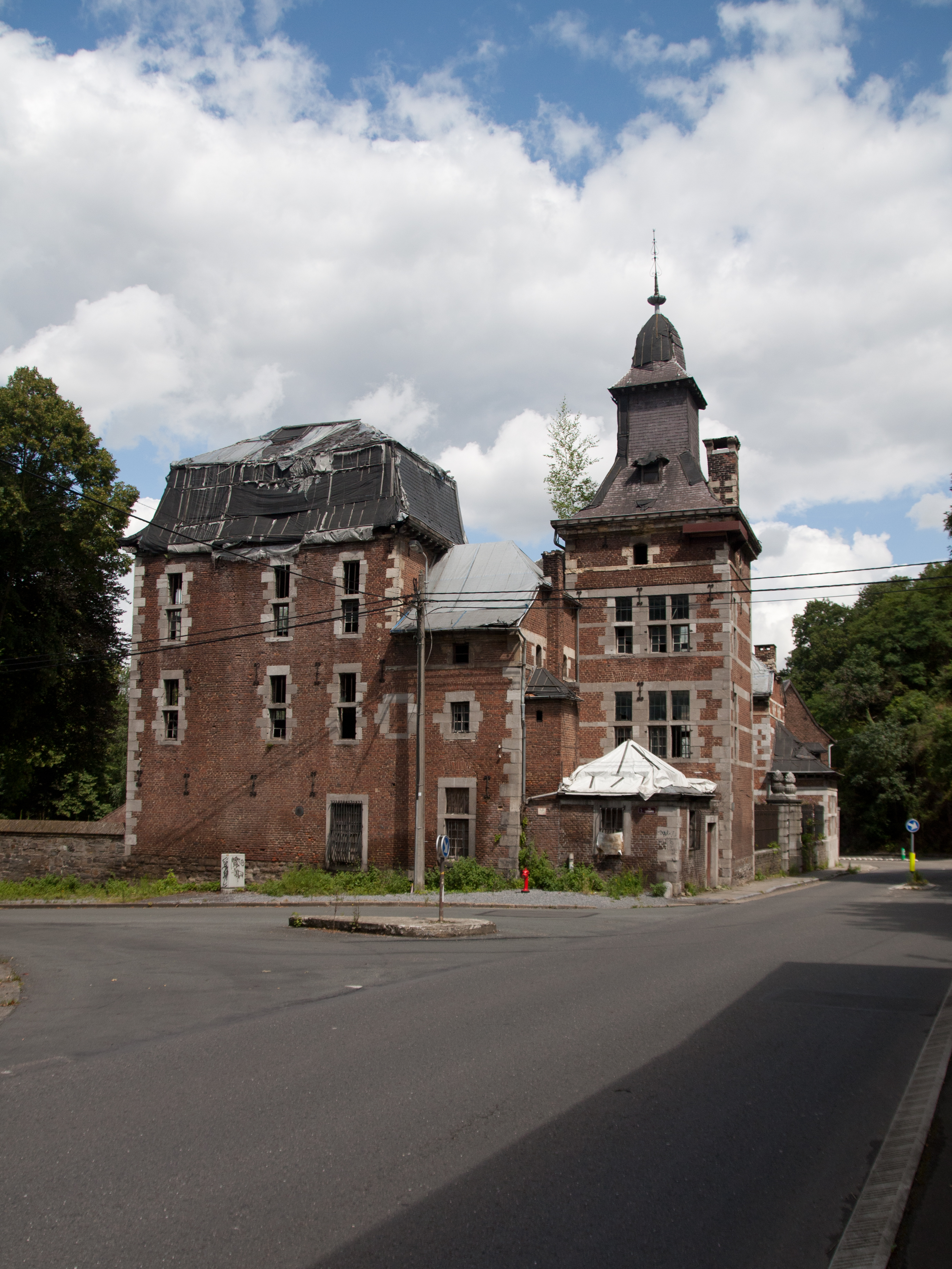
Saroléa castle at Cheratte

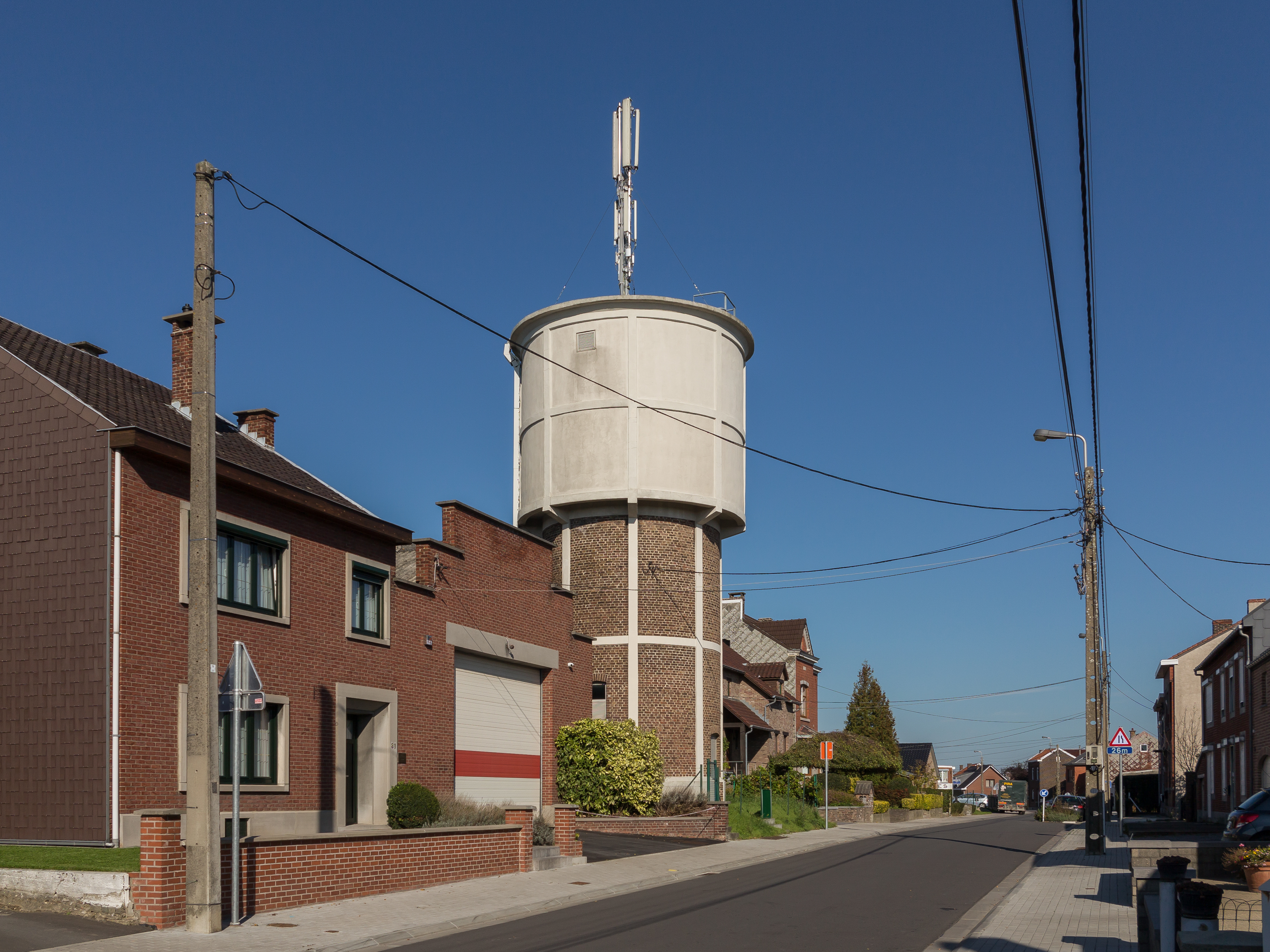
Cheratte-Hauteurs: watertower

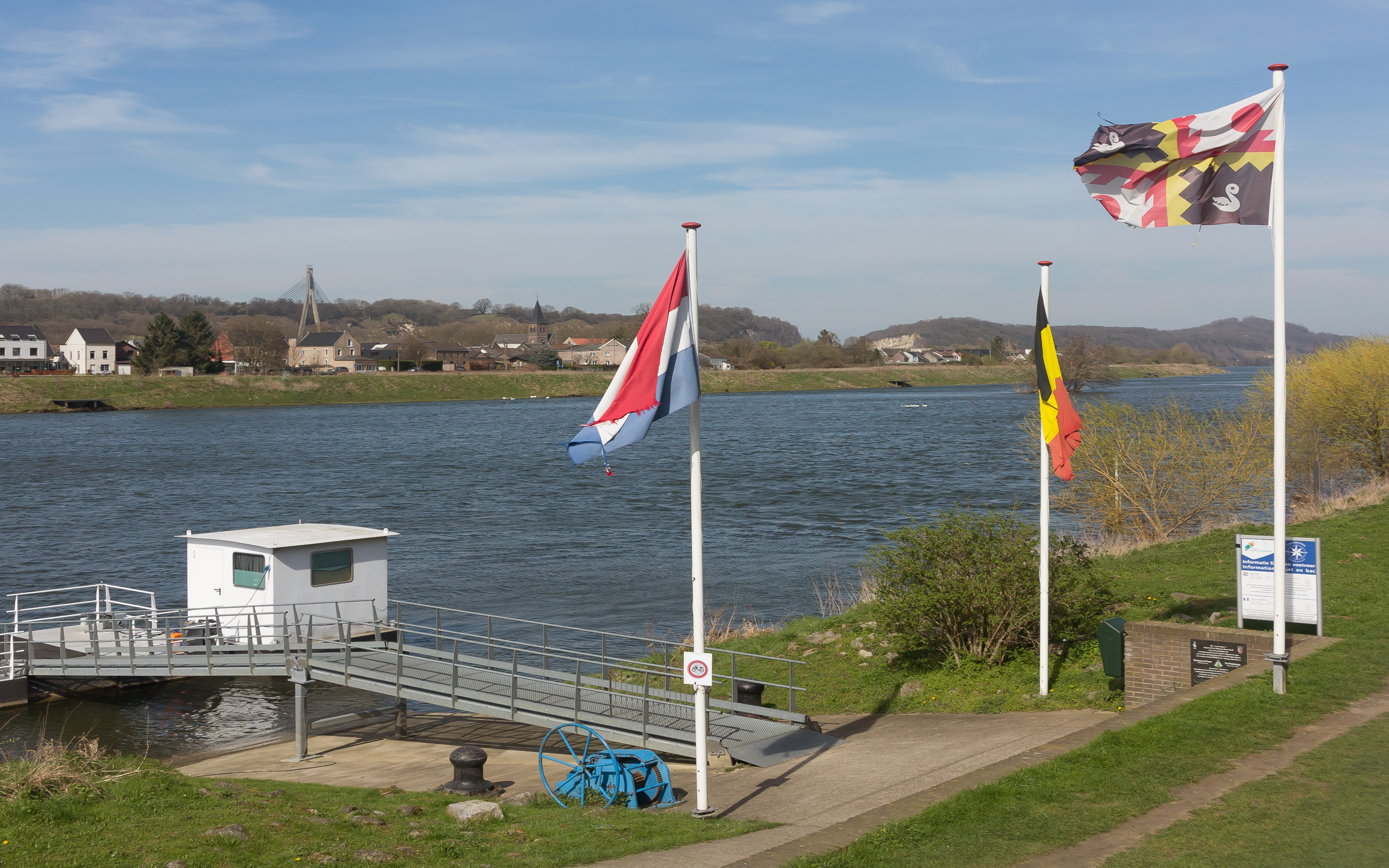
View to the Lanaye from Eijsden

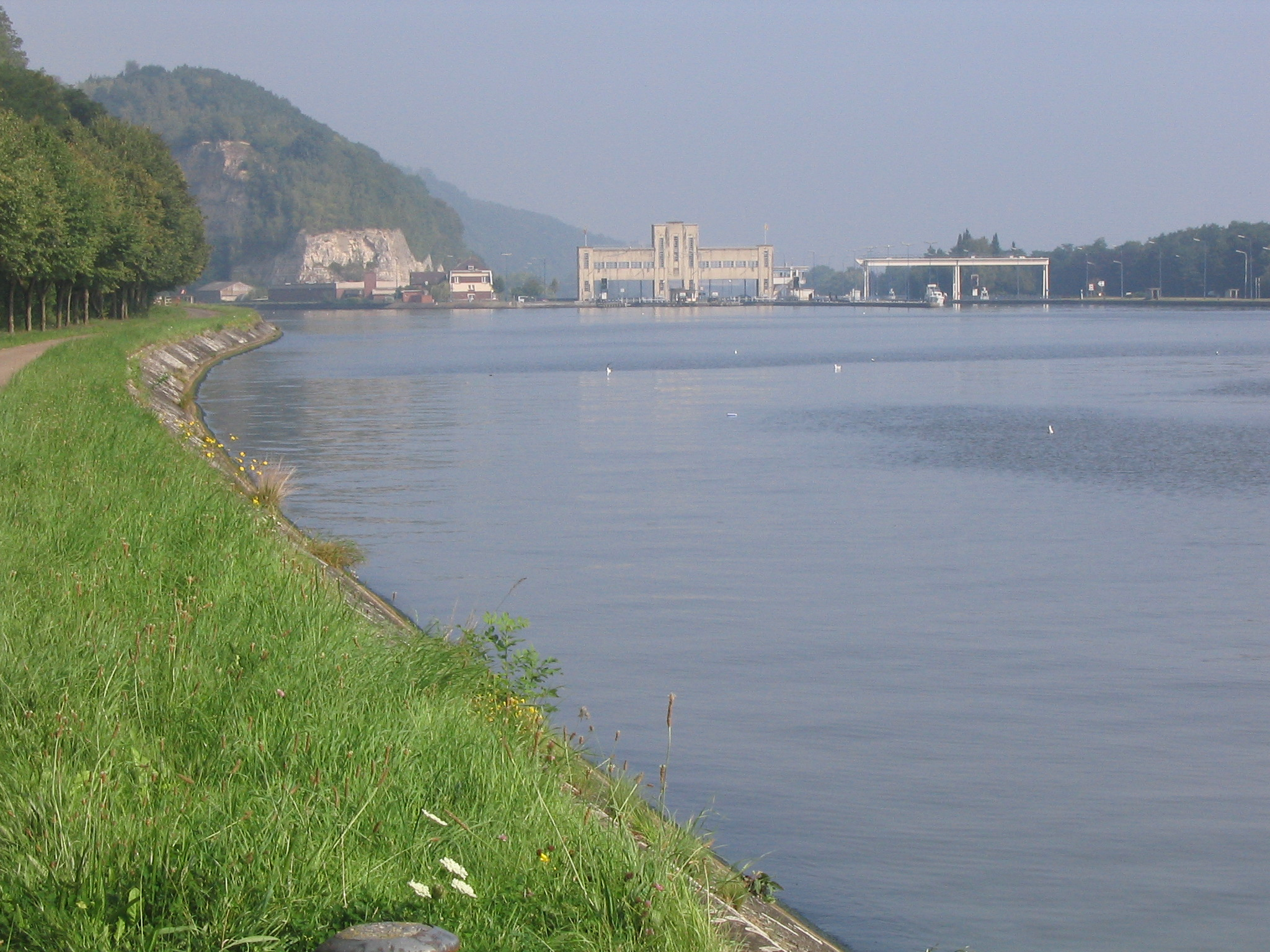
Albert Canal at Lanaye

== See also ==
- List of protected heritage sites in Visé
