= Coal mine of Hasard de Cheratte =

Coordinates: 50°40′51″N 5°40′13″E

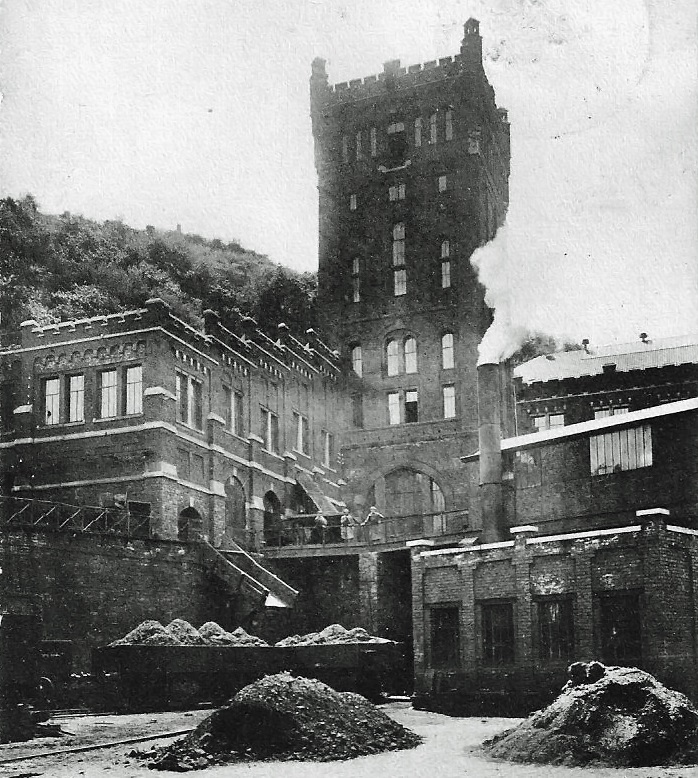
- Coal mine of Hasard de Cheratte in activity

- Location within Belgium
- Location: Visé
- Opened: 1907
- Closed: 1977
- Company: Société anonyme des Charbonnages du Hasard

The Coal mine of Hasard de Cheratte (or Cheratte 10) was the main colliery of the Société anonyme des Charbonnages du Hasard, and had four shafts. It is located in Cheratte, a section of the Belgian town of Visé in Liège province in Wallonia. The first shaft was dug in 1850 to extract dice coal and closed for the first time in 1877 following an accident. It reopened 30 years later in 1907 and operated until 1977. In the early 21st century the mine has gained some notoriety as an urban ruin. Remediation of the site and the demolition of several buildings start in 2017.

== History ==
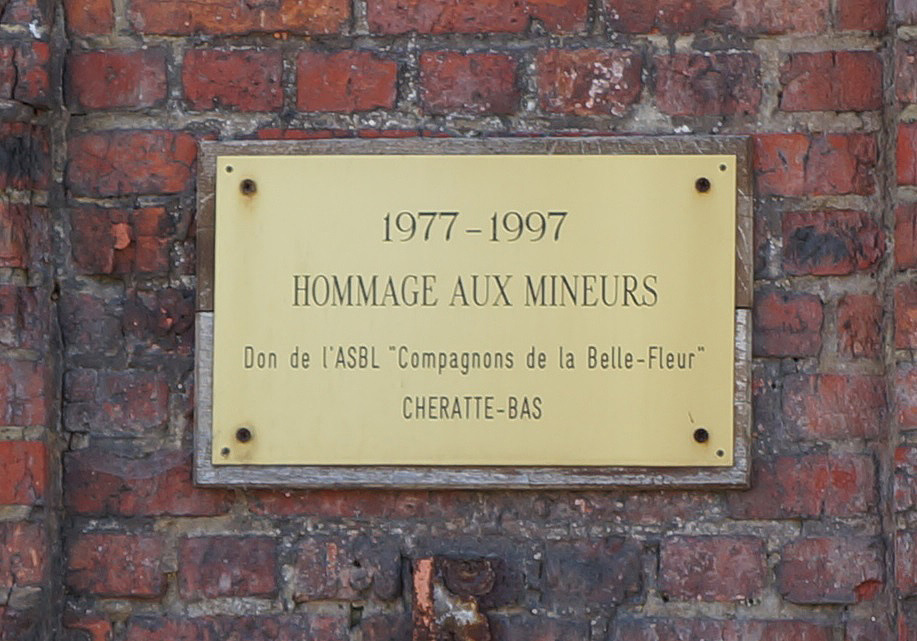
Commemorative plate

This first shaft was dug in 1850 to a depth of 250 metres. After reviewing the mine to know its state, the engineers noticed that the coal was located deep down. The first mine was dug again and reached a depth of 420 metres. The place on which the mine is located is not very big. The extraction company decided to build a headframe, a first in Belgium. This tower was fitted with an extraction machine and several motors working with direct current. A washhouse was built in 1920 by Beer de Jemeppe company, and a second extraction mine with a metal tower opened. In 1927, the Belle-Fleur mine was equipped by a little tower made of reinforced concrete and a low power winch. Its work was to bring the tailings back to the surface.

A third mine and a headframe were built between 1927 and 1947. In 1938, the mine reached 313 metres in depth, but it only became operational in 1953. It was improved and reached 480 metres depth. The extraction machine at its top was insufficient. The engineer decided to install a machine on the floor, and to improve it. The n° 1 mine stopped the extraction and became a rescue mine. Then, its additional buildings were converted into showers and cloakrooms. The n° 2 mine was sealed off. In the 1930s, the site reached its apogee, employing 1,500 workers. When it closed on 31 October 1977, it employed more than 600 miners.

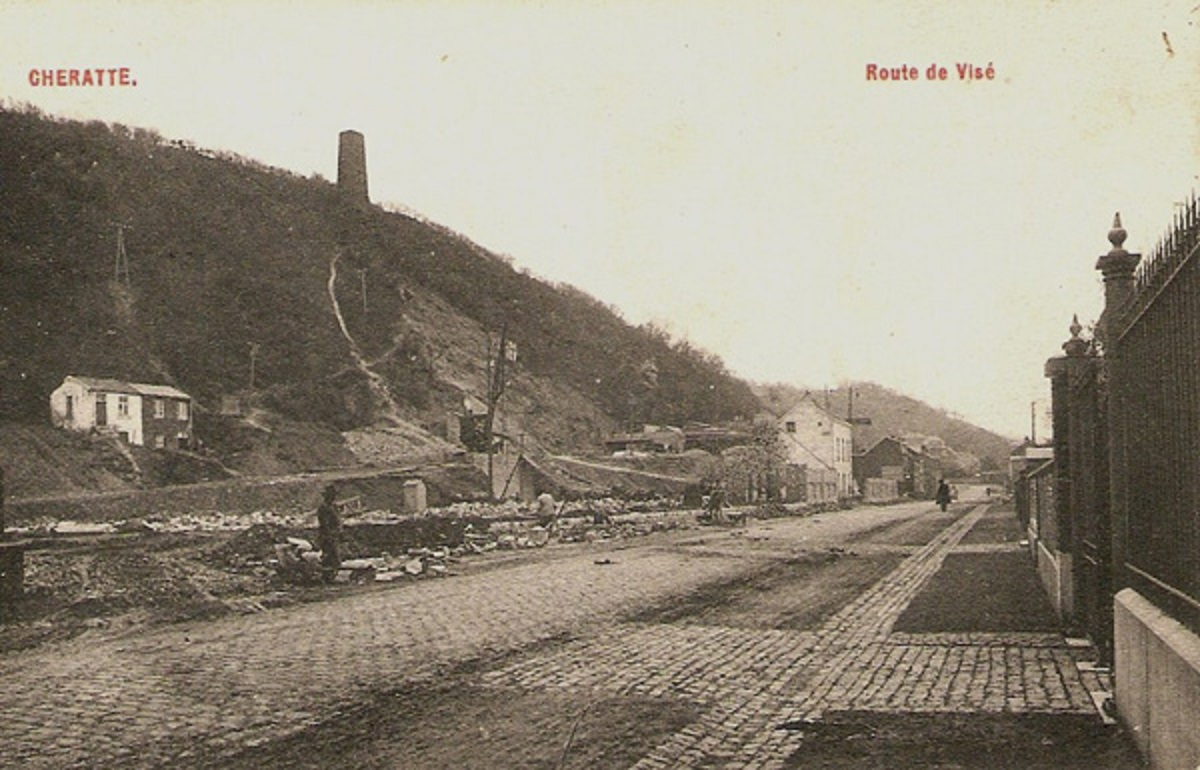
The old buildings, demolished in 1905

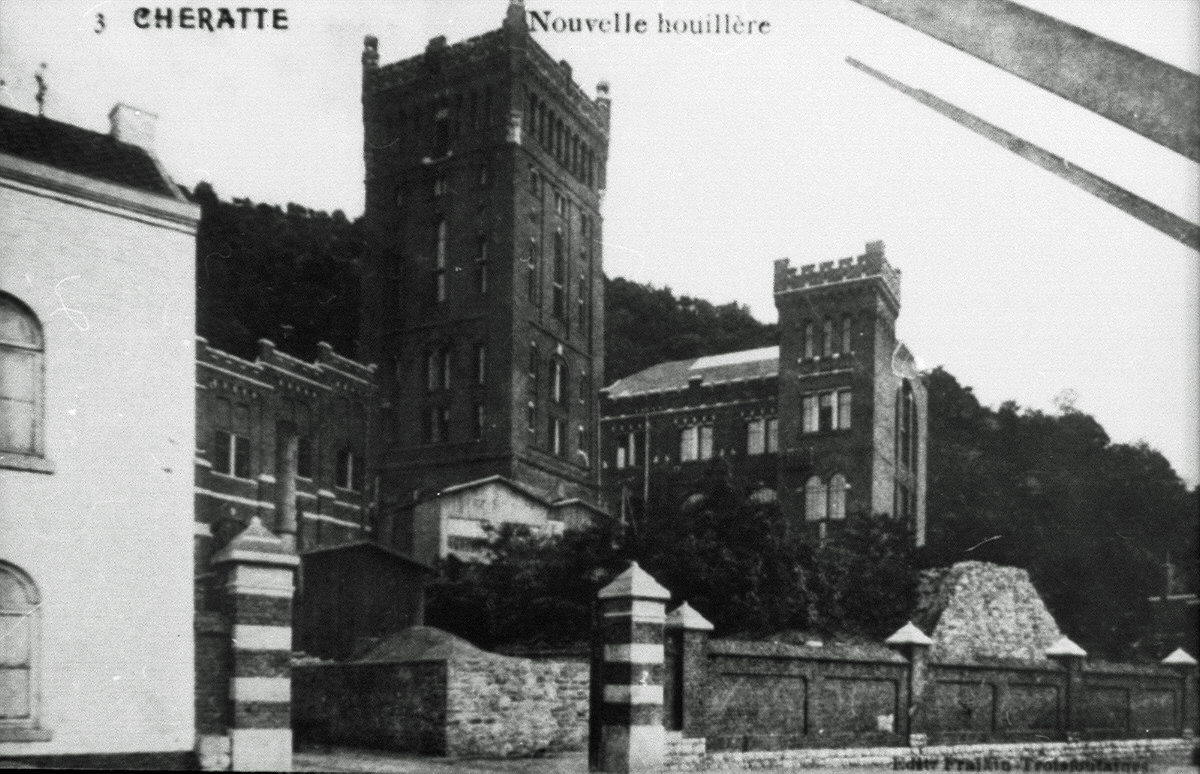
The mine n° 1, just after its rebuilding

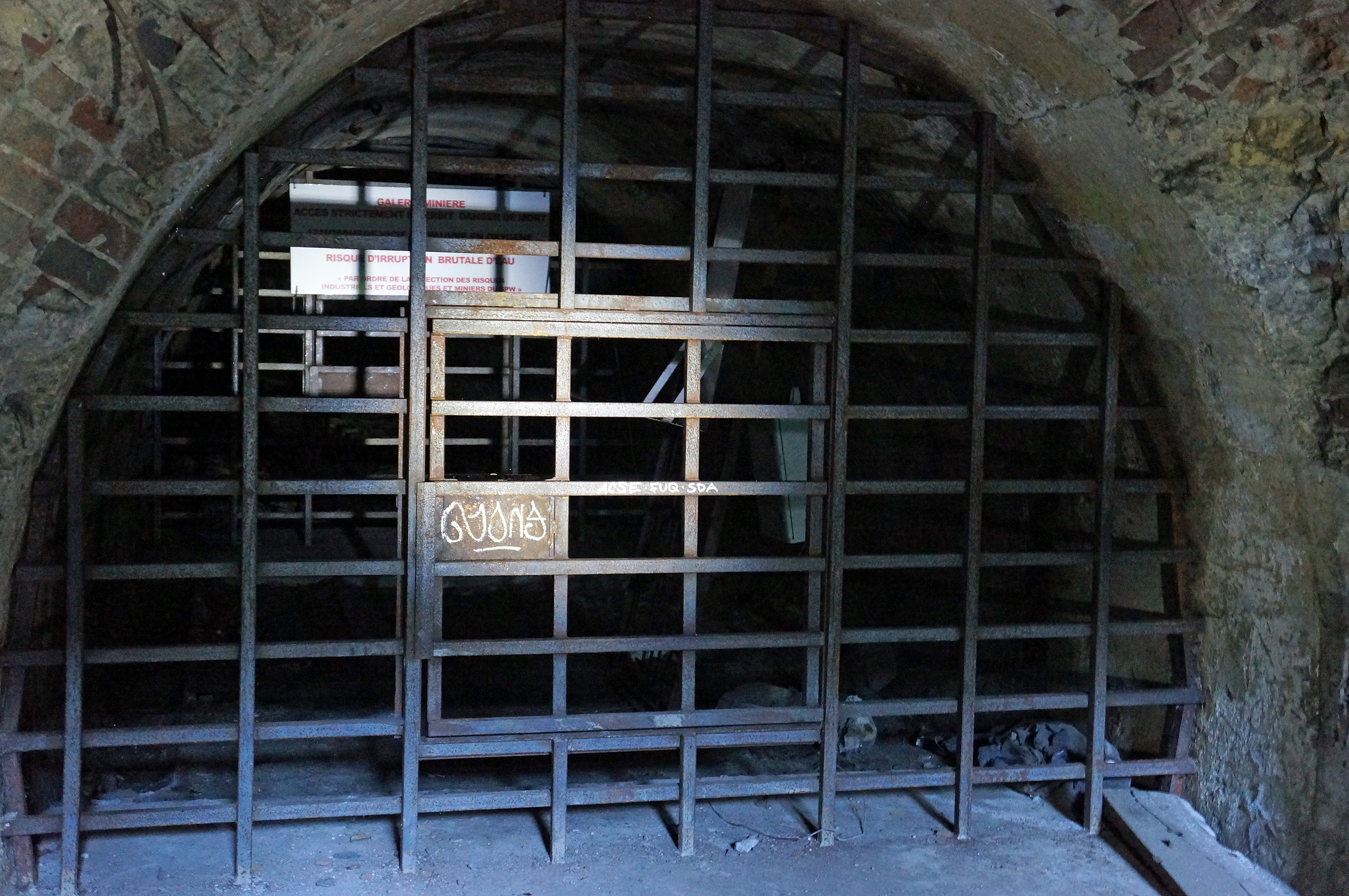
The safe entry of a gallery next to the mine n° 1.

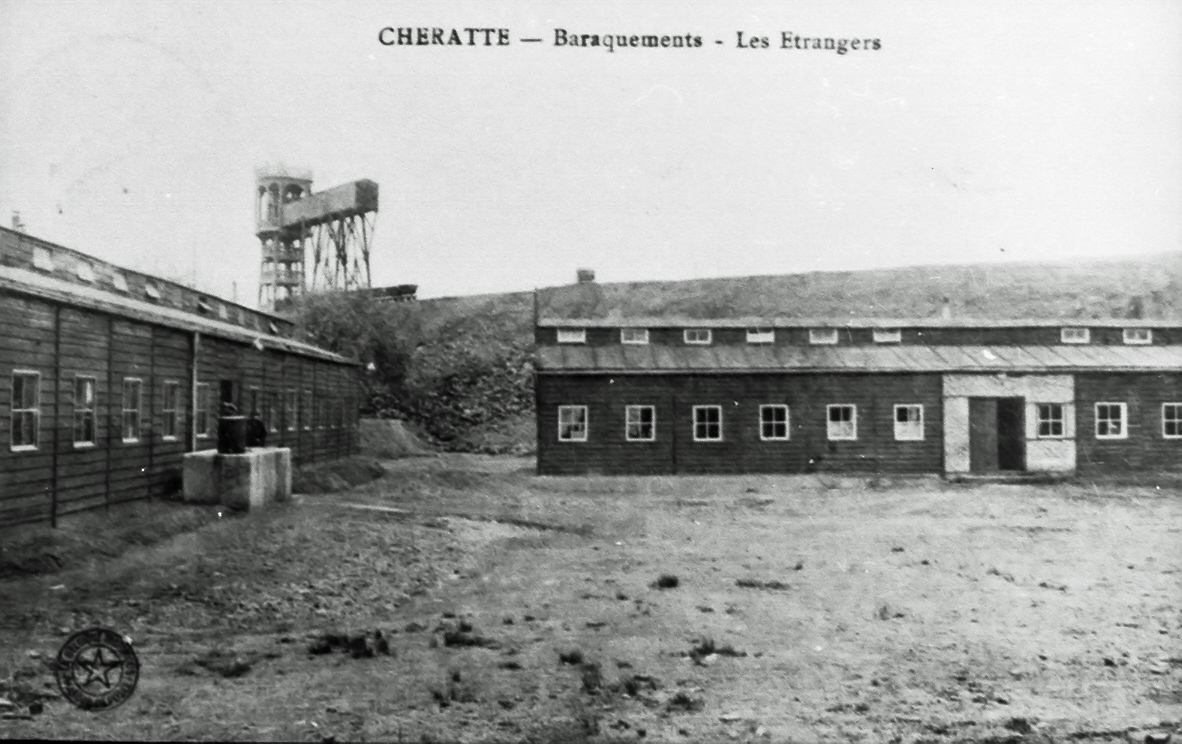
The tower of Belle-Fleur mine, the spoil tip and the house buildings.

== Architecture ==
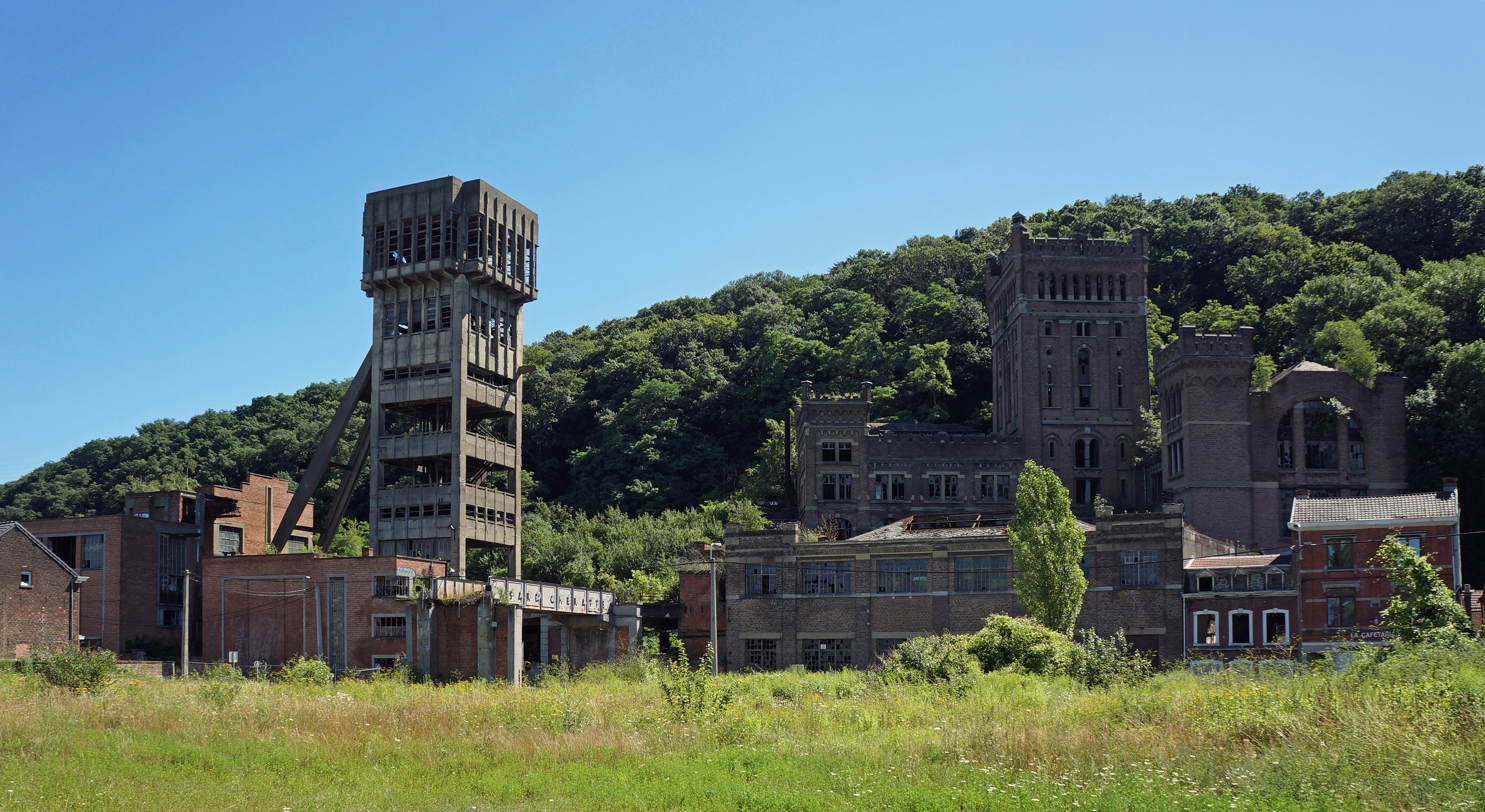
View of varied architectures of the site.

The coal shafts have varied industrial architectural designs, despite being constructed around the same time. The towers and the additional buildings of mine n° 1 were built with medieval architecture, whereas mine number two had a metal tower. The tower of mine n° 3 is the tallest of the site, and is built with reinforced concrete. It was originally built to host a machine at its top, but this machine was eventually built on the ground. The tower of Belle-Fleur mine was built on the same principle but is taller and has more typical architecture for the 1920s.

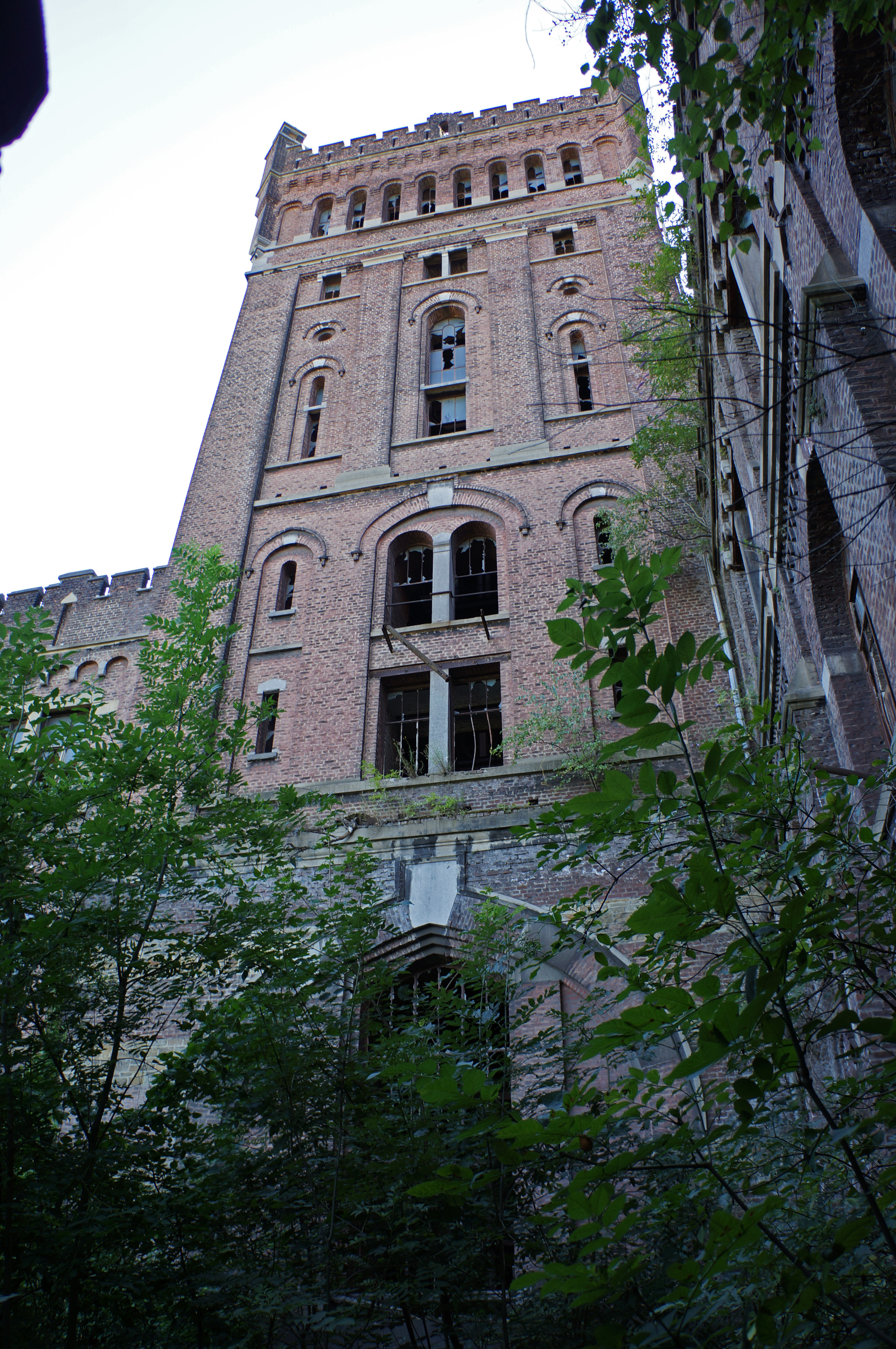
The tower of shaft No. 1.

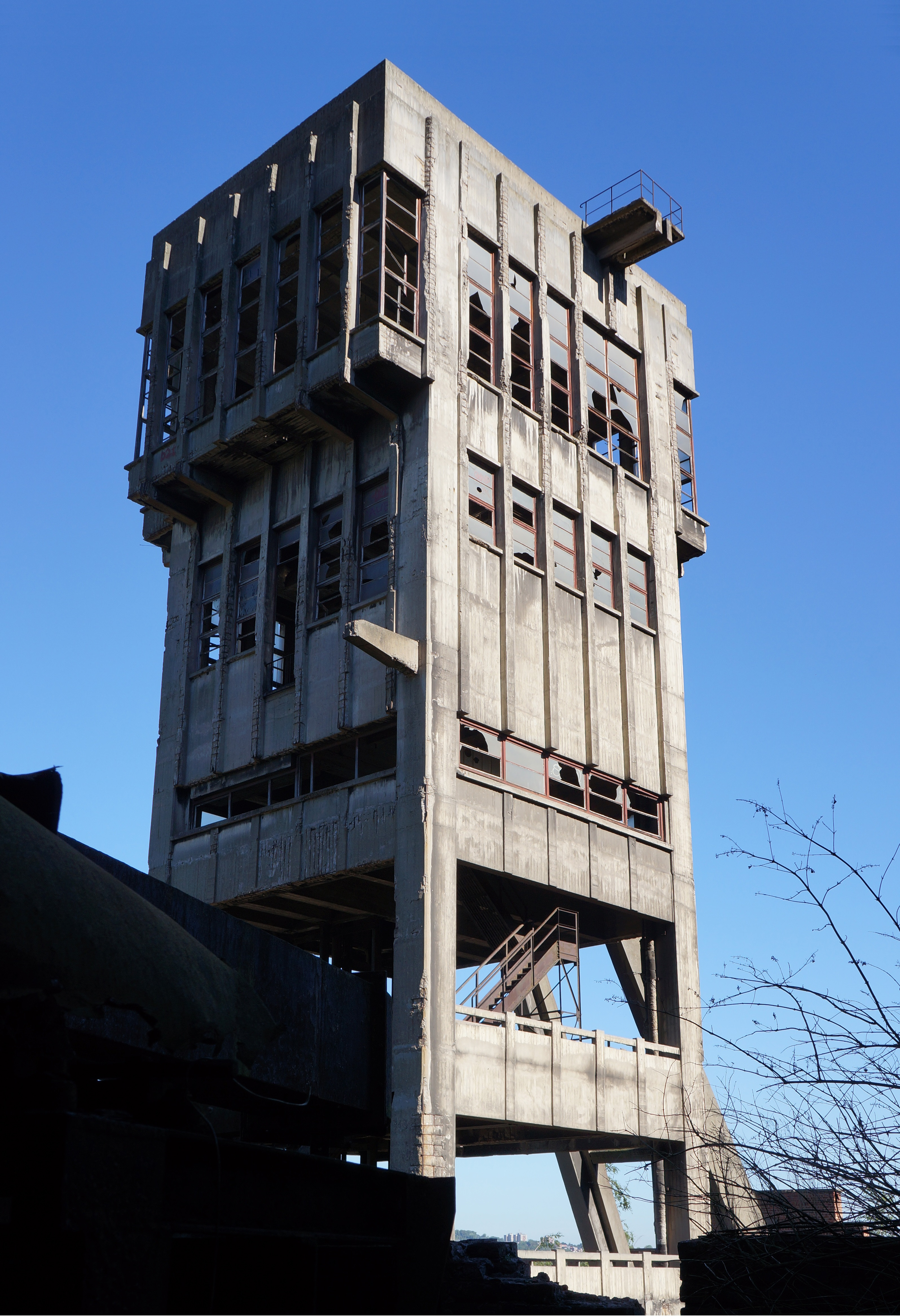
The tower of shaft No. 3.

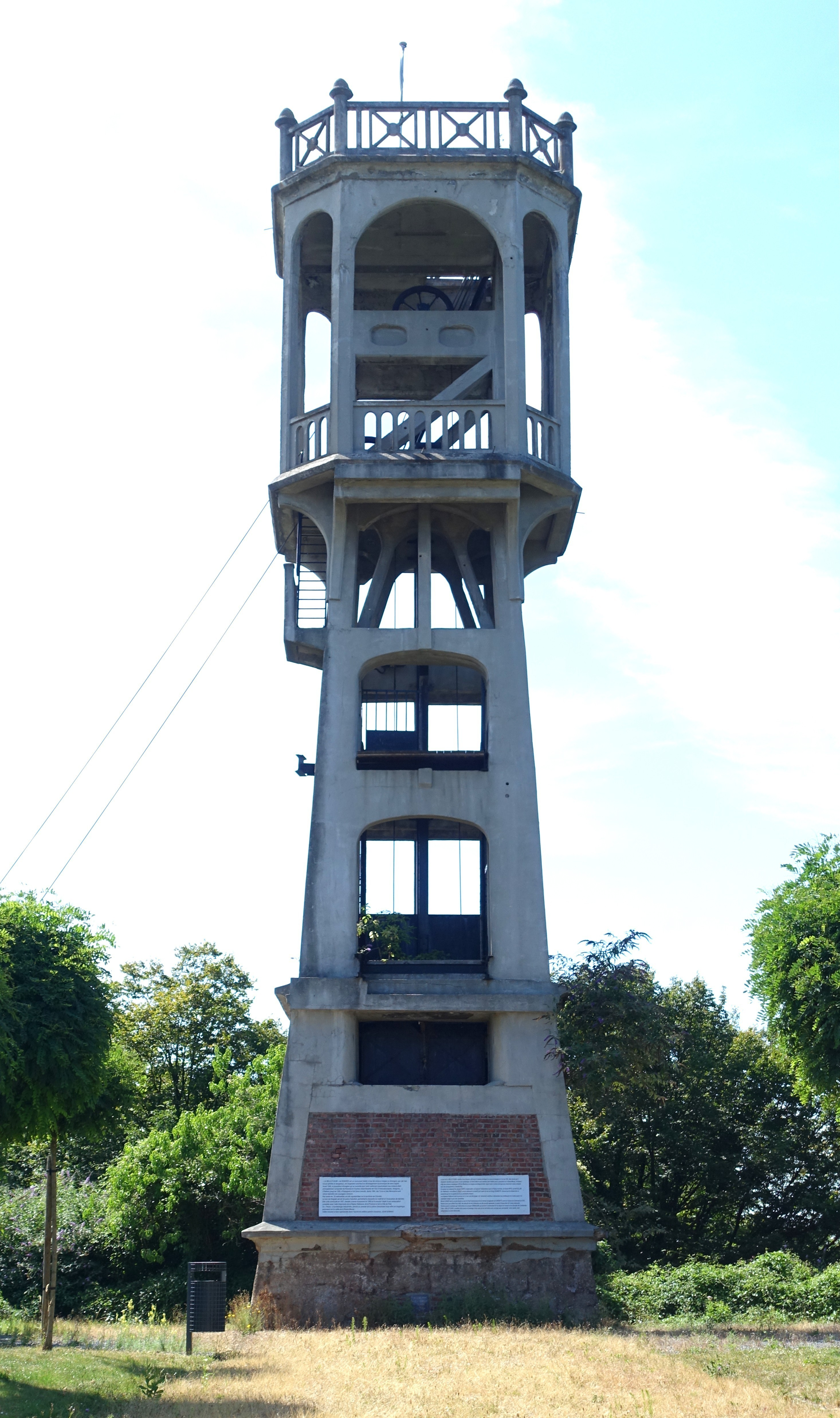
The tower of shaft 4 Belle-Fleur.

== Conversion ==
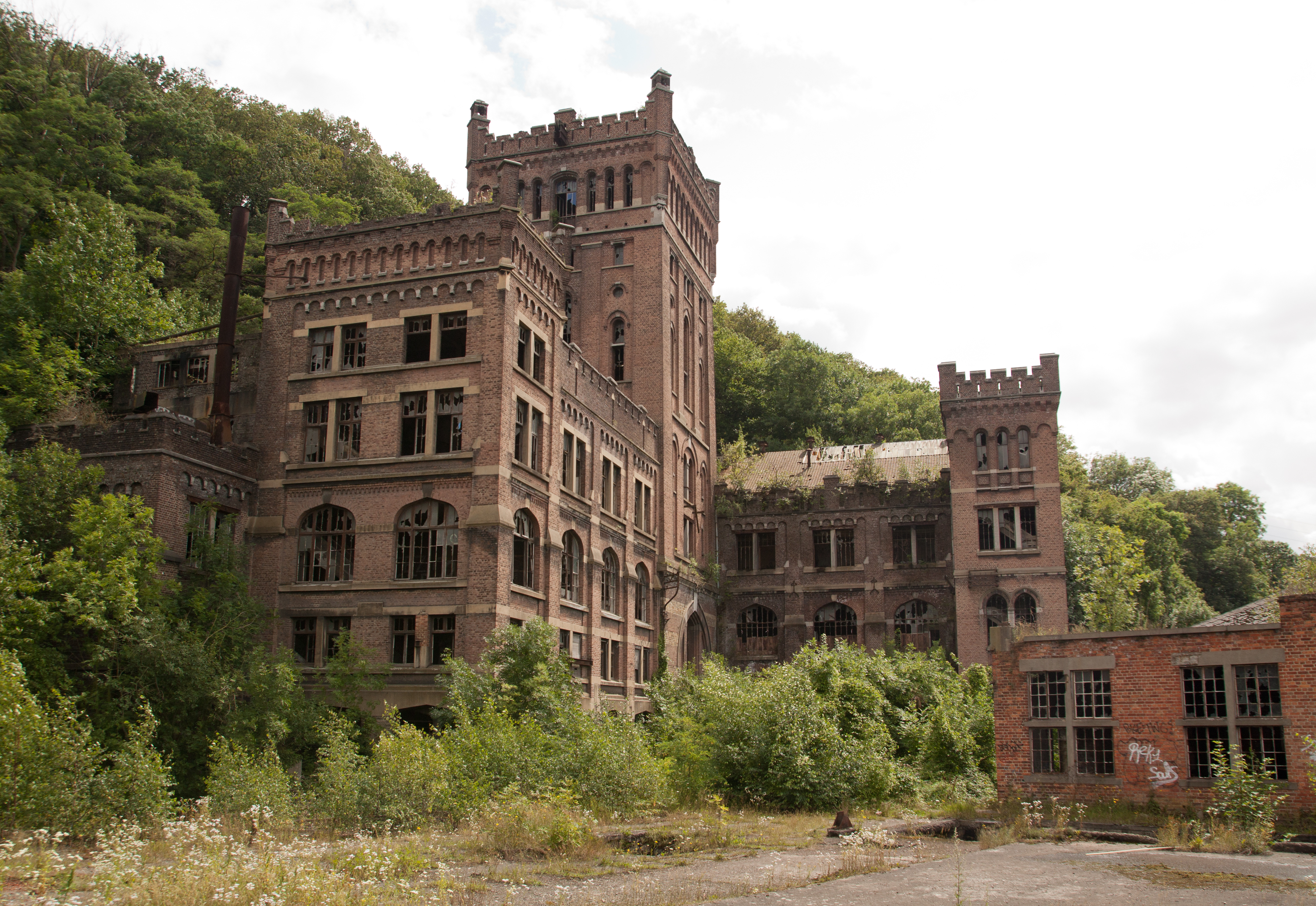
The tower of shaft No. 1, in 2012

After its closure, the site was purchased cheaply by Mr Armand Lowie, a flemish real estate developer, who decided to dismantle it. However, decrees were published to protect the site in 1978, 1982 and 1992. In 1997, the Belle-Fleur tower underwent solidity control and is equipped again.

In the early 21st century, the ruins have become known for the practice of urbex.

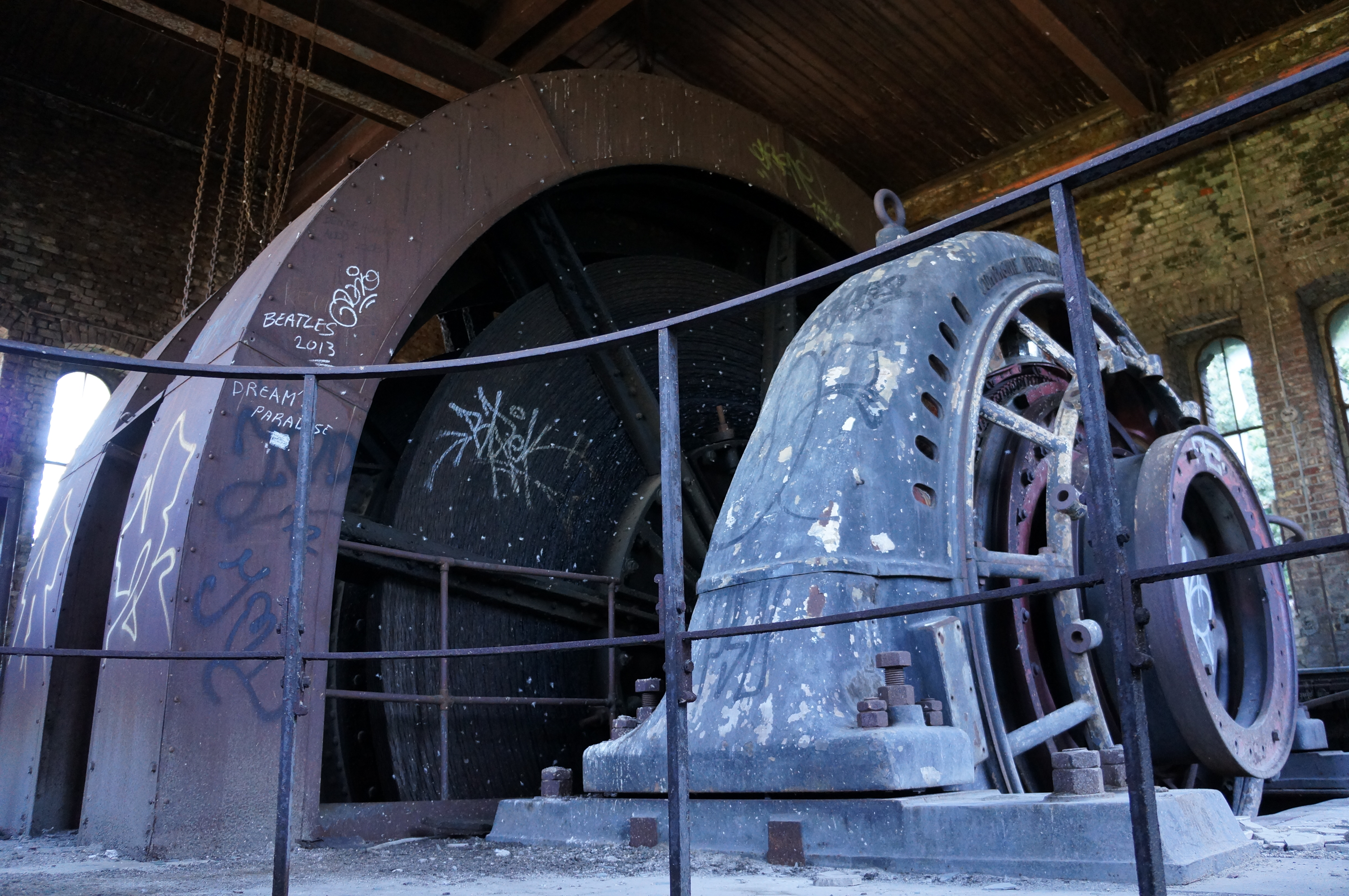
The extraction machine of shaft No. 1.

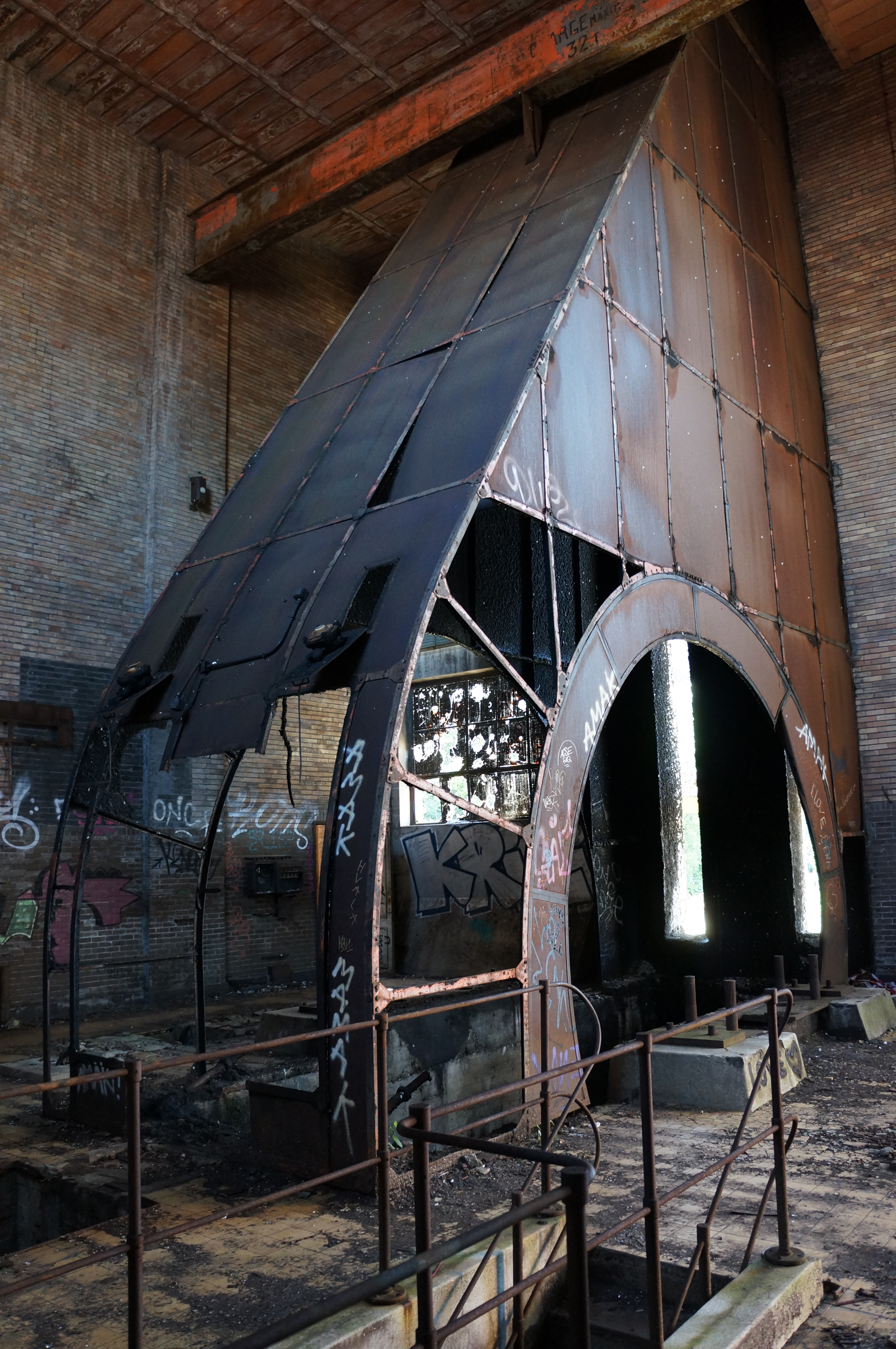
The extraction machine of shaft No. 3.

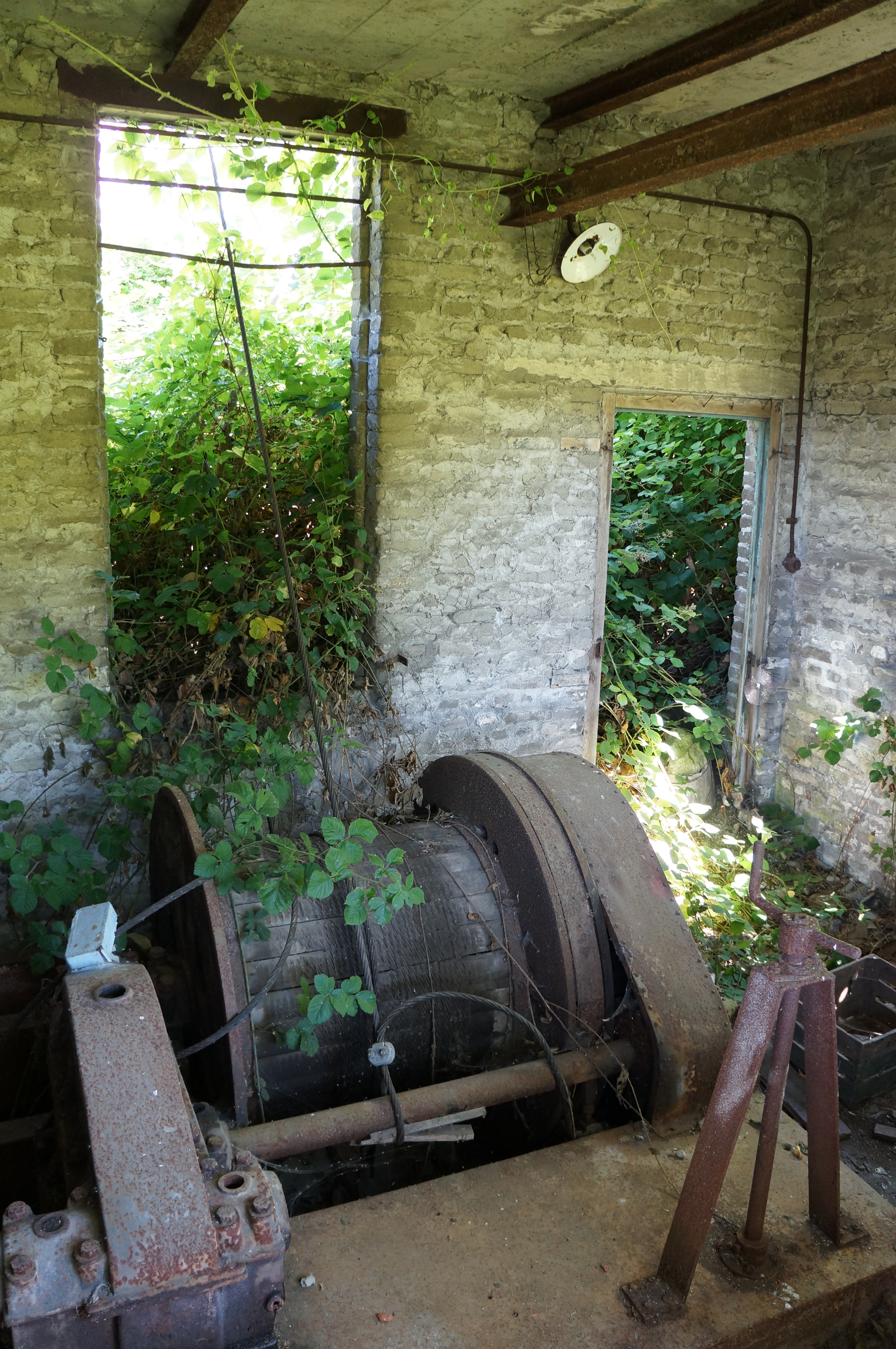
The extraction machine of shaft Belle-Fleur.

In 2007, the Hasard mine was included in a Walloon Government rehabilitation programme to restore the facades and roofs of the Phalanstère, as well as the machine room and the wooded hill. The tower of mine n° 1 has been classified as a local heritage site since 1980.

At the end of 2008, Mr Lowie filed a building permit for the demolition of the concrete tower of shaft no. 3 and ancillary buildings to replace them with housing and shops, but opposition was strong and the project was suspended. On 30 April 2013, after more than 30 years of controversy between the owners and the authorities, a notice of expropriation was recorded by the Minister Philip Henry and the site became public. The SPI is responsible for cleaning up the site with a budget 2,070,000 euro. A conversion plan was being prepared for the end of 2013, and unclassified parts of buildings would be demolished in October 2015. The site would then offer services to individuals and businesses.

== Ruins ==
In 2016, the installations of shafts no. 1 and 3 were in ruins, and the buildings of shaft no. 1 were classified as local heritage sites. The n° 2 shaft was destroyed, as well as several buildings around it. The no. 4 mine was well-preserved.

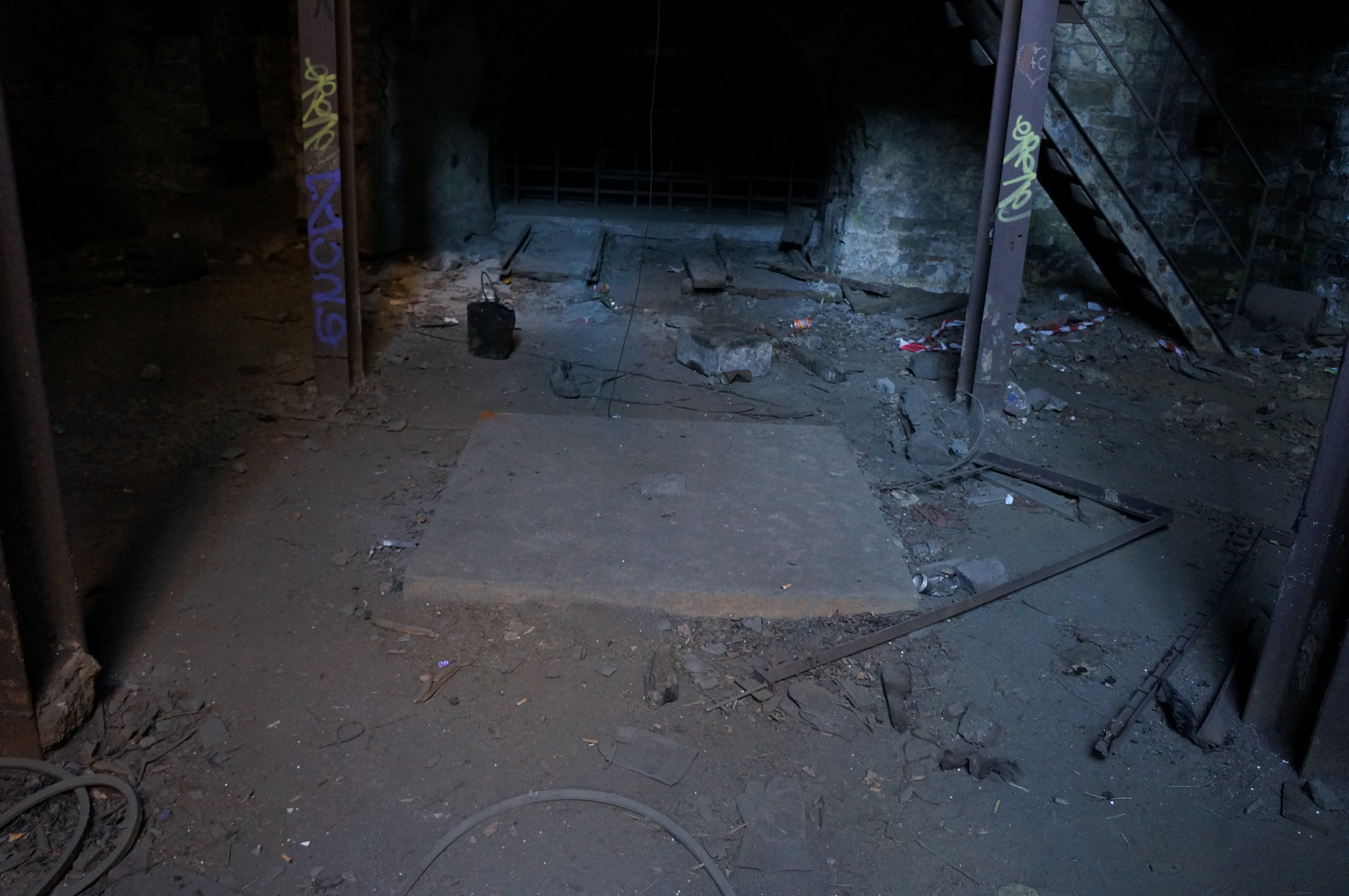
Concrete slab of shaft No. 1.

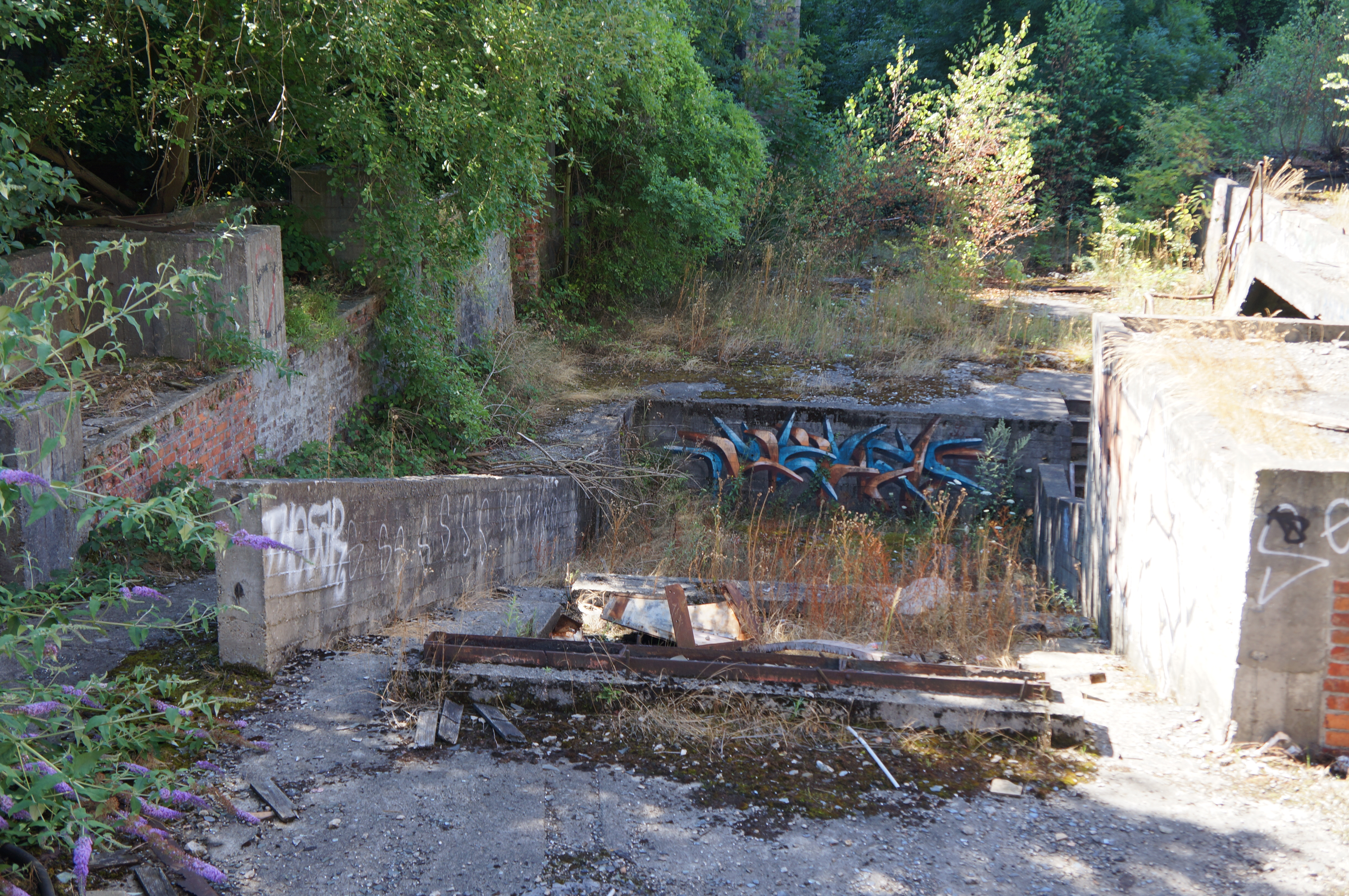
The remnants of the shaft No. 2 and his coal handling building.

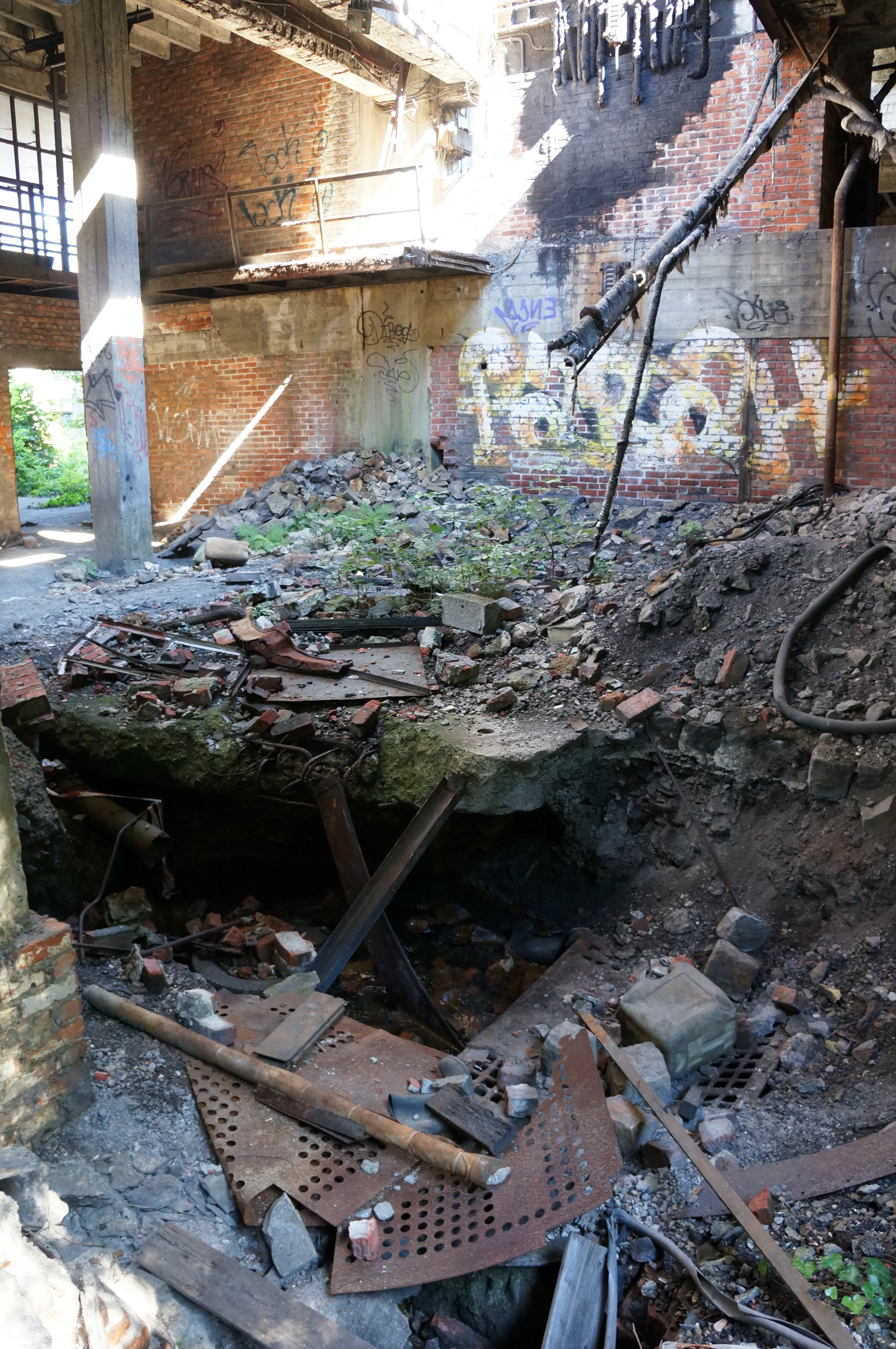
Concrete slab of shaft No. 3.

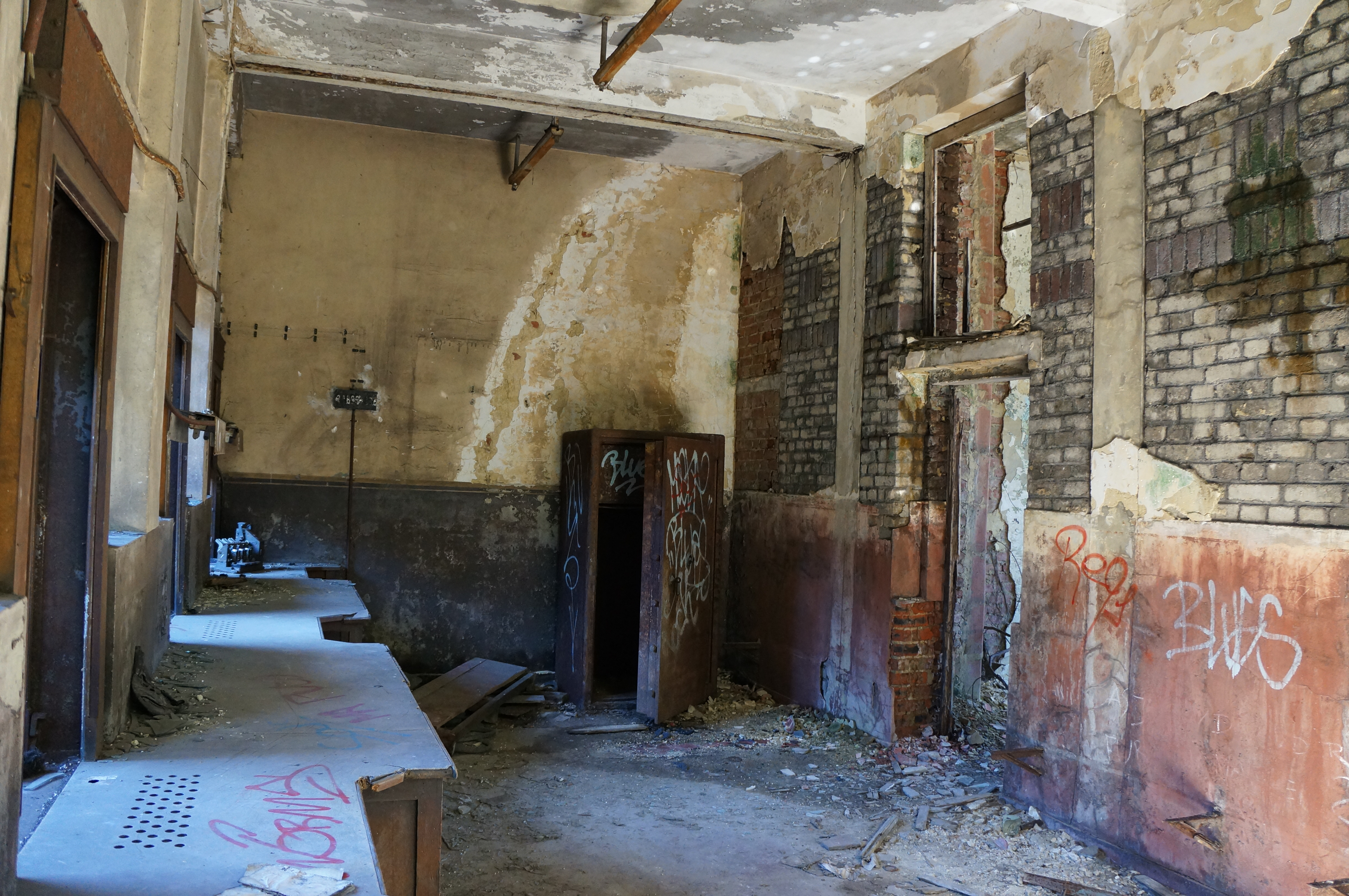
The payment counter.

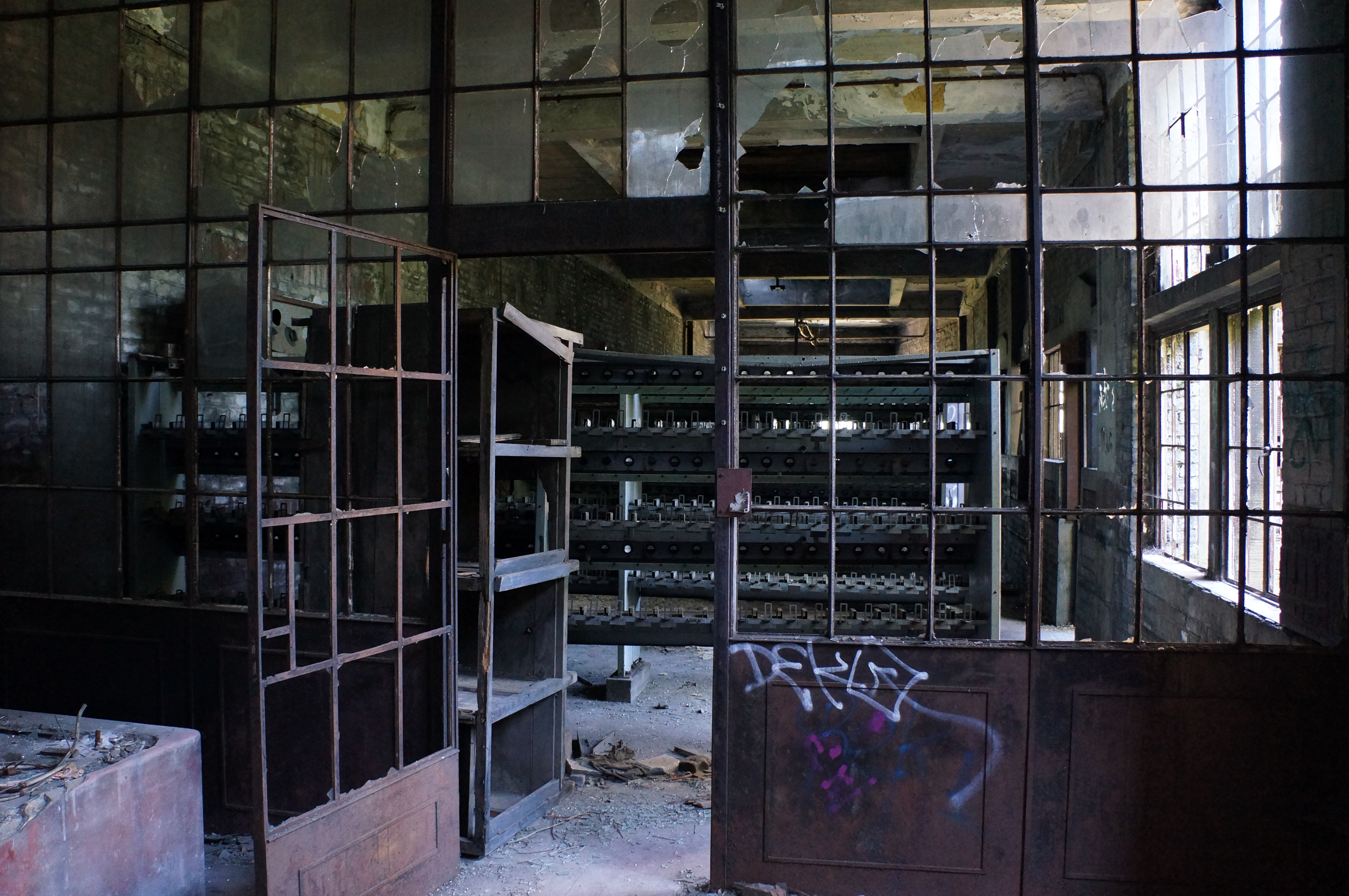
The lamp room.

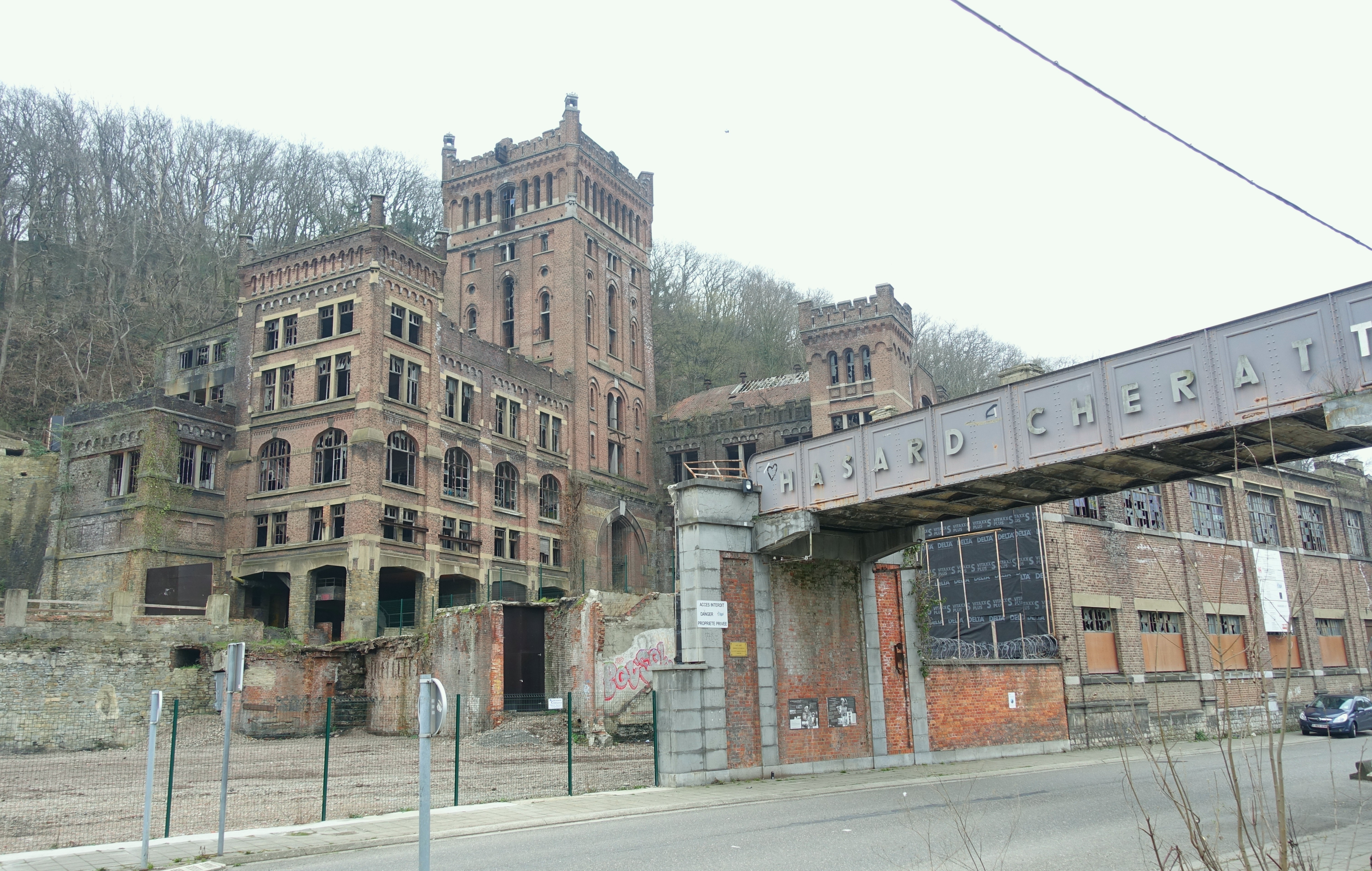
Situation in 2019

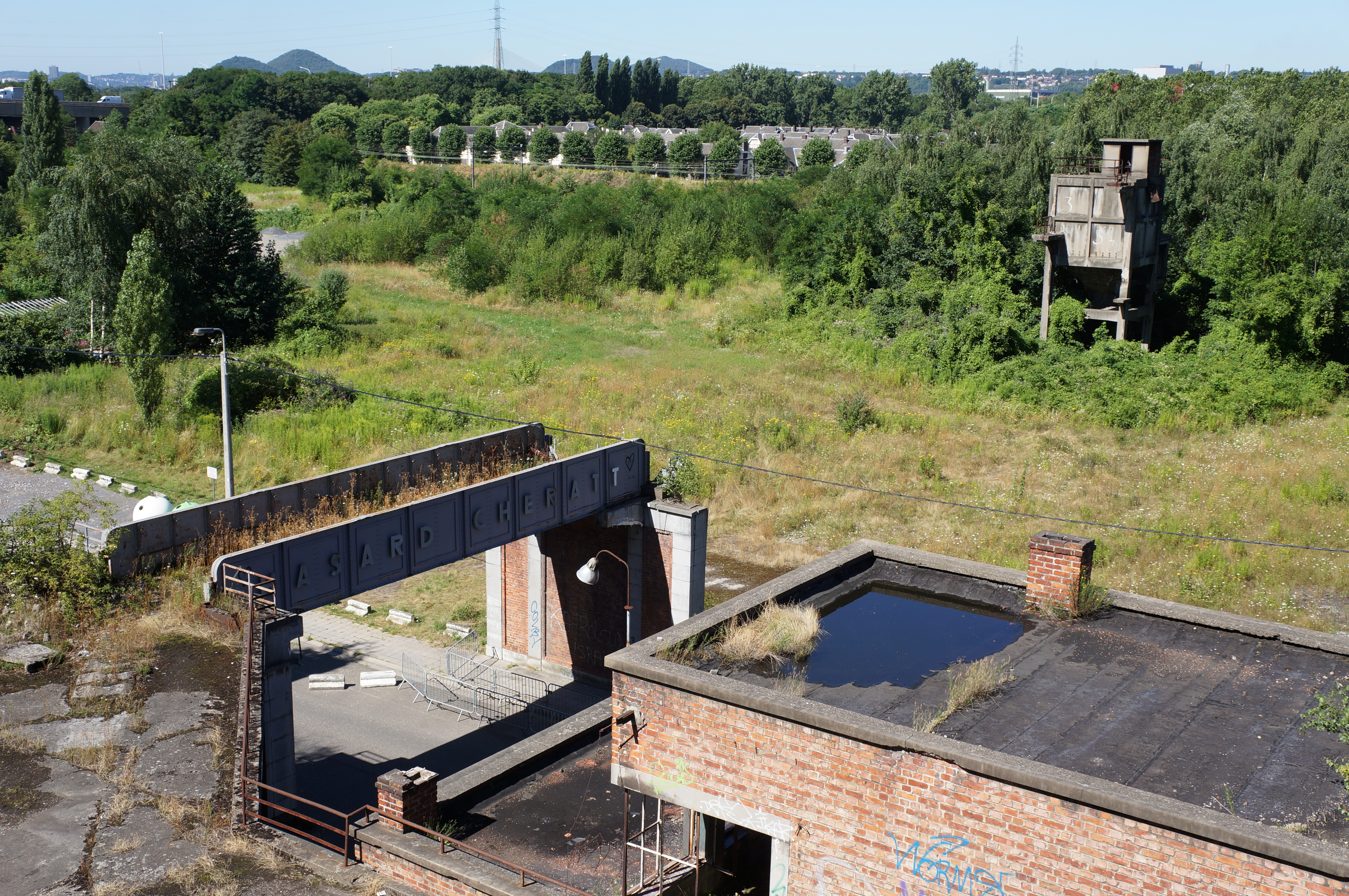
The remnants of the coal washery and the company town.

== Company town ==
The Cheratte company town was built in 1925 and composed of 200 houses without a geometric plan, each consisting of six rooms. Each house had a sewer, tap water, electricity, and a garden. There was a hotel for single people in the town. It had 128 bedrooms and cost 1 Belgian franc per day. There was also a castle, which housed a medical room and the director's residence.

On the closure of the mine, the company town was purchased and restored by a regional social housing company.

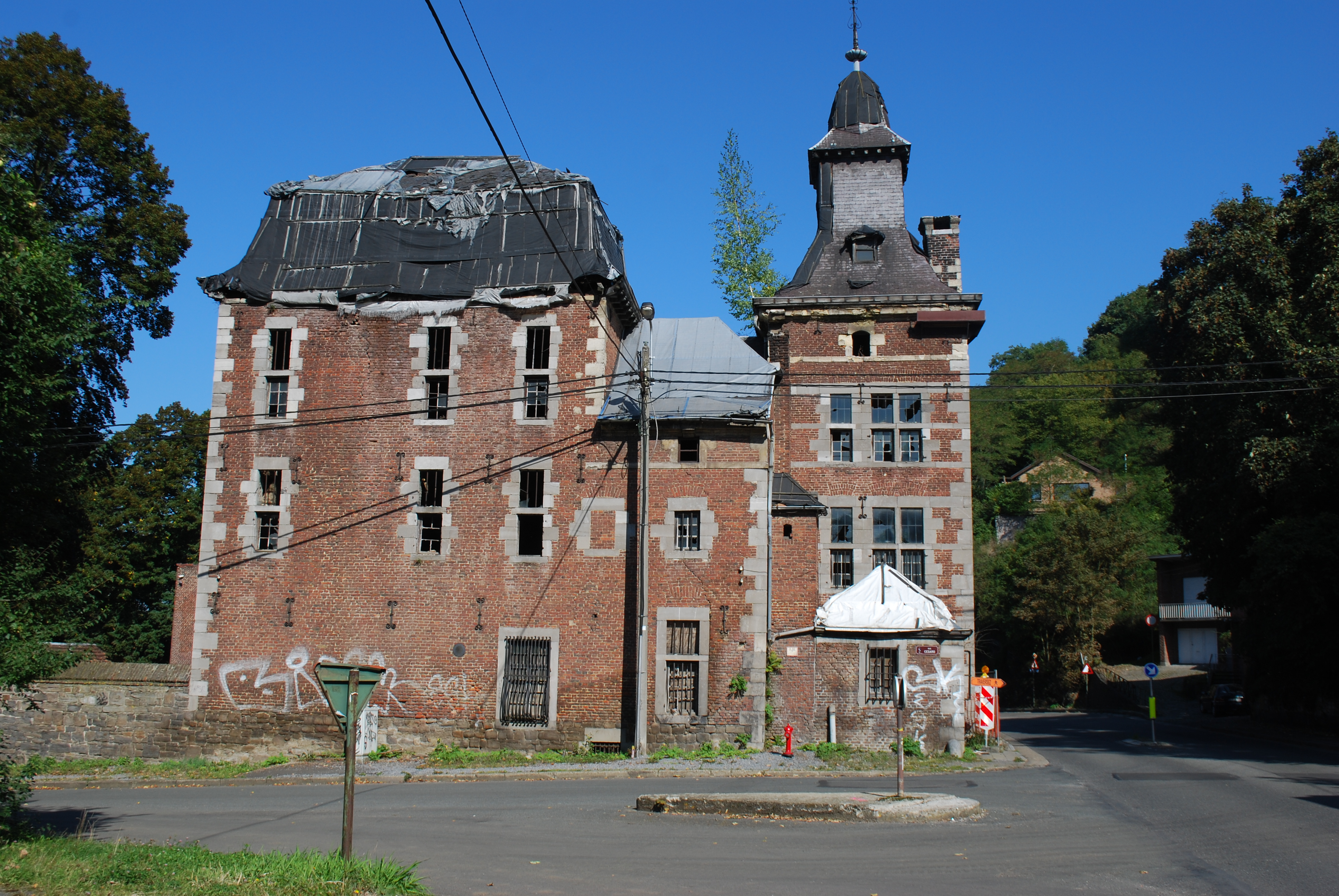
The castle.

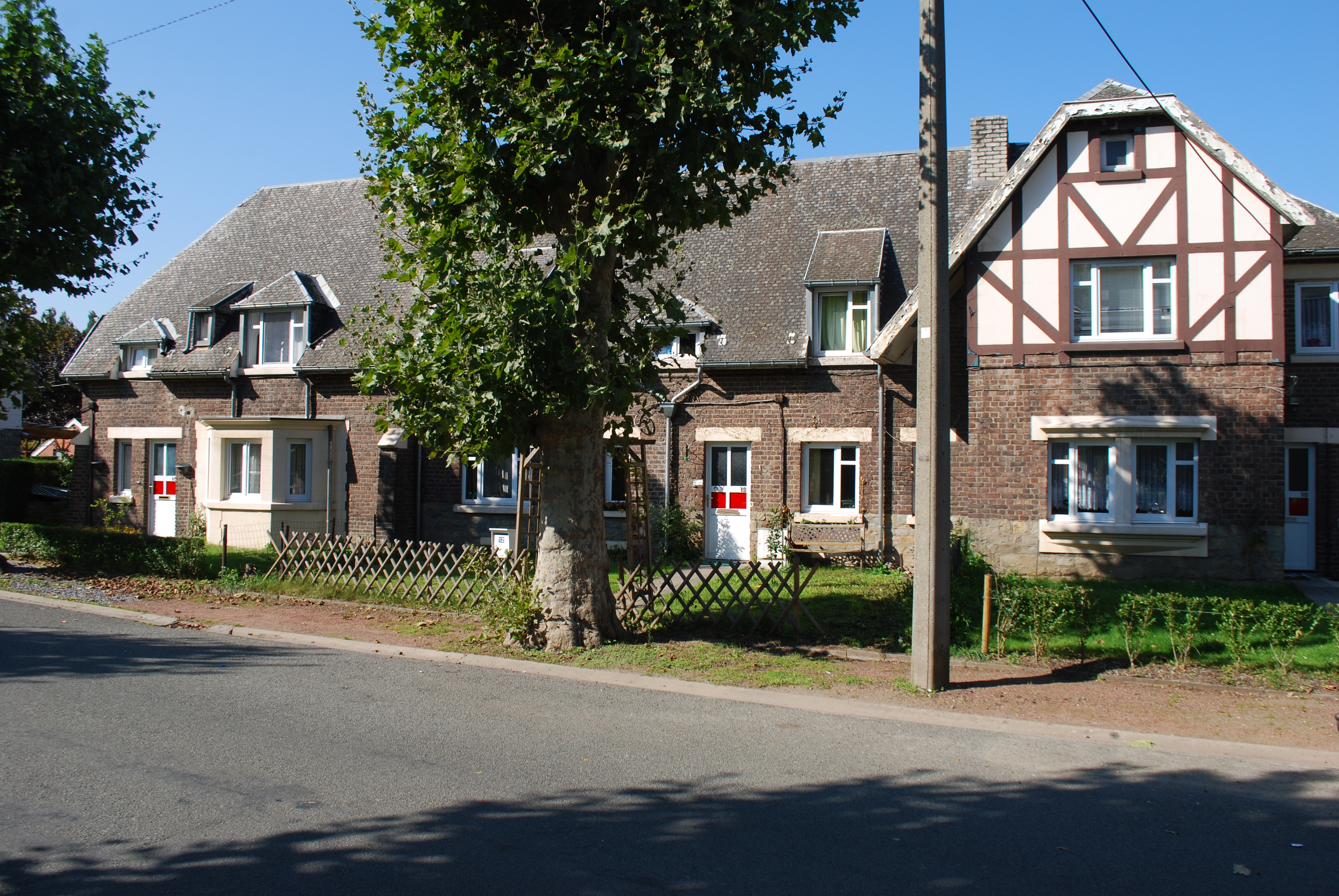
The company town.

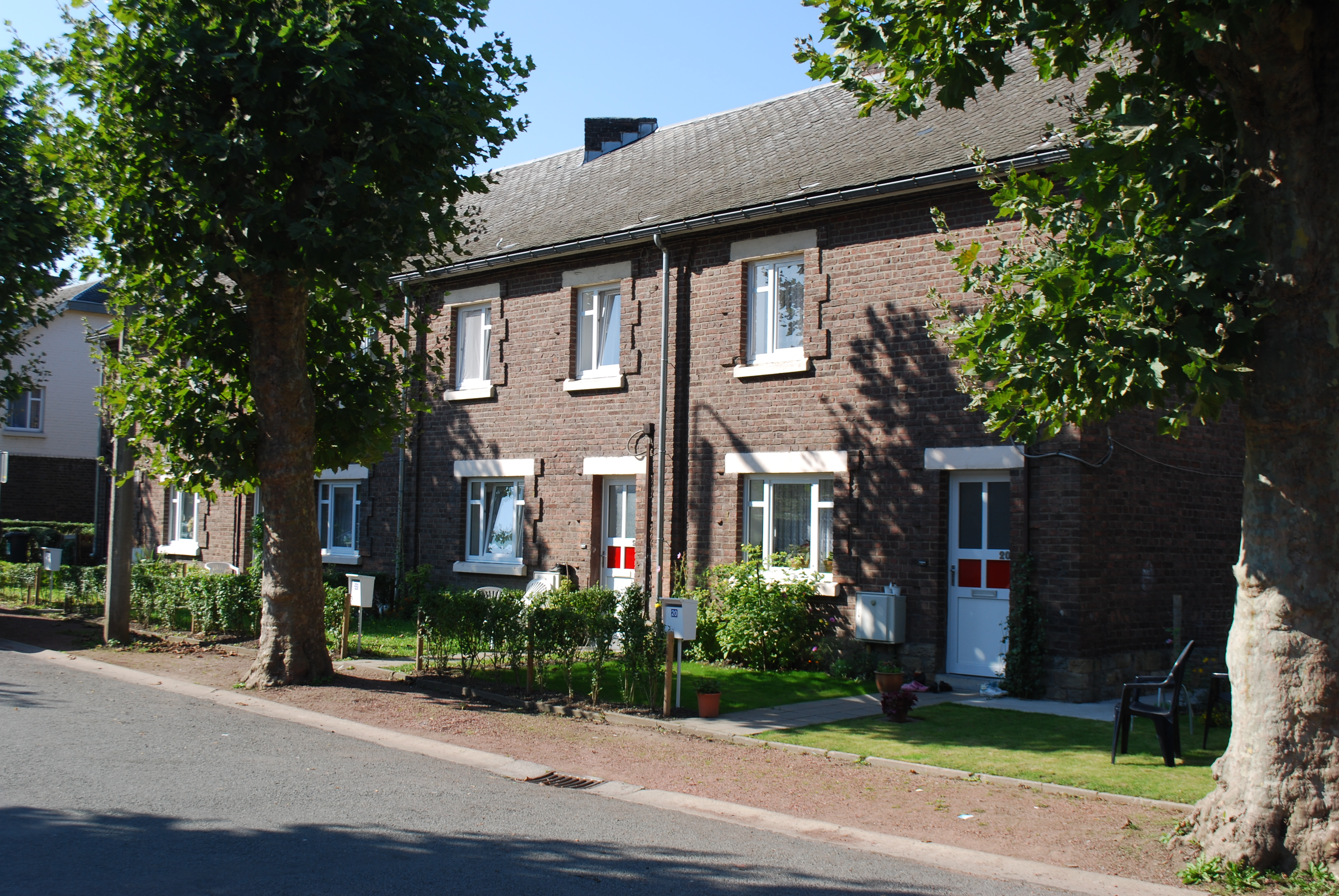
The company town.

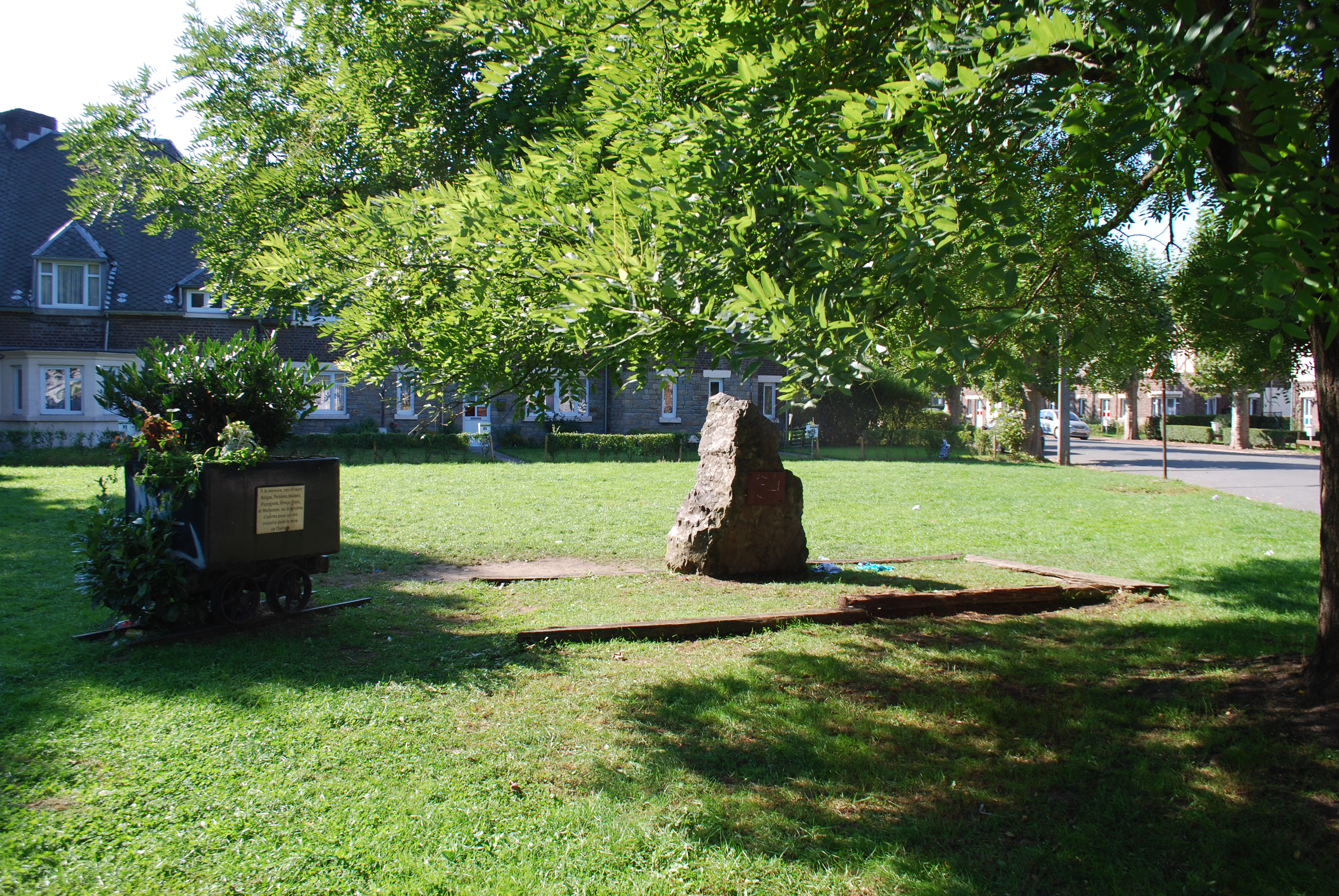
Memorials.
