= Princess Amalie of Nassau-Dietz =

Amalia of Nassau-Dietz
- Hereditary Princess of Baden-Durlach
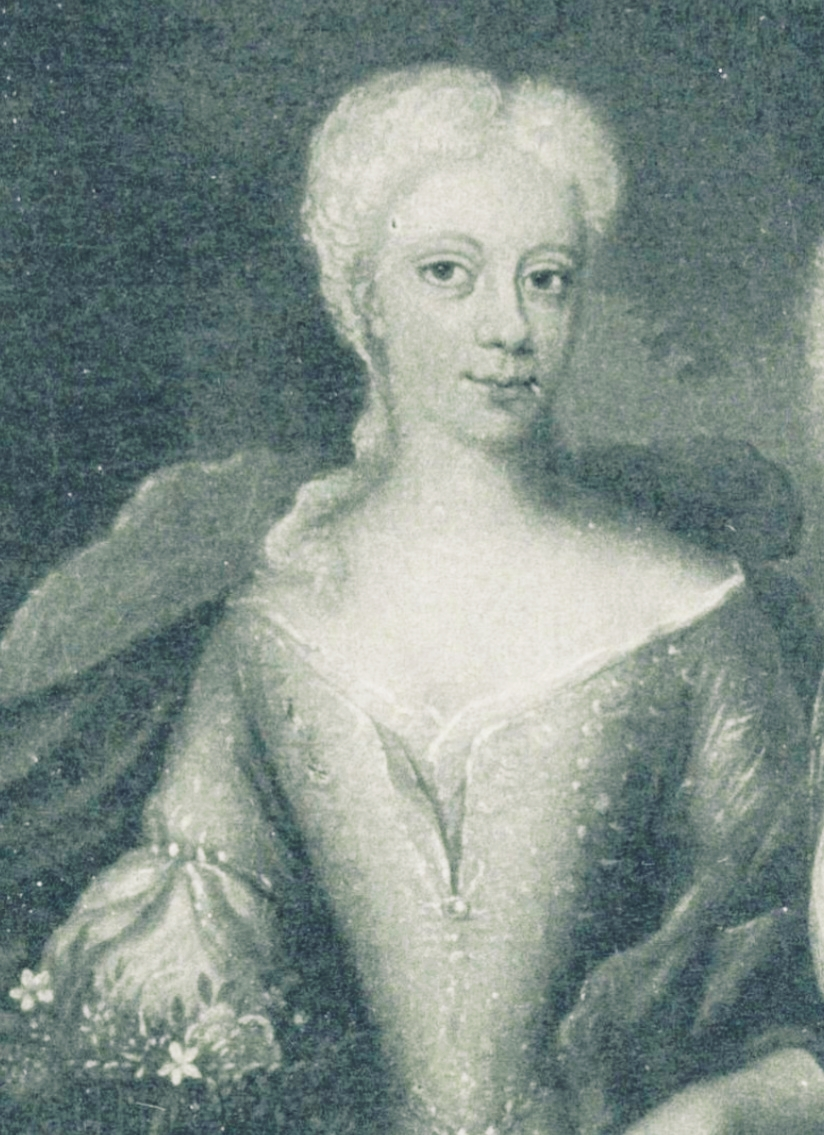
- Artist's rendition of Princess Amalia, 1734
- Born: 23 October 1710; Leeuwarden, Netherlands
- Died: 18 September 1777 (aged 66); Karlsburg Castle in Durlach, Netherlands
- Spouse: Frederick, Hereditary Prince of Baden-Durlach (m. 1727; died 1732)
- Issue: Charles Frederick, Grand Duke of Baden; William Louis
- House: Orange-Nassau
- Father: Johan Willem Friso, Prince of Orange
- Mother: Landgravine Marie Louise of Hesse-Kassel

Princess Amalia of Nassau-Dietz (Anna Charlotte Amalie; 23 October [O.S. 13 October] 1710 – 18 September 1777) was a Dutch princess and the wife of Frederick, Hereditary Prince of Baden-Durlach, and mother of Charles Frederick, the first Grand Duke of Baden.

== Life ==
Anna Charlotte Amalia was the only daughter of Johan Willem Friso of Nassau-Dietz (after 1702 Prince of Orange) and his wife, Landgravine Marie Louise of Hesse-Kassel. She had a brother, William IV, Prince of Orange (1711-1751). She grew up in Friesland and spoke West Frisian herself. Amalia was often described as quite introvert and often melancholic.

After her marriage to Friedrich of Baden-Durlach in 1727 she moved to Durlach. During her pregnancies, Amalia tyrannized her servants, and because of the princess's many tantrums, rumors circulated at the court of Durlach that she was mentally ill. Friedrich died on 26 March 1732, shortly after the birth of their second child. As further evidence of her alleged mental illness, it was charged that she shed no tears at the sight of her husband's corpse.

Her father-in-law, Margrave Karl III Wilhelm, did not want Amalia influencing the new crown prince Karl Friedrich; though mother and son continued to live in Karlsburg Castle in Durlach, Amalia lived the rest of her life in a separate apartment in the castle, shielded from the outside world. The education of her two sons, Karl Friedrich and Wilhelm Ludwig, was taken over by her mother-in-law, Magdalena Wilhelmine of Württemberg.

== Marriage and children ==
In 1727, Amalia married Frederick, Hereditary Prince of Baden-Durlach (1703–1732). They had two sons:

- Charles Frederick (22 November 1728 – 10 June 1811)
- William Louis (14 January 1732 – 17 December 1788)

== Ancestry ==
Ancestors of Princess Amalie of Nassau-Dietz

8. William Frederick, Count of Nassau-Dietz
4. Henry Casimir II, Count of Nassau-Dietz
9. Countess Albertine Agnes of Nassau
2. John William Friso, Prince of Orange
10. John George II, Prince of Anhalt-Dessau
5. Princess Henriëtte Amalia of Anhalt-Dessau
11. Princess Henriette Catherine of Nassau
1. Amalia of Nassau-Dietz
12. William VI, Landgrave of Hesse-Kassel
6. Charles I, Landgrave of Hesse-Kassel
13. Margravine Hedwig Sophia of Brandenburg
3. Landgravine Marie Louise of Hesse-Kassel
14. Jacob, Duke of Courland
7. Princess Maria Amalia of Courland
15. Margravine Louise Charlotte of Brandenburg
