= Prince William of Baden (disambiguation) =

Prince William of Baden (1792–1859) was the second son of Charles Frederick, Grand Duke of Baden.

Prince William of Baden or Prince Wilhelm of Baden may also refer to:

- Prince William Louis of Baden (1732–1788), brother of Charles Frederick, Grand Duke of Baden
- Prince William of Baden (1829–1897), third surviving son of Leopold, Grand Duke of Baden

== See also ==
- Prince Wilhelm (disambiguation)
- Prince William (disambiguation)
