= Stadhouderlijk Hof =

Former residence of the Dutch royal family

Coordinates: 53.2025°N 5.7955°E

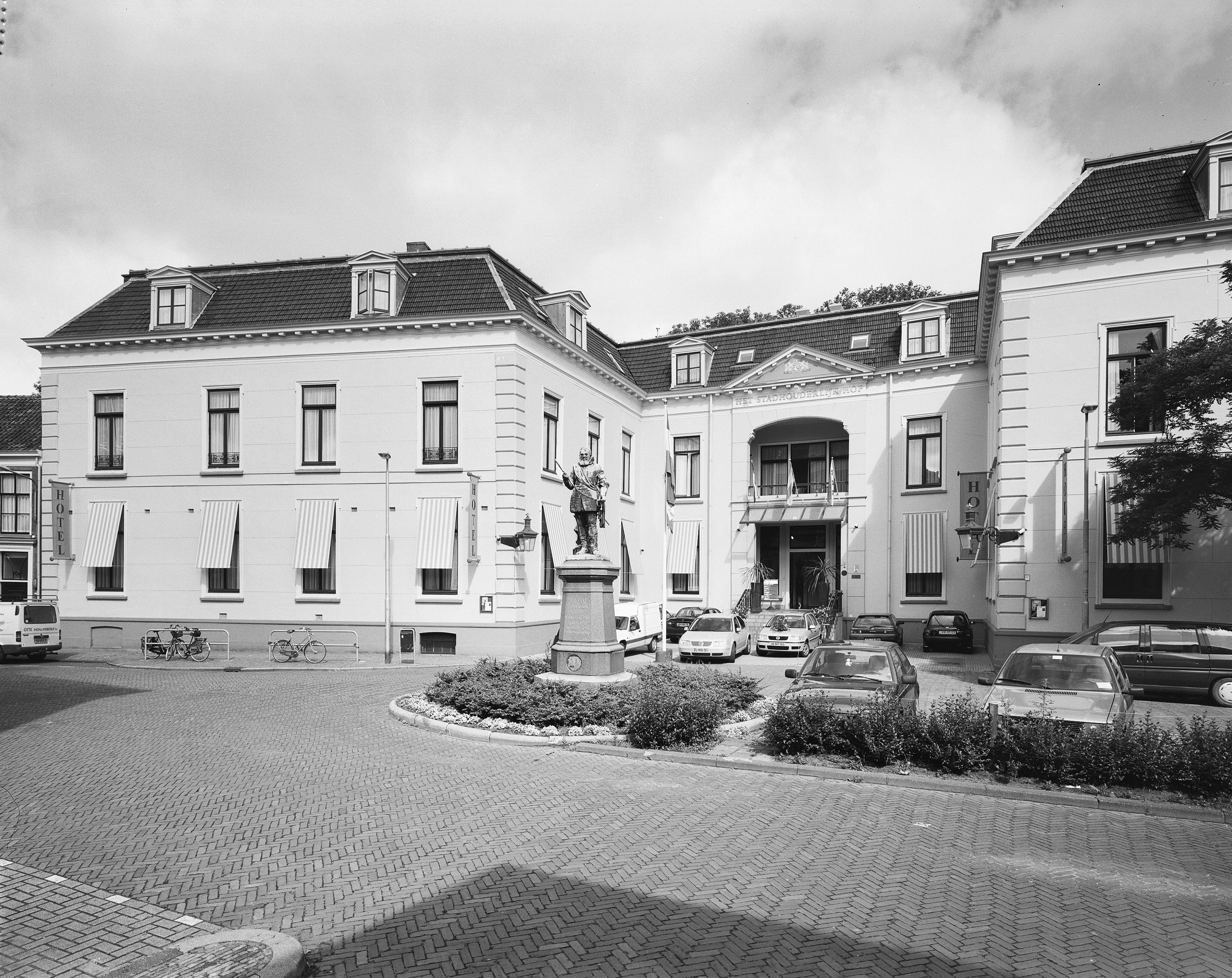
Stadhouderlijk Hof in 2000

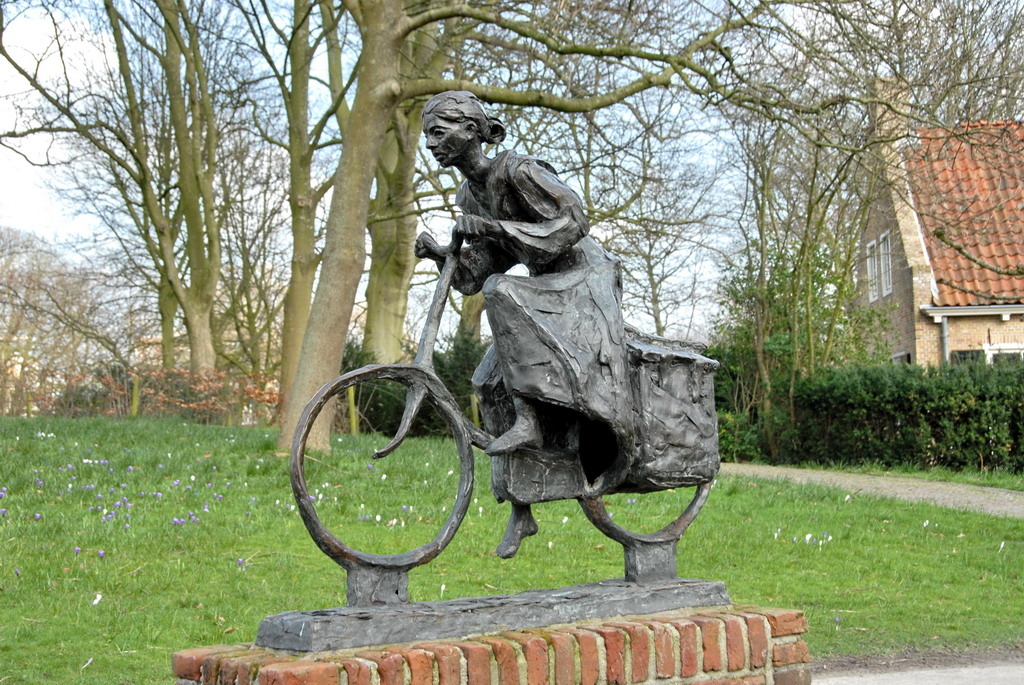
WWII monument statue in the former palace garden and now public park Prinsentuin, in Leeuwarden.

Stadhouderlijk Hof in the city of Leeuwarden is a former residence of the Dutch royal family and was owned by them until 1971.

== History ==
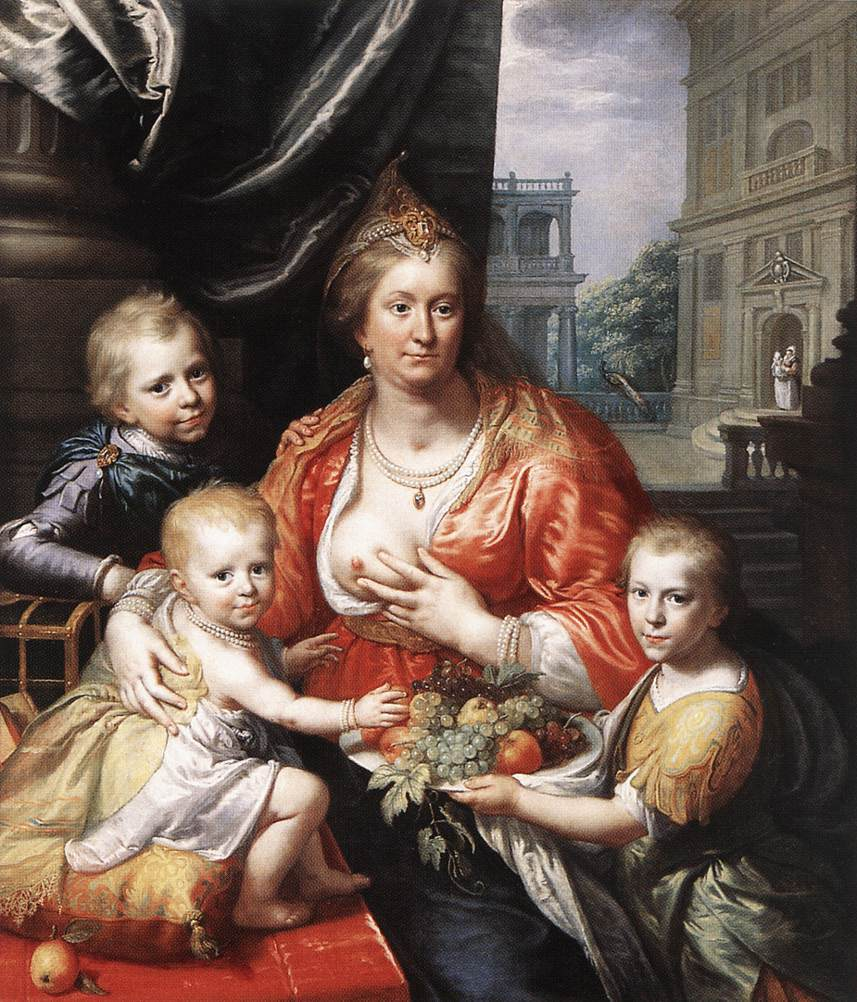
Sophia Hedwig of Brunswick-Lüneburg, wife of Ernst Casimir, with three children, probably including later owners Henry Casimir I and William Frederick, by Paulus Moreelse.

The palace was originally built in 1564 by Boudewijn van Loo, the rentmaster-general of the Spanish king and leader of the Court of Friesland. In 1587 it was purchased as the residence of William Louis, Count of Nassau-Dillenburg and his wife Countess Anna of Nassau. The couple was childless and the residence passed in 1620 to Ernst Casimir, and on his death in 1632 to his eldest son Henry Casimir I of Nassau-Dietz, and then in 1640 on his death to his younger brother William Frederick, Prince of Nassau-Dietz, whose claim to fame was becoming the guardian of the future William III of England for seven years. Today he is remembered in Leeuwarden for creating the Prinsentuin garden that still exists today.

In 1672 his son Henry Casimir II, Prince of Nassau-Dietz and in 1696, his grandson John William Friso, Prince of Orange inherited the building. This string of royal names resulted in several paintings of the royal family by leading artists of the day. Many of these paintings once hung in the portrait gallery and are now spread throughout other royal collections in the Netherlands.

Since 1996 the building has become a hotel, that has preserved the 18th-century decorations as much as possible, such as the former portrait gallery redesigned in 1710 by Daniel Marot that held 17th- and 18th-century paintings by Adriaen Hanneman, Gerard van Honthorst, Lancelot Volders, Jan van Rijmsdijck and others.
