= William (disambiguation) =

William is a male given name.

William may also refer to:

== People ==
- List of people with given name William
- King William (disambiguation), including a list of kings with the name
- Prince William (disambiguation), including a list of princes with the name
  - William, Prince of Wales (born 1982), heir apparent of Charles III, King of the United Kingdom
- Saint William (disambiguation), including a list of saints with the name
- Kyrillos William (1946–2023), Egyptian Coptic Catholic bishop
- will.i.am (born 1975), American musician
- Morgan William (born 1996), American athlete

== Arts and entertainment ==
- William (TV series), a British television series, 1962
- "William" (song), by The Others, 2005
- "William" (Haven), an episode of the television series Haven, 2013
- William (film), an American film, 2019

== Places ==
- William, United States Virgin Islands
- William, West Virginia, United States

== Other uses ==
- List of storms named William, various tropical cyclones
- William (horse), a 19th-century racehorse
- William (ship), various ships

== See also ==
- Just William (book series)
- Wilhelmus, the Dutch national anthem
- Princess William (disambiguation)
- William § Variants, including a list of various translations
- William and Catherine (disambiguation)
- William and Mary (disambiguation)
- William Street (disambiguation)
- Williams (disambiguation)
