= William Louis =

William Louis may refer to

- William Louis, Count of Nassau-Dillenburg
- William Louis, Count of Nassau-Saarbrücken
- William Louis, Duke of Württemberg
- William Louis, Prince of Anhalt-Harzgerode
- William Louis, Prince of Anhalt-Köthen
- William Louis, Prince of Baden
