= Prince Wilhelm =

Prince Wilhelm may refer to:

- Prince Wilhelm of Prussia (1783–1851), youngest child of Frederick William II, King of Prussia
- Wilhelm, Prince of Löwenstein-Wertheim-Freudenberg (1817–1887; r. 1861–1887)
- Wilhelm, Prince of Hohenzollern (1864–1927; r. 1905–1918)
- Wilhelm, Prince of Albania (1876–1945; r. 1914–1925)
- Wilhelm, German Crown Prince (1882–1951), heir apparent of Wilhelm II
- Prince Wilhelm, Duke of Södermanland (1884–1965), second son of Gustaf V, King of Sweden
- Prince Wilhelm of Prussia (1906–1940), grandson of Wilhelm II

== See also ==
- Kaiser Wilhelm (disambiguation)
  - Wilhelm I (1797–1888; r. 1871–1888), German Emperor
- Kaiser Wilhelm II (disambiguation)
  - Wilhelm II (1859–1941; r. 1888–1918), German Emperor
- Kronprinz Wilhelm (disambiguation)
- Prince Wilhelm of Sweden, protagonist of the 2021 Swedish television series Young Royals
- Prince William (disambiguation)
- Wilhelmina, Queen of the Netherlands (1880–1962; r. 1890–1948), Dutch princess by birth
- Wilhelmine of Prussia (disambiguation), including a list of princesses with the name
