= Prince William, Duke of Gloucester and Edinburgh =

Prince William, Duke of Gloucester and Edinburgh may refer to:

- Prince William Henry, Duke of Gloucester and Edinburgh, third son of Frederick, Prince of Wales
- Prince William Frederick, Duke of Gloucester and Edinburgh, son of Prince William Henry

== See also ==
- Prince William (disambiguation)
