= William of the United Kingdom =

William of the United Kingdom most commonly refers to:

- William IV (1765–1837; r. 1830–1837)
- William, Prince of Wales (born 1982), heir apparent to Charles III

William of the United Kingdom or William of Great Britain may also refer to:

- Prince William, Duke of Cumberland (1721–1765), third and youngest son of George II
- Prince William Henry, Duke of Gloucester and Edinburgh (1743–1805), grandson of George II and brother of George III
- Prince William Frederick, Duke of Gloucester and Edinburgh (1776–1834), son-in-law of George III
- Prince William of Gloucester (1941–1972), grandson of George V

== See also ==
- Prince William (disambiguation) § People, lists princes outside of British Isles named William
- Princess William (disambiguation), lists spouses of British princes named William
- William and Catherine (disambiguation)
- William of England (disambiguation), lists kings named William in one predecessor state of Great Britain
- William the Lion (c. 1142 – 1214; r. 1165–1214), also known as William I, King of Scots (another predecessor state of Great Britain)
