= John William Friso =

Prince of Orange from 1702 to 1711

Prince of Orange
- Reign: 8 March 1702 – 14 July 1711
- Predecessor: William III
- Successor: William IV

Prince of Nassau-Dietz
- Reign: 25 March 1696 – c. 1702
- Predecessor: Henry Casimir II

Prince of Orange-Nassau
- Reign: c. 1702 – 14 July 1711
- Successor: William IV

Stadtholder of Friesland and Groningen
- Reign: 25 March 1696 – 14 July 1711
- Predecessor: Henry Casimir II
- Successor: William IV
- Born: 14 August 1687; Dessau, Anhalt
- Died: 14 July 1711 (aged 23); Hollands Diep, between Dordrecht and Moerdijk
- Burial: 25 February 1712; Grote or Jacobijnerkerk, Leeuwarden
- Spouse: Landgravine Marie Louise of Hesse-Kassel (m. 1709)
- Issue: Amalia, Hereditary Princess of Baden-Durlach; William IV, Prince of Orange
- House: Orange-Nassau
- Father: Henry Casimir II, Prince of Nassau-Dietz
- Mother: Princess Henriëtte Amalia of Anhalt-Dessau

Military service
- Battles/wars: War of the Spanish Succession; Battle of Oudenarde; Siege of Lille; Crossing of the Scheldt; Siege of Ghent; Siege of Tournai; Battle of Malplaquet; Siege of Mons; Siege of Douai; Siege of Saint-Vernant

John William Friso (Dutch: Johan Willem Friso; 14 August 1687 – 14 July 1711) was the Stadtholder of Friesland and Groningen in the Dutch Republic who became the (titular) Prince of Orange in 1702. He also served in the Dutch States Army during the War of the Spanish Succession and played a major part in battles such as Oudenaarde and Malplaquet. His career came to an abrupt end when he died by accidental drowning, while crossing the Hollands Diep, in 1711. He along with his wife, Marie Louise of Hesse-Kassel, were the most recent ancestors of all reigning European monarchs from the end of World War II until 2022. This is when Charles III of the United Kingdom became monarch, and the most recent ancestors became Louis IX of Hesse-Darmstadt and Caroline of the Palatinate-Zweibrücken.

== Background ==
Born on 14 August 1687 in Dessau, Anhalt, John William Friso was the son of Henry Casimir II, Prince of Nassau-Dietz, and Princess Henriëtte Amalia of Anhalt-Dessau who were both first cousins of William III. He was also a member of the House of Nassau (the branch of Nassau-Dietz), and through the testamentary dispositions of William III became the progenitor of the new line of the House of Orange-Nassau. He was educated under Jean Lemonon, professor at the University of Franeker.

== Succession ==
With the death of William III of England and Orange, the legitimate male line of William the Silent (the second House of Orange) became extinct. John William Friso, the senior agnatic descendant of William the Silent's brother and a cognatic descendant of Frederick Henry, grandfather of William III, claimed the succession as stadtholder in all provinces held by William III. This was denied to him by the republican faction in the Netherlands.

The five provinces over which William III ruled – Holland, Zeeland, Utrecht, Gelderland and Overijssel – all suspended the office of stadtholder after William III's death. The remaining two provinces – Friesland and Groningen – were never governed by William III, and continued to retain a separate stadtholder, John William Friso. He established the third House of Orange. His son, William IV, Prince of Orange, later became stadtholder of all seven provinces.

Under William III's will, Friso stood to inherit the Principality of Orange, but due to the outbreak of the War of the Spanish Succession, Johan Willem Friso was unable to assert his claims to the principality and other possessions of William III. His inheritance was contested by his cousin, Frederick I of Prussia, as well as by his Catholic relative from Nassau-Siegen and various descendants of the old House of Chalon in France. Additionally, King Louis XIV sought to take control of the principality, which had long been a Protestant enclave. He temporarily supported the claims of the Prince of Conti, who was recognized by the French council as the rightful heir. The Protestant population was expelled, and the Principality of Orange remained in French hands following the Treaty of Utrecht in 1713, with the Prince of Conti acknowledging Louis XIV's sovereignty. The inheritance of William III and the title "Prince of Orange" became the subject of a serious dispute between the Frisian branch of the House of Nassau and the Prussian royal family, a conflict that remained unresolved at the time of Johan Willem Friso's death in 1711.

== Military career ==
=== Appointment and first military actions ===
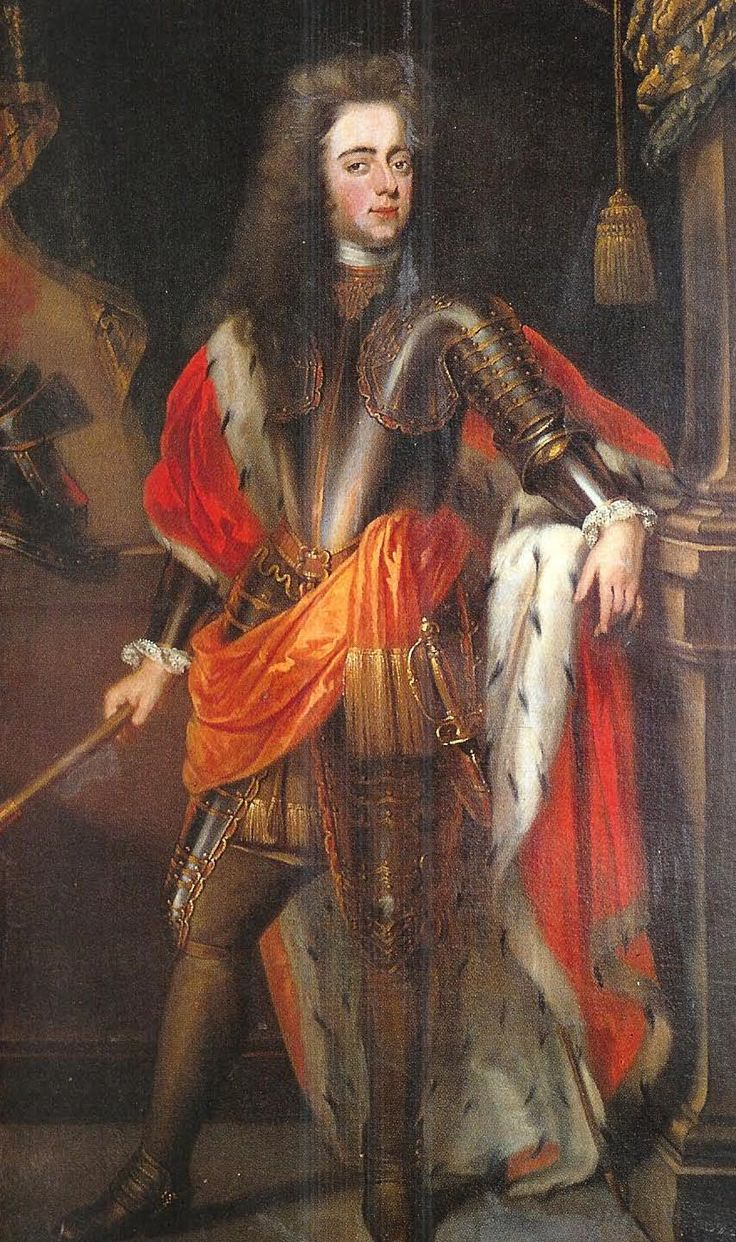
Portrait of John William Friso by Lancelot Volders, 1710

In 1702 at the start of the War of the Spanish Succession, John William Friso intended to participate in his first military campaign with the Dutch States Army under the supervision of his governor, Van Heemstra, but was prevented by a fall from his horse. He eventually joined the war effort in 1703, serving under Field Marshal Hendrik van Nassau, Lord of Ouwerkerk. In 1704, after intense debate among the Dutch provinces, he was designated the position of General of Infantry. Although only nominally, as he was just 17 years old. Efforts to appoint him as a member of the Council of State in 1705 were blocked by Holland and Utrecht, and later, in 1707, by Zeeland and Overijssel.

When John William Friso came of age in 1707, he formally assumed his titles in the northern provinces, though in Groningen this did not occur until 1708 and was subject to restrictions. He quickly earned distinction as a general. Although he had previously been present at several engagements without holding an official command – such as the siege of Ostend and the siege of Menin – his first significant action as an active participant was at the Battle of Oudenaarde. At Oudenaarde he led the flank attack of 10,000 Dutch infantrymen that would decide the battle in favour of the Allies, for which he would receive much praise in and outside the Republic.

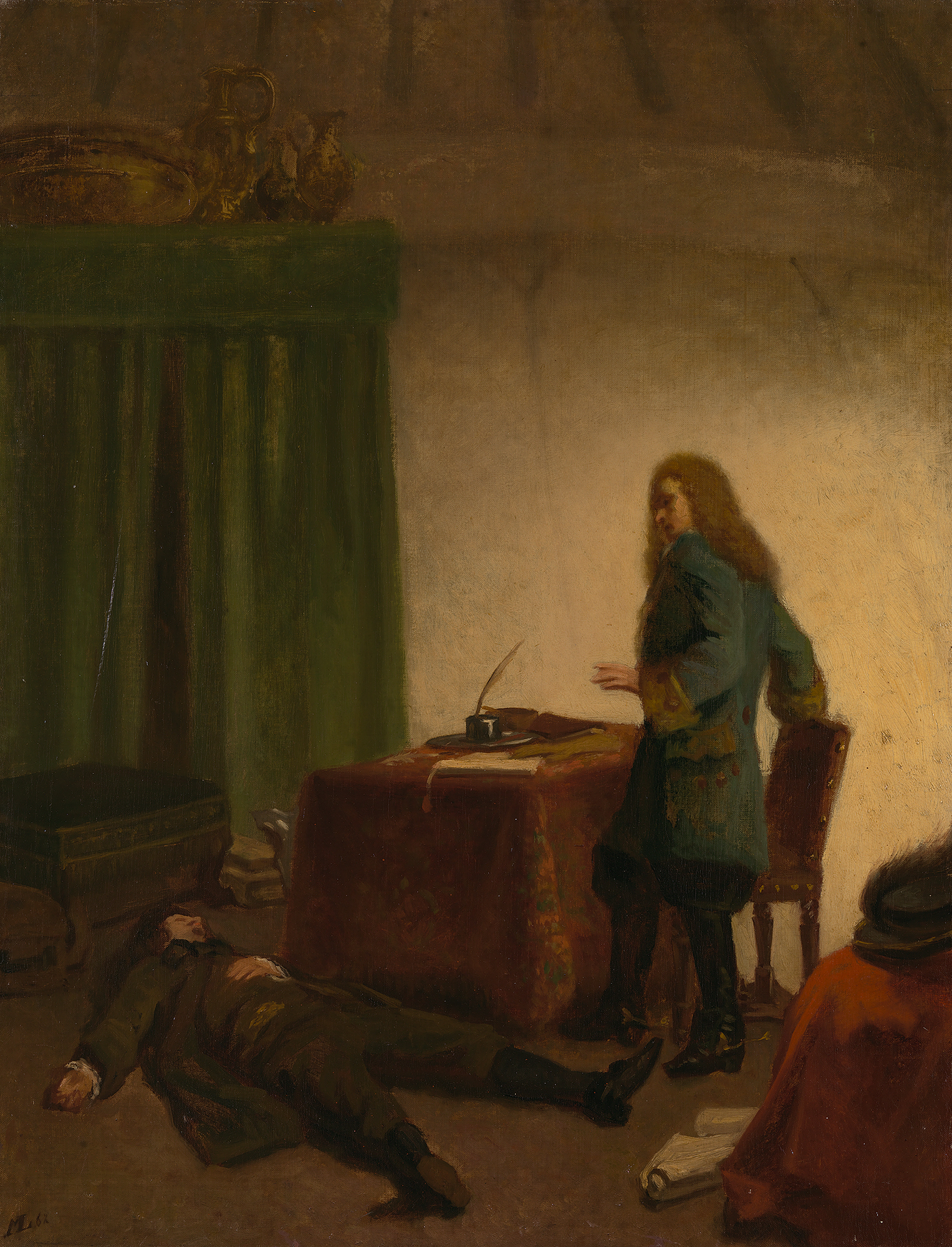
The death of Du Cerceau during the Siege of Lille

Following that battle he joined Eugene of Savoy in his siege of Lille and was in overal command of the Anglo-Dutch troops at the siege. He positioned his headquarters in the village of Lamberfart, dangerously close to the city's cannons. On August 18, a cannonball struck his quarters while he was getting dressed. The shot narrowly missed him, passing just inches from his face, but killed his chamberlain, Du Cerceau, who was standing nearby. Blood and brain matter splattered across the room, but the prince remained remarkably composed, showing more concern for the loss of his loyal servant than for his own close brush with death. Following this incident, senior officials urged him to relocate his headquarters, and he eventually moved to the safer Castle of Holbeek. Lille fell after several bloody months and the campaign was concluded with the siege of Gent and capture of Brugge in which the Prince of Orange also played his part.

In June of 1709, as the allies marched on Tournai Friso was tasked with capturing Mortange and Saint-Amand, to safeguard the siege operations against French attacks from the side of Valenciennes. The primary objective was the fort at Mortagne which controlled the crossing of the Scheldt. Friso was fortunate when, after about a dozen shots from his accompanying field guns, the drawbridge unexpectedly fell without being destroyed. Taking advantage of this, his troops swiftly stormed the fort, met little resistance, and captured the garrison.

=== Battle of Malplaquet ===
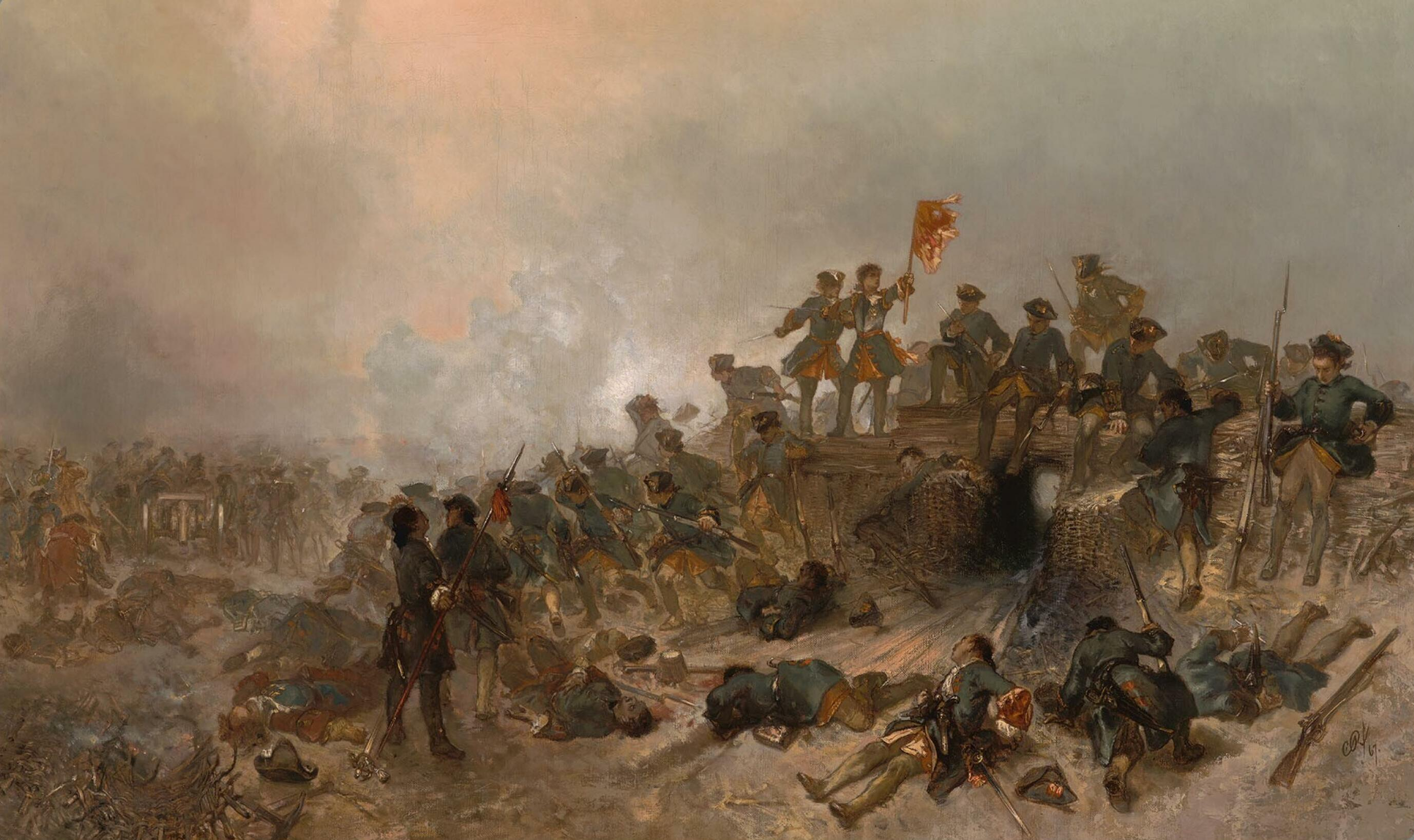
Friso at Malplaquet

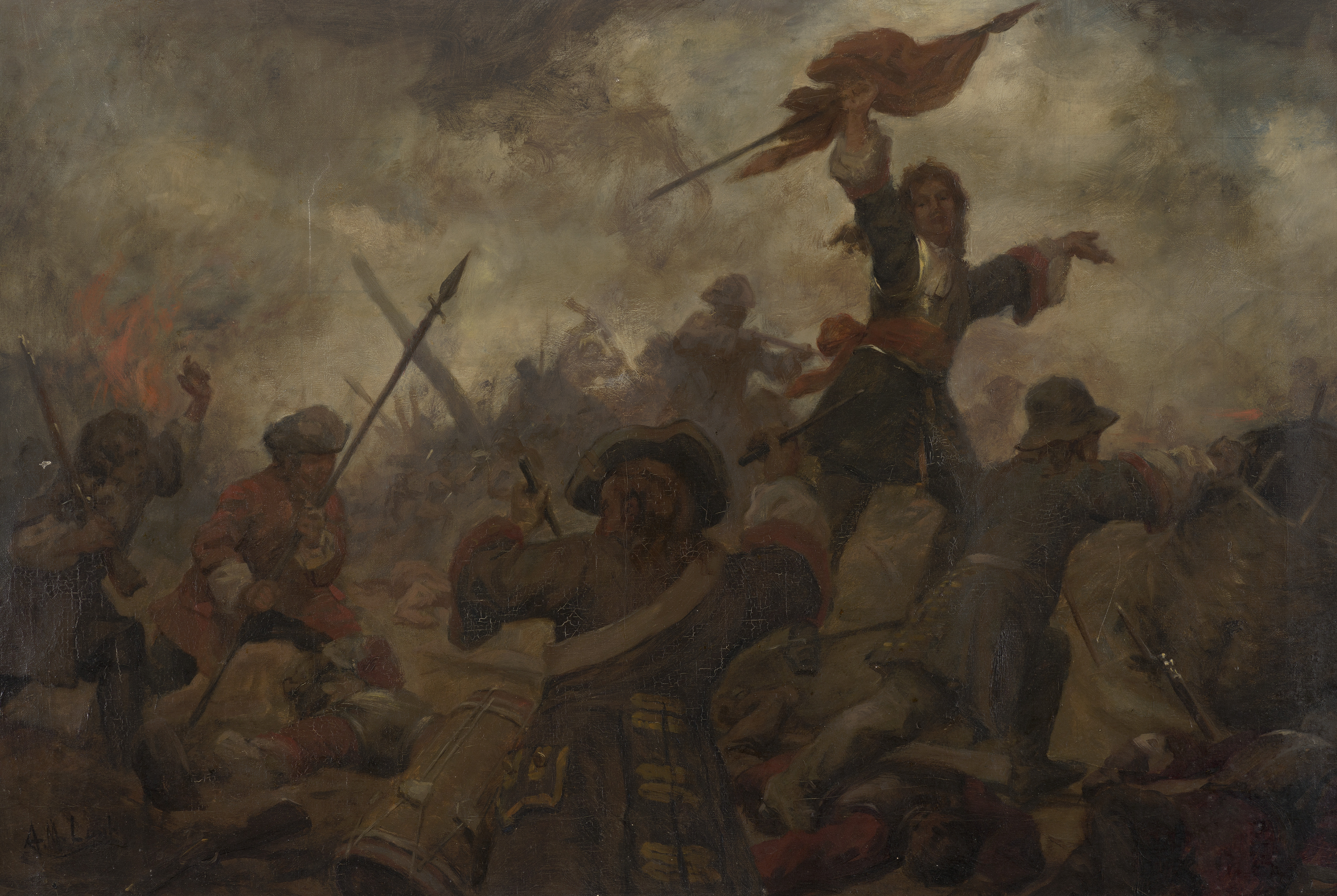
Friso at Malplaquet

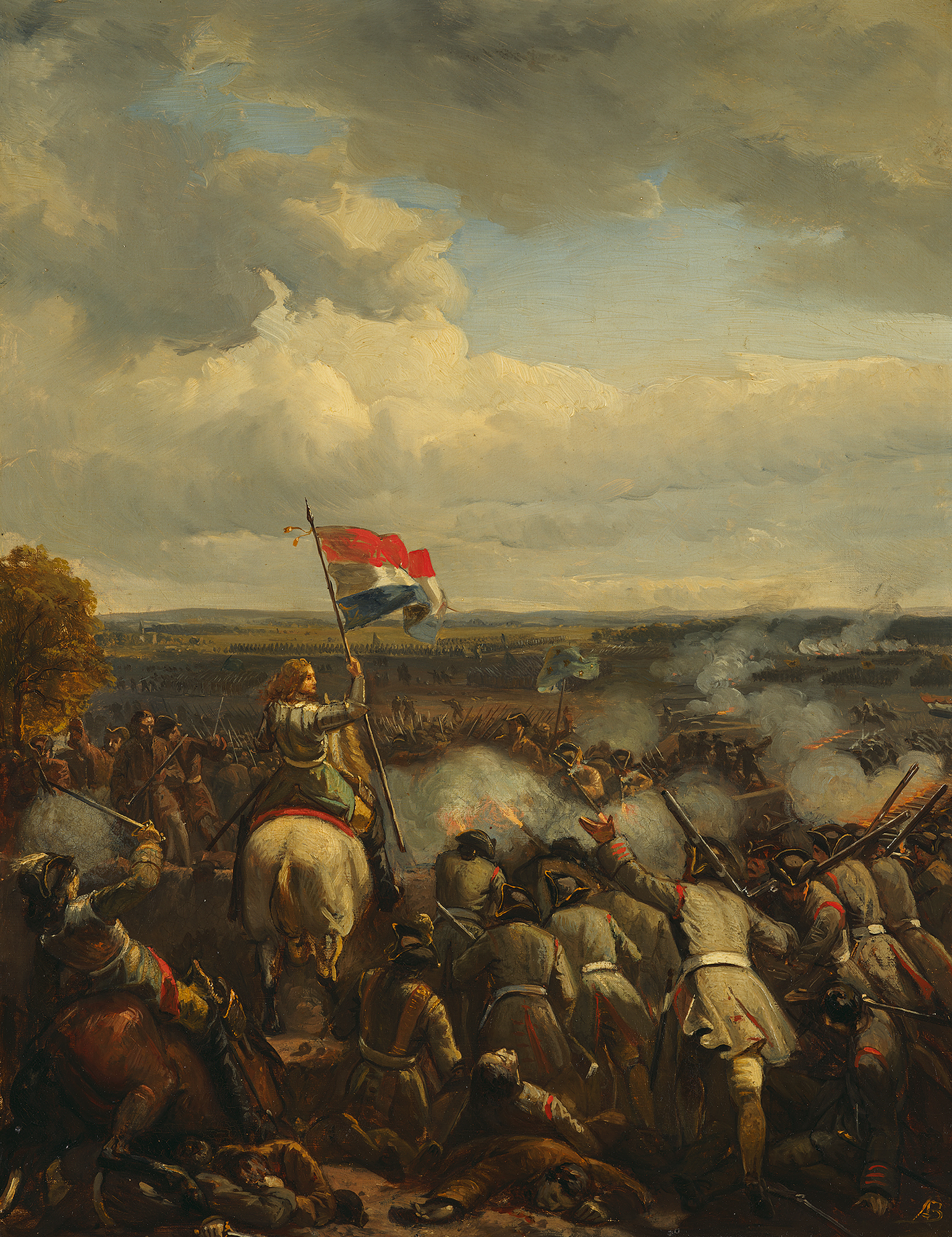
Friso at Malplaquet

Following the capture of Tournai on 3 September the French and Allied armies met at the Battle of Malplaquet. Here he commanded the infantry on the Allied left together with the very experienced François Nicolas Fagel. Overall control was exercised by Count Tilly, who had succeeded Ouwerkerk as senior Dutch commander. In reality, Tilly's anti-Orangist sympathies meant his largely pro-Orangist senior officers allegedly took their orders from John William Friso.

The Duke of Marlborough, the Allied commander in overal control, tasked the 30 Dutch infantry battalions Dutch on left with attacking the French rightwing. This was a hopeless task. The French right wing, commanded by the seasoned military leader Louis-François de Boufflers, was shielded by a forest and a strong line of entrenchments. Additionally, Boufflers commanded twice as many troops as the prince. His forces included the régiment de Picardie and the French and Swiss Guards, some of the best infantry regiments of the French army. The Dutch initially expected to be reinforced by 21 battalions under Henry Withers, which were still advancing from Tournai. However, with the plans having changed, the left flank's forces were now insufficient to execute the operation successfully.

Half an hour after the Allied right wing had engaged the enemy, John William Friso ordered his troops to join the fray. His Dutch forces, which included Scottish and Swiss regiments, were the finest in Europe. They launched three determined assaults on the French positions, but despite their tenacity and the ground they managed to seize, they were repelled each time with heavy casualties. Many Dutch infantry officers lost their lives or were severely wounded during the battle, but the prince, remarkably, remained completely unharmed. Throughout the brutal combat, he fought courageously, and had his horse shot out from under him twice. At one point, John William Friso even seized a banner from the Swiss Mey Regiment, planted it on a redoubt, and cried out to his troops: 'Follow me, my friends, here is your post!'

It was only when Frederik Sirtema van Grovestins and his cavalry approached the French fortifications from behind, and the French retreated, that John William Friso was able to capture them. The Dutch forces paid a heavy price at Malplaquet, suffering around 10,000 dead and wounded. Yet John William Friso's assaults were not in vain. These fierce attacks convinced Boufflers to not reinforce the vulnerable French center, where the Allies ultimately broke through. Nonetheless, he faced significant criticism from the Republic where he was blamed for youthful recklessness and the unnecessary sacrifice of lives. Some British historians, notably Winston Churchill, have later suggested that he turned a feigned attack into a real one in pursuit of glory. However, there is no evidence for this claim. The Dutch had been ordered to drive the enemy from their positions and advance onto the Malplaquet plateau – orders consistent with Marlborough's usual strategy of mounting multiple attacks to unbalance the enemy, and Marlborough never blamed the prince for the heavy Dutch losses. Instead, it seems more likely that both he and Orange had underestimated the strength and resilience of the French defence.

=== Last military actions and death ===
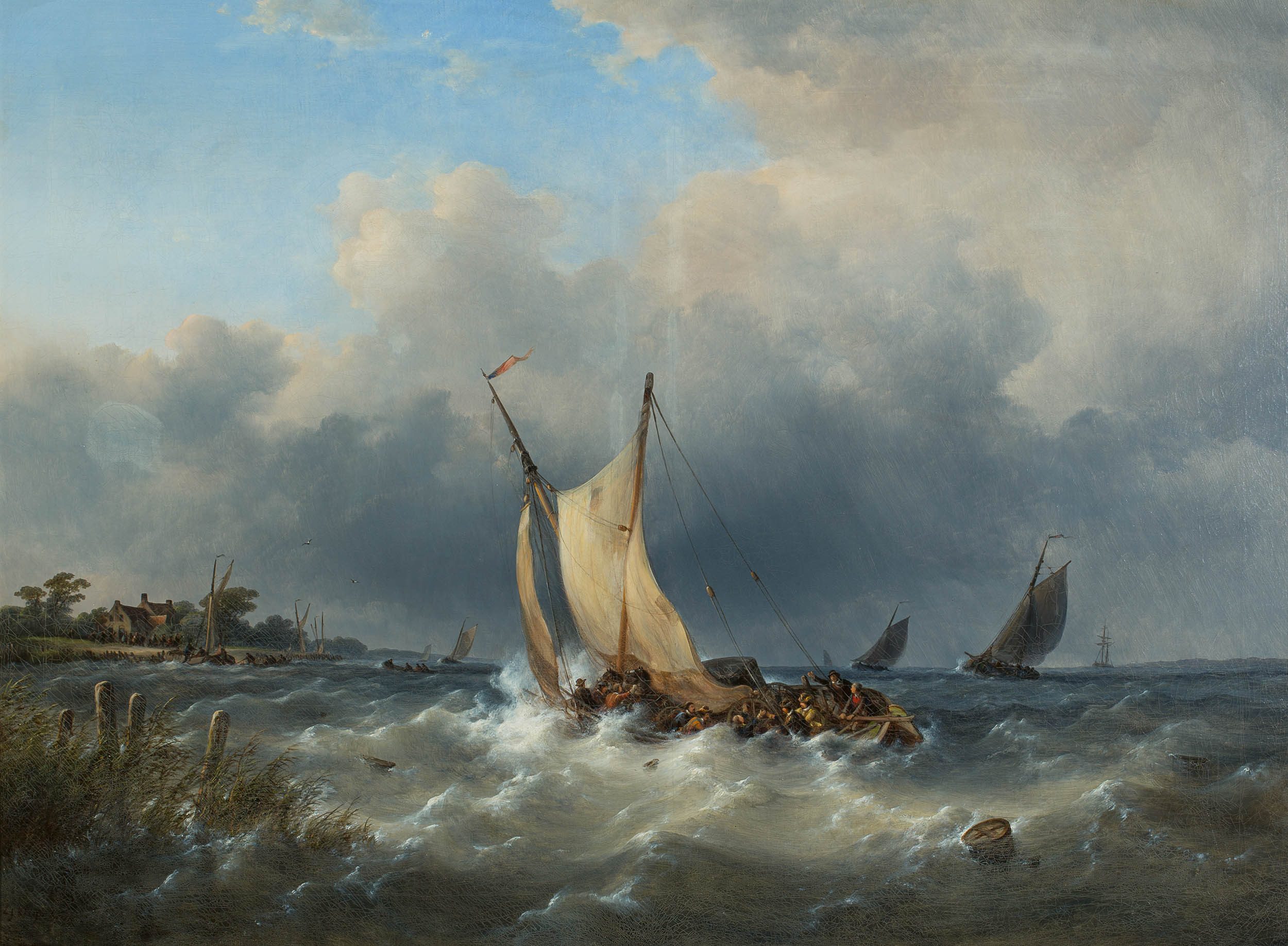
Depiction of the drowning

After Malplaquet the Allies marched on Mons and John William Friso was tasked with leading all operations at the siege. In 1710 he led the Siege of Douai together with the Prince of Anhalt-Dessau. Dessau commanded the right, while Orange led the left. During the siege, the left side made significantly more progress than the right. Years later, Hertel, the Dutch engineer who had served under Dessau, confessed to Vegelin van Claerbergen that he had sabotaged the right-wing's efforts, as the Prince of Orange had requested him – privately – that the progress be delayed there. Later that year he managed to capture Saint Vernant. The prestige that he acquired from his military service should have favored his eventual elevation as stadtholder in the remaining five provinces. However, in 1711, when traveling from the front in Flanders to meet the King of Prussia in The Hague in connection with his suit in the succession dispute, he drowned on 14 July when the ferry boat on the Moerdyk was overturned in heavy weather. His son was born six weeks after his death.

== Marriage and issue ==
On 26 April 1709, John William Friso married Princess Maria Louise of Hesse-Kassel (1688–1765), daughter of Charles I, Landgrave of Hesse-Kassel, and granddaughter of Jacob Kettler, Duke of Courland. They had two children.

Name	Birth	Death	Notes
Anna Charlotte Amalia	23 October 1710	18 September 1777	married Frederick, Hereditary Prince of Baden-Durlach; had issue, including Charles Frederick, Grand Duke of Baden
William IV, Prince of Orange	1 September 1711	22 October 1751	married Anne, Princess Royal; had issue, including William V, Prince of Orange

=== Royal descendants ===
Royal descendants of John William Friso and Marie Louise of Hesse-Kassel. Currently reigning monarchs in bold.

John William Friso	Marie Louise of Hesse-Kassel
William IV, Prince of Orange	Princess Amalia of Nassau-Dietz
William V, Prince of Orange	Princess Carolina of Orange-Nassau	Charles Frederick, Grand Duke of Baden
William I of the Netherlands	Frederick William, Prince of Nassau-Weilburg	Princess Henriette of Nassau-Weilburg	Charles Louis, Hereditary Prince of Baden
William II of the Netherlands	Prince Frederick of the Netherlands	William, Duke of Nassau	Princess Henrietta of Nassau-Weilburg	Duchess Amelia of Württemberg	Duke Alexander of Württemberg	Charles, Grand Duke of Baden	Caroline of Baden
Louise of the Netherlands	Sophia of Nassau	Princess Helena of Nassau	Adolphe, Grand Duke of Luxembourg	Archduke Karl Ferdinand of Austria	Princess Alexandra of Saxe-Altenburg	Francis, Duke of Teck	Princess Josephine of Baden	Princess Marie Amelie of Baden	Princess Sophie of Bavaria
William III of the Netherlands	Emma of Waldeck and Pyrmont	Louise of Sweden	Gustaf V of Sweden	Princess Helen of Waldeck and Pyrmont	William IV of Luxembourg	Maria Christina of Austria	Olga Constantinovna of Russia	Mary of Teck	Princess Marie of Hohenzollern-Sigmaringen	Mary Victoria Douglas-Hamilton	Archduke Karl Ludwig of Austria
Wilhelmina of the Netherlands	Christian X of Denmark	Haakon VII of Norway	Princess Ingeborg of Denmark	Prince Carl, Duke of Västergötland	Gustaf VI Adolf of Sweden	Charles Edward, Duke of Saxe-Coburg and Gotha	Charlotte, Grand Duchess of Luxembourg	Alfonso XIII of Spain	Constantine I of Greece	Prince Andrew of Greece	George VI of the United Kingdom	Albert I of Belgium	Louis II of Monaco	Archduchess Elisabeth Amalie of Austria
Juliana of the Netherlands	Olav V of Norway	Princess Märtha of Sweden	Prince Gustaf Adolf, Duke of Västerbotten	Princess Sibylla of Saxe-Coburg and Gotha	Infante Juan, Count of Barcelona	Paul of Greece	Prince Philip, Duke of Edinburgh	Elizabeth II of the United Kingdom	Princess Charlotte, Duchess of Valentinois	Franz Joseph II, Prince of Liechtenstein
Beatrix of the Netherlands	Harald V of Norway	**Carl XVI Gustaf of Sweden**	Juan Carlos I of Spain	Princess Sophia of Greece	**Charles III of the United Kingdom**	Rainier III of Monaco	**Hans-Adam II of Liechtenstein**
**Willem-Alexander of the Netherlands**	**Haakon VIII of Norway**	**Felipe VI of Spain**
Astrid of Sweden	Leopold III of Belgium
Frederik IX of Denmark	Ingrid of Sweden	Jean, Grand Duke of Luxembourg	Princess Joséphine Charlotte of Belgium	Albert II of Belgium	**Albert II of Monaco**
Margrethe II of Denmark	Henri, Grand Duke of Luxembourg	**Philippe of Belgium**
**Frederik X of Denmark**	**Guillaume V of Luxembourg**

== Legacy ==
- Monuments in Moerdijk and Strijensas, on both sides of the historic ferry crossing across the Hollands Diep, commemorate the drowning of John William Friso.
- Commemorated in a praise poem by Jetske Reinou van der Malen
- The Regiment Infantry Prins Johan Willem Friso (RI PJWF) is named in his honour.
- Central Royal Military Band of the Netherlands Army "Johan Willem Friso" is named in his honour.
- He along with his wife, Marie Louise of Hesse-Kassel, were the most recent ancestors of all reigning European monarchs from the end of World War II until 2022. This is when Charles III of the United Kingdom became monarch, and the most recent ancestors became Louis IX of Hesse-Darmstadt and Caroline of the Palatinate-Zweibrücken.

== Ancestry ==
Ancestors of John William Friso

8. Ernest Casimir, Count of Nassau-Dietz
4. William Frederick, Prince of Nassau-Dietz
9. Sophia Hedwig of Brunswick-Lüneburg
2. Henry Casimir II, Prince of Nassau-Dietz
10. Frederick Henry, Prince of Orange (=14)
5. Albertine Agnes of Nassau
11. Amalia of Solms-Braunfels (=15)
1. John William Friso, Prince of Orange
12. John Casimir, Prince of Anhalt-Dessau
6. John George II, Prince of Anhalt-Dessau
13. Agnes of Hesse-Kassel
3. Henriëtte Amalia of Anhalt-Dessau
14. Frederick Henry, Prince of Orange (=10)
7. Henriette Catherine of Nassau
15. Amalia of Solms-Braunfels (=11)

== See also ==
- Louis IX, Landgrave of Hesse-Darmstadt and Countess Palatine Caroline of Zweibrücken – Became the most recent common ancestors of all reigning hereditary European monarchs in 2022 when Elizabeth II died and her son, Charles, became king.
- Christian IX of Denmark and Louise of Hesse-Kassel – Common ancestors of many reigning hereditary European monarchs
  - Descendants of Christian IX of Denmark

== Sources ==
- Blok, P.J.; Molhuysen, P.C. (1911). "Johan Willem Friso, vorst van Nassau-Dietz". Nieuw Nederlandsch biografisch woordenboek. Deel.
- Dee, Darryl (2024). 1709: The Twilight of the Sun King. Rowman & Littlefield. ISBN 978-1-5381-7667-2.
- Van Lennep, Jacob (1880). "20". De geschiedenis van Nederland, aan het Nederlandsche Volk verteld. Deel 3 [The history of the Netherlands, told to the Dutch nation. Twintigste hoofdstuk] (in Dutch). Vol. 3. Leiden. pp. 276–291.
- Pieter Lodewijk Muller (1881). "Johann Wilhelm Friso" . Allgemeine Deutsche Biographie (in German). Vol. 14. Leipzig: Duncker & Humblot. pp. 275–276.
- Nimwegen, Olaf van (2020). De Veertigjarige Oorlog 1672–1712: de strijd van de Nederlanders tegen de Zonnekoning [The Forty Years War 1672–1712: the Dutch struggle against the Sun King] (in Dutch). Prometheus. ISBN 978-9-0446-3871-4.
- Wijn, J.W. (1959). Het Staatsche Leger: Deel VIII-2 Het tijdperk van de Spaanse Successieoorlog [The Dutch States Army: Part VIII-2 The era of the War of the Spanish Succession] (in Dutch). Martinus Nijhoff.
- Wijn, J.W. (1964). Het Staatsche Leger: Deel VIII-3 Het tijdperk van de Spaanse Successieoorlog 1711–1715 (The Dutch States Army: Part VIII-3 The era of the War of the Spanish Succession 1702–1705) (in Dutch). Martinus Nijhoff.

John William Friso House of Orange-Nassau (second creation) Cadet branch of the House of Nassau Born: 14 August 1687 Died: 14 July 1711
Dutch nobility
Preceded by William III	Prince of Orange; 1702–1711	Vacant Title next held by William IV
Regnal titles
Preceded by Henry Casimir II	Prince of Nassau-Dietz; 1696–1702	Title obsolete merged into German principality of Orange-Nassau
New title	Prince of Orange-Nassau; 1702–1711	Succeeded by William IV
Preceded by William III	Baron of Breda; 1702–1711	Succeeded by William IV
Political offices
Preceded by Henry Casimir II	Stadtholder of Friesland and Groningen; 1696–1711	Succeeded by William IV
