= William Prince =

William Prince may refer to:

- William Prince (horticulturist) (1766–1842), New York City horticulturist
- William Robert Prince (1795–1869), horticulturist
- William Prince (actor) (1913–1996), American character actor
- William Prince (cricketer) (1868–1948), English cricketer
- William Prince (musician) (born 1986), Canadian singer-songwriter
- William Prince (politician) (1772–1824), U.S. Representative from Indiana
- William Prince (1752–1810), namesake of Princeton, Kentucky
- William J. Prince (1930–2012), General Superintendent of the Church of the Nazarene
- William Stratton Prince (1824–1881), British Army officer and Chief Constable of Toronto
- William Meade Prince (1893–1951), American magazine illustrator

== See also ==
- Prince William (disambiguation)
