= William Street =

William Street may refer to:

== Streets ==
=== Australia ===
- William Street, Brisbane, Queensland
- William Street, Melbourne, Victoria
- William Street, Norwood, South Australia
- William Street, Perth, Western Australia
- William Street, Sydney, New South Wales

=== Ireland ===
- William Street, Limerick, Ireland

=== United States ===
- William Street (Carson City) in Carson City, Nevada
- William Street (Manhattan), New York City
- William Street Historic District, in Massachusetts

== People ==
- William J. Street (1784–1847), Connecticut politician, father of William C. Street
- William C. Street (1816–1893), Connecticut politician, son of William J. Street
- William Douglas Street Jr., American con artist and impersonator

== See also ==
- King William Street (disambiguation)
- William (disambiguation)
- Williams Street, an animation studio
- Williams Street Records, a record company
- William Streets (1772–?), English cricketer
- William Street tunnel
