= Siege of Mons (1709) =

1709 siege of the War of the Spanish Succession

- Part of the War of the Spanish Succession
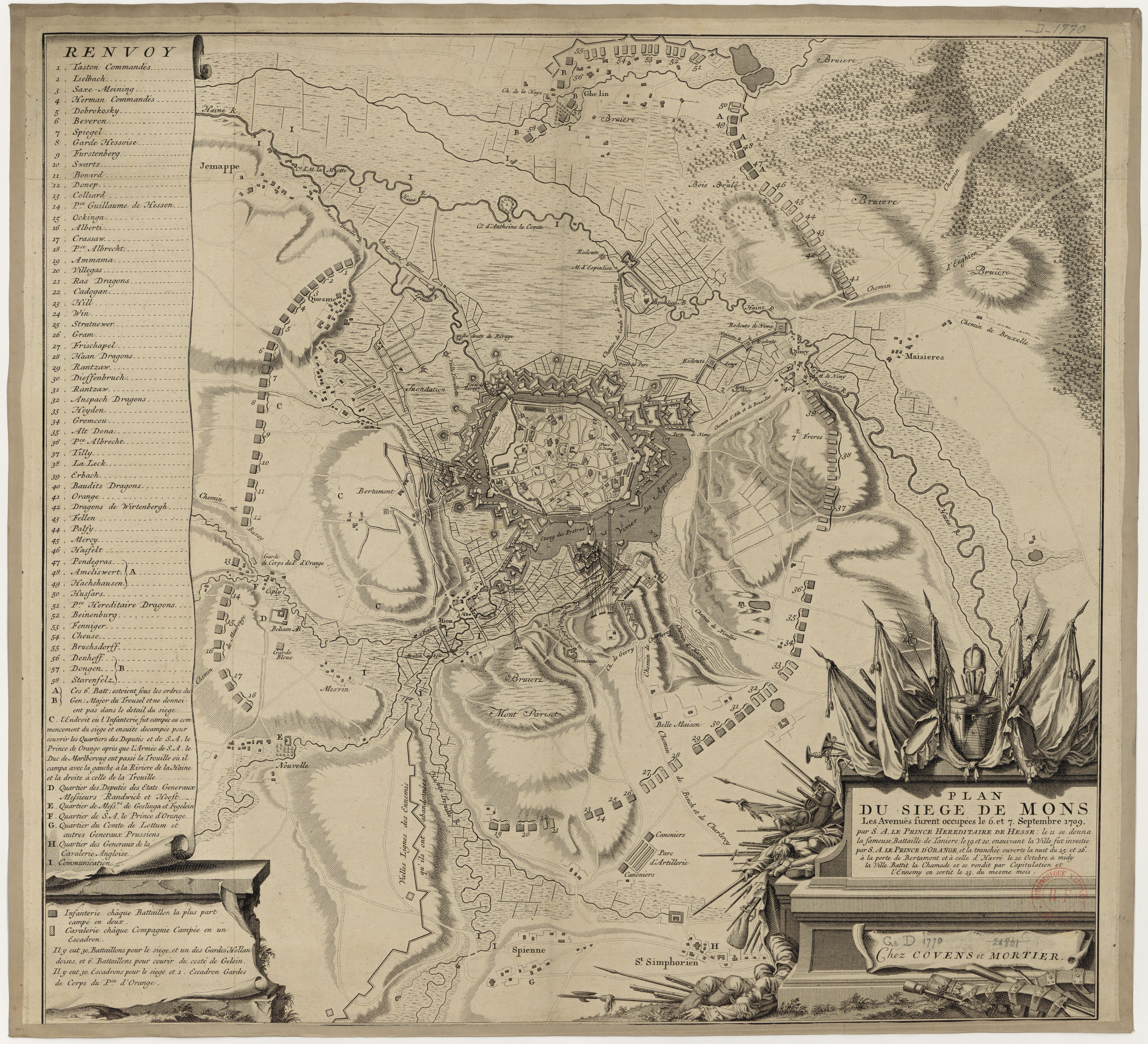
- Plan of the siege
Date	19 September – 23 October 1709
Location	Mons, Spanish Netherlands (Present-day Belgium)
Result	Grand Alliance victory

Belligerents
Dutch Republic; Great Britain; Habsburg monarchy	Bourbon Spain; France

Commanders and leaders
(Dutch Republic) Prince of Orange	Marquis de Grimaldi

Strength
21,000	3,800–4,280

Casualties and losses
1,450–2,200	700

The siege of Mons took place between 19 September and 23 October 1709 during the War of the Spanish Succession. It saw a Franco-Spanish garrison in the fortified town of Mons, then in the Spanish Netherlands, besieged by a force of the Duke of Marlborough's Grand Alliance army under the command of the Prince of Orange.

The attempt of the French Duke of Villars to relieve the siege resulted in the costly Allied victory at the Battle of Malplaquet on 11 September 1709. Following the battle, greater numbers of Allied soldiers under Eugene of Savoy joined the besieging army from late September. The Franco-Spanish garrison capitulated the following month. Owing to high Allied and French losses at Malplaquet, the capture of Mons was the final significant engagement of the campaign of 1709.

== Background ==
After taking Tournai on 3 September in a costly and prolonged siege, Marlborough immediately marched his forces to the south-east to lay siege to Mons. It was assessed that capture of the town and its fortress could open the way for an Allied advance into northern France. Villars had expected the Allies to move north-west against Ypres and hastily re-evaluated his plan, seeking permission from Louis XIV for offensive action. The king, outraged at the loss of Tournai, ordered Villars to ensure Mons was not captured by the Grand Alliance. He wrote to Villars, "Should Mons suffer the same fate as Tournai, our cause is undone. You are by every means in your power to relieve the garrison. The cost is not to be considered".

The fortress had been placed under the command of the Marquis de Grimaldi. He commanded a force of approximately 4,280 soldiers, which was largely the remnants of the army of the Spanish Netherlands. The garrison was made up of mainly Spanish troops, with smaller numbers of Bavarians and French who Villars had ordered to join the defenders when Tournai fell. The garrison was, however, understrength and insufficient to occupy the town's network of defences.

The fortifications at Mons were extensive; a wall with 18–20 ravelins, surrounded by a double ditch fed by two rivers. In addition, the town was partly situated on a hill with much swampy ground around it, which could be flooded using a system of water locks.

On 3 September, while Tournai's surrender was still being negotiated, Marlborough sent a small force under the Earl of Orkney to probe Mons' defences. On 6 and 7 September, the Prince of Hesse-Kassel, with 60 squadrons of cavalry and several battalions of infantry, advanced to block the road to Mons. They were soon joined by 40 further squadrons of cavalry under Earl Cadogan. By 8 September, Marlborough had established himself to the south-west of Mons, and Eugene had positioned himself to the west.

On 9 September, Villars, assisted by Marshal Boufflers, took up positions to the southwest. In order to neutralise this threat to the Allied siege force, Marlborough ordered an assault on Villars and Boufflers' well-defended positions, resulting in the costly Allied victory at the Battle of Malplaquet on 11 September 1709.

== Siege ==
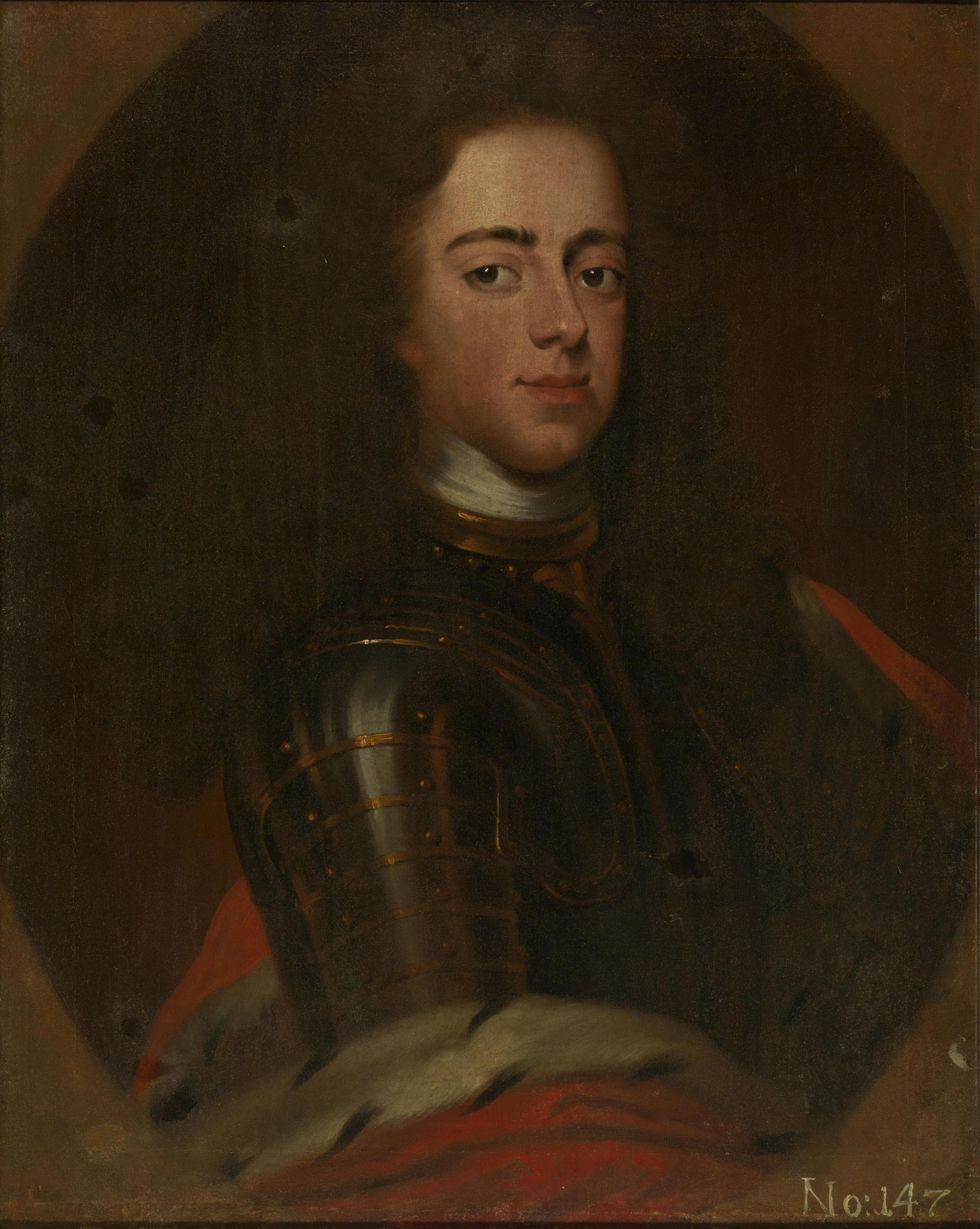
The Prince of Orange, who commanded the Dutch, British and Imperial force during the siege

Following the neutralisation of the French threat, Marlborough and Eugene directed a force under the Prince of Orange to surround the city of Mons, which was done on 19 and 20 September. The Prince's force comprised approximately 30 battalions, of which at least 14 were Dutch and 4 were British, and 33 squadrons amounting to around 10,000 soldiers. On the orders of Boufflers, three French battalions had successfully slipped through the Allied lines from Malplaquet to reinforce Mons. On 24 September, the Prince attacked the outer-works of the fortress. The following day, Eugene arrived at Mons with the main siege corps of the Allied army. Boufflers received orders from Louis to not risk another battle, and therefore no attempt was made by the French to relieve Mons once the siege was underway.

On the night of 26 September, a two-pronged assault on the fortress was attempted. However, many Allied soldiers became lost in the darkness. The approach was only noticed by the garrison when moonlight illuminated the scene, resulting in heavy Allied loses.

The Allies began the construction of trenches and artillery positions, but work was hampered by torrential rain and constant shelling from the defenders. Both Cadogan and Richard Molesworth were injured. On 10 October, Marlborough wrote to the Earl of Sunderland from his camp at Havré to express his frustration at the weather's impact on the siege's progress. To combat the problem, Allied troops dug ditches to drain the water into the river Trouille and reinforced the ground with fascines. The Franco-Spanish defenders attempted a sortie with 300 soldiers, who engaged a British regiment before being driven back by reinforcements. On 16 October, the Allies launched a successful but costly attack on the counterscarp at the Gate of Havre.

On 19 October, construction of the Allied artillery redoubt was completed and breaching batteries had been established. That morning the batteries began firing upon the town's defences, with great success. At noon on 20 October, observing the Allied preparations for an assault supported by artillery, Grimaldi sounded the chamade and signalled his intention to surrender. On 23 October, the Franco-Spanish accepted the Allied terms of capitulation and the garrison's remaining 1,500 men left Mons with the honours of war but without their cannon or mortars.

== Aftermath ==
After losing Mons, the French and Spanish were forced to evacuate the area between the Sambre and Meuse rivers. The States of the County of Hainaut, with its capital in Mons, recognised Charles VI, Holy Roman Emperor as Charles III of Spain. Owing to heavy French and Allied loses at Malplaquet, the capture of Mons marked the final engagement of the 1709 campaign season in the war. The Allied armies dispersed into winter quarters until 1710.
