= Lancelot Volders =

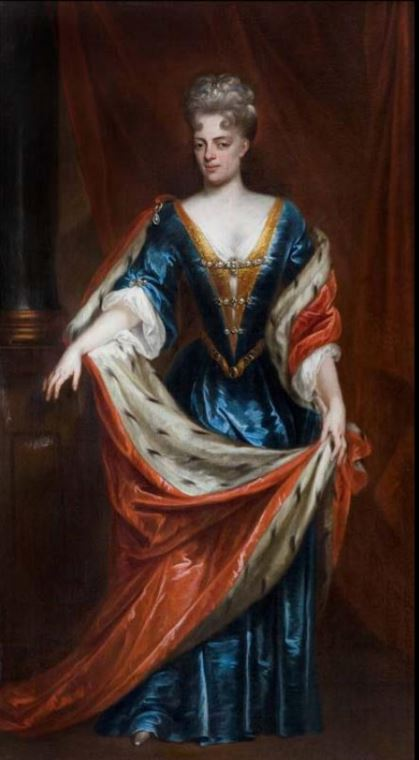
Portrait of Landgravine Marie Louise of Hesse-Kassel

Lancelot Volders also erroneously known as Louis Volders, Lois Volders and Jan Volders (10 March 1636 (baptized) – 23 March 1723 (buried)) was a Flemish painter who specialised mainly in individual and group portraits but also produced a few history paintings and genre scenes. After training and working in Brussels, he may have worked after about 1700 from time to time at the Stadhouderlijk Hof in Leeuwarden.

== Life ==
For a long time it was believed that the painters Lancelot Volders and Louis Volders were different persons and that the works signed 'L. Volders' and in a single case 'Louis Volders' had to be ascribed to the painter Louis Volders. Research by art historian Leen Kelchtermans published in 2013 has demonstrated that there is a preponderance of evidence for the conclusion that Lancelot Volders and Louis Volders are in fact the same person and that the correct first name was not Louis but Lancelot. In older literature, the artist was also mistakenly referred to as Jan Volders as the result of an incorrect reading of his signature.

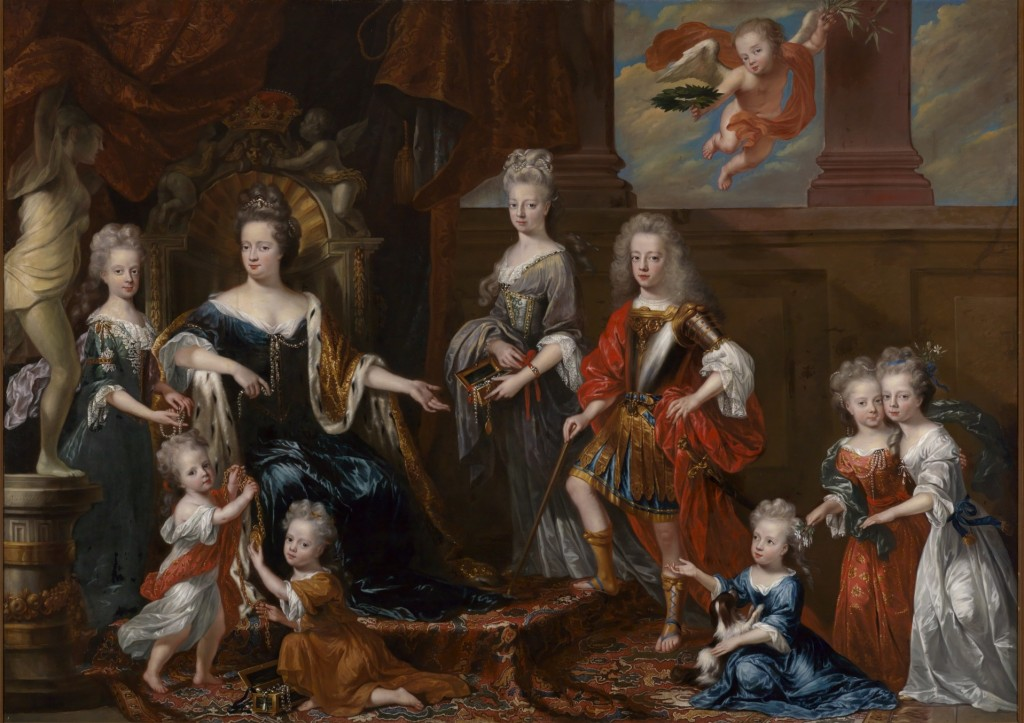
Henriëtte Amalie van Anhalt-Dessau with her children

Volders was born in Brussels, the son of Joris Volders. He was registered on 8 April 1650 at the Brussels Guild of St Luke as a pupil of Pieter van Ghindertaelen, a popular artist at the time. He is also said to have been a pupil of Gaspard de Crayer, a prominent portrait and history painters originally from Antwerp. There is no record of such apprenticeship in the Brussels Guild records. In 1657 he became a master in the Brussels Guild of St Luke. Lancelot was principally active in Brussels between 1657 and 1723. He died and was buried in Brussels.

Volders worked from the 1690s on commissions for members of the court of the Stadtholder of Friesland in Leeuwarden. He became court painter to Henry Casimir II, Prince of Nassau-Dietz. It is possible that during his active period in Brussels he was discovered by Princess Henriëtte Amalia of Anhalt-Dessau, the wife of Henry Casimir II, Prince of Nassau-Dietz, the Stadtholder of Friesland and Groningen, during her visit to Brussels in 1689. It is not entirely clear whether Volders stayed in Brussels and painted the members of the Stadholder family there (for example Johan Willem Friso in 1707) or traveled to and resided in Leeuwarden for that purpose. In Leeuwarden itself no traces of his residence are found, except for a "Volders room" mentioned in an inventory of the court of the Stadtholder.

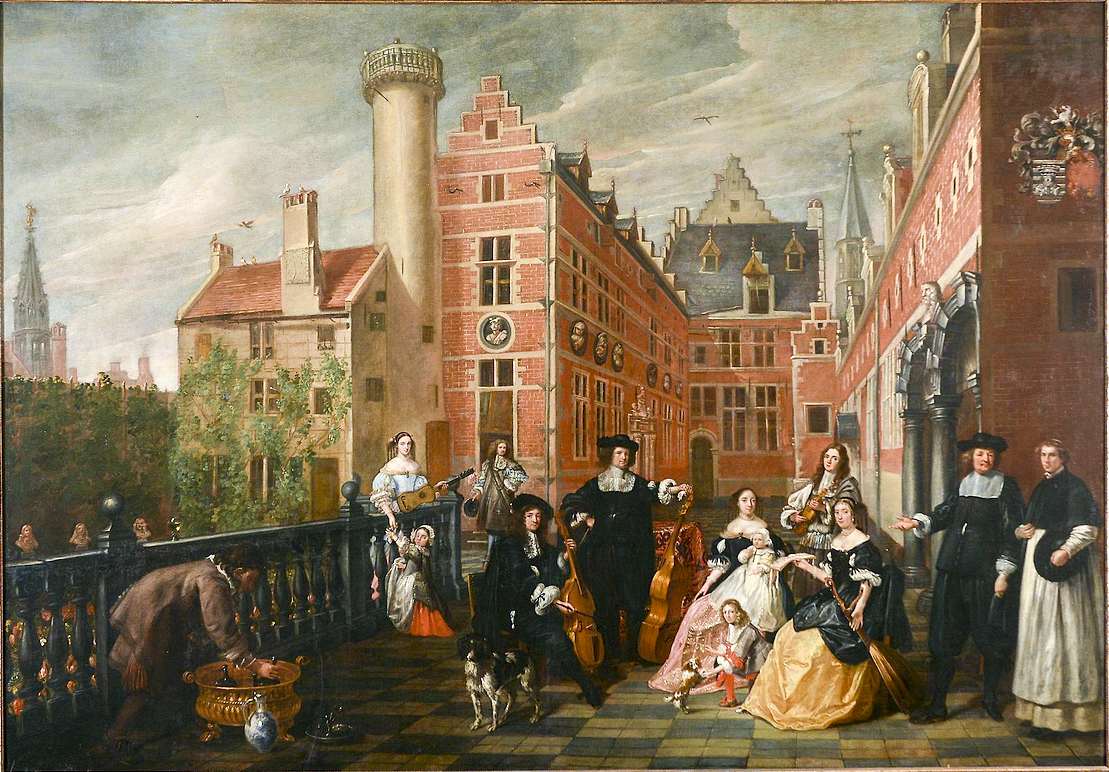
Family portrait in the courtyard of a Brussels palace

Volders may also have worked in Leuven in 1703 as evidenced by a signed and presumably dated group portrait (formerly in the Town Hall of Leuven, now in M – Museum Leuven, Leuven). The work is traditionally believed to represent seven city magistrates of Leuven gathered around a table presenting the bills. However, the date that was observed on the painting in the 19th century is no longer visible putting its dating in doubt. It is also not firmly established that the persons depicted are Leuven’s city magistrates.

The prominent Brussels painter Victor Honoré Janssens was a pupil of Lancelot Volders for eight years starting from 1676. Volders also trained lesser known figures such as Frans Thierlincx (1663), Johannes de Reyff (1677) and Hendrick de Vos (1677).

== Work ==
Lancelot Volders was a specialist portrait painter but also created history paintings and genre scenes. The last works of Lancelot Volders are dated by Rudi Ekkart to 1713.

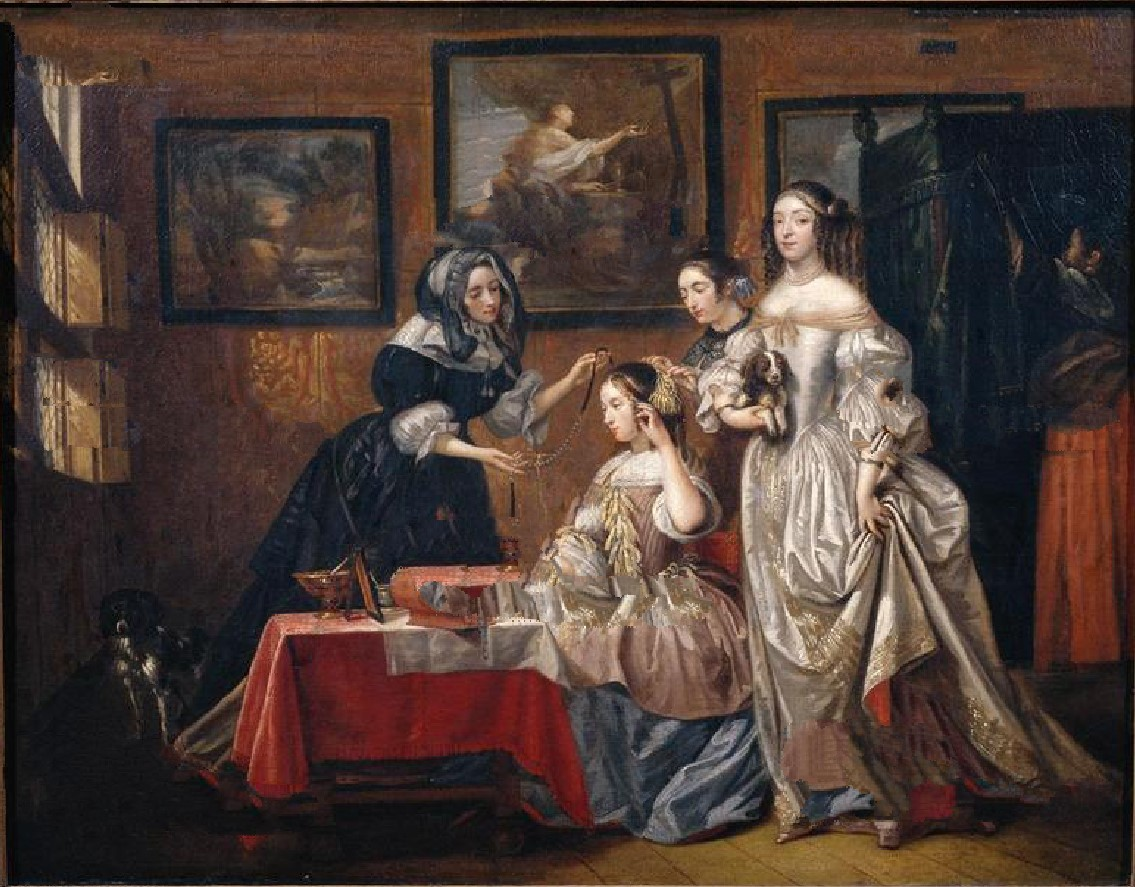
Ladies with their servants

He created group and individual portraits, mainly of the members of the Stadtholder court in Leeuwarden. He also painted in Leeuwarden portraits of the local aristocracy. He worked in a style close to that of Gonzales Coques and Hieronymus Janssens. In Flanders, the artist also created a number of group portraits. One of the most notable ones is the signed and dated Family portrait in the courtyard of a Brussels palace (1666, Museum of the City of Brussels). This early work of the artist presents a portrait of a family as well as of a home. The composition shows 13 persons in front of a patrician residence in Brussels. In the background the Brussels Town Hall is discernible. The sitters comprise men, women and children and a mix of aristocrats and bourgeois. Five of them are holding stringed instruments (lute, viols and violins). At the centre of the group is a child who is wearing red heels, an indication that he is of royal descent.

Volders was also a painter of history paintings and genre scenes. He painted an Entombment of Christ for the Rich Clares convent in Brussels. A picture entitled Ladies with their servants (Franz Mayer Museum, Mexico) shows two courtesans busy making their toilet with their servants in attendance. The cosmetics, perfumes, jewelry and luxurious costumes of the courtesans contrast with the simple clothes of the servants. A bed shown on the right-hand side of the composition corroborates the interpretation that this is a scene of courtesans and not of bourgeois ladies.

Portraits by Volders are in the collections of the Royal Collection of the Netherlands, the collections of German and Dutch descendants of the Dutch kings and of the Friesian Stadtholders. The Rijksmuseum in Amsterdam has examples of miniatures made after his portraits. His works are further in the collections of the Fries Museum and Sminia (now Hans von Herwarth).
