= Prince William (disambiguation) =

William, Prince of Wales (born 1982), is the heir apparent to Charles III, King of the United Kingdom.

Prince William may also refer to:

== People ==
=== Danish ===
- Prince William of Denmark (1687–1705), youngest son of Frederick V, King of Denmark
- Prince William of Denmark (1845–1913), later George I, King of the Hellenes (r. 1863–1913)

=== Dutch ===
- Prince William of the Netherlands (1792–1849), later William II, King of the Netherlands (r. 1840–1849)
- Prince William of the Netherlands (1817–1890), later William III, King of the Netherlands (r. 1849–1890)
- William, Prince of Orange (1840–1879), eldest son of William III, King of the Netherlands

=== English ===
- William of the United Kingdom (disambiguation), multiple princes
- William Adelin (1103–1120), only legitimate son of Henry I, King of England
- Prince William, Duke of Gloucester (1689–1700), only child of Anne, Queen of Great Britain, to survive infancy

=== German ===
- Prince William of Baden (disambiguation), multiple princes
- Prince William of Saxe-Gotha-Altenburg (1701–1771), second surviving son of Frederick II, Duke of Saxe-Gotha-Altenburg
- Prince William of Hesse-Kassel (1787–1867), grandson of Frederick II, Landgrave of Hesse-Kassel
- Prince William of Prussia (1797–1888), later Wilhelm I, German Emperor (r. 1871–1888)
- Prince William of Hesse-Philippsthal-Barchfeld (1831–1890), fourth son of Charles, Landgrave of Hesse-Philippsthal-Barchfeld
- Prince William of Schaumburg-Lippe (1834–1906), third son of George William, Prince of Schaumburg-Lippe
- Prince William of Prussia (1858–1941), later Wilhelm II, German Emperor (r. 1888–1918)

=== Luxembourgish ===
- William IV, Grand Duke of Luxembourg (1852–1912; r. 1905–1912), Luxembourgish prince by birth

== Places ==
=== Canada ===
- Prince William Parish, New Brunswick
  - Prince William, New Brunswick, an unincorporated community within Prince William Parish

=== United States ===
- Prince William, Indiana
- Prince William County, Virginia
  - Prince William Parkway, a highway within Prince William County

== Ships ==
- HMS Prince William, two ships of the Royal Navy
- USS Prince William (CVE-19), an escort carrier of the United States Navy
- USS Prince William (CVE-31), an escort carrier of the United States Navy
- PNS Rah Naward, a British tall ship formerly called Prince William

== Other uses ==
- Prince William (TV series), a 2014 Taiwanese television series

== See also ==
- Guillaume V, Grand Duke of Luxembourg (born 1981; r. 2025–present), Luxembourgish prince by birth
- King William (disambiguation)
  - William of England (disambiguation), including a list of kings with the name
- Prince Guillaume of Luxembourg (born 1963), youngest child of Jean, Grand Duke of Luxembourg
- Prince Wheeliam, a fictional character in Cars 2 based on Prince William, Duke of Cambridge
- Prince Wilhelm (disambiguation)
- Prince William Henry (disambiguation)
- Prince William Sound, Alaska, United States
- Princess William (disambiguation)
- Prince Willem of the Netherlands (1833–1834), eldest son of Prince Frederick of the Netherlands
- Prins Willem, a Dutch ship
- William (disambiguation)
  - List of people with given name William
    - William Prince (disambiguation)
- William and Catherine (disambiguation)
- William, Prince of Wied (1845–1907), father of Wilhelm, Prince of Albania
