= Frederick, Hereditary Prince of Baden-Durlach =

Hereditary prince and major general in the German Imperial army

- Born: 7 October 1703
- Died: 26 March 1732 (aged 28)
- Spouse: Amalia of Nassau-Dietz (m. 1727)
- Issue: Charles Frederick, Grand Duke of Baden; William Ludwig
- House: House of Zähringen
- Father: Charles III William, Margrave of Baden-Durlach
- Mother: Magdalena Wilhelmine of Württemberg

Frederick, Hereditary Prince of Baden-Durlach (7 October 1703 – 26 March 1732) was a German hereditary prince of the Margraviate of Baden-Durlach.

Frederick was the son of Charles III William, Margrave of Baden-Durlach, and Magdalena Wilhelmine of Württemberg (7 November 1677 - 30 October 1742), the daughter of William Louis, Duke of Württemberg.

He became heir apparent when his elder brother Charles Magnus died in 1712. However, he died before his father did and therefore never came to government in Durlach.

He served in the imperial army. In 1724, he was appointed colonel, in 1728, he was promoted to major general.

== Marriage and descendants ==
On 3 July 1727, Frederick married Amalia of Nassau-Dietz (born 13 October 1710, died 17 September 1777), the daughter of John William Friso, Prince of Orange. They had the following children:

- Charles Frederick, Grand Duke of Baden (born 22 November 1728, died 10 June 1811), Margrave and later first Grand Duke of Baden
- William Ludwig (born 14 January 1732, died 17 December 1788)
