= King William Street =

King William Street may refer to:

- King William Street, Adelaide in Adelaide, South Australia
- King William Street (Hamilton, Ontario) in Hamilton, Ontario
- King William Street, Kent Town in Kent Town, an inner suburb of Adelaide, South Australia
- King William Street, London in London, United Kingdom
- King William Street tube station, a closed London Underground station

== See also ==
- William Street (disambiguation)
- King William (disambiguation)
