= William of England =

William of England may refer to:

- William the Conqueror (c. 1028 – 1087; r. 1066–1087), King of England
- William II of England (c. 1057 – 1100; r. 1087–1100), King of England and also known as William Rufus
- William III of England (1650–1702; r. 1689–1702), King of England and also known as William of Orange
- William IV (1765–1837; r. 1830–1837), King of the United Kingdom, which includes England

== See also ==
- King William (disambiguation)
  - William the Lion (c. 1142 – 1214; r. 1165–1214), also known as William I, King of Scots
- Prince William (disambiguation)
  - William of the United Kingdom (disambiguation)
    - William, Prince of Wales (born 1982), heir apparent to United Kingdom
- William England (priest) (1767–1834), Archdeacon of Dorset
- William England (1816 to 1830 – 1896), English photographer
