= Princess William =

Princess William most commonly refers to:

- Catherine, Princess of Wales (born 1982), wife of William, Prince of Wales

Princess William may also refer to:

- Maria Walpole (1736–1807), wife of Prince William Henry, Duke of Gloucester and Edinburgh
- Princess Mary, Duchess of Gloucester and Edinburgh (1776–1857), wife of Prince William Frederick, Duke of Gloucester and Edinburgh
- Adelaide of Saxe-Meiningen (1792–1849), queen consort of William IV, King of the United Kingdom (formerly Prince William, Duke of Clarence and St Andrews)

== See also ==
- Matilda of Anjou (c. 1111 – 1154), wife of William Adelin (heir apparent of Henry I, King of England)
- Wilhelmina, Queen of the Netherlands (1880–1962; r. 1890–1948), known as Princess Wilhelmina prior to and after her reign
- Prince William (disambiguation)
- William of the United Kingdom (disambiguation)
