= William (ship) =

Several vessels have been named William:

- William (1770 ship) was a merchant vessel built in France in 1770 or 1771. From 1791 she made numerous voyages as a whaler. She also made one voyage in 1793 transporting supplies from England to Australia. She then resumed whaling, continuing until 1809.
- William (1797 ship) was launched in Spain in 1788, almost certainly under another name. She was taken in prize in 1797. William sailed as a West Indiaman until 1800 when new owners started to sail her as a slave ship in the triangular trade in enslaved people. She made four complete voyages as a slave ship. A report of her fourth voyage provides insight into the decision making over the planning of the voyage. Spanish privateers captured her in 1805 on her fifth slave voyage.
- William (1800 ship) was launched at the Bombay Dockyard as a country ship. In 1801 she served as a transport in a naval campaign. In 1809 she made a voyage to London for the British East India Company (EIC). She survived several maritime incidents while sailing as a West Indiaman.
- William (1806 ship) was launched in Spain under another name and was taken in prize circa 1806. She made one voyage as a Liverpool-based slave ship. Thereafter she traded between Liverpool and Madeira. In 1814 an American privateer captured William.
- William (1811 ship) was launched in 1811 at Kingston upon Hull. She spent her career as a whaler in the northern whale fishery. She was wrecked on 2 July 1830.
- William (1811 Blythe ship) (or Williams) was launched at Blyth in 1811. In 1818 a letter of marque captured her but she was then released. In October 1819 she fortuitously discovered the South Shetland Islands while on a voyage from Buenos Aires to Valparaiso. She was last listed in 1829.
- William was launched in 1814 at Topsham as HMS Tyne, which the Royal Navy sold in January 1825. Daniel Bennet & Sons purchased William for service as a whaler in the British southern whale fishery. She was lost in the Bonin Islands in 1827.
