= Grote or Jacobijnerkerk =

Grote Kerk or Jacobijnerkerk
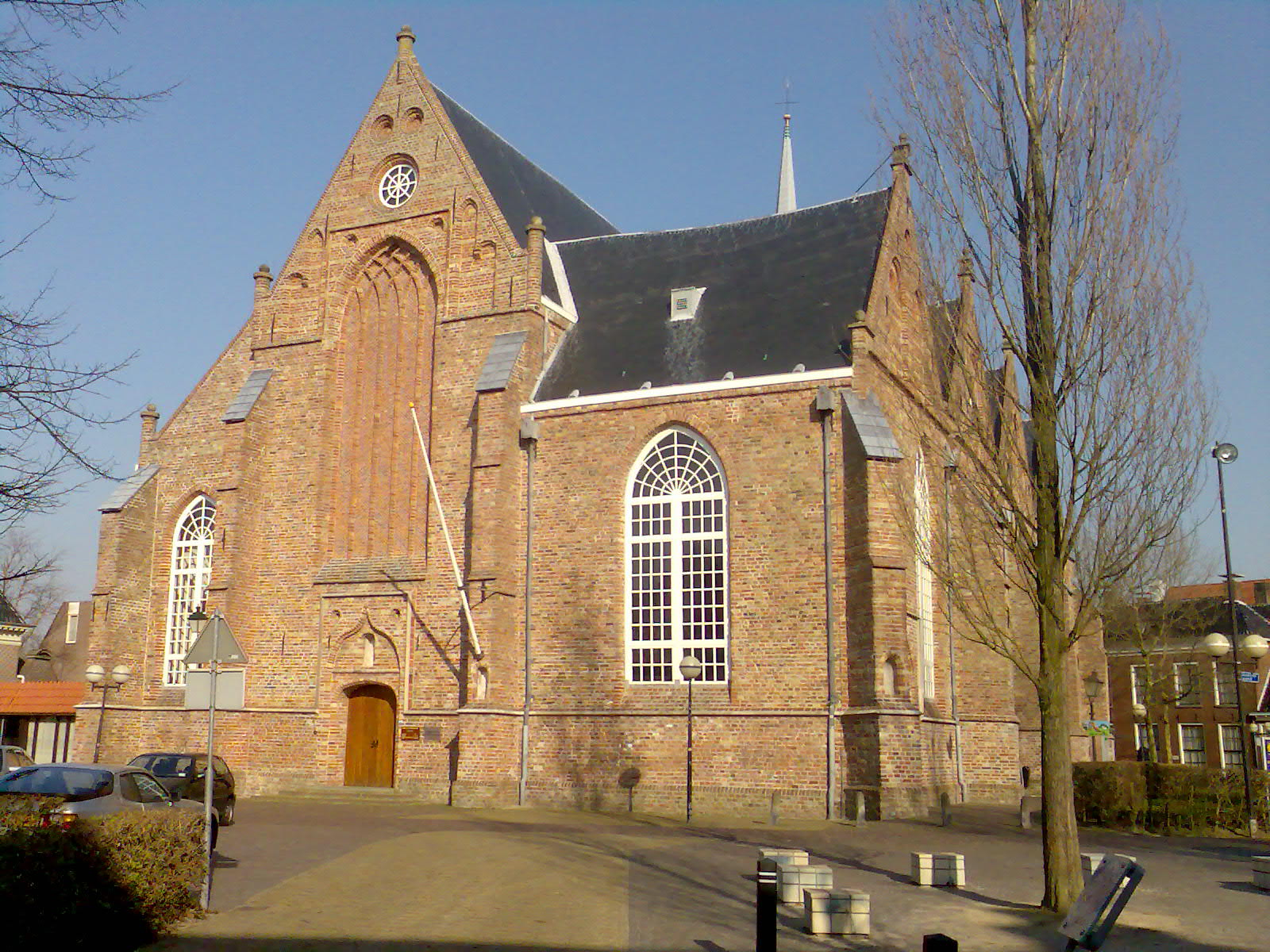
- Grote or Jacobijnerkerk

Religion
- Sect: Protestant Church in the Netherlands

Location
- Location: Jacobijnerkerkhof 95, Leeuwarden, Netherlands
- Interactive map of Grote Kerk or Jacobijnerkerk
- Coordinates: 53.20417°N 5.797445°E

Architecture
- Type: Church
- Style: Gothic
- Groundbreaking: 1275
- Completed: 1310

Website
- grotekerkleeuwarden.nl

Grote Kerk or Jacobijnerkerk (transl. Great, or Jacobin Church) is a Protestant church in the city of Leeuwarden, Netherlands. The square surrounding the church is the Jacobijnerkerkhof.

== History ==
The church was built in the 13th century. The building was originally part of the Dominican (Jacobin) monastery founded in 1245. It is Leeuwarden's oldest building. In 1256 the famous theologian Albertus Magnus visited the monastery and preached in the church. In 1392 the building was damaged by a fire. It was restored in 1394. An aisle was added in 1504. The church was extended to the west with a bay that was completed in 1521. There was a major restoration in the years 1971-1976. In 1972 remnants of murals appeared. These murals were completed in 1575 and over-painted in 1578 during the Reformation. The Diet in the church on 17 April 1581 was requested by William the Silent. A memorial was unveiled by Arno Brok on 17 April 2018. It is a bronze relief by sculptor Eric Claus.

== Interior ==
=== Organs ===
The main organ (three manuals, 37 stops) of the Grote Kerk is one of the most beautiful sounding baroque organs of the Netherlands. It was built by the Amsterdam organ builder Christian Müller in 1727. The choir organ was built in 1977 by Vermeulen and a third organ was built by Metzler Orgelbau.

There were concerts in the church by the famous organists Camille Saint-Saëns in 1897 and Albert Schweitzer in 1932.

=== People buried in the royal crypt ===
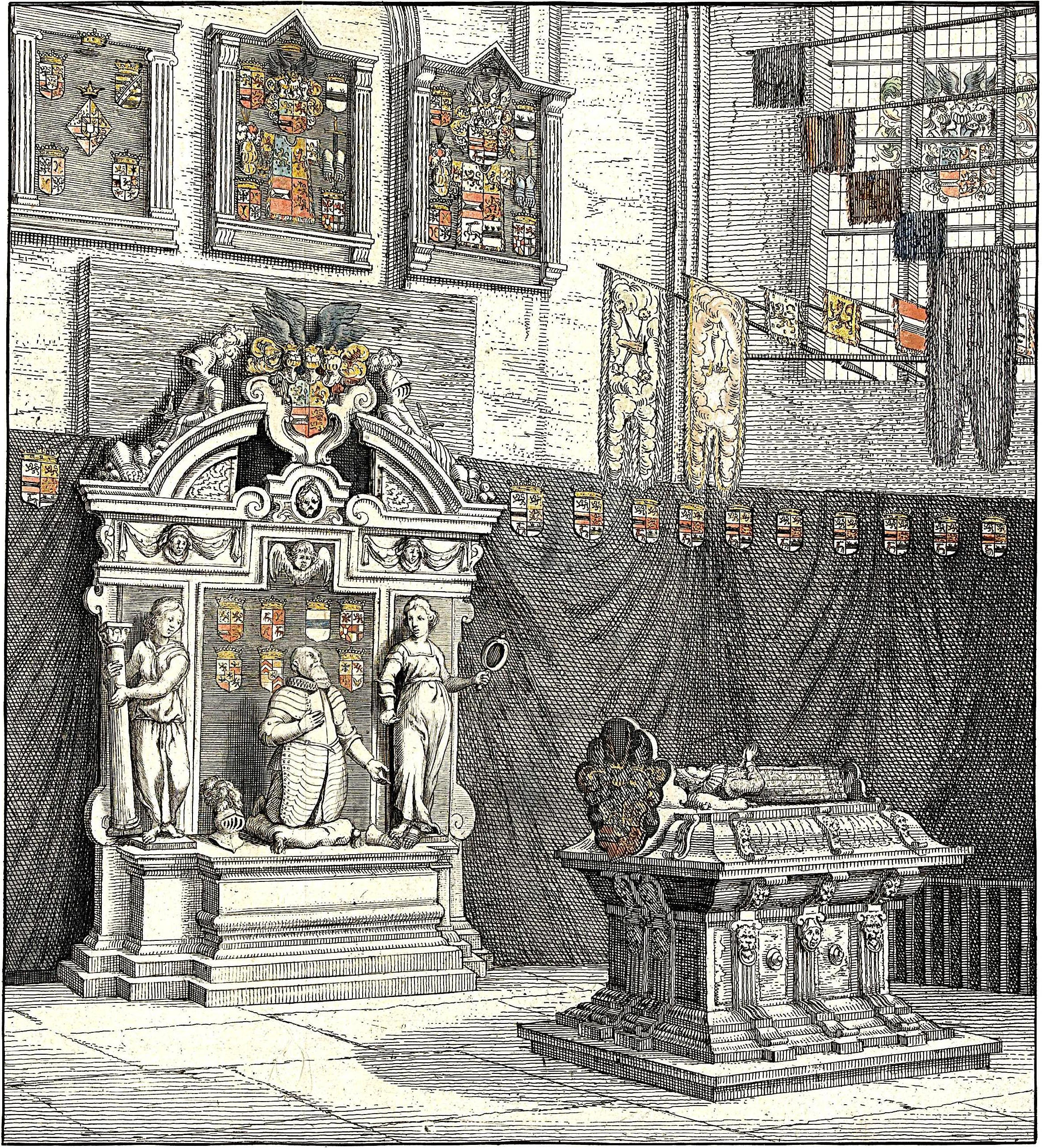
Monument of William Louis in 1634

Members of the Frisian Nassaus were entombed in the royal crypt in the choir of the church. With Delft and Breda, Leeuwarden is one of the three cities in the Netherlands with a royal crypt.

- Countess Anna of Nassau (1588)
- William Louis, Count of Nassau-Dillenburg (1620)
- Ernest Casimir I, Count of Nassau-Dietz (1632)
- Henry Casimir I of Nassau-Dietz (1640)
- Sophia Hedwig of Brunswick-Lüneburg (1642)
- William Frederick, Prince of Nassau-Dietz (1664)
- Countess Albertine Agnes of Nassau (1696)
- Henry Casimir II, Prince of Nassau-Dietz (1696)
- Landgravine Marie Louise of Hesse-Kassel (1765)

In 1795, during the Batavian Revolution, the graves were destroyed. The fiftieth anniversary of Queen Wilhelmina's reign in 1948 prompted the rehabilitation of the stadtholder's burial space.

=== Stained glass windows ===
A number of stained glass windows were installed in the choir. Three of them refer to the period of the Frisian Nassaus and were made by Cor Reisma in 1957. The rightmost window was designed by artist Dick Osinga and made by Willem Bogtman in 1963. This is the "Wilhelmina window" and represents the resurrection of the Dutch people from World War II and the reconstruction. Under this window a plaque was placed in 2005 in memory of Queen Juliana. During the restoration in the period 1972-1978 two more windows were added. These were made by Jos de Ridder. The window on the left is the "William Louis window". The "Marie Louise window" is placed on the right.

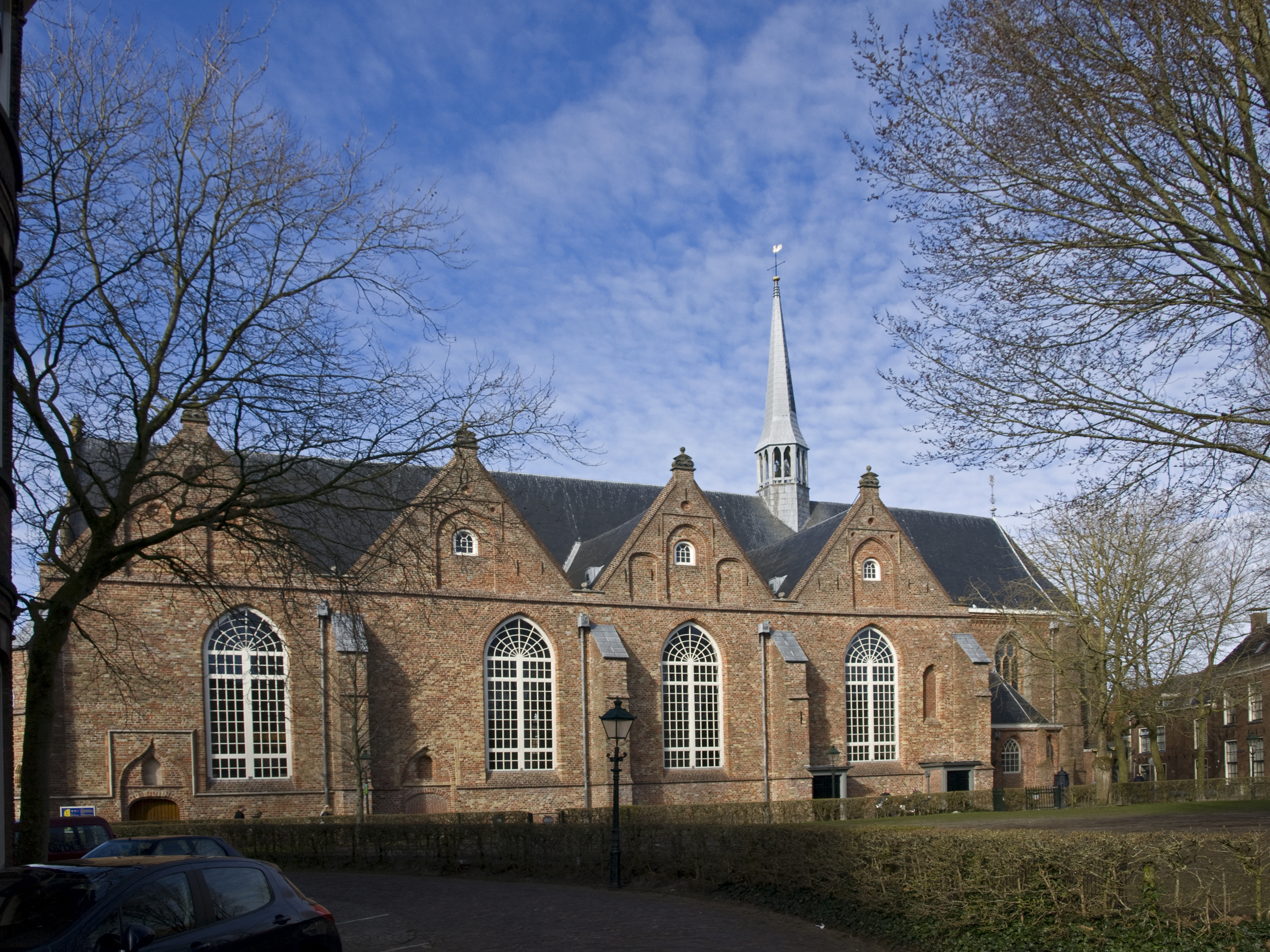
Grote Kerk

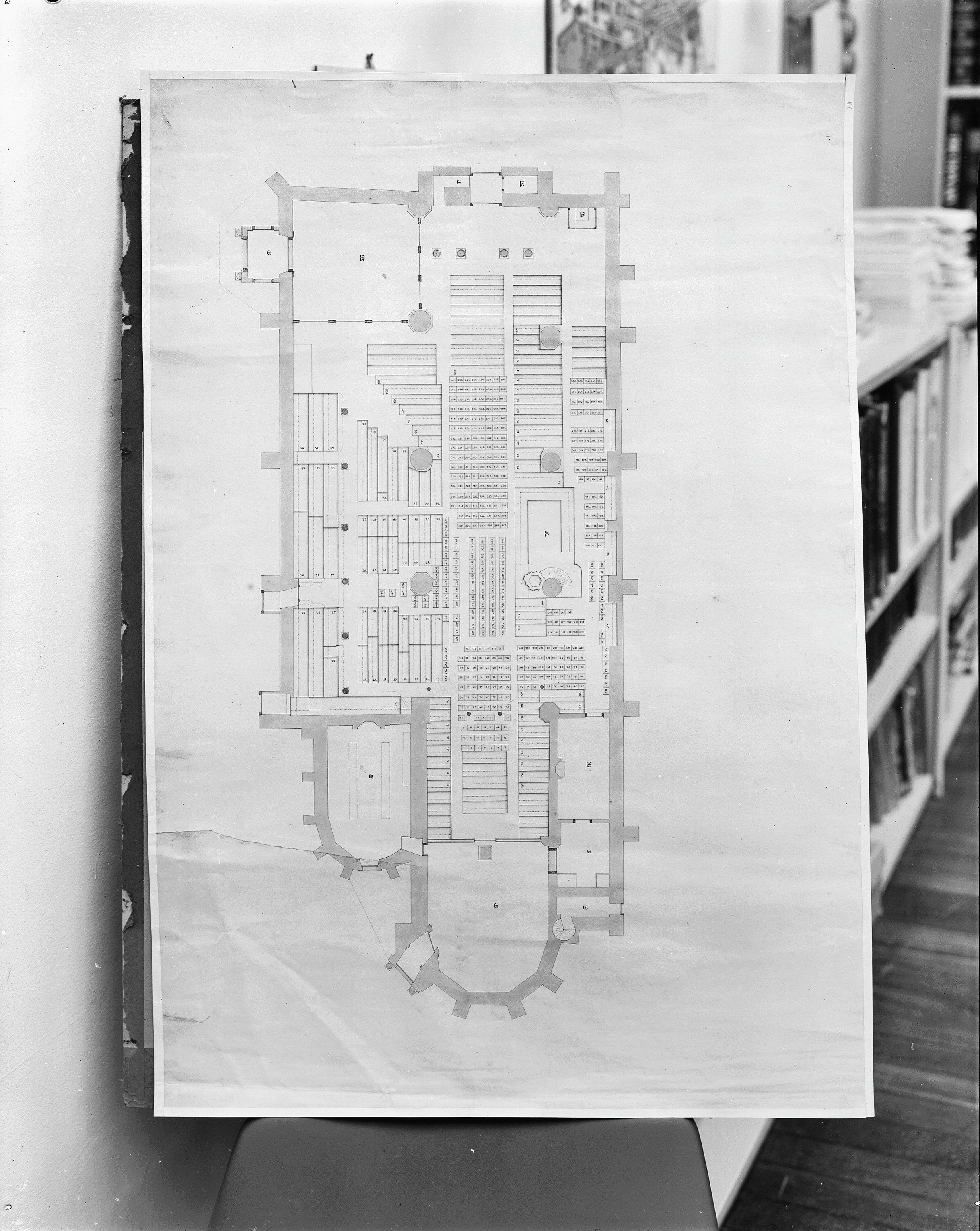
Church plan

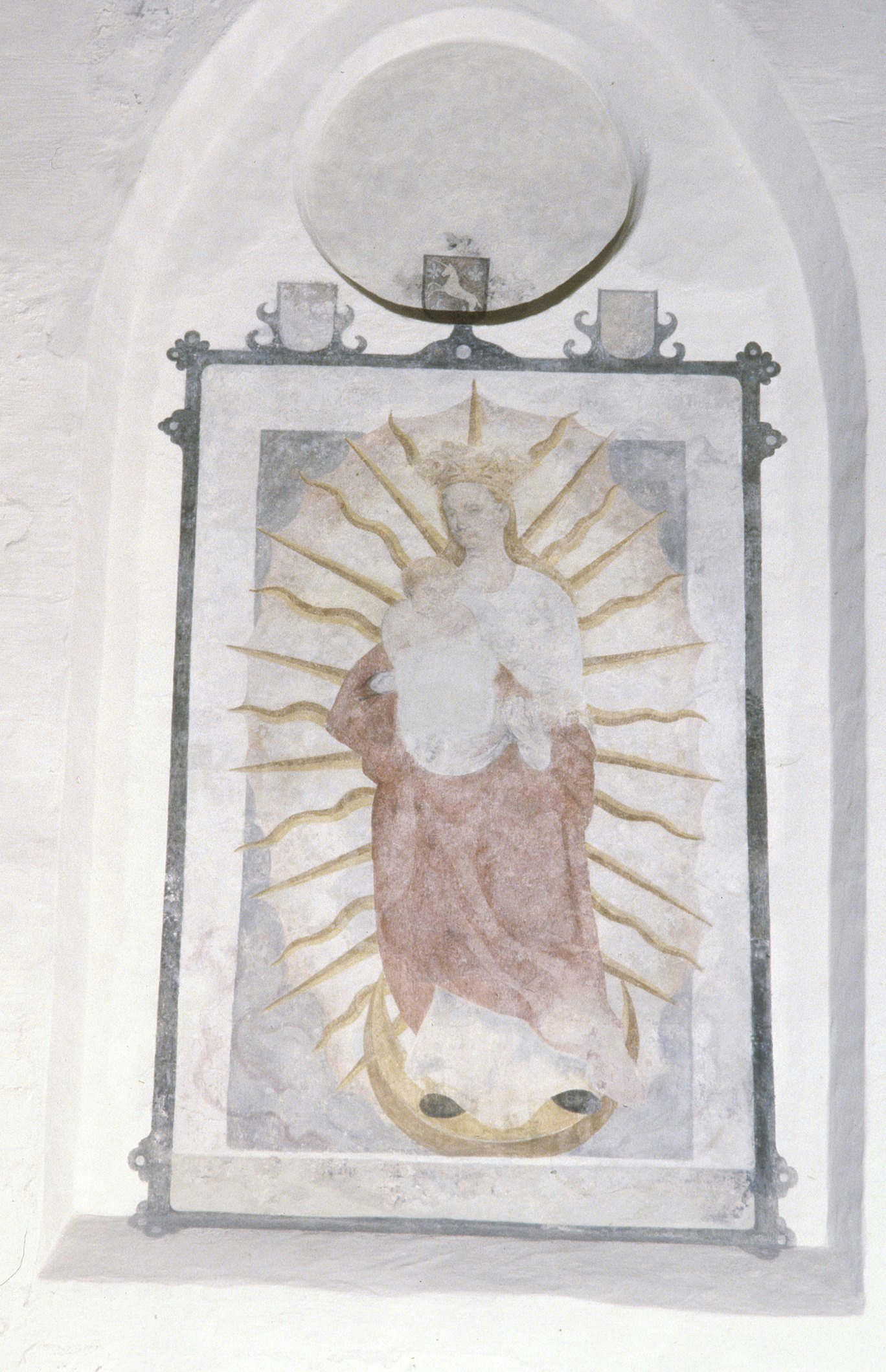
Murals

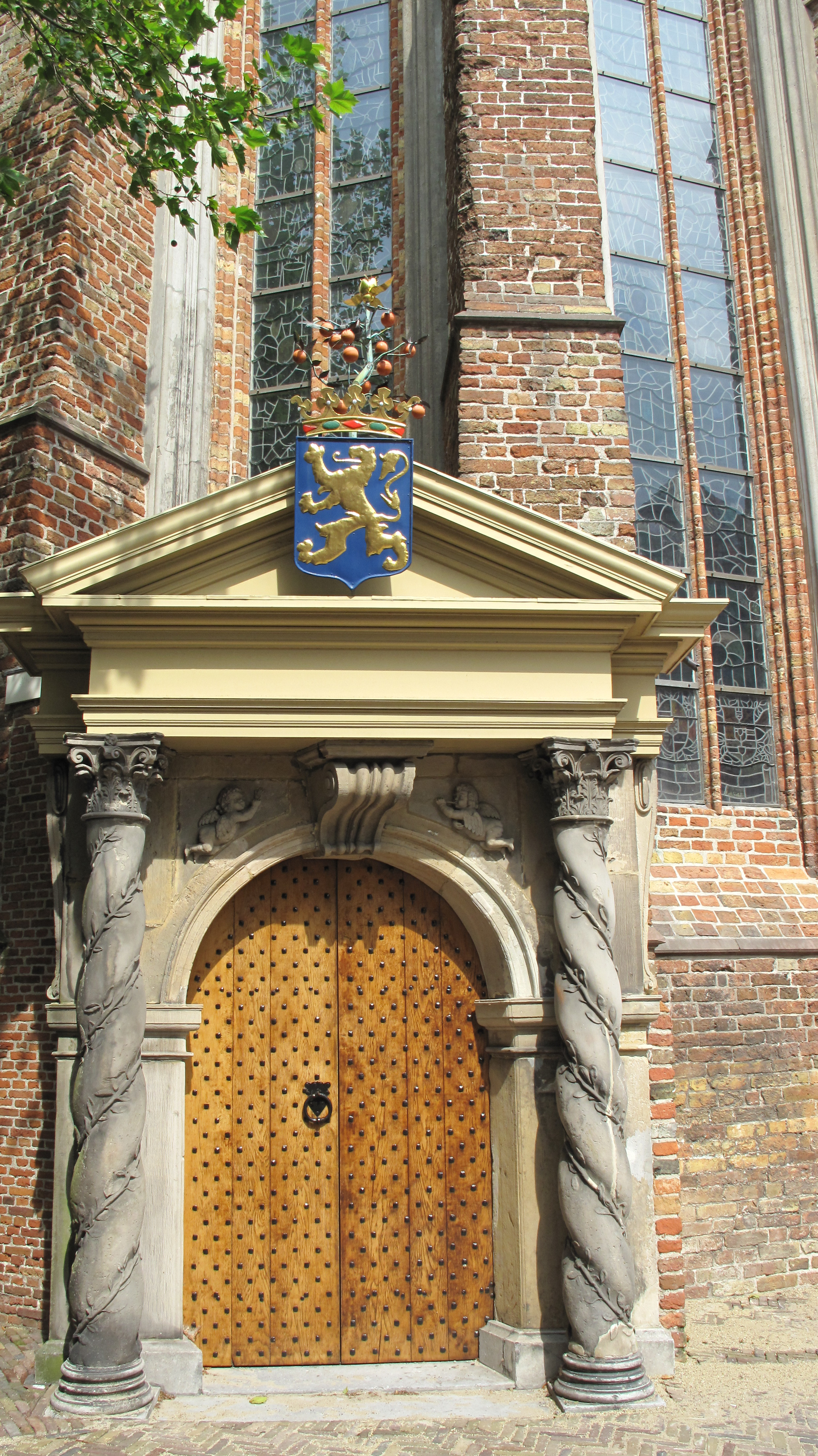
Orange Gate

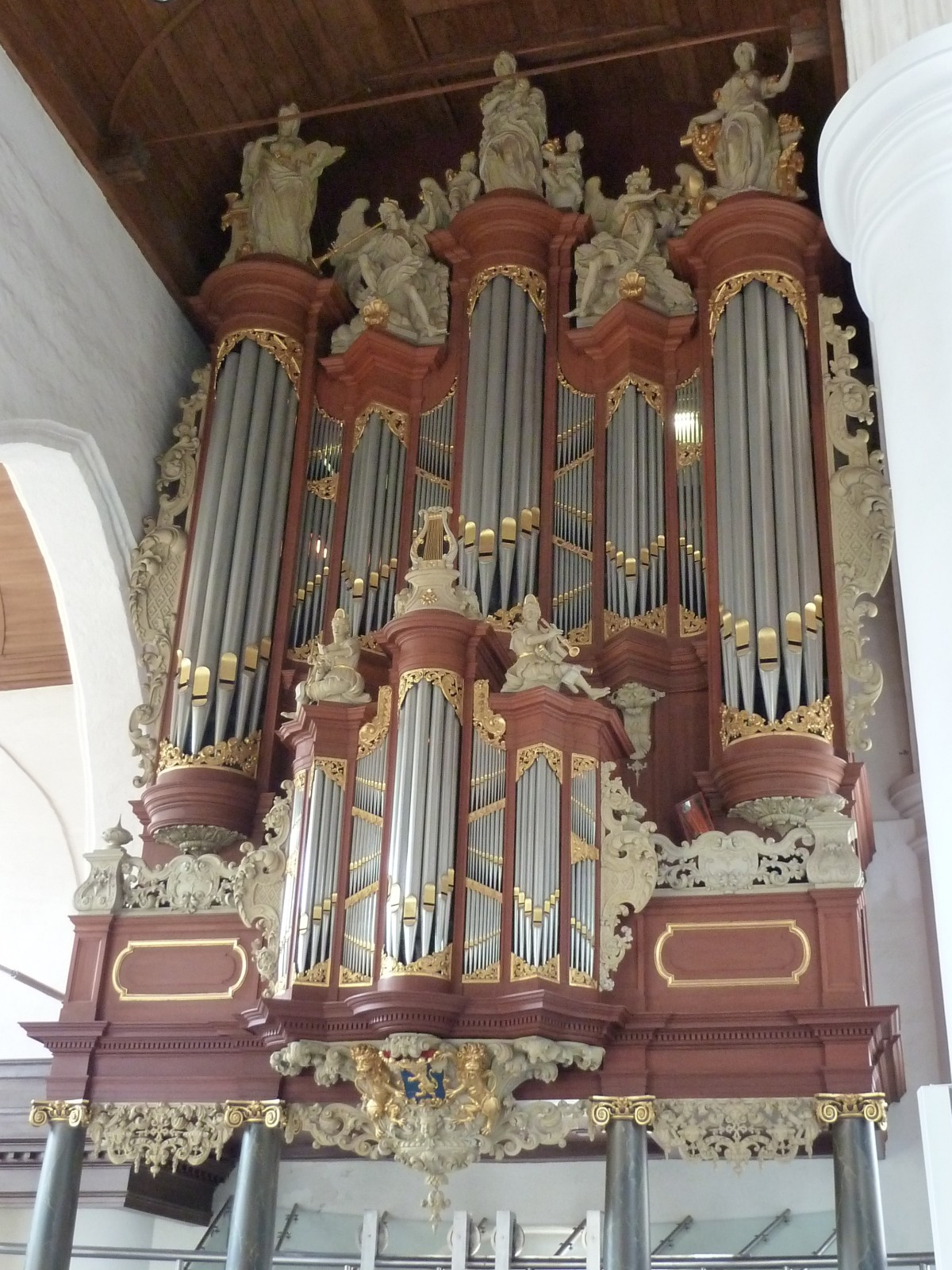
Christian Müller organ

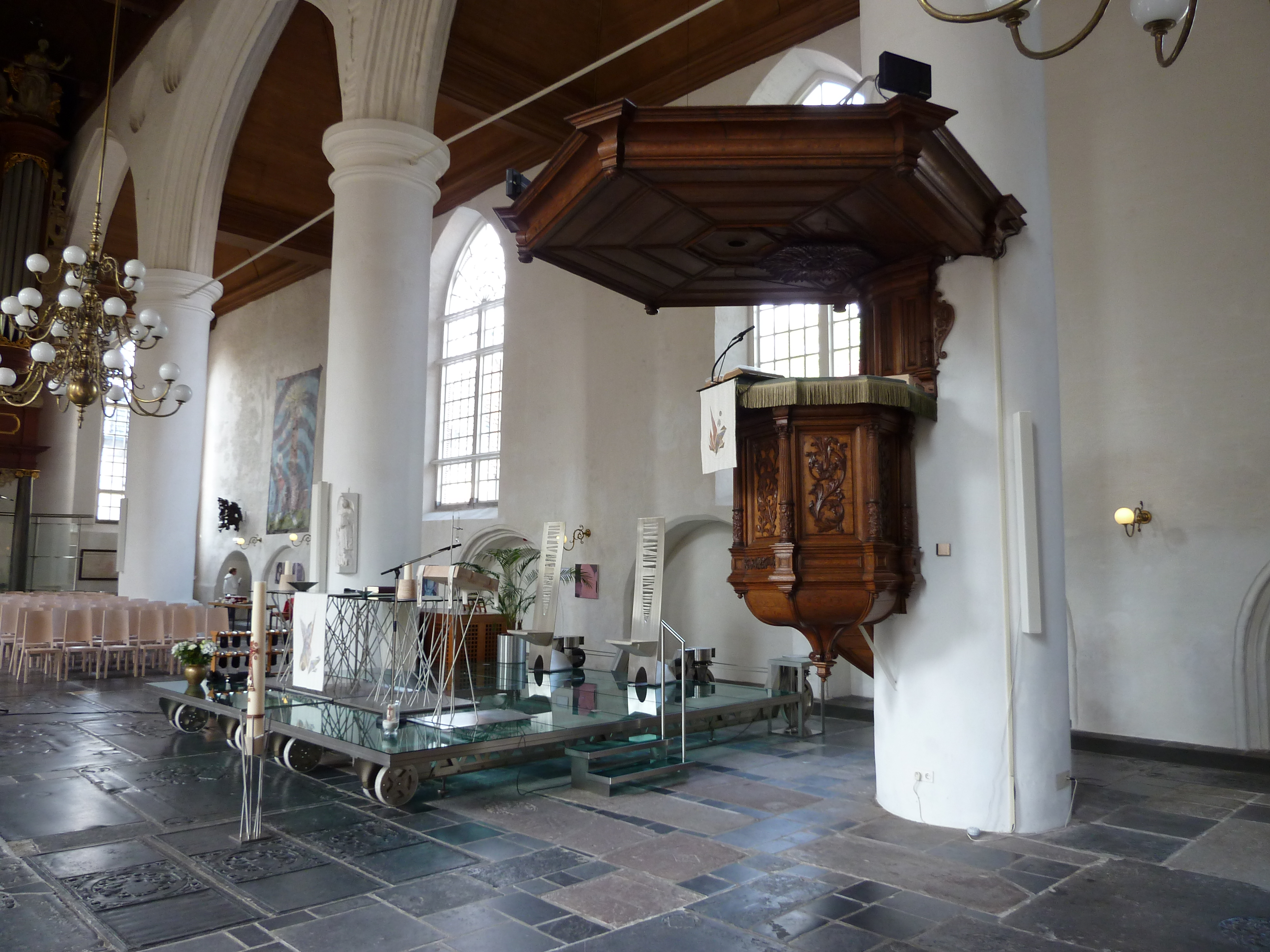
Pulpit

== Sources ==
- Bernhard van Haersma Buma (2008), Grote of Jacobijnerkerk te Leeuwarden, Leeuwarden, Friese Pers Boekerij, ISBN 9789033006487
