= Prince William Henry (disambiguation) =

Prince William Henry, Duke of Gloucester and Edinburgh (1743–1805) was the younger brother of King George III.

Prince William Henry may also refer to:

- William III of England (1650–1702), baptised William Henry
- Prince William Henry of Nassau-Usingen (1684–1718)
- Prince William, Duke of Gloucester (1689–1700), baptised William Henry
- William IV (1765–1837), baptised William Henry
- Prince William of Gloucester (1941–1972), baptised William Henry
