= Kronprinz Wilhelm =

Kronprinz Wilhelm may refer to:

- William, German Crown Prince (1882–1951), last crown prince of the German Empire
- SS Kronprinz Wilhelm, an auxiliary cruiser converted from a civilian liner in 1914, surrendered to the United States in 1915
- SMS Kronprinz, a König-class battleship, renamed as Kronprinz Wilhelm in 1918
