= Wilhelmine of Prussia =

Wilhelmine of Prussia, Wilhelmine von Preußen in German, may refer to:

- Wilhelmine of Prussia, Margravine of Brandenburg-Bayreuth (1709–1758), Margravine of Bayreuth, eldest daughter of Frederick William I of Prussia and sister of Frederick II of Prussia
- Wilhelmina of Prussia, Princess of Orange (1751–1820), daughter of Prince August Wilhelm of Prussia; niece of previous
- Wilhelmine of Prussia, Queen of the Netherlands (1774–1837), daughter of Frederick William II of Prussia and wife of William I of the Netherlands; niece of previous
