= Prince William Louis of Baden =

German prince (1732–1788)

William Louis of Baden-Durlach
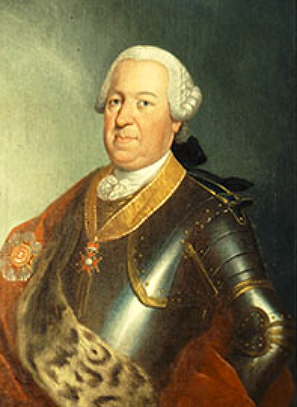
- Presumed portrait of William Louis, 18th century
- Born: 14 January 1732
- Died: 17 December 1788 (aged 56)
- Title: Prince of Baden
- Spouse: Wilhelmine Christine Schortmann
- Parents: Friedrich von Baden-Durlach (father); Amalia of Nassau-Dietz (mother)

William Louis of Baden-Durlach (14 January 1732 – 17 December 1788) was the brother of the first Grand Duke of Baden, Charles Frederick. In 1753, he became governor of the province of Gelderland based in Arnhem. In 1766, he was appointed by the Netherlands States-General to lieutenant general. After 1769, William Louis was also active as an industrialist.

== Life ==
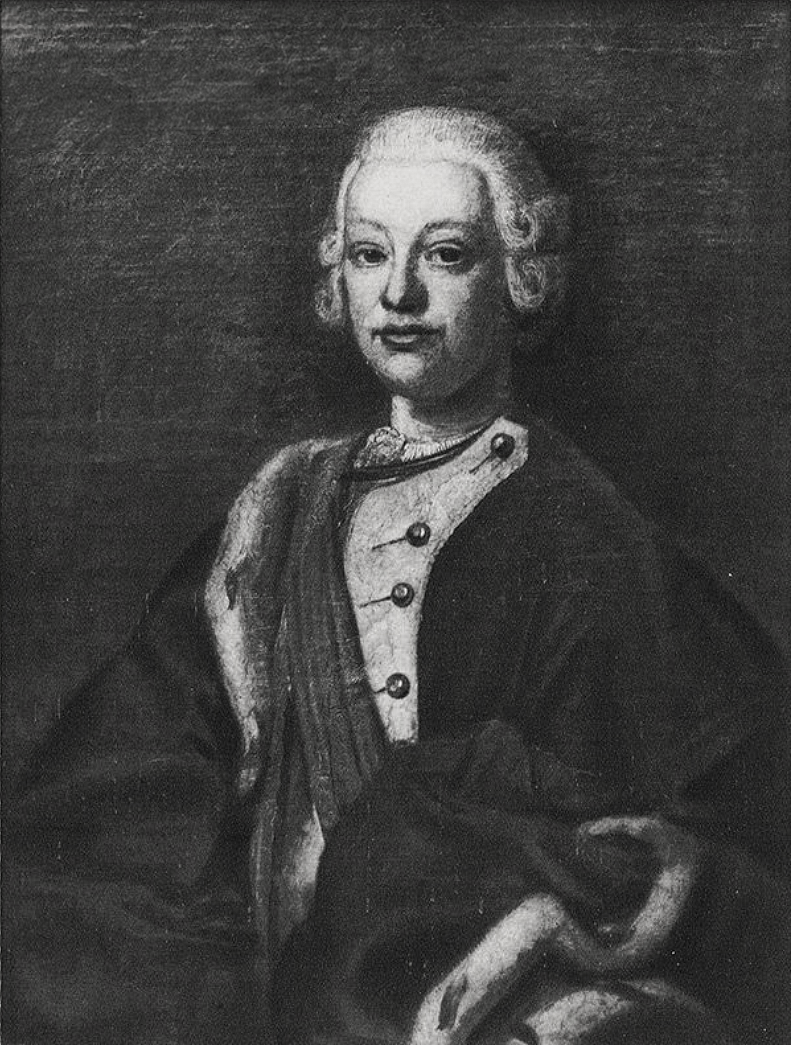
Portrait of William Louis, mid-18th century

William Louis was the son of Prince Friedrich von Baden-Durlach and Amalia of Nassau-Dietz, the daughter of Prince John William Friso of Nassau-Dietz-Orange.

After his father died in 1732 and his mother was suffering from a mental illness, his grandmother, Countess Magdalena Wilhelmine of Württemberg, took care of the education of William Louis and his brother Charles Frederick.

William Louis received his higher education at the Académie de Lausanne from 1743 to 1745. In 1745 and 1746 he traveled to Paris and the Netherlands, where he stayed with his uncle William IV of Orange, the later stadtholder of the Republic of the Seven United Provinces.

His uncle came to the conclusion that the undisciplined William Louis exerted a bad influence on his older brother, the Hereditary Prince Charles Frederick. When Charles Frederick took the journey home to Karlsruhe in order to take over the government, his uncle ordered William Louis to pursue a military career in the Netherlands.

With permission of the Margrave Charles Frederick, William Louis married Wilhelmine Christine Schortmann morganatically. The children from this union were ennobled on January 27, 1777, by Charles Frederick. They were created barons of Seldeneck call and allowed to use the Seldeneck arms. The original Seldenecks were a Frankish noble family already extinct in 1583. The son, Wilhelm Ludwig von Seldeneck. (Born January 14, 1766; † January 10, 1827) is considered the common ancestor of all Seldenecks.

William Louis bought land in Mühlburg and in 1769 he founded a dye plant, which was converted in 1770 into a Brewery and from 1771 also produced brandy. This was the nucleus of the baronial Seldeneck brewery that existed until 1921.
