= Henriette Amalie of Anhalt-Dessau (1666–1726) =

Henriëtte Amalia of Anhalt-Dessau
- Princess consort of Nassau-Dietz
- Born: 16 August 1666; Kleve
- Died: 18 April 1726 (aged 59); Diez an der Lahn
- Spouse: Henry Casimir II, Prince of Nassau-Dietz (m. 1683; died 1696)
- Issue Detail: Henriette Albertine; John William Friso, Prince of Orange; Maria Amalia; Sofia Hedwig; Isabelle Charlotte, Princess of Nassau-Dillenburg; Johanna Agnes; Louise Leopoldina; Henriette Casimira
Names
- Henriëtte Amalia Maria
- House: Ascania
- Father: John George II, Prince of Anhalt-Dessau
- Mother: Henriette Catherine of Nassau

Henriëtte Amalia Maria von Anhalt-Dessau (Kleve, 16 August 1666 – Dietz an der Lahn, 18 April 1726) was a Princess consort of Nassau-Dietz.

== Early life and ancestry ==
She was the daughter of John George II, Prince of Anhalt-Dessau, and Henriëtte Catharina of Nassau and the granddaughter of Frederick Henry, Prince of Orange.

== Marriage and issue ==
She married her cousin Henry Casimir II, Prince of Nassau-Dietz, in 1683, at the age of 17. When Henry Casimir died in 1696, she became regent for their son, John William Friso, who succeeded to his father's titles. Henriëtte Amalia von Anhalt-Dessau died in 1726 at the age of 59; she was buried in Dietz.

Hendrik Casimir II and Henriëtte Amalia had nine children:

- William George Friso (1685–1686)
- John William Friso (1687–1711), married Marie Louise of Hesse-Kassel
- Henriëtte Albertine (1686–1754)
- Maria Amalia (1689–1771)
- Sophia Hedwig (1690–1734), married Karl Leopold, Duke of Mecklenburg-Schwerin (26 September 1678 – 28 November 1747) on 27 May 1709 (div. 1710)
- Isabella Charlotte (1692–1757), married Christian, Prince of Nassau-Dillenburg (1688–1739)
- Johanna Agnes (1693–1765)
- Louise Leopoldina (1695–1758)
- Henriëtte Casimira (1696–1738)

== Ancestry ==
Ancestors of Henriette Amalie of Anhalt-Dessau (1666–1726)

8. John George I, Prince of Anhalt-Dessau
4. John Casimir, Prince of Anhalt-Dessau
9. Dorothea of Simmern
2. John George II, Prince of Anhalt-Dessau
10. Maurice, Landgrave of Hesse-Kassel
5. Agnes of Hesse-Kassel
11. Juliane of Nassau-Siegen
1. Henriette Amalia of Anhalt-Dessau
12. William the Silent
6. Frederick Henry, Prince of Orange
13. Louise de Coligny
3. Henriette Catherine of Nassau
14. Johan Albrecht I of Solms-Braunfels
7. Amalia of Solms-Braunfels
15. Agnes of Sayn-Wittgenstein
