= Henry Casimir II of Nassau-Dietz =

Stadtholder of Friesland and Groningen from 1664 to 1696

Henry Casimir II
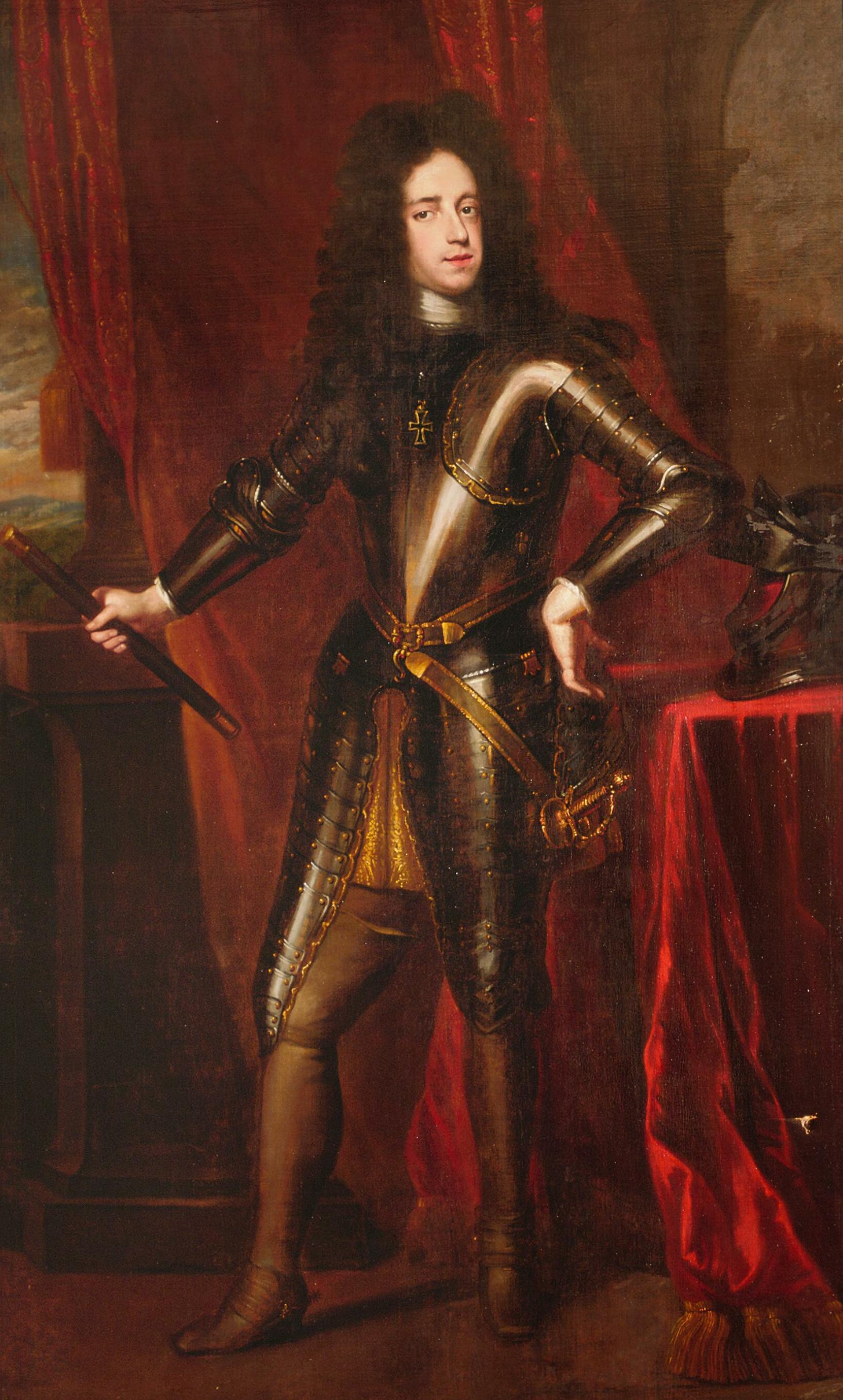
- Henry Casimir II by Lancelot Volders

Stadtholder of Friesland and Groningen
- Reign: 31 October 1664 – 25 March 1696
- Predecessor: William Frederick, Prince of Nassau-Dietz
- Successor: John William Friso, Prince of Orange

Prince of Nassau-Dietz
- Reign: 31 October 1664 – 25 March 1696
- Predecessor: William Frederick, Prince of Nassau-Dietz
- Successor: John William Friso, Prince of Orange
- Born: 18 January 1657; The Hague
- Died: 25 March 1696 (aged 39); Leeuwarden
- Burial: Grote or Jacobijnerkerk in Leeuwarden
- Spouse: Henriëtte Amalia of Anhalt-Dessau (m. 1683)
- Issue Detail: Henriette Albertine; John William Friso, Prince of Orange; Maria Amalia; Sofia Hedwig; Isabelle Charlotte, Princess of Nassau-Dillenburg; Johanna Agnes; Louise Leopoldina; Henriette Casimira
- House: Orange-Nassau
- Father: William Frederick, Prince of Nassau-Dietz
- Mother: Albertine Agnes of Nassau

Military service
- Conflicts: See list: Franco-Dutch War; Battle of Seneffe; Siege of Grave; Nine Years' War; Battle of Fleurus; Battle of Steenkerque; Battle of Landen

Henry Casimir II of Nassau-Dietz (Dutch: Hendrik Casimir II van Nassau-Dietz; 18 January 1657 – 25 March 1696) was Stadtholder of Friesland and Groningen from 1664 until his death in 1696.

== Life ==
Henry Casimir II of Nassau-Dietz was born in The Hague, the eldest son of Willem Frederik of Nassau-Dietz and Countess Albertine Agnes of Nassau, daughter of Frederick Henry, Prince of Orange, stadtholder of Holland, Zeeland, Utrecht, Guelders, and Overijssel. When his father, a member of the branch of Nassau-Dietz, died on October 31, 1664, he was made stadtholder of Friesland and Groningen (under guardianship of his mother as he was then seven years old). In 1675, Friesland voted to make its stadtholdership hereditary in the house of Nassau-Dietz. Hendrik Casimir II was therefore the first hereditary Friesian stadtholder. In 1683, he married his cousin Henriëtte Amalia of Anhalt-Dessau, daughter of John George II, Prince of Anhalt-Dessau. Hendrik Casimir died in Leeuwarden, and was succeeded as stadtholder by his son Johan Willem Friso of Orange-Nassau.

== Issue ==
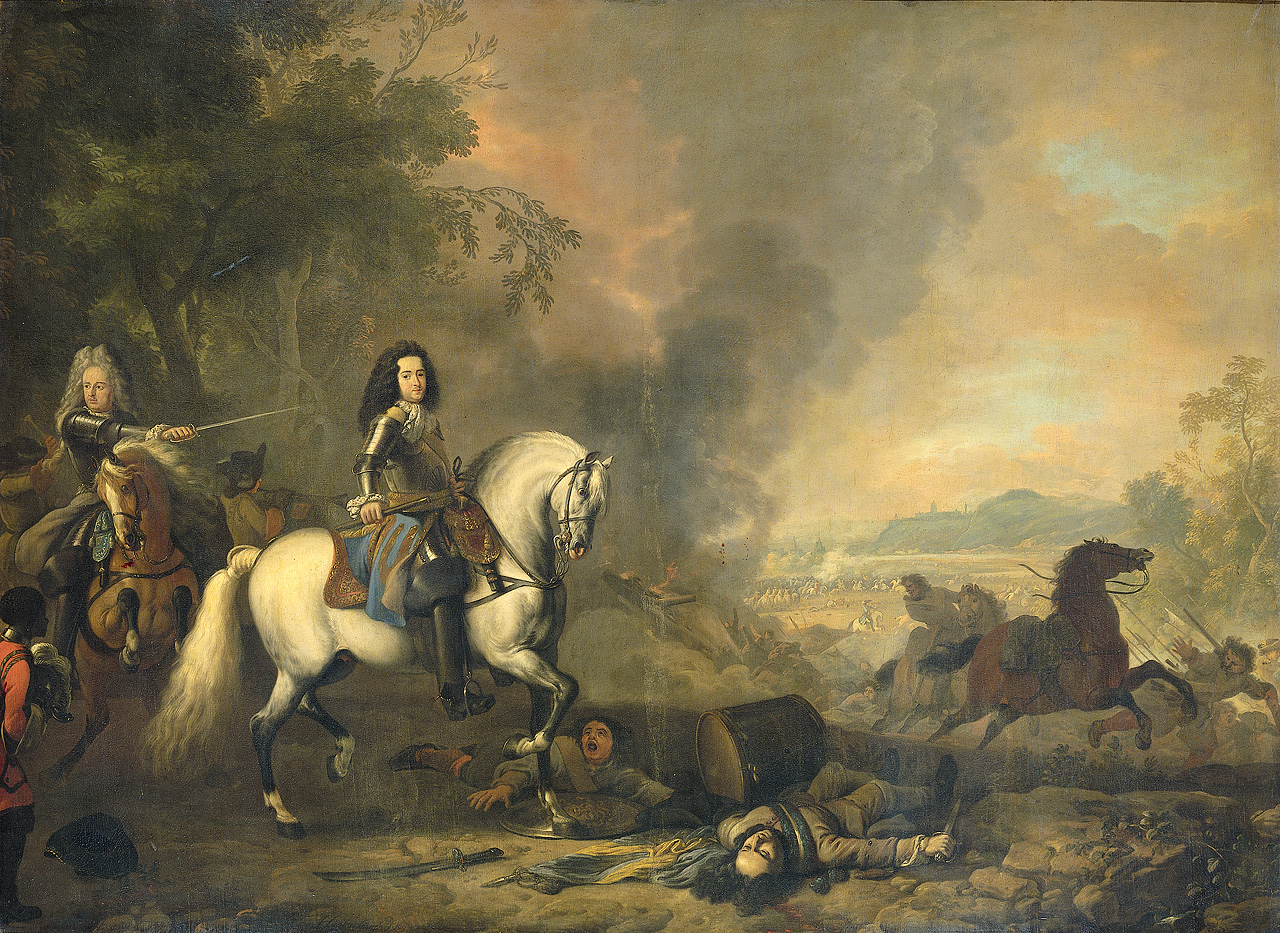
Henry Casimir II

From his marriage, Henry Casimir II had the following children:

- Willem George Friso (1685–1686), Hereditary Prince of Nassau-Dietz
- Henriette Albertine (1686–1754), Princess of Nassau-Dietz
- Johan Willem Friso (1687–1711), Stadholder in Friesland and Groningen
- Maria Amalia (1689–1771) Princess of Nassau-Dietz
- Sofia Hedwig (1690–1734), married in 1708 Duke Charles Leopold of Mecklenburg (1678–1747), son of Frederick, Duke of Mecklenburg-Grabow
- Isabelle Charlotte (1692–1757), married in 1725 Prince Christian, Prince of Nassau-Dillenburg (1688–1739), son of Henry, Prince of Nassau-Dillenburg
- Johanna Agnes (1693–1765), Princess of Nassau-Dietz
- Louise Leopoldina (1695–1758), Princess of Nassau-Dietz
- Henriette Casimira (1696–1738), Princess of Nassau-Dietz

== Ancestors ==
Ancestors of Henry Casimir II of Nassau-Dietz

8. John VI, Count of Nassau-Dillenburg
4. Ernest Casimir, Count of Nassau-Dietz
9. Countess Elisabeth of Leuchtenberg
2. William Frederick, Prince of Nassau-Dietz
10. Henry Julius, Duke of Brunswick-Lüneburg
5. Sophia Hedwig of Brunswick-Lüneburg
11. Elizabeth of Denmark
1. Henry Casimir II, Prince of Nassau-Dietz
12. William the Silent
6. Frederick Henry, Prince of Orange
13. Louise de Coligny
3. Countess Albertine Agnes of Nassau
14. John Albert I, Count of Solms-Braunfels
7. Amalia of Solms-Braunfels
15. Agnes of Sayn-Wittgenstein

Henry Casimir II of Nassau-Dietz House of Nassau Born: 18 January 1657 Died: 25 March 1696
Regnal titles
Preceded by William Frederick	Prince of Nassau-Dietz; 1664–1696	Succeeded by John William Friso
Political offices
Preceded by William Frederick	Stadholder of Friesland and Groningen; 1664–1696	Succeeded by John William Friso
