= List of people with given name William =

This is a list of notable people named William.

== Royalty and nobility ==
Ordered chronologically

=== British ===
- William the Conqueror (c. 1028–1087) First Norman King of England, Duke of Normandy
- William II of England (c.1057-1100) King of England
- William III of England (1650–1702) King of England, Scotland and Ireland, Stadtholder of Holland, Zeeland, Utrecht, Guelders, and Overijssel
- William IV (1765–1837) King of the United Kingdom and Hanover
- William I of Scotland (c. 1142–1214), a.k.a. William the Lion
- William Marshal, 1st Earl of Pembroke (1146/7–1219), Anglo-Norman soldier and statesman

=== Cameroonian ===
- William I of Bimbia, 19th-century king of the Isubu people
- William II of Bimbia (died 1882), king of the Isubu people

=== Dutch ===
- William I, Count of Holland (1167–1222), Count of Holland
- William II of Holland (1228–1256), also King of Germany
- William I, Prince of Orange (1533–1584), a.k.a. William the Silent
- William II, Prince of Orange (1626–1650), stadtholder of the United Provinces of the Netherlands
- William III of Orange (1650–1702), also William III of England and William II of Scotland
- William IV, Prince of Orange (1711–1751), first hereditary Stadtholder of all the United Provinces
- William I of the Netherlands (1772–1843), Prince of Orange and the first King of the Netherlands and Grand Duke of Luxembourg
- William V, Prince of Orange (1748–1806), last Stadtholder of the Dutch Republic
- William II of the Netherlands (1792–1849), King of the Netherlands, Grand Duke of Luxembourg, and Duke of Limburg
- William III of the Netherlands (1817–1890), King of the Netherlands, Grand Duke of Luxembourg, and Duke of Limburg

=== French ===
- William of Gellone (c. 755–812 or 814), Count of Toulouse, canonized a saint
- William Longsword (r. 927–942), second Duke of Normandy
- William XI, Count of Auvergne
- William XII, Count of Auvergne (1300–1332), Count of Auvergne from 1325 to 1332

=== German ===
- William I, German Emperor, (1797–1888), Emperor of Germany and King of Prussia
- Wilhelm II, German Emperor (1859–1941), Emperor of Germany and King of Prussia

=== Sicilian ===
- William I of Sicily (1131–1166), a.k.a. William the Bad or William the Wicked
- William II of Sicily (1155–1189), a.k.a. William the Good
- William III of Sicily (1190–1198), last Norman King of Sicily, reigning briefly for ten months in 1194

=== Other ===
- William I, multiple royals and nobles
- William II, multiple royals and nobles
  - William II of Villehardouin (died 1278), Prince of Achaea
- William III, multiple royals and nobles
- William IV (disambiguation), multiple royals and nobles
- William V, multiple royals and nobles
- William VI, multiple royals and nobles
- William VII, multiple royals and nobles
- William VIII, multiple royals and nobles
- William IX, multiple royals and nobles
- William X, multiple royals and nobles
- William, Grand Duke of Luxembourg (disambiguation)
- William of Werle (died 1436/94-1436), Lord of Werle-Güstrow
- William, Prince of Albania (1876–1945), from March to September 1914

== Pre-modern era commoners ==
Ordered chronologically

=== British ===
- William (bishop of the Isles) (died 1095), bishop of what later became the Diocese of the Isles
- William de Corbeil (c. 1070–1136), Archbishop of Canterbury
- William of Malmesbury (died 1143), English historian and monk
- William of Tyre (c. 1130–1185), Archbishop of Tyre, chronicler of the Crusades
- William of Norwich (c. 1132–1144), saint and martyr
- William of York (died 1154), Archbishop of York and saint
- William (bishop of Moray) (died 1162), Roman Catholic bishop in Scotland
- William the Trouvère (fl. 1150–1200), English Anglo-Norman poet and translator
- William of Ramsey (fl. 1219), English monk and hagiographer
- William (bishop of Dunblane) (died early 1290s), Tironensian abbot and bishop in the Kingdom of Scotland
- William Wallace (c. 1270–1305), Scottish general and one of the main leaders during the Wars of Scottish Independence
- William of Ockham (1287–1347), English friar and philosopher, originator of Occam's Razor
- William of Wykeham (1320–1404), Bishop of Winchester, founder of Winchester College and New College, Oxford
- William Caxton (c. 1422–c. 1491), English merchant, diplomat and writer, thought to be the first person to introduce a printing press into England
- William Branthwaite (1563–1619), English scholar and translator
- William Shakespeare (c. 23 April 1564 – 23 April 1616), English playwright, poet, and actor. Widely regarded as the most influential English writer of all time.

=== French ===
- William of Poitiers (c. 1020–1090), Norman chronicler, chaplain to William the Conqueror
- William de St-Calais (died 1096), Norman abbot, Bishop of Durham
- William (bishop of Orange) (died 1098), took part in the First Crusade
- William of Champeaux (1070–1121), French philosopher and theologian
- William of Conches (c. 1090–c. 1154), French scholastic philosopher, tutor of Henry II of England
- William of Donjeon (c. 1155–1209), a.k.a. St. William of Bourges and St. William the Confessor, French archbishop
- William the Clerk (fl. c. 1200–c. 1240), Old French poet, writer of the Roman de Fergus
- William the Clerk of Normandy (fl. 1210/1211–1227/1238), Norman cleric and Old French poet
- William of Auxerre (died 1231), French theologian

=== Other ===
- William (March of Pannonia) (died 871), Margrave in the Carolingian Empire
- William (archbishop of Mainz) (929–968), German bishop, son of Emperor Otto the Great
- William of St-Thierry (died 1148), theologian and mystic, abbot of St. Thierry
- William of Moerbeke (1215–1286), Flemish bishop, translator of philosophical, medical, and scientific texts

== Modern era ==
=== Several people ===
- William Adams (disambiguation), multiple people
- William Aiton (disambiguation), multiple people
- William Andrews (disambiguation), multiple people
- William Arnaud (disambiguation), multiple people
- William Arnett (disambiguation), multiple people
- William Arnold (disambiguation), multiple people
- William Arnott (disambiguation), multiple people
- William Ash (disambiguation), multiple people
- William Barnett (disambiguation), multiple people
- William Barr (disambiguation), multiple people
- William Barry (disambiguation), multiple people
- William Bartram (disambiguation), multiple people
- William Beckett (disambiguation), multiple people
- William Bell (disambiguation), multiple people
- William Boyd (disambiguation), multiple people
- William Bridges (disambiguation), multiple people
- William Brydges (disambiguation), multiple people
- William Byrd (disambiguation), multiple people
- William Campbell (disambiguation), multiple people
- William Copeland (disambiguation), multiple people
- William Davis (disambiguation), multiple people
- William Douglas (disambiguation), multiple people
- William Duane (disambiguation), multiple people
- William Fuller (disambiguation), multiple people
- William Garnett (disambiguation), multiple people
- William Gay (disambiguation), multiple people
- William Hamilton (disambiguation), multiple people
- William Handy (disambiguation), multiple people
- William Harrison (disambiguation), multiple people
- William Hearst (disambiguation), multiple people
- William Hurst (disambiguation), multiple people
- William Jones (disambiguation), multiple people
- William Kelley (disambiguation), multiple people
- William King (disambiguation), multiple people
- William Lee (disambiguation), multiple people
- William Llewellyn (disambiguation), multiple people
- William Long (disambiguation), multiple people
- William Miller (disambiguation), multiple people
- William Monypenny (disambiguation), multiple people
- William Moses (disambiguation), multiple people
- William Mullins (disambiguation), multiple people
- William Price (disambiguation), multiple people
- William Prince (disambiguation), multiple people
- William Rice (disambiguation), multiple people
- William Richardson (disambiguation), multiple people
- William Rush (disambiguation), multiple people
- William Shaw (disambiguation), multiple people
- William Simpson (disambiguation), multiple people
- William Smith (disambiguation), multiple people
- William Swift (disambiguation), multiple people
- William Wallace (disambiguation), multiple people
- William Wales (disambiguation), multiple people
- William Wegman (disambiguation), multiple people
- William White (disambiguation), multiple people
- William Wolf (disambiguation), multiple people
- William Wolfe (disambiguation), multiple people
- William Wolff (disambiguation), multiple people
- William Wood (disambiguation), multiple people
- William Woods (disambiguation), multiple people
- William Wright (disambiguation), multiple people
- William Wyatt (disambiguation), multiple people

=== Others ===
- William Henry Aldis (1871–1948), English Protestant missionary
- Lt. William "Vasilios" "Bill" George Aliapoulos (1917–2008), American-born Greek engineer
- William "Jock" Alves (c. 1909–1979), Rhodesian physician and politician
- William Amaral de Andrade (born 1967), Brazilian football manager and former centre-back
- William Edward Atkinson (1946–2006), American Augustinian priest and educator
- William Ayache (born 1961), French footballer and manager
- William Ball (suffragist) (born 1862), British workers union member who supported women's suffrage
- William F. Barker (1823–1895), American merchant and politician
- William Barnes (born 1992), American musician and singer-songwriter known professionally as Will Toledo
- Bill Beagan (born 1937), Canadian ice hockey administrator
- William Beausire (disappeared 1975), British-Chilean commercial engineer
- William Sperry Beinecke (1914–2018), American philanthropist and businessman
- William Bianchini (born 1960), Luxembourgish football midfielder
- William Bradford Bishop (born 1936), U.S. foreign service officer
- William Blum (1933–2018), American author and foreign policy critic
- William Bonin (1947–1996), American serial killer and rapist
- William Bonner, Brazilian newscaster and journalist
- William H. Bonney, alias of American outlaw Billy the Kid
- William Bordy, American politician
- William Bradford (1946–2008), American murderer
- William M. Branham (1909–1965), American Christian preacher
- William A. Brewer III, American trial lawyer
- William Bridgeo, American politician
- Will Bruey, CEO of Varda Space Industries
- William Bushamuka (born 1996), Congolese tennis player
- William Buttress (1827-1866), English cricketer
- William Byron (racing driver), American NASCAR driver
- William Jennings Bryan (1860–1925), American orator and politician
- William Burke and William Hare (Burke 1792–1829; Hare unknown), Irish serial killers
- William Campbell-Taylor (born 1965), Anglican priest
- W. Sterling Cary (1927–2021), American Christian minister
- William Cassels (1858–1925), British Anglican missionary bishop
- William T. Cefalu, chief scientific and medical officer of the American Diabetes Association.
- Bill Clinton (born 1946), 42nd president of the United States
- William Cooper (1943–2001), American writer, radio host, and political activist
- William A. Conant (1816–1909), American merchant, politician, and railroad agent
- William Craft (1824–1900), American abolitionist and fugitive
- William Edward Crews (1932–2024), American politician
- William Crosfield (1838–1909), British politician
- William Dar (born 1953), Filipino horticulturist and government administrator
- Peduru Hewage William de Silva (1908–1988), Sri Lankan Sinhala Marxist politician
- William Herschel (1738–1822), German-born British Astronomer
- William De Vecchis (born 1971), Italian politician
- William DeVizia (born 1969), American actor
- William "Jack" Dempsey (1895–1983), Irish Native-American boxer and World Heavyweight Champion
- William J. Donovan (1883–1959), American soldier, lawyer, intelligence officer and diplomat
- William Dowell (1885–1949), Wales dual-code international rugby footballer
- William Duckworth (1943–2012), American composer, author, educator and internet pioneer
- William S. Edings (1857–1927), justice of the Territorial Supreme Court of Hawaii
- William Edward Rose (1813–1893), hotelier and state senator
- William Lukens Elkins (1832–1903), American businessman, inventor and art collector
- William N. Ethridge (1912–1971), chief justice of the Supreme Court of Mississippi
- Gilberto William Fabbro (born 1977), Brazilian football attacking midfielder
- William Faulkner (1897–1962), American writer
- William R. Federici (1917–2009), chief justice of the New Mexico Supreme Court
- William H. Folland (c. 1878–1941), associate justice of the Utah Supreme Court
- William Fox (1879–1952), founder of Fox Film Corporation
- William S. Friedman (1868–1944), American rabbi
- William Friel, American politician
- W. A. Fry (1872–1944), Canadian sport administrator and newspaper publisher
- William de Asevedo Furtado (born 1995), Brazilian football right-back
- Bill Gates (born 1955), American businessman and philanthropist
- William Glasser (1925–2013), American psychiatrist
- William A. Goff (1929–2019), judge of the United States Tax Court
- William Gold (born 1996), British Twitch streamer, YouTuber, and musician known as Wilbur Soot
- William Gopallawa (1896–1981), last Governor-General of Ceylon, first President of Sri Lanka
- W. G. Grace (1848–1915), British cricketer
- William Greiner (born 1957), American photographer and painter
- William Grigahcine (born 1986), French musician professionally known as DJ Snake
- William Gulick (1814–1904), American physician and politician
- William "Yamyam" Gucong (born 1993), Filipino actor and comedian
- William Talbot Handy (1894–1983), American Methodist minister
- William Talbot Handy, Jr. (1924–1998), American civil rights activist and United Methodist bishop
- W. G. Hardy (1895–1979), Canadian professor, writer and ice hockey administrator
- William Hartnell (1908–1975), British actor
- William Randolph Hearst Sr. (1863–1951), American businessman, newspaper publisher and politician
- William Randolph Hearst Jr., (1908–1993), American businessman and newspaper publisher; son of William Randolph Hearst Sr.
- William F. Roemer Jr., FBI agent.
- William Heinecke (born 1949), American-born Thai businessman
- Bill Hicks (1961–1994), American stand-up comedian
- William Higinbotham (1910–1994), American physicist
- William Holden (1918–1981), American actor
- William Hootkins, American actor
- William Hurt (1950–2022), American actor
- William M. Ireland (died 1891), American co-founder of the National Grange of the Order of Patrons of Husbandry
- William Ivens (1878–1957) Canadian religious and political figure
- William H. Jacoby (1841–1905), American photographer
- João William Alves de Jesus, (born 1996), Brazilian football defender
- William Katt (born 1951), American actor
- William Kempster (1914–1977), British artist
- William Kempster (mason) (1651–1717), English stonemason
- William Kunnecke (disappeared 1919), American fugitive
- William Lai (born 1959), Taiwanese politician
- William LeMassena (1916–1993), American actor
- William LeMessurier (1926–2007), American structural engineer
- William L. Leverette (1913–2003), American World War II flying ace
- William Lindstedt, (fl. 2022), American politician
- William Michael Lynn (born 1958), American academic
- William MacDonald (1924–2015), English serial killer
- William Bandara Makuloluwa (1922–1984), Sri Lankan musicologist, author, and director
- William Francis Mannix (died 1920), author and forger
- William P. Marontate (1919–1943), American World War II flying ace
- William King McAlister (1850–1923), justice of the Tennessee Supreme Court
- William K. McAllister (1818–1888), justice of the Supreme Court of Illinois
- William David McCalden (1951–1990), British far-right activist
- William McKenna (politician) (born 1946), American politician
- William McKenna (actor), Australian actor
- William McKinley (1843–1901), 25th president of the United States
- William McMahon (1908–1988), 20th prime minister of Australia
- William McNamara (born 1965), American actor
- William Meff (1861–1935), Scottish businessman
- William Ephraim Mikell (1868–1944), American legal scholar and lawyer
- William Millward (1822–1871), American politician
- William Alexander Milne, Scottish-Australian photographer
- William Ntoso, Ghanaian member of parliament
- William Nylander (born 1996), Swedish ice hockey winger
- William (footballer, born 1968), full name William César de Oliveira, Brazilian football midfielder
- William Onyeabor (1946–2017), Nigerian funk musician
- Will Ospreay (born 1993), English professional wrestler
- William Parente (1949–2009), New York real estate attorney
- William Pepper (1843–1898), American physician and Provost of the University of Pennsylvania
- Galappatti Kankanange William Perera (1884–1956), Sri Lankan lawyer, educator, diplomat
- William Phipps (1922–2018), American actor and singer, best known for performing the voice of Prince Charming from Disney's Cinderella
- William Pellen (born 1985 or 1986), Australian game designer
- William Pitt, 1st Earl of Chatham or William Pitt the Elder (1708–1778), British statesman and prime minister
- William Pitt the Younger (1759–1806), British statesman and prime minister
- William Poole (1821–1855), also known as Bill the Butcher, a gang leader in New York city
- William Popper (1874–1963), American Orientalist and professor
- William H. Quealy (1913–1993), judge of the United States Tax Court
- Don William Rajapatirana (fl. 1930s–1960s), Governor of the Central Bank of Sri Lanka from 1959 to 1967
- William Rawle (1759–1836), United States Attorney for Pennsylvania
- William Redmond (died 1980), American murder victim
- Will Rogers (1879–1935) American humorous social commentator
- William Ronckendorff (1812–1891), United States Navy officer
- William Arthur Conceição dos Santos (born 1982), Brazilian football striker
- Toby Sexsmith (William Raymond; 1885–1943), Canadian politician and ice hockey administrator
- William Russell (also known as Russell Enoch, 1924–2024), English actor
- William Ruto, 5th and current President of Kenya
- William August Schulze, German-American rocket scientist and Operation Paperclip hire
- William Shatner (born 1931), Canadian actor
- William Tecumseh Sherman (1820–1891), American Civil War General
- William Crapon Sibley (1832–1902), American business executive
- William José Assis Silva (1933–2024), Brazilian footballer
- William E. Simon (1927–2000), 63rd United States Secretary of the Treasury
- William Sobey (1927–1989), Canadian businessman
- William South (1866–1938), photographer and inventor
- William Júnior Salles de Lima Souza (born 1983), Brazilian football striker
- William Gerald Strongman (1936–2021), Canadian politician
- William Cooper Talley (1831–1903), American politician
- William Howard Taft (1857–1930), 27th president of the United States (1909–1913)
- William Taggart (1733–1798), justice of the Rhode Island Supreme Court
- W. F. Taylor (1877–1945), founding president of the Canadian Amateur Hockey Association
- William Tebeau (1925–2013), engineer and first African-American man to graduate from Oregon State University
- William Tennekoon, Governor of the Central Bank of Sri Lanka from 1967 to 1971
- William Thoresson (1932–2026), Swedish gymnast
- William Yan Thorley (born 2002), Hong Kong marathon swimmer
- William Alfred Tilleke (1860–1917), Ceylon-born Siamese lawyer, entrepreneur and aristocrat
- William To (born 1979), Hong Kong sprinter
- William Sansom Vaux (1811–1882), American mineralogist
- William Warren Vernon (1834–1919), British noble and scholar
- William Villeger (born 2000), French badminton player
- William Wei (born 1987), Taiwanese singer-songwriter
- William Wilberforce (1759–1833), British politician, philanthropist and abolitionist
- William "Amos" Wilson (1762–1821), American hermit
- William Wilson (1720–1796), British politician, MP from 1761 to 1768
- William Wilson (American academic) (born 1958), President of Oral Roberts University
- William Wilson (aquatics) (1844–1912), British journalist, swimming instructor and coach
- William Wilson (architect) (1641–1710), English architect, builder and sculptor
- William Wilson (artist) (1905–1972), British artist
- William Wilson (bishop) (1806–1888), Scottish Episcopal bishop
- William Wilson (Bombay Marine officer) (1715–1795)
- William Wilson (botanist) (1799–1871), English botanist and bryologist
- William Wilson (British Columbia politician) (1838–1922), Canadian politician
- William Wilson (canon of Windsor) (1545–1615), English Anglican priest
- William Wilson (Coventry MP) (1913–2010), British politician
- William Wilson (cricketer, born 1912), Australian cricketer
- William Wilson (dean of Cloyne), Irish Anglican cleric
- William Wilson (defender), English footballer
- William Wilson (died 1582), English politician
- William Wilson (Donegal MP) (1836–1879), Irish politician
- William Wilson (Dundee minister) (1808–1888), Scottish minister
- William Wilson (engineer) (1809–1862), British mechanical engineer
- William Wilson (English academic) (1875–1965), English physicist
- William Wilson (field hockey) (1917–1984), American hockey player
- William Wilson (footballer, born 1902), English footballer
- William Wilson (footballer, born 1915), English footballer
- William Wilson (footballer, born 1921), Scottish footballer
- William Wilson (footballer, born 2001) (born 2001), Kenyan footballer
- William Wilson (footballer, born November 1915), English footballer
- William Wilson (Illinois judge) (1794–1857), American judge
- William Wilson (Iowa politician) (1820–1900), American politician
- William Wilson (mayor) (1819–1897), New Zealand politician
- William Wilson (New Brunswick politician) (1845–1921), Canadian politician
- William Wilson (Ohio politician) (1773–1827), Ohio politician
- William Wilson (Pennsylvania politician), American politician
- William Wilson (physicist) (1887–1948), English-born physicist
- William Wilson (poet) (1801–1860), American poet
- William Wilson (Queensland politician) (1832–1903), Australian politician
- William Wilson (Secession minister) (1690–1741), Scottish Presbyterian minister
- William Wilson (soldier, born 1847) (1847–1895), US Army Medal of Honor recipient twice
- William Wilson (South African cricketer) (1925–2005), South African cricketer
- William Wilson (sportsman, born 1909) (1909–1976), Australian rules footballer
- William Wilson (swimmer) (born 1964), Filipino swimmer
- William Wilson (Upper Canada politician) (1789–1847), Upper Canada militia officer, politician, and justice of the peace
- William Wilson (Victorian politician) (1834–1891), Australian politician
- William Wilson (Westhoughton MP) (1855–1921), British trade unionist and Labour politician
- William Wilson (Wisconsin politician) (1807–1892), American politician
- William Wilson (wrestler) (1887–1955), British wrestler
- William Wilson (Zouave) (1823–1874), Union Army brevet brigadier general
- William A. Wilson (diplomat) (1914–2009), American businessman and diplomat
- William A. Wilson (folklorist) (1933–2016), American scholar of Mormon folklore
- William Adam Wilson (1928–1994), Scottish lawyer
- William B. Wilson (1862–1934), American politician
- William C. Wilson (judge) (1812–1882), American judge
- William C. Wilson (minister) (1866–1915), American Nazarene general superintendent
- William C. Wilson (New York politician) (1866–1943), American politician
- William Carus Wilson (1791–1859), English writer
- William Chisholm Wilson (1810–1876), New Zealand newspaper proprietor
- William Croft Wilson (1931–1963), American Congregationalist minister
- William Deane Wilson (1843–1921), British Army surgeon
- William E. Wilson (Indiana politician) (1870–1948), American politician
- William E. Wilson (photographer) (1853–1905), English photographer
- William E. Wilson (writer) (1906–1988), American writer
- William Edward Wilson (astronomer) (1851–1908), Irish astronomer
- William George Wilson (1917–2007), American cinematographer
- William H. Wilson (1877–1937), American politician
- William H. Wilson (New York politician) (c. 1873 – 1901), American politician
- William Hardy Wilson (1881–1955), Australian architect
- William Hawkins Wilson (1866–1956), British physiologist
- William J. Wilson (1874–1936), Scottish theatre director
- William James Erasmus Wilson (1809–1884), British surgeon
- William Julius Wilson (born 1935), American sociologist
- William K. Wilson (c. 1817 – 1898), American politician
- William L. Wilson (nanoscientist), American nanoscientist
- William Llewellyn Wilson (1887–1950), American conductor
- William Lyall Wilson (1866–1914), Scottish Presbyterian minister
- William Lyne Wilson (1843–1900), American politician and lawyer
- William M. Wilson (politician) (1838–1904), American politician
- William Othello Wilson (1869–1928), United States Army Medal of Honor recipient
- William Parkinson Wilson (1825–1874), British astronomer and professor of mathematics
- William Proctor Wilson (1921–2010), American businessman-philanthropist
- William Rae Wilson (1772–1849), Scottish lawyer, landowner and travel writer
- William Scott Wilson (born 1944), Japanese-English translator
- William Sydney Wilson (1816–1862), American politician
- William T. Wilson (born 1937), American lawyer and politician
- William Tecumseh Wilson (1823–1905), Union Army officer
- William Wallace Wilson (1876–1967), Canadian politician
- William Warfield Wilson (1868–1942), American politician
- William Wilber Wilfred Wilson (1885–1964), Canadian politician
- William Wordsworth (1770–1850), English poet
- William Worsham, American politician
- William Worth (1745–1808), American Baptist minister
- Bill Wurtz (born 1989), American musician, songwriter, music producer, voice actor, video editor, and animator
- William H. Yale (1831–1917), American politician
- William L. Yancey (1814–1863), American politician
- William Yarbrough (born 1989), American soccer player
- William Yarrell (1784–1867), English zoologist, writer and naturalist
- William Butler Yeats (1865–1939), Irish poet
- William Kwong Yu Yeung (born 1960), Hong Kong-born Canadian astronomer
- William H. Yohn Jr. (1935–2026), American judge
- William Yolland (1810–1885), English military surveyor, astronomer, and engineer
- William Yorzyk (1933–2020), American swimmer
- William Youatt (1776–1847), English veterinary surgeon and animal welfare writer
- Aretas William Young (1778–1835), Canadian politician
- William Young (Nova Scotia politician) (1799–1887), Canadian politician
- William Young (VC) (1876–1916), Scottish Victoria Cross recipient
- William Allen Young (born 1954), American actor and director
- William G. Young (born 1940), American federal judge
- William Henry Young (1863–1942), English mathematician
- William J. Young (coach) (1881–1957), American sports coach
- William P. Young (born 1955), Canadian Christian author
- William T. Young (1918–2004), American businessman
- William L. Younger (1894–1977), American sports coach
- William Pitt the Younger (1759–1806), British statesman
- William S. Youngman (1872–1934), American politician
- William Yount (1899–1972), American hurdler
- William Yurko (1926–2010), Canadian politician
- William Zabka (born 1965), American actor
- William Zulock (born 1989), American child rapist

== Fictional characters ==
- William "Will", a character in Veronica Roth's Divergent
- William Afton, primary antagonist of the Five Nights at Freddy's series
- William Baker (nicknamed "Flint Marko"), also known as Sandman from Marvel Comics
- William "Will" Byers, from Stranger Things
- William "Will" Colbert, a guest star in the NBC sitcom Friends, played by Brad Pitt
- William "Bill" Denbrough, main protagonist in Stephen King's novel It
- Will Graham, in Thomas Harris' novel Red Dragon
- William Kaplan from Marvel comics
- William "Billy" Loomis, main villain in the 1996 film Scream
- William "Will" McKenzie, from The Inbetweeners
- Billy Mitchell, a character in the British soap opera EastEnders
- William Riker, first officer on the Enterprise-D in the Star Trek franchise
- William "Bill" Sikes, one of the main antagonists in Charles Dickens' novel Oliver Twist
- William Solace, head healer in Percy Jackson & the Olympians
- William Toughbutt, a character in Ninjago
- William Murderface, a character from the Adult Swim show Metalocalypse.

== See also ==
- King William (disambiguation)
- Prince William (disambiguation)
- Saint William (disambiguation)
- List of people with given name Liam
