= William Kelly =

William, Willie, Will or Bill Kelly may refer to:

== Arts and entertainment ==
- Bill Kelly (writer), American screenwriter
- William Kelly (artist), American artist
- Roosevelt Sykes (1906–1983), American blues musician, stage name "Willie Kelly"

== Politics ==
- William Kelly (Alabama politician) (1786–1834), Alabama politician and U.S. senator
- William Kelly (New York state senator) (1807–1872), New York politician
- William W. J. Kelly (1814–1878), lieutenant governor of Florida
- William Moore Kelly (1827–1888), businessman and politician in New Brunswick
- William Kelly (New Zealand politician) (1840–1907), New Zealand member of parliament
- William Kelly (Labour politician) (1874–1944), British Labour politician
- William Kelly (New South Wales politician) (1875–1932), Australian politician
- Willie Kelly (politician) (1877–1960), Australian politician
- William Osmund Kelly (1909–1974), mayor of Flint, Michigan
- William McDonough Kelly (1925–2013), political strategist and Canadian senator
- William Nelson Kelly (1939–2023), member of the Minnesota House of Representatives
- Bill Kelly (politician), politician in Lapeer, Michigan

== Sports ==
=== American football ===
- Bill Kelly (quarterback) (1905–1931), American football player at the University of Montana and in the NFL
- Bill Kelly (American football, born 1947) (1947–2023), American football player and coach
- Kenneth Kelly (1905–1984), nicknamed "Bill", American football player and coach, head coach at Central Michigan University, 1951–1966

=== Australian rules football ===
- Bill Kelly (footballer, born 1882) (1882–1961), Australian rules footballer for Fitzroy
- Bill Kelly (footballer, born 1930) (born 1930), Australian rules footballer for Footscray
- Will Kelly (Australian footballer) (born 2000), Australian rules footballer for Collingwood

=== Baseball ===
- Bill Kelly (outfielder), 19th-century American baseball player
- Bill Kelly (first baseman) (1898–1990), American baseball player
- Billy Kelly (baseball) (William Joseph Kelly, 1886–1940), American baseball player
- William Kelly (baseball), Negro league baseball player

=== Other sports ===
- Bill Kelly (rugby league) (1892–1975), New Zealand rugby league footballer and coach
- Will Kelly (rugby union) (born 1997), Canadian rugby union player
- William Kelly (Victoria cricketer) (1875–1968), Australian cricketer
- William Harvey Kelly (1883–1944), Australian cricketer
- William Kelly (1910s footballer) (1890-1920), English footballer for Newcastle United and Manchester City, see List of Manchester City F.C. players (1–24 appearances)
- Brian Kelly (footballer, born 1937) (William Brian Kelly, 1937–2013), English footballer
- Willie Kelly (footballer) (1922–1996), Scottish footballer for Airdrieonians and Blackburn Rovers
- Billy Kelly (boxer) (William Kelly, 1932–2010), boxer from Northern Ireland

== Others ==
- William Kelly (biblical scholar) (1821–1906), classicist and Biblical expositor
- William Kelly (inventor) (1811–1888), American inventor of a steel smelting process
- William Bernard Kelly (1855–1921), Australian bishop of the Catholic Church
- William Henderson Kelly (1902–1980), American professor of anthropology
- William Russell Kelly, founder of the American temporary staffing agency, Kelly Services

== See also ==
- William Kelly's War, a 2014 film
- Billy Kelly (disambiguation)
- William Kelley (disambiguation)
