= William Jacoby =

William Jacoby may refer to:

- William G. Jacoby (born c. 1953), political scientist
- William Jacoby (actor) (born 1969), American actor
- W. H. Jacoby (1841–1905), American photographer
