= King Billy =

King Billy may refer to:

== People ==
=== Australia ===
- Jimmy Clements (1847–1927), Wiradjuri elder, also known as "King Billy"
- King Billy of Armidale, NSW, a.k.a. King Bobby, Aboriginal leader, grandfather of Frank Archibald, in honour of whom the Frank Archibald Memorial Lecture Series was named
- King Billy of Bonny Doon Lorne, Bidjara elder and great-great-grandfather of Christian Thompson (artist), honoured by his 2010 work King Billy
- King Billy Cokebottle (c. 1949–2019), white Australian comedian who wore blackface
- Willem Baa Nip (1836–1885), also known as King Billy, William Gore or Billy Wa-wha, was a member of the Wathaurung people
- William Lanne (c. 1835–1869), last surviving male of the Aboriginal Tasmanian Oyster Cove clan, known as King Billy

=== United Kingdom ===
- Billy Bremner (1942–1997), Scottish footballer, often referred to as "King Billy" by supporters
- William III of England (1650–1702), informally known in Northern Ireland and Scotland as "King Billy"

== Other ==
- King Billy Pine, a species of Athrotaxis
- King Billy of Ballarat and Other Stories (1892), a series of short stories by Morley Roberts

== See also ==
- Billy King (disambiguation)
- King William (disambiguation)
