= Kaiser Wilhelm II (disambiguation) =

Kaiser Wilhelm II was a German Emperor.

Kaiser Wilhelm II may also refer to:

- Kaiser Wilhelm II Land, Antarctica
- Feste Kaiser Wilhelm II or Fort de Mutzig, a fortress in Alsace

== See also ==
- List of ships named SS Kaiser Wilhelm II
- Kaiser Wilhelm (disambiguation)
- Wilhelm II (disambiguation)
