= William IX =

William IX may refer to:

- William IX of Aquitaine (1071–1126)
- William IX of Montferrat (1494–1518)
- William, Duke of Jülich-Cleves-Berg (1516–1592)
- William I, Elector of Hesse (or Hesse-Cassel), also known as William IX, Landgrave of Hesse-Kassel, (1743–1821)

== See also ==
- King William (disambiguation)
- Prince William (disambiguation)
- List of people with given name William#Royalty and nobility
