= William X =

William X may refer to:

- William X of Aquitaine (1099–1137)
- William X of Auvergne (r. 1222–1247)
- Guglielmo X Gonzaga, Duke of Mantua (1538–1587)

== See also ==
- King William (disambiguation)
- Prince William (disambiguation)
- List of people with given name William#Royalty and nobility
