= William V of Holland =

William V of Holland may refer to:

- William I, Duke of Bavaria (1330–1389), son of the emperor Louis IV, Holy Roman Emperor and his second wife Margaret of Holland
- William V, Prince of Orange (1748–1806), son of William IV and Anne, Princess Royal and Princess of Orange

== See also ==
- William V (disambiguation)
