= William VIII =

William VIII may refer to:

- William VIII, Duke of Aquitaine (1025–1086)
- William VIII of Montpellier (died 1202)
- William VIII of Jülich, Count of Ravensberg (c. 1380–1428)
- William VIII, Marquis of Montferrat (1420–1483)
- William VIII, Landgrave of Hesse-Kassel (1682–1760)

== See also ==
- King William (disambiguation)
- Prince William (disambiguation)
- List of people with given name William#Royalty and nobility
