= William Arnett (disambiguation) =

William Arnett (1939–2020) was an American art collector.

William Arnett may also refer to:

- W. David Arnett (born 1940), American astrophysicist
- Will Arnett (born 1970), Canadian-American actor and comedian

== See also ==
- William Arndt (born 1993), American Canadian football player
- William Arnott (disambiguation)
- William Barnett (disambiguation)
- William Garnett (disambiguation)
- William Harnett (1848–1892), American painter
