= William V =

William V may refer to:

- William V of Aquitaine (969–1030)
- William V of Montpellier (1075–1121)
- William V of Montferrat (c. 1115 – 1191)
- William V of Nevers (before 1175 – 1181)
- William V, Duke of Jülich (1299–1361)
- William V, Count of Holland (1330–1389)
- William V of Jülich-Berg (1516–1592)
- William V, Duke of Bavaria (1548–1626)
- William V, Landgrave of Hesse-Kassel (1602–1637)
- William V, Prince of Orange (1748–1806)

== Fictional characters ==
- King of the United Kingdom in the early twentieth century in the 1953 alternate history novel Bring the Jubilee by Ward Moore
- King of Great Britain and Emperor of the West from 2008 to 2039 in The Emberverse series by S. M. Stirling, based on the now-Prince of Wales
- King following the abdication of John II in the 1980 alternate history novel Headlong by Emlyn Williams
- An eighteenth century king in Her Majesty's American by Steve White
- The titular character of the 1996 comedy television film Willi und die Windzors, who becomes king after the British monarchy's brief abolition.

== See also ==
- Guillaume V, lists people named with the French equivalent of William V
  - Guillaume V of Luxembourg (born 1981)
- King William (disambiguation)
- Prince William (disambiguation)
  - William, Prince of Wales (born 1982), possible future regnal name
- List of people with given name William § Royalty and nobility
