= Willem IV =

Willem IV can refer to:

- Willem IV of Horne (1303-1343)
- Willem IV van den Bergh (1537-1586)
- Willem IV of Nassau (1711-1751), also known as William IV, Prince of Orange

== See also ==
- William IV (disambiguation)
