= William VI =

William VI may refer to:

- William VI, Duke of Aquitaine (1004–1038)
- William VI, Count of Auvergne (1096–1136)
- William VI of Montpellier (before 1120–after 1161)
- William VI, Marquess of Montferrat (c. 1173–1226)
- William II, Duke of Bavaria (died 1417), also William VI of Holland
- William the Younger, Duke of Brunswick-Lüneburg (1535–1592)
- William VI, Landgrave of Hesse-Kassel (or Hesse-Cassel) (1629–1663)
- William I of the Netherlands (1772–1843), also William VI of Orange

== See also ==
- King William (disambiguation)
- Prince William (disambiguation)
- List of people with given name William#Royalty and nobility
