= William Worth =

William Worth may refer to:

- William Worth (Irish judge) (c. 1646–1721), Irish judge
- William Worth (scholar) (1677–1742), English classical scholar and divine
- William J. Worth (1794–1849), United States general
- William Worth (minister) (1745–1808), controversial Baptist minister in New Jersey
- William Worth (diplomat) (born 1912), Australian diplomat
