= William VII =

William VII may refer to:

- William VII, Duke of Aquitaine (1023–1058)
- William VII the Young of Auvergne (r. 1145–1168)
- William VII of Montpellier (c. 1131 – c. 1172)
- William VII of Angoulême (died 1186)
- William VII, Marquis of Montferrat (c. 1240–1292)
- William VII of Jülich, 1st Duke of Berg (c. 1348-1408)
- William VII of Chalon-Arlay (c. 1415–1475)
- William VII, Landgrave of Hesse-Kassel (1651–1670)

== See also ==
- King William (disambiguation)
- Prince William (disambiguation)
- List of people with given name William#Royalty and nobility
