= William Randolph (disambiguation) =

William Randolph (1650-1711) was an early colonist, landowner, planter, merchant, and politician in Virginia.

William Randolph may also refer to:

- William Randolph II (1681–1741), American planter and politician, son of William Randolph
- William Randolph III (son of William) (born c. 1710), owner of Wilton plantation house
- William Randolph III (son of Thomas) (born 1712), owner of Tuckahoe plantation
- William Millican Randolph (1893–1928), U.S. Army aviator
- William Larry Randolph (1954 – present), former professional baseball second baseman

== See also ==
- William Randolph Hearst (disambiguation)
- Randolph family of Virginia
