= William Arnaud =

William Arnaud or Guillaume Arnaud may refer to:

- William Arnaud (inquisitor) (died 1242)
- William Arnaud (philosopher) (fl. late 13th century)
- Guillaume V Arnaud de La Mothe, bishop of Bazas in 1302–1313

== See also ==
- William Arnold (disambiguation)
