= Guillaume V =

Guillaume V may refer to:

== Nobility and royalty ==
- William V, Duke of Aquitaine (969–1030; French: Guillaume V, duc d'Aquitaine), of the Duchy of Aquitaine, now a part of France
- William V, Count of Nevers (died 1181; French: Guillaume V, compte de Nevers), of the County of Nevers, now a part of France
- Guillaume V, Grand Duke of Luxembourg (born 1981), reigning grand duke since 2025

== Bishops ==
- Guillaume V de Saint-Mère-Eglise (Guillaume V, Bishop of Avranches), 13th century Roman Catholic bishop of Avranches; see Roman Catholic Diocese of Coutances
- Guillaume V, Bishop of Embrun; 13th century bishop of Roman Catholic Archdiocese of Embrun
- Guillaume V Arnaud de La Mothe (Guillaume V, Bishop of Bazas), 14th century Roman Catholic bishop of Bazas
- Guillaume V de Labroue (Guillaume V, Bishop of Cahors), 14th century bishop of Roman Catholic Diocese of Cahors
- Guillaume V Lefèvre (Guillaume V, Bishop of Périgueux), 15th century bishop of the Roman Catholic Diocese of Périgueux
- Guillaume V Arnaud de Laborde (Guillaume V, Bishop of Bayonne), 15th century bishop of the Roman Catholic Diocese of Bayonne, Lescar and Oloron
- Guillaume V Soybert (Guillaume V, Bishop of Uzès), 15th century bishop of the Roman Catholic Diocese of Uzès
- Guillaume V of Rarogne (Guillaume V, Bishop of Sion), 15th century bishop of Sion; see List of bishops of Sion
- Guillaume V de Barton (Guillaume V, Bishop of Lectoure), 16th century bishop of the ancient Diocese of Lectoure
- Guillaume V of Joyeuse (Guillaume V, Bishop of Alet), 16th century bishop of Alet from the House of Joyeuse

== Others ==
- Guillaume V Tesson (Guillaume V, Abbot of Lyre), 14th century abbot of Lyre Abbey
- Guillaume de l'Orme (Guillaume V, Prior of Le Plessis-Grimoult), 15th century prior of the Priory of Le Plessis-Grimoult

== See also ==
- William V (disambiguation), lists people named with the English equivalent of Guillaume V
