= William I =

William I may refer to:

== Kings ==
- William the Conqueror (c. 1028–1087), also known as William I, King of England
- William I of Sicily (died 1166)
- William I of Scotland (died 1214), known as William the Lion
- William I of the Netherlands and Luxembourg (1772–1843)
- William I of Bimbia (fl. 1850s)
- William I of Württemberg (1781–1864)
- Wilhelm I (1797–1888), King of Prussia and later German Emperor

== Nobles ==
- William I of Gascony (died 848)
- William I of Aquitaine (died 918)
- William I of Montferrat (fl. 924)
- William I of Normandy (c. 900–942)
- William I of Montpellier (fl. 980s)
- William I of Provence (c. 950–993)
- William I Talvas (c. 995–after 1030), seigneur of Alençon
- William Iron Arm (before 1010–1046), Duke of Apulia
- William I, Bishop of Utrecht (died 1076)
- William I, Count of Nevers (c. 1030–after 1083)
- William I, Count of Burgundy (1020–1087)
- William de Warenne, 1st Earl of Surrey (died 1088)
- William I of Cerdanya (1068–1095)
- William of Bures (died 1142), French crusader
- William I of Béarn (died 1173)
- William le Gros, 1st Earl of Albemarle (died 1179)
- William I of Geneva (fl. 1190s)
- William of Champlitte (died 1209), Prince of Achaea
- William I of Cagliari (c. 1160–1214)
- William I, Lord of Douglas (died c. 1214)
- William I, Count of Holland (c. 1167–1222)
- Uilleam I, Earl of Ross (died 1274)
- William I de la Roche (died 1287), Duke of Athens
- William I, Count of Hainaut (1286–1337)
- William I, Duke of Bavaria (1330–1389)
- William I of Guelders and Jülich (1364–1402)
- William I, Margrave of Meissen (1343–1407), known as William I, the one-eyed
- William I, Landgrave of Hesse (1466–1515)
- William I, Count of Nassau-Siegen (1487–1559)
- William the Silent (1533–1584), Prince of Orange
- Guglielmo I Gonzaga (1538–1587), Duke of Mantua
- William I, Elector of Hesse (1743–1821)

== See also ==
- King William (disambiguation)
- Prince William (disambiguation)
- List of people with given name William § Royalty and nobility
