= Billy King =

Billy King may refer to:

- Billy King (sportsman) (1902–1987), Irish cricketer and Singaporean rugby union player
- Billy King (Australian footballer) (1920–1990), Australian rules footballer
- Billy King (basketball) (born 1966), American basketball player and general manager
- Billy King (footballer, born 1994), Scottish footballer (St Patrick's Athletic F.C.)
- Billy King (comedian) (1867–1951/75–1951), American vaudeville entertainer and showman
- Robin King (born 1966), Northern Irish paramilitary nicknamed "Billy"

== See also ==
- William King (disambiguation)
