= Saint Fremund =

Saint Fremund, also known as Freomund, was a ninth-century saint, hermit and martyr in Anglo-Saxon England. He is venerated at both the village of Prescote in Oxfordshire, where he is patron saint, and at Dunstable Priory in Bedfordshire.

== Legend and life ==
The following summary of the legend as it runs in John of Tynemouth's version is given by Sir Thomas Duffus Hardy.

Fremund was the son of a pagan king who reigned in England, named Offa, and his queen Botilda, his birth being foretold by a child, who died when three days old. He is baptized by Bishop Heswi, performs many miracles, and converts his parents. Offa resigns his kingdom to his son, who, after governing a year and a half, forsakes the throne to serve God in a desert place, accompanied by Burchard (who afterwards wrote his life) and another attendant. He then embarks in a vessel, sailing from Caerleon-on-Usk, and is driven to a small island called Ylefage, sometimes identified with Lundy, which is infested by demons. Here he lives seven years on fruits and roots. Hinguar and his brother, Hubba ravage England and put King Edmund to death. Offa sends twenty nobles to seek his son throughout England, and, finding him, they implore his aid, and he assents in consequence of a vision in which it is revealed that each of his companions shall appear a thousand to his enemies. He attacks and defeats 40,000 of the enemy with the twenty who have come to seek him, in addition to his two companions; in a great battle at Radford Semele and, while he is prostrate in thanksgiving for the victory, Oswi, formerly one of Offa's commanders, but who had apostatized and joined the pagans, cuts off his head. Blood spurts over Oswi, who implores absolution and forgiveness, which the head pronounces. Fremund rises and carries his head some distance, when, a spring bursting forth, he washes his wound, falls prostrate and expires.

The legend has a number of historical inconsistencies. Offa's wife was called Cynethryth not Botilda and the name is not mentioned in any charter or by any chronicler. Bishop Heswi, or Oswy as the name is written in John Lydgate's Metrical Legend, cannot be identified. Offa died on 29 July 796 and was succeeded by his son Ecgfrith, "Who had been anointed king in his lifetime" according to William of Malmsbury and Æthelweard. Egferth died the same year as Offa and so none of the legend fits the history on these points. King Edmund was martyred in November 870, 74 years after Offa's death. And therefore the connection with the Danish invasion seems more probable than that with Offa, and so Fremund, if he existed, should be dated to the mid 9th century.

== Veneration ==
After his death Fremund's body was taken to Offchurch in Warwickshire where his tomb became a place of pilgrimage for those seeking healing. In about AD 931 his remains were taken to Cropredy in Oxfordshire. Later, around 1207-1210, some of his relics were removed from Cropredy to a new shrine at Dunstable Priory in Bedfordshire, but his shrine at Cropredy continued to be venerated until early in the 16th century. His shrines at both Cropredy and Dunstable were destroyed in the 1530s during the English Reformation.

St. Fremund's feast day in May continued to be celebrated as a fair in Dunstable until early in the 20th century. A parish church of St. Fremund the Martyr was built in 1967-68 to serve a new housing estate in Dunstable (grid reference TL22052375).

== Historical sources ==
The earliest known author to record the legend appears to be William of Ramsey, a compiler of lives of saints and others, and who seems to have been a monk of Croyland. Writing around 1220, his account is a version, in Latin verse, of a legend which probably belonged to the twelfth century. However, none of the earlier chroniclers, such as the Anglo-Saxon Chronicle, Henry of Huntingdon, William of Malmesbury, Matthew Paris, mention Fremund at all, though all deal with aspects of the reign of Offa. Further, though Offa's children and relations sign charters, the name of Fremund does not occur anywhere. Besides this, there is a prose version of the fourteenth century, which may well include much of the original twelfth-century version, though probably simplified. It occurs in the collection Sanctilogium Angliae Walliae Scotiae et Hiberniae compiled by John of Tynemouth in 1366 and summarised by Hardy above.

== See also ==
- Edmund the Martyr

== Sources ==
- Crossley, Alan; Christina Colvin, Janet Cooper, N. H. Cooper, P. D. A. Harvey, Marjory Hollings, Judith Hook, Mary Jessup, Mary D. Lobel, J. F. A. Mason, B. S. Trinder, Hilary Turner (1972). Victoria County History: a History of the County of Oxford, Volume 10. pp. 157–175.
- Lydgate, John (2004). The life of St Edmund, King and martyr. London: British Library Publishing Division. ISBN 0-7123-4871-9. OCLC: 59265769.
- James Ivan Miller (1967). "John Lydgate's Saint Edmund and Saint Fremund" (Dissertation). Harvard University.
- Barbara Watling (2008). "St Fremund. The Lost Patron Saint of Dunstable". Catholic Life Magazine. Archived from the original (Article) on 2011-07-17.
- Winstead, K. A. (2007). John Capgrave's Fifteenth Century. Philadelphia: University of Pennsylvania Press. pp. 130–132. ISBN 978-0-8122-3977-5. OCLC: 70259035.
- Rev. Canon Wood, D.D. (1893). "A Forgotten Saint" (Article). The Antiquary. 27.
