= William Doane =

William Doane may refer to:

- William Croswell Doane (1832–1913), American Episcopal bishop
- William Howard Doane (1832–1915), American inventor, hymn writer, church leader and philanthropist
- William Doane (architect), American architect in Ohio who designed the William Marshall Anderson House

== See also ==
- William Duane (disambiguation)
