= Wilhelm II (disambiguation) =

Wilhelm II was German emperor and King of Prussia from 1888 to 1918.

Wilhelm II may also refer to:

- William II of Isenburg-Wied (reigned 1383–88)
- William II, Duke of Bavaria (reigned 1404–17)
- William II, Landgrave of Hesse (reigned 1493–1509)
- William II, Elector of Hesse (reigned 1821–47)
- William II of Württemberg (reigned 1891–1918)

== See also ==
- Kaiser Wilhelm II (disambiguation)
- Willem II (disambiguation), lists people and other objects named with the Dutch equivalent of Wilhelm II
- William II (disambiguation), lists people named with the English equivalent of Wilhelm II
