= Billy Arnold =

Billy Arnold may refer to:

- Billy Arnold (baseball) (1851–1899), American baseball player
- Billy Arnold (basketball) (born 1940s), American college basketball player
- Billy Arnold (boxer) (1926–1995), American boxer
- Billy Arnold (racing driver) (1905–1976), American racing driver
- Billy Boy Arnold (born 1935), American blues harmonica player, singer and songwriter

== See also ==
- Bill Arnold (disambiguation)
- William Arnold (disambiguation)
