= Guillaume IV =

Guillaume IV may refer to:

- William IV of Aquitaine (937–994)
- William IV of Nevers (c. 1130–1168)
- William IV, Grand Duke of Luxembourg (1852–1912)

== See also ==
- William IV (disambiguation), lists people named with the English equivalent of Guillaume IV
