= Kaiser Wilhelm =

Kaiser Wilhelm is a common reference to two German emperors:

- Wilhelm I (1797–1888)
- Wilhelm II (1859–1941)

Kaiser Wilhelm may also refer to:

- Kaiser Wilhelm (baseball) (1874–1936), early 20th century baseball pitcher
- Kaiser Wilhelm Society, a German entity
- Kaiser Wilhelm Memorial Church, a memorial church for Wilhelm I
- Kaiser-Wilhelm-Brücke, a bridge in Wilhelmshaven
- Kaiser-Wilhelmsland, a part of New Guinea

== See also ==
- Kaiser Wilhelm II (disambiguation)
