= William III =

William III or William the Third may refer to:

== Kings ==
- William III of Sicily (c. 1186 – c. 1198)
- William III of England and Ireland or William III of Orange or William II of Scotland (1650–1702)
- William III of the Netherlands and Luxembourg (1817–1890)

== Nobles ==
- William III, Duke of Aquitaine (913–963)
- William II, Count of Provence, also numbered William III of Provence, (late 980s–1018)
- William III, Count of Toulouse, also styled William III of Provence (c. 970–1037)
- William III of Provence (died after 1037)
- William III of Weimar (died 1039)
- William III, Marquess of Montferrat (c. 970–1042)
- William III, Lord of Montpellier (died 1058)
- William V, Count of Angoulême, also known as William Taillefer III (1084–1118/20)
- William III, Count of Burgundy (c. 1110–1127)
- William III of Forcalquier (died 1129)
- William III of Mâcon (1088–1156)
- William III, Count of Nevers (c. 1107–1161)
- William III, Count of Ponthieu (c. 1093–1172)
- William III, Count of Jülich (r. 1207–1219)
- William II of Flanders, also styled William III of Dampierre (1224–1251)
- William de Cantilupe (died 1254)
- William III of Baux (died 1257)
- William III Giudice of Cagliari (r. 1256–1258)
- William III of Geneva (1280-1320)
- William I, Count of Hainaut or William III of Holland (c. 1286–1337)
- William III, Earl of Ross, known as Uillearn, 5th Earl of Ross (died 1372)
- William I, Duke of Bavaria or William III of Hainaut (1330–1389)
- William III, Duke of Bavaria (1375–1435)
- William III of Isenburg-Wied (r. 1413–1462)
- William III, Princely count of Henneberg-Schleusingen (1434–1480)
- William III, Landgrave of Thuringia (1425–1482)
- William III, Landgrave of Hesse (1471–1500)

== Horses ==
- William the Third (horse)

== See also ==
- Guillaume III (disambiguation), the French equivalent of William III
- King William (disambiguation)
- Prince William (disambiguation)
- List of people with given name William#Royalty and nobility
