= Bill Arnold =

Bill Arnold may refer to:

- Bill Arnold (cinematographer), American cinematographer
- Bill Arnold (ice hockey) (born 1992), American ice hockey player
- Bill Arnold (politician), Arizona politician

== See also ==
- Billy Arnold (disambiguation)
- William Arnold (disambiguation)
