= William IV (disambiguation) =

William IV (1765–1837; r. 1830–1837) was King of the United Kingdom of Great Britain and Ireland and concurrently King of Hanover.

William IV or 4 may also refer to:

- William IV of Aquitaine (937–994)
- William IV of Provence (died 1030)
- William IV of Weimar or William, Margrave of Meissen (died 1062)
- William IV of Montpellier (r. 1058–1068)
- William IV of Toulouse (c. 1040–1094)
- William IV of Montferrat (c. 1030–1100)
- William IV of Nevers (c. 1130–1168)
- William IV of Forcalquier (1130–1208)
- William IV of Saint Omer (fl. 1157–1191)
- William IV of Ponthieu (1179–1221)
- William IV, Count of Jülich (c. 1210–1278)
- William IV, Lord of Douglas (died 1333)
- William IV of Holland or William II, Count of Hainaut (1307–1345)
- William IV of Hainault or William II, Duke of Bavaria (1365–1417)
- William IV, Lord of Egmont (1412–1483)
- William IV, Duke of Brunswick-Lüneburg (c. 1425–1503)
- William IV of Jülich-Berg (1455–1511)
- William IV of Henneberg-Schleusingen (1478–1559)
- William IV of Bavaria (1493–1550)
- William IV of Hesse-Kassel (1532–1592)
- William IV, Prince of Orange (1711–1751)
- William IV of Luxembourg (1852–1912)

== See also ==
- Guillaume IV (disambiguation), the French equivalent of William IV
- King William (disambiguation)
- Prince William (disambiguation)
- William the Fourth (disambiguation)
- List of people with given name William#Royalty and nobility
