= Willem II =

Willem II may refer to:

== People ==
- William II, Prince of Orange (1626–1650), stadtholder of the United Provinces of the Netherlands
- William II of the Netherlands (1792–1849), King of the Netherlands

== Other uses ==
- Willem II Tilburg, a Dutch football club
- Willem II (women), the women's division of the above club, active 2007–2011
- Willem II–Gazelle, a professional cycling team active between 1966 and 1970
- A Dutch brand of cigars

== See also ==
- King Willem (disambiguation)
- Koning Willem de Tweede (ship), a Dutch ship wrecked off South Australia in 1857
- Koning Willem II Stadion, stadium of Dutch football club Willem II Tilburg
- Wilhelm II (disambiguation), lists people named with the German equivalent of Willem II
- William II (disambiguation), lists people named with the English equivalent of Willem II
