= William King =

William King may refer to:

== Arts ==
- Willie King (1943–2009), American blues guitarist and singer
- William King (author) (born 1959), British science fiction author and game designer, also known as Bill King
- William King (artist) (1925–2015), American sculptor
- William King (poet) (1663–1712), English poet
- William King (singer) (born 1949), American singer with the Commodores
- Bill King (photographer) (1939–1987), American fashion photographer
- Billy King (comedian) (William King, c. 1869 or 1875 – 1951), African-American vaudeville comedian

== Politics ==
- Bill King (New Hampshire politician), American politician
- William King (Canadian politician) (1930–2020), British Columbia politician
- William King (Maine governor) (1768–1852), American statesman, governor of Maine
  - William King (Simmons), an 1878 marble sculpture
- William King (West Florida governor) (died 1826), American governor of West Florida, 1818–1819
- William King (Australian politician) (1893–1966), member of the Queensland Legislative Assembly
- William Cutfield King (1829–1861), New Zealand politician
- William David King (1829–1902), English politician, four times Mayor of Portsmouth
- William E. King (1885–1967), American state senator from Illinois
- William H. King (1863–1949), U.S. senator from Utah
- William Harrison King (1814–1867), mayor of Houston, Texas
- William Lyon Mackenzie King (1874–1950), tenth pre minister of Canada
- William M. King (1800–1869), Oregon state legislator
- William R. King (1786–1853), American statesman, 13th vice president of the United States
- William R. King (judge) (1864–1934), American legislator and jurist from Oregon
- William Robert King (1888–1953), provincial level politician from Alberta, Canada
- William S. King (1828–1900), American congressman from Minnesota
- William Sterling King (1818–1882), American military officer and Massachusetts politician

== Religion ==
- William King (bishop) (1650–1729), Anglican archbishop of Dublin
- William King (minister) (1812–1895), Canadian Presbyterian minister and community founder
- William Smyth King (1810–1890), dean of Leighlin
- William King (priest) (died 1590), canon of Windsor

== Science ==
- W. B. R. King (William Bernard Robinson King, 1889–1963), British geologist
- William King (physician) (1786–1865), British physician, supporter of cooperative movement
- William King (engineer) (1851–1929), Scottish engineer
- William King (geologist) (1809–1886), Irish geologist, first to recognize Homo neanderthalensis as a species
- William Wickham King (1863–1959), British amateur geologist
- William Frederick King (1854–1916), Canadian surveyor, astronomer, and civil servant
- William King (GSI) (died 1900), geologist with the Geological Survey of India
- William Paul King, American mechanical engineer
- William Richard King (born 1938), American management and information scientist

== Sports ==
- Bill King (1927–2005), American sports radio announcer
- Bill King (Australian rugby league), rugby league footballer in Australia
- Bill King (New Zealand rugby league) (fl. 1910s), New Zealand international rugby league player
- Billy King (sportsman) (William Robert King, 1902–1987), Irish cricketer
- William King (London cricketer), English cricketer of the 1750s
- William King (footballer) (1898–1962), Scottish international footballer
- William King (rugby union) (1890–1937), American rugby union player
- Willie King (basketball) (1915–1965), American basketball player
- Dolly King (William King, 1916–1969), American baseball player
- Billy King (Australian footballer) (William Herbert King, 1920–1990), Australian rules footballer

== Other ==
- Bill King (Royal Navy officer) (1910–2012), British submarine commander, circumnavigator, author
- William King (police officer) (born 1972), former Baltimore police officer sentenced to 315 years in prison
- William King (academic) (1685–1763), English Jacobite academic and writer
- William King, 1st Earl of Lovelace (1805–1893), 8th Baron King and 1st Earl of Lovelace
- William King (merchant) (c. 1785–1861), West Indies merchant and slave owner
- William Manly King (1886–1961), American architect
- William G. King Jr. (1918–2009), United States Air Force general
- William King Atkinson (born William King; 1765–1820), American lawyer and judge
- William Davies King (born 1955), American theater historian, author, and collage artist

== See also ==
- Billy King (disambiguation)
- King William (disambiguation)
