= William Brydges (disambiguation) =

William Brydges may refer to:

- William Brydges, 20th-century Canadian murder suspect
- William Brydges, 4th Baron Chandos (1552–1602), English peer and politician
- William Bridges-Maxwell (1929–1992), Australian politician
- William Bridges Adams (1797–1872), British author and inventor
- William Brydges (organist) (1775–1835), English organist and composer

== See also ==
- William Bridges (disambiguation)
