= King Ralph =

1991 US comedy film by David S. Ward

- Theatrical release poster
- Directed by: David S. Ward
- Screenplay by: David S. Ward
- Based on: Headlong by Emlyn Williams
- Produced by: Jack Brodsky
- Starring: John Goodman; Peter O'Toole; John Hurt
- Cinematography: Kenneth MacMillan
- Edited by: John Jympson
- Music by: James Newton Howard
- Production company: Mirage Enterprises
- Distributed by: Universal Pictures
- Release date: February 15, 1991
- Running time: 96 minutes
- Country: United States
- Language: English
- Budget: $23 million or £8.1 million
- Box office: $52,487,045

King Ralph is a 1991 American comedy film written and directed by David S. Ward and starring John Goodman, Peter O'Toole, and John Hurt. The film is about a fired American lounge singer who becomes the unlikely King of the United Kingdom after an electrical accident wipes out the British royal family.

The story is loosely based on the 1980 novel Headlong by Emlyn Williams. Very little of the story survived the transition to the screen; characters were changed and the story was made into a comedy. The film was a minor box office hit but was received negatively by critics.

== Plot ==
The entire British royal family who are the house of Wyndham is electrocuted and killed in a freak accident outside Buckingham Palace while having a royal portrait taken following a rainstorm. Sir Cedric Willingham leads a search for any surviving heirs to whom to pass the crown. After days of searching, a living heir is found: American Ralph Jones.

Shortly after being fired from his job as a lounge singer in Las Vegas, Ralph is informed by Cedric's assistant secretary Duncan Phipps that he has royal heritage. His grandmother Constance had a brief affair with the first Duke of Warren while a hotel waitress in the US. Constance had a son, Ralph's father. Since the Duke, Ralph's father and grandmother are dead, Ralph is sole heir to the throne. A ring is given as proof, a duplicate of the ring she used to wear that the Duke had given her.

Ralph is flown to London where Cedric gives him a crash course on royal etiquette. On his second day, he goes to a strip club and meets Miranda Greene, a timid exotic dancer and aspiring fashion designer. He dares her to go out on a date with him if the British press proves his claim to the monarchy.

Meanwhile, Lord Percival Graves is opposed to having an American on the throne and attempts to declare the reigning House of Wyndham at an end and replace it with the House of Stuart, of which he is patriarch. Prime Minister Geoffrey Hale states that Ralph's succession is legitimate unless he commits a heinous act. With this in mind, Graves bribes Miranda to stir up controversy by having a public relationship with Ralph.

Despite warnings by Cedric not to commit a mistake similar to that of King Edward VIII, Ralph sneaks out of the Palace to have a date with Miranda in Hyde Park. The next day, she returns Graves' money, but he already has photographs of her with Ralph. To protect Ralph's reputation, Miranda breaks up with him.

Despite Ralph's inability to understand British culture and his awkwardness at formal affairs, he makes a positive impression on King Mulambon of Zambezi during his state visit. They share concerns about the role of leadership they have assumed and the economic interests of their nations. Ralph accumulates a small but loyal following.

It is arranged for Ralph to marry Princess Anna of Finland to continue the royal bloodline and guarantee jobs for the UK in Finland's newly discovered oil reserves in the Baltic Sea. On the night of the Finnish Royal Family's visit, Ralph is sickened by Princess Anna's unusually deep voice, her bizarre sexual preferences, and her nonchalant acceptance of arranged royal marriage.

Miranda attends the royal ball as a set-up by Graves, and photos of her kiss with Ralph are shown to Anna's father King Gustav. This, along with Ralph's impromptu performance of "Good Golly, Miss Molly", results in Finland turning down the UK in favor of Japan for the offshore equipment contract.

Ralph accepts a stern scolding from Cedric and plans to set things right. Miranda confesses her role in the scandal and he cuts off contact with her. Becoming suspicious about his situation, Phipps tells Ralph that Cedric is also an heir to the throne (his great-grandmother, a parlor maid, had a one-night stand with a British prince), but had turned it down.

Ralph addresses Parliament, apologizing for his recent actions. He then informs them he has organized with King Mulambon for Zambezi to purchase £200 million worth of British mining equipment and open three car engine plants in Britain, ensuring jobs for Miranda's family and thousands of other Britons. He then reveals Graves has been sabotaging his succession to the throne and has him arrested for violating the Treason Act 1702. Finally, Ralph announces he will abdicate and reveals Cedric as his successor. He accepts his duty as king, and makes Ralph the third Duke of Warren, with a lucrative annual stipend and his own recording studio in his country estate. Cedric warns that since he has no children, Ralph may have to be king again after Cedric dies.

Ralph marries Miranda and has a son (Ralph II) with her while fronting his own singing group Ralph and the Dukettes. They perform a cover of "Duke of Earl" as the credits roll.

== Cast ==
- John Goodman as Ralph Hampton Gainsworth Jones, a former lounge singer from Las Vegas and heir to the British Throne. Bill Murray was considered for the titular role.
- Peter O'Toole as Sir Cedric Charles Willingham, Ralph's advisor who is another heir to the British Throne.
- John Hurt as Lord Percival Graves, a peer who wants the House of Stuart to succeed the House of Wyndham.
- Camille Coduri as Miranda Greene, an exotic dancer King Ralph falls for.
- Richard Griffiths as Duncan Phipps, Cedric's assistant private secretary.
- Julian Glover as King Gustav, the King of Finland.
- Leslie Phillips as Gordon Halliwell
- Judy Parfitt as Queen Katherine, the wife of King Gustav of Finland
- Joely Richardson as Princess Anna of Finland.
- James Villiers as Prime Minister Geoffrey Hale
- Ann Beach as Miranda's Mother
- Jack Smethurst as Miranda's Father
- Niall O'Brien as Inspector Thomas McGuire
- Leo Jean as Grampy
- Gedren Heller as Punk Girl
- Ed Stobart as Dysentery
- Gareth Forwood as the Duke
- Rudolph Walker as King Mulambon, the King of Zambezi.
- Michael Johnson as Hamilton
- Caroline Paterson as Counter Girl, a girl who works at Burger King.
- Tim Seely as The King of the United Kingdom, Ralph's unnamed predecessor who perishes alongside his family in a photography-based accident.
- Alison McGuire as The Queen of the United Kingdom, the unnamed wife of the King of the United Kingdom who perishes alongside her family in a photography-based accident.
- Chantal Claire, Topaz Hasfal-Schou, and Charlotte Pyecroft as the Dukettes, the backup singers for Ralph.
- Jason Richards as Ralph II, the baby son of Ralph and Miranda, who will be heir to the throne of the United Kingdom.

== Production ==
=== Filming ===
King Ralph was shot in various locations in the United Kingdom. Stand-ins for Buckingham Palace include Wrotham Park, Syon House, Somerset House, Harewood House, Old Royal Naval College, Apsley House, Belvoir Castle, Hagley Hall, Lancaster House, and Blenheim Palace. Warwick Castle and Hever Castle were used to substitute the interior shots for Windsor Castle. St Pancras railway station was used to film the scene introducing the Finnish royal family. Highclere Castle was used for Lord Graves' home. Dalton, South Yorkshire, was the location of Miranda's parents' home.

=== Marketing ===
Universal Pictures launched a marketing campaign for the film, including a partnership with Burger King valued at US$8 million.

== Soundtrack ==
The film's score was composed by James Newton Howard, while the soundtrack features songs performed by John Goodman:

1. "Tiny Bubbles"
2. "Good Golly, Miss Molly"
3. "Duke of Earl"

Other songs featured in the film include:

1. "Good Golly, Miss Molly" by Jeff Lynne
2. "Be-Bop-A-Lula" by Gene Vincent and His Blue Caps
3. "Moulin Rouge" ("It's April Again"; instrumental)
4. "I'm in the Mood for Love"

== Reception ==
=== Box office ===
In the US, the film earned $8.3 million in its opening weekend, in third place. In total, the film grossed $34 million domestically and $52.5 million worldwide against a budget of $23 million.

=== Critical response ===
Review aggregation website Rotten Tomatoes gives the film a score of 29% based on reviews from 14 critics.

Owen Gleiberman of Entertainment Weekly gave the film a C grade, complaining about the entirely predictable jokes, but praising Goodman for his likable performance. Gene Siskel and Roger Ebert of At the Movies gave the film "Two Thumbs Down", with Ebert commenting that "it might have been funnier if John Goodman had played a sleazeball instead of a cuddly nice guy." William Thomas of Empire magazine gave the film two out of five stars, calling it "Poor, even for a 'funny because he's fat' film."
