= King Willem =

King Willem may refer to:

- Willem I of the Netherlands (1772–1843; r. 1815–1840), King of the Netherlands
- Willem II of the Netherlands (1792–1849; r. 1840–1849), King of the Netherlands
- Willem III of the Netherlands (1817–1890; r. 1849–1890), King of the Netherlands

== See also ==
- King William (disambiguation), various monarchs named the English equivalent of Willem
- Willem-Alexander of the Netherlands (born 1967; r. 2013–present), King of the Netherlands
- Willem II (disambiguation)
