= William the Fourth =

William the Fourth may refer to:

- William IV, a list of kings by the name
- William Pitt, 1st Earl of Chatham, satirically called William the Fourth, a leading statesman in the era of King George III
- The fourth book in the Just William series by Richmal Crompton
- PS William the Fourth
