= William II =

William II may refer to:

- William II, Duke of Aquitaine (died 926)
- William II, Marquess of Montferrat (died c. 961)
- William II Sánchez of Gascony (died c. 996)
- William II, Count of Provence (c. 987–1019)
- William II, Count of Besalú (died 1066)
- William II of Normandy (c. 1028–1087), William I of England
- William II of England (c. 1056–1100), commonly referred to as William Rufus
- William II, Count of Burgundy (1061–1125)
- William II Jordan (died 1109), Count of Berga, Count of Cerdanya and Regent of Tripoli
- William II, Duke of Apulia (1095–1127), Duke of Apulia and Calabria
- William de Warenne, 2nd Earl of Surrey (died 1138)
- William II, Count of Nevers (1098–1147)
- William II of Bures (died 1158), Crusader lord of the Kingdom of Jerusalem, Prince of Galilee
- William II of Sicily (1155–1189)
- William II of Béthune (died 1214), nicknamed William the Red
- William II of Perche (died 1226), Bishop of Châlons
- William II of Dampierre (1196–1231)
- William II Longespee (c. 1212–1250)
- William II of Holland (c. 1227–1256), Count of Holland and Zeeland
- William de Wickwane (died 1285), Archbishop of York (1279–1285)
- William II, Lord of Egmond (died 1304)
- William II de Soules (died c. 1320), Lord of Liddesdale and Butler of Scotland
- William II, Earl of Ross (r. 1274–1323)
- William II, Duke of Brunswick-Lüneburg (1300s–1369)
- William II, Count of Hainaut (1307–1345), Count of Holland and Count of Zeeland
- William II of Athens (1312–1338)
- William II, Duke of Jülich (1327–1393)
- William II of Namur (1355–1418)
- William II of Meissen (1371–1425)
- William II of Bavaria (r. 1404–1417)
- William II d'Estouteville (1412–1483), French bishop and cardinal
- William II, Princely count of Henneberg-Schleusingen (1415–1444)
- William II, Duke of Brunswick-Calenberg-Göttingen or William the Younger (1425–1503), Duke of Brunswick-Lüneburg
- William II, Landgrave of Hesse (1469–1509)
- William II de La Marck (1542–1578), Dutch Lord of Lumey and admiral of the Watergeuzen
- William II of Orange (1626–1650), stadtholder of the United Provinces of the Netherlands
- William II of Scotland (1650–1702), William III of England
- William II, Prince of Nassau-Dillenburg (1670–1724)
- William II, Landgrave of Hesse-Wanfried-Rheinfels (1671–1731)
- William II, Elector of Hesse (1777–1847)
- William II of the Netherlands (1792–1849), Grand Duke of Luxembourg and Duke of Limburg
- William II of Bimbia (died 1882), known as Young King William
- William II of Württemberg (1848–1921)
- William II, German Emperor (1859–1941)

== See also ==
- King William (disambiguation)
- Prince William (disambiguation)
- List of people with given name William#Royalty and nobility
- Wilhelm II (disambiguation), lists people named with the German equivalent of William II
- Willem II (disambiguation), lists people named with the Dutch equivalent of William II
