= William Hurst =

William Hurst may refer to:

- William Hurst (MP) for Exeter
- William C. Hurst, Extension Specialist and Professor of Food Science and Technology
- Bill Hurst (born 1970), baseball player
- Bill Hurst (footballer) (1921–2005)
- William John Hurst (c.1829 – 1886), NZ politician
- William Hurst (civil engineer) (1810-1890), Scottish engineer linked to the first railway developments in Britain

== -See also ==
- William Hearst (disambiguation)
