= Guillaume III =

Guillaume III may refer to:

- William II, Count of Eu (died 1096)
- William III, Count of Ponthieu (c. 1095–1172)

== See also ==
- William III (disambiguation), lists people and other objects referred to with the English equivalent of Guillaume III
