= William Arnot =

William Arnot may refer to:

- Sir William Arnot, 7th Baronet (died 1782), of the Arnot baronets
- Sir William Arnot, 9th Baronet (died 1838), of the Arnot baronets
- William Arnot (minister) (1808–1875) Scottish minister

== See also ==
- William Arnott (disambiguation)
