= William Brydges =

Canadian man

William Brydges was a Canadian man whose arrest for murder resulted in the leading Supreme Court of Canada case R v Brydges on the right of a detainee to access duty counsel. His case was a Canadian precedent, and created significant controversy after the Supreme Court of Canada upheld his acquittal. He was found to have been denied access to an attorney because he was not informed of legal services available to him when he told police he could not afford a lawyer. This case had nationwide ramifications, requiring all police officers to advise a person under arrest of the availability of legal services even if they couldn't afford them.

== Arrest ==
William Brydges was arrested on December 16, 1985 in connection with the murder of Mrs. MacLeod, which took place on March 29, 1979. Brydges was 16 at the time of the murder and 22 when he was arrested. Although he was a resident of Alberta, he was arrested in Strathclair, Manitoba while visiting his stepfather.

On December 16, 1985, Detective Harris of the Edmonton City Police and Corporal Munro, a Royal Canadian Mounted Police officer arrested William Brydges. Brydges was brought to the nearest police station (in Manitoba) for questioning.

== Questioning ==
According to the Canadian Charter of Rights and Freedoms, Brydges had the right to talk to a lawyer, and had the right to be informed of this. As outlined in the Charter of Rights, Brydges was first informed of the reason for his arrest. Directly after, the detective said to Brydges: "you can phone one from here if you want. If you know one."

When Brydges said that he did not know any lawyers, Detective Harris asked if he wanted to try to call one. Brydges asked if they had legal aid services in Manitoba, and Detective Harris responded by saying: "I imagine they have a Legal Aid system in Manitoba. I'm...not familiar with it but...."

Brydges then said: "Won't be able to afford anyone, hey? That's the main thing," and said that he did not want to talk to a lawyer at that time.

While being questioned, Brydges admitted to taking some items from the scene of the murder.

== The trial ==
Brydges was tried by the Honourable Allan Wachowich of the Court of Queen's Bench of Alberta, sitting with a jury, from January 12, 1987 to January 20, 1987. The Crown proceeded to introduce circumstantial evidence to the jury until the fourth day, when a voir dire was held to examine the admissibility of statements made by Brydges to the Police. At this time the Trial Judge ruled that Brydges' rights under the Canadian Charter of Rights and Freedoms's section 10(b) had been violated.

Counsel for Brydges then moved that the case be taken away from the jury because there was no evidence upon which a reasonable jury, properly instructed, could return a verdict of guilty. Crown counsel made no submissions in respect of the motion, and the trial judge, after considering the motion, instructed the jury to retire and return with a verdict of not guilty. The jury returned with a verdict of not guilty.

William Brydges' original acquittal was upheld by the Supreme Court of Canada as they agreed with the original trial judge's ruling of throwing out the interrogation evidence under Section 24(2) of the Canadian Charter of Rights and Freedoms. The judge ruled that he was not given his right to a lawyer; instead, he was in essence told that he would only be granted this right if he knew one or could afford one. Due to this violation of the charter, the judge ruled that the admission of the evidence would put the justice system in disrepute.

The evidence was ruled inadmissible because the police had a duty to inform Brydges of legal aid services.

== Appeal ==
The case was later appealed by the Court of Appeal of Alberta, and a new trial was ordered. In the appeal the judge stated that Brydges did not waive his right to a lawyer, instead, due to the context of the conversation between Brydges and the Police, it was agreed that he was merely considering the cost of a lawyer.

Additionally, the judge said that Brydges didn't understand his Charter rights and was not capable of waiving them, since it was the duty of the police to inform him that he had the right to seek legal counsel.
