= William Adam Wilson =

Scottish lawyer (1928–1994)

William Adam Wilson FRSE (28 July 1928 – 14 March 1994) was a Scottish lawyer who served as Professor of Scots Law at the University of Edinburgh. As an author he was known as W. A. Wilson and informally as Bill Wilson.

The University of Edinburgh's W. A. Wilson Memorial Lecture, inaugurated in 1995, is named in his honour.

== Life ==
Wilson was born in Glasgow on 28 July 1928 the son of Anne Adam and Hugh Wilson, her husband. He was educated at Hillhead High School.

He studied law at the University of Glasgow, graduating in 1948 with an MA and again in 1951 with an LLB. He practiced as a solicitor for several years before becoming a lecturer at the University of Edinburgh in 1960. In 1965, he was made a senior lecturer. In 1972, he became the first Lord President Reid Professor of Law at the University. He became Dean of the Law Faculty in 1976.

In 1991 he was elected a Fellow of the Royal Society of Edinburgh. His proposers were Neil MacCormick, Kemp Davidson, Lord Davidson, Michael Yeoman, and John Terence Coppock.

He died in Edinburgh of cancer on 14 March 1994.

== W. A. Wilson memorial lectures ==
- Lord Rodger, (Lord Advocate) (1995) – "Thinking About Scots Law"
- James Gordley (University of California, Berkeley) (1996) – "Contract and Delict"
- Sir Anthony Mason (Chief Justice, high Court of Australia) (1997) – "Negligence and the Liability of Public Authorities"
- Eric Clive (Scottish Law Commission) (1998) – "Law Making in Scotland"
- Joe Thomson (Scottish Law Commission) (1999) – ?
- Keith Ewing (King's College, London) (2000) – "Constitutional Reform and Human Rights"
- Shael Herman (Tulane University) (2002) – "Specific Performance: a Comparative Analysis"
- Horatia Muir Watt (Sorbonne University) (2004) – "European Integration"
- Vernon Palmer (Tulane University) (2007) – "Two Rival Theories of Mixed Legal Systems"
- Lord Hope of Craighead (Lord of Appeal in Ordinary) (2008) – "The Strange Habits of the English"
- Hector MacQueen (University of Edinburgh) (2009) – "Scotland's First Woman Law Graduates"
- Lionel Smith (McGill University) (2010) – "Scottish Trusts in the Common Law"
- George Gretton (University of Edinburgh) (2012) – "On Law Commissioning and Other things"
- Robert Stevens (University of Oxford) (2012) – "Insults"
- Reinhard Zimmermann (Max Planck Institute) (2013) – "Damages in European Contract Law"
- David Snyder (Washington College of Law) (2014) – "Metamophoses in the Law of Contract"
- John Blackie (University of Strathclyde) (2015) – "Historically Informed Law Reform"

== Publications ==
- Trusts, Trustees and Executors (1975)
- Debt (1982)
- Introductory Essay on Scots Law (1984)
