= William Mullins =

William Mullins may refer to:

- William Mullins (Mayflower passenger)
- William Mullins, 2nd Baron Ventry (1761–1827), Anglo-Irish politician and peer
- William D. Mullins (1931–1986), American politician and baseball player
- William W. Mullins (1927–2001), American physicist and materials scientist
- Willie Mullins (born 1956), Irish racehorse trainer and jockey
- Bill Mullins (born 1948), Australian rugby league player
- Bill Mullins (equestrian) (1920–2015), Irish equestrian
