= Bill Kelly (politician) =

Michigan politician (born 1983)

- Born: William Edward Kelly; September 13, 1983 (age 42); Buffalo, New York, United States
- Education: University of Michigan - Flint; Western Michigan University
- Occupation: Politician * Accountant
- Years active: 2002-2007, 2007-Present
- Children: 2

William Edward Kelly III was the Republican candidate for Michigan House of Representatives in the 49th district in 2006. He suffered a defeat at the hands of incumbent Lee Gonzales (D-Flint). Final total was Kelly 24.6%, Gonzales 74.9%.

== Early life ==
Kelly was born in Buffalo, New York and raised in Rochester Hills, Michigan, where he graduated from Rochester High School in 2001.

He graduated from the University of Michigan - Flint, and later attended Western Michigan University in Kalamazoo, Michigan.

In April 2007, Kelly announced his intention to run for Congress in Michigan's 5th district against Dale Kildee (D-Flint). In 2012 he switched his presidential endorsement of US Senator John McCain to former Massachusetts Governor Mitt Romney. Kelly dropped out in his bid for congress, deciding instead to focus on his professional career.

Bill Kelly was elected at the February 2007 Michigan Republican State Convention to serve a two-year term as a member of the Michigan Republican State Committee. He has held a variety of positions with the College Republicans, Young Republicans, and state Michigan Republican Party as well as a member of the Genesee County Republican Party. Bill was elected treasurer of the Michigan Republican Party's 5th district in 2003. He has also served as a Genesee County delegate, State delegate, and precinct delegate.

Kelly has a Bachelor of Business Administration in accounting from the University of Michigan - Flint. While attending The University of Michigan-Flint, he was a contributor to the student newspaper, The Michigan Times . Kelly is a graduate of the Western Michigan University's Haworth College of Business' Masters of Business Administration program, where he served as a representative of the Graduate Students Advisory Committee (GSAC) as well as a senator in the Western Students Association (WSA). As of 2022, he lives in Lansing, Michigan.
