= William Arnaud (philosopher) =

William Arnaud (Latin: Guillelmus Arnaldus) was a Scholastic philosopher and Master of Arts who taught at the University of Toulouse in the 13th century.

There is no agreement on when exactly William lived. His name was a common one, making identifying him from documentary sources difficult. Bertus de Rijk thought that he taught at Toulouse in the 1240s or 1250s. Following this, Stephen Lahey puts him at Toulouse from 1235 until 1244, identifying him with the archdeacon of Lanta and even suggesting that he may be the person of the same name who was elected bishop of Carcassonne in 1248 and died in 1255. On the other hand, René-Antoine Gauthier argued from William's use of Thomas Aquinas that he must have been active in the late 13th century. This conclusion has been generally accepted. In the past, the philosopher has been identified with William of Saint-Amour and the inquisitor William Arnaud, but neither identification is accepted today. All that is known of him—his academic degree and position at Toulouse—comes from his own writings.

William's main works are the Lectura tractatuum, a commentary on Peter of Spain's Tractatus; a series of introductory commentaries on the works of the logica vetus; and commentaries on Aristotle's Prior and Posterior Analytics.

== Bibliography ==
- Brumberg-Chaumont, Julie (2011). "William Arnaud". In Henrik Lagerlund (ed.). Encyclopedia of Medieval Philosophy. Springer. pp. 1393–1395.
- Lahey, Stephen E. (2002). "William Arnaud". In Jorge J. E. Gracia; Timothy N. Noone (eds.). Companion to Philosophy in the Middle Ages. Blackwell Publishing. pp. 678–679.
