= William Wilson (cricketer, born 1912) =

Australian cricketer

Personal information
- Born: c. 1912; Mildura, Victoria, Australia

Domestic team information
- Years: Team
- 1936: Victoria
- Source: Cricinfo, 22 November 2015

William Wilson (born c. 1912, date of death unknown) was an Australian cricketer. He played one first-class cricket match for Victoria in 1936.

== See also ==
- List of Victoria first-class cricketers
