= William of Ramsey =

William of Ramsey (fl. 1219) was a 13th-century English Benedictine monk of Croyland Abbey (sometimes written Crowland), born at Ramsey, Huntingdonshire.

He wrote lives of saints and others in Latin verse, and probably therefore derived his materials from prose then in existence. He can be dated by the content and dedications of his works.

In his life of Earl Waltheof (printed in Francisque Michel's Chroniques Anglo-Normandes) events are brought down to 1219. His Life of St Guthlac is dedicated to Abbot Longchamp, of Croyland, abbot from 1191 to 1236 and that of Birinus is dedicated to Peter de Rupibus, Bishop of Winchester, 1205–1238.

He has sometimes been incorrectly identified with William of Crowland, Abbot of Ramsey and later of Cluny, who died in 1179.

== Works ==
His known works include the following:

- A poem on the translation of St. Guthlac,
- A prose account of the translation of St. Neot (printed in Acta SS., VII July, 330),
- A prose life of St. Waltheof (printed in Michel, "Chroniques anglo-normandes"). (Liebermann ascribes to him other works on Waltheof found in the same manuscript.)
- Life of St. Edmund of Canterbury published by Surius. (Regarded by Baronius as the author)
- Verified lives of St. Fremund, St. Edmund the King, and St. Birinus. (attributed to him by Leland).
