= William Hawkins Wilson =

British physiologist (1866–1956)

Professor William Hawkins Wilson (Oxford 1866 – Cairo 1956) was a British physiologist and a member of the Faculty of Medicine, Cairo, Egypt, from 1895 to 1928, in which latter year he became Professor of physiology and dean of Kasr El Aini Hospital. Professor Wilson contributed to the study of pellagra at the beginning of the 20th century.

Wilson received in early 1903 the Fourth class of the Imperial Ottoman Order of Osmanieh, conferred upon him by the Khedive of Egypt in recognition of his valuable services as Professor at the Egyptian Government School of Medicine.
