= William Rice =

William, Will, Willy, Bill, or Billy Rice may refer to:

== Arts and entertainment ==
- William S. Rice (1873–1963), American woodblock print artist and art educator
- William "Bill" Rice (1931–2006), American artist, writer, actor, and director
- William Rice (food journalist) (1938–2016), American food journalist
- Bill Rice (1939–2023), American songwriter

== Business and industry ==
- William Rice (1788) (1788–1863), American merchant and public servant
- William Marsh Rice (1816–1900), American businessman, founder of Rice University
- William B. Rice (1840–1909), American industrialist from Massachusetts
- W. Thomas Rice (1912–2006), American railroad tycoon

== Law and politics ==
- William Rice (MP) (died 1588), English politician
- William W. Rice (1826–1896), American statesman, representative from Massachusetts
- William Hyde Rice (1846–1924), Hawaiian-American businessman and politician
- William Gorham Rice (1856–1945), American state and federal government official
- William Chauncey Rice (1878–1941), American lawyer

== Religion ==
- William Harrison Rice (1813–1862), American missionary teacher in Hawaii
- William Rice (librarian) (1821–1897), American minister and librarian
- William A. Rice (1891–1946), American-born Catholic bishop in Belize
- Willy Rice, American pastor and president of the Southern Baptist Convention

== Others ==
- William North Rice (1845–1928), American geologist
- William Rice (rower) (1881–1941), American-Canadian rower
- Billy Rice (1938–2008), Irish footballer
- William Craig Rice (1955–2016), American pedagogy expert

== Other uses ==
- Will Rice College, residential college at Rice University, Houston, Texas, U.S.
