= William Aiton (disambiguation) =

William Aiton (1731–1792) was a Scottish botanist.

William Aiton may also refer to:

- William Townsend Aiton (1766–1849), English botanist
- William Aiton (sheriff) (1760–1847), Scottish law agent
