= William Swift (disambiguation) =

William Swift (1848–1919) was the governor of Guam and United States Navy rear admiral

William Swift may also refer to:

- Bill Swift (born 1961), American baseball player
- Bill Swift (1930s pitcher) (1908–1969), American baseball player

== See also ==
- William Swift Daniell (1865–1933), American painter
