= William, Grand Duke of Luxembourg =

William, Grand Duke of Luxembourg or Guillaume, Grand Duke of Luxembourg may refer to:

- William I of the Netherlands (1772–1843; r. 1815–1840), concurrently Grand Duke of Luxembourg
- William II of the Netherlands (1792–1849; r. 1840–1849), concurrently Grand Duke of Luxembourg
- William III of the Netherlands (1817–1890; r. 1849–1890), concurrently Grand Duke of Luxembourg
- William IV of Luxembourg (1852–1912; r. 1905–1912)
- Guillaume V of Luxembourg (born 1981; r. 2025–present)

== See also ==
- William, Count of Luxembourg (1081–1131; r. 1096–1131)
- Prince Guillaume of Luxembourg (born 1963), youngest child of Jean, Grand Duke of Luxembourg
- Guillaume (disambiguation)
- King William (disambiguation)
- Prince William (disambiguation)
