= William Wolfe (disambiguation) =

William Wolfe (1924–2010) was a leader of the Scottish National Party.

William Wolfe can also refer to:

- Billy Wolfe (1896–1963), American wrestling promoter
- William F. Wolfe (1868–1917), American politician

== See also ==
- William Wolff (disambiguation)
- William Wolf (disambiguation)
