= Billy Kelly =

Billy Kelly may refer to:

- Billy Kelly (baseball) (1886–1940), American baseball player
- Billy Kelly (boxer) (1932–2010), boxer from Derry, Northern Ireland
- Billy Kelly (horse), American Thoroughbred racehorse
- Billy Kelly (snooker player) (born 1945), snooker player from Ireland
