= William Wolff (disambiguation) =

William Wolff (1927–2020) was a journalist and rabbi.

William or Bill Wolff can also refer to:

- William I. Wolff, developer of the colonoscope
- Bill Wolff (announcer), staff announcer for WNBC and the NBC network
- Bill Wolff (baseball) (1876–1943), Major League Baseball pitcher
- Bill Wolff (television executive) (born 1966), vice-president at MSNBC and executive producer of The Rachel Maddow Show

== See also ==
- William Wolf (disambiguation)
- William Wolfe (disambiguation)
