= William Handy =

William Handy may refer to:

- William Christopher Handy (1873–1958), American composer and musician
- William Talbot Handy (1894–1983), American Methodist minister
- William Talbot Handy, Jr. (1924–1998), American civil rights activist and United Methodist bishop
- George William Handy (1924–1993), American baseball player
- John William Handy (born 1944), American military officer
- William Handy Ludlow (1821–1890), American politician
- William Handy Onderdonk (1820–1882), American lawyer
