= William Edward Rose =

American businessman and politician

William Edward Rose (1813–1893) founded the Rose Hotel, was a state senator, and a railroad president in South Carolina. He was elected to the South Carolina State Senate in 1868 during the Reconstruction era. He represented York County, South Carolina in the 48th general assembly, and in the 49th.
