= William Arnold =

William Arnold may refer to:

== Military ==
- William Richard Arnold (bishop) (1881–1965), U.S. Army chief of chaplains
- William Howard Arnold (general) (1901–1976), U.S. Army general

== Politicians ==
- William Munnings Arnold (1819–1875), politician and speaker of the New South Wales Legislative Assembly
- William C. Arnold (1851–1906), U.S. representative from Pennsylvania
- William W. Arnold (1877–1957), U.S. representative from Illinois
- William Arnold (bailiff) (1903–1973), bailiff of Guernsey

== Sports ==
- William Arnold (footballer) (1900–1977), English footballer
- Willie Arnold (1881–1957), Welsh rugby international player

== Others ==
- William Arnold (settler) (1587–1676), founding settler in Rhode Island
- William Arnold (master mason) (fl. 1595–1637), master mason in Somerset, England
- William Delafield Arnold (1828–1859), British author and colonial administrator
- William W. Arnold (ornithologist) (1843–1923), American physician and ornithologist
- William Thomas Arnold (1852–1904), English writer and journalist
- William A. Arnold (1904–2001), American plant physiologist and biophysicist
- William Howard Arnold (physicist) (fl. 1955–2004), American nuclear physicist
- William Arnold (film critic), American journalist, author and film critic

== See also ==
- RNLB Sir William Arnold (ON 1025), former RNLI lifeboat in Guernsey
- Bill Arnold (disambiguation)
- Billy Arnold (disambiguation)
- William Arnaud (disambiguation)
