= William Shaw =

William Shaw may refer to:

== Sports ==
- Billy Shaw (1938–2024), American football player
- Billy Shaw (Australian footballer) (1872–1938), Australian rules footballer for St Kilda and Melbourne
- Bill Shaw (footballer, born 1886) (1886–?), Scottish footballer who played for Kilmarnock, Bristol Rovers and Dumbarton Harp
- Bill Shaw (Australian footballer) (1915–1994), Australian rules footballer for Footscray
- William Shaw (cricketer) (1827–1890), English cricketer
- William Shaw (footballer) (1897–?), English footballer
- William Shaw (born 1902–?), English footballer for Barcelona and Northampton Town

== Politicians ==
- William Shaw (Glasgow politician) (died 1937), Scottish trade unionist and Labour Party councilor
- William Shaw (Illinois politician) (1937–2008), American politician
- William Shaw (Irish politician) (1823–1895), Irish Protestant nationalist politician and leader of the Home Rule League
- William Shaw (New Brunswick politician) (1839–1922), farmer, baker and political figure in New Brunswick, Canada
- William T. Shaw (Oregon politician), member of the Oregon Territorial Legislature, 1850
- William Shaw (Quebec politician) (1932–2018), Canadian politician and member of the National Assembly of Quebec, 1976–1981
- William McNairn Shaw (1822–1868), Ontario lawyer and political figure
- William Rawson Shaw (1860–1932), British politician, MP for Halifax, 1893–1897
- William T. Shaw (1879–1965), British member of parliament for Forfar, 1918–1922 and 1931–1945
- William Shaw (MP for Hythe) (c. 1644–1697)

== Others ==
- Bill Shaw, southern gospel tenor with The Blackwood Brothers
- Bill Kennedy Shaw (1901–1979), British desert explorer, botanist, archaeologist and founding member of the Long Range Desert Group
- William Shaw, Canadian inventor and cofounder of IMAX Corporation
- William Shaw (actor) in The Choppers
- William Shaw (agricultural writer) (1797–1853), writer, editor and translator who founded the Farmers Club in 1842
- William Shaw (businessman), president and chief operating officer of Marriott International Inc
- William Shaw (engineer) (1830–1896), Irish-born Australian engineer
- William Shaw (Gaelic scholar) (1749–1831), author of A Galic and English dictionary: Containing all the words in the Scotch and Irish
- William Shaw (laboratory owner), founder of the Great Plains Laboratory, which sells nonstandard laboratory tests
- William Shaw (mathematician) (born 1958), British mathematician
- William Shaw (minister), 18th century British Christian clergyman who founded Barton, Maryland in the United States in 1794
- William Shaw (philosopher) (born 1948), chair of the philosophy department in San José State University
- William Shaw (writer), British journalist and writer
- William Shaw (yacht designer) (1926–2006), American yacht designer
- William Arthur Shaw (1865–1943), English historian
- William Fletcher Shaw (1878–1961), English obstetric physician and gynaecologist
- William H. Shaw (1909–1988), American economist, businessman and government official
- William Hamilton Shaw (1922–1950), United States Navy officer
- William James Shaw (1877–1939), American entrepreneur and philanthropist in the Philippines
- William Smith Shaw (1778–1826), American librarian

== See also ==
- William Shawn, American magazine editor
