= William DeVizia =

American actor

- Born: November 2, 1969 (age 56); Matawan, New Jersey, U.S.
- Occupations: Director, screenwriter, producer, cinematographer, voice actor
- Years active: 1995–present

William DeVizia (born November 2, 1969) is an American director, screenwriter, producer, cinematographer, and voice actor. He directed the 1996 film Almost Famous, the 1997 film Lesser Prophets, and produced the 1998 TV movie FashionKingdom. He also was credited in the 2006 video game Bully as the voice over director as well as the voice actor for one of the greaser characters Vance Medici and an Asylum Inmate. He was also the voice over director for the video game Manhunt 2 and a production team member for Rockstar NYC for Grand Theft Auto IV and an additional voice actor.

== Filmography ==
=== Film ===
Year	Film	Role	Notes
1995	Raising Hell: The Life of A.J. Bannister		Production Manager (Documentary)
1995	Unzipped		Production Manager (Documentary)
1996	The Daytrippers		Special Thanks
1996	Almost Famous		Director
1997	Lesser Prophets		Director (TV Movie)
1998	FashionKingdom		Producer (TV Movie)
2005	Seamless		Additional Photographer and Special Thanks (Documentary)
2014	George Perris Live from Jazz at Lincoln Center for the Performing Arts		Director (TV Movie)
2016	Let Me Down Hard		Director, producer, cinematographer, and Story Writer
2016	Horatio Alger 70th Anniversary		Director, producer, and screenwriter (TV Short documentary)

=== Video games ===
Year	Film	Role	Notes
2006	Grand Theft Auto: Vice City Stories	People of Vice City (voice)	
2006	Bully	Vance Medici/Asylum Inmate (voice)	Also Voice Over Director
2007	Manhunt 2		Voice Over Director
2008	Grand Theft Auto IV	The Crowd of Liberty City (voice)	Also Production Team Member for Rockstar NYC
