= William Kelly (Victoria cricketer) =

Australian cricketer

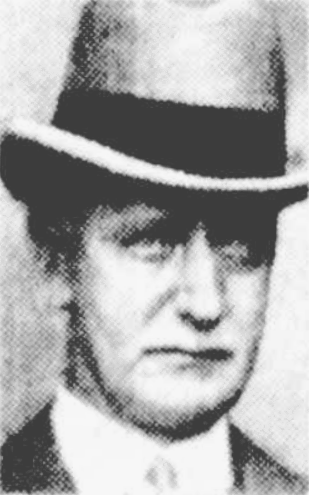

Personal information
- Born: 20 January 1875; Rosedale, Victoria, Australia
- Died: 27 December 1968 (aged 93); Bulla, Victoria, Australia

Domestic team information
- Years: Team
- 1908: Victoria
- Source: Cricinfo, 15 November 2015

William Kelly (20 January 1875 – 27 December 1968) was an Australian cricketer. He played one first-class cricket match for Victoria in 1908.

Kelly played for the Richmond Cricket Club in Victorian district cricket bowling left-hand spin and he topped the clubs bowling average in three seasons. He was also described as a "punishing" batsman. After his playing career he worked in cricket administration serving as chairman of the Victorian Cricket Association and as a member of the national cricket Board of Control. In 1930 he managed the Australian Test team when it toured England and he served as a delegate for the Richmond Cricket Club until 1934.

== See also ==
- List of Victoria first-class cricketers
