= William T. Cefalu =

American physician-scientist

- Education: Southeastern Louisiana University (B.S.); LSU Health Sciences Center New Orleans (M.D.)
- Scientific career
- Workplaces: LSU Health Sciences Center New Orleans; University of Vermont College of Medicine; Pennington Biomedical Research Center; American Diabetes Association

William T. Cefalu is an American physician-scientist. Cefalu is the chief scientific and medical officer of the American Diabetes Association.

== Education ==
Cefalu completed a B.S. from Southeastern Louisiana University and an M.D. from LSU Health Sciences Center New Orleans in 1979. He was a resident in internal medicine and chief resident at University of California, Irvine, Veterans Affairs Long Beach Healthcare System. He conducted a fellowship in endocrinology at David Geffen School of Medicine at UCLA.

== Career ==
Cefalu was the section chief of the joint diabetes, endocrinology, and metabolism program at Louisiana State University School of Medicine. He served as the director of the clinical trials unit at University of Vermont College of Medicine. In 2003, Cefalu joined Pennington Biomedical Research Center as a professor. He has held positions at Pennington including associate executive director and chief scientific officer, and was the executive director. Cefalu held the George A. Bray, Jr. Endowed Super Chair in Nutrition. He was the Gratis Professor in the section of endocrinology, diabetes, and metabolism at LSU Health Sciences Center New Orleans and Douglas L. Manship, Sr. Professor of Diabetes at Pennington Biomedical Research Center. Cefalu became the chief scientific and medical officer of the American Diabetes Association on February 20, 2017.

Cefalu became editor-in-chief of Diabetes Care in 2012.
