= Headlong (Williams novel) =

1980 novel by Emlyn Williams

- First US edition
- Author: Emlyn Williams
- Genre: Alternate history
- Publisher: Heinemann (UK); Viking Press (US)
- Publication date: 1980
- Media type: Print

Headlong is a 1980 alternate history novel by Emlyn Williams.

== Plot summary ==
The story takes place in the United Kingdom in the mid-1930s. During the Silver Jubilee of King George V and Queen Mary in May 1935, the entire British royal family is killed in a freak accident after the explosion of a large dirigible (similar to the Hindenburg disaster), and the search is on to find a surviving heir of British blood. After an extensive search, the choice falls on Jack Green, a 24-year-old stage actor who, unbeknownst to him, is the grandson of the philandering Prince Albert Victor, Duke of Clarence and Avondale, George V's elder brother, and the nearest living heir. He is virtually kidnapped and brought to Buckingham Palace, where he is placed in the care of William Millingham (known as Willie) who is to be his Private Secretary. Millingham assists the new king during a period of adjustment to his new status. He is duly installed as King John II.

After the new king refuses to marry any of several potential queens offered to him, and also makes a speech drawing attention to the problem of unemployment, which is considered highly radical by "The Powers That Be," a plot is discovered to discredit him. At the same time, the King begins to chafe at the rigid, ceremonial routine of royal life and the limitations inevitably placed upon his freedom. He also misses his girlfriend Kathy, who is deeply uncomfortable with him in his new role.

The king decides to try to do some good from the throne. After trying to assert his new-found authority, conservatives led by Cabinet Secretary Sir Godwin Rodd (known as "Sir God"), "suggest" that he abdicate. It is then revealed to him that "Willie" is also a direct descendant of British royalty, but that he refused the position, deferring to Green. After much soul-searching, Jack decides to abdicate, leaving Willie to take the throne as King William V. Jack leaves the palace, his reign of just over 200 days at an end, to be happily reunited with his girlfriend Kathy and go into seclusion in Mexico. Later, he returns to England and writes his memoirs - this book.

== Film ==
The 1991 film King Ralph is a loose, comic adaptation of the novel. John Goodman stars as Ralph Jones, an American lounge singer who improbably becomes the British king.
