= William Moses =

William Moses may refer to:

- William Moses (academic) (1623–1688), English academic and lawyer, Master of Pembroke College, Cambridge
- William Moses (businessman) (born 1962), American businessman and investor
- William A. Moses (1933–2002), American real estate developer
- William Henry Moses Jr. (1901–1991), African American architect, educator
- William R. Moses (born 1959), American actor
- William Stainton Moses (1839–1892), English cleric and spiritualist medium
- William Moses (bishop), Indian religious leader, bishop of Coimbatore
