= William A. Brewer III =

American trial lawyer (born 1955/1956)

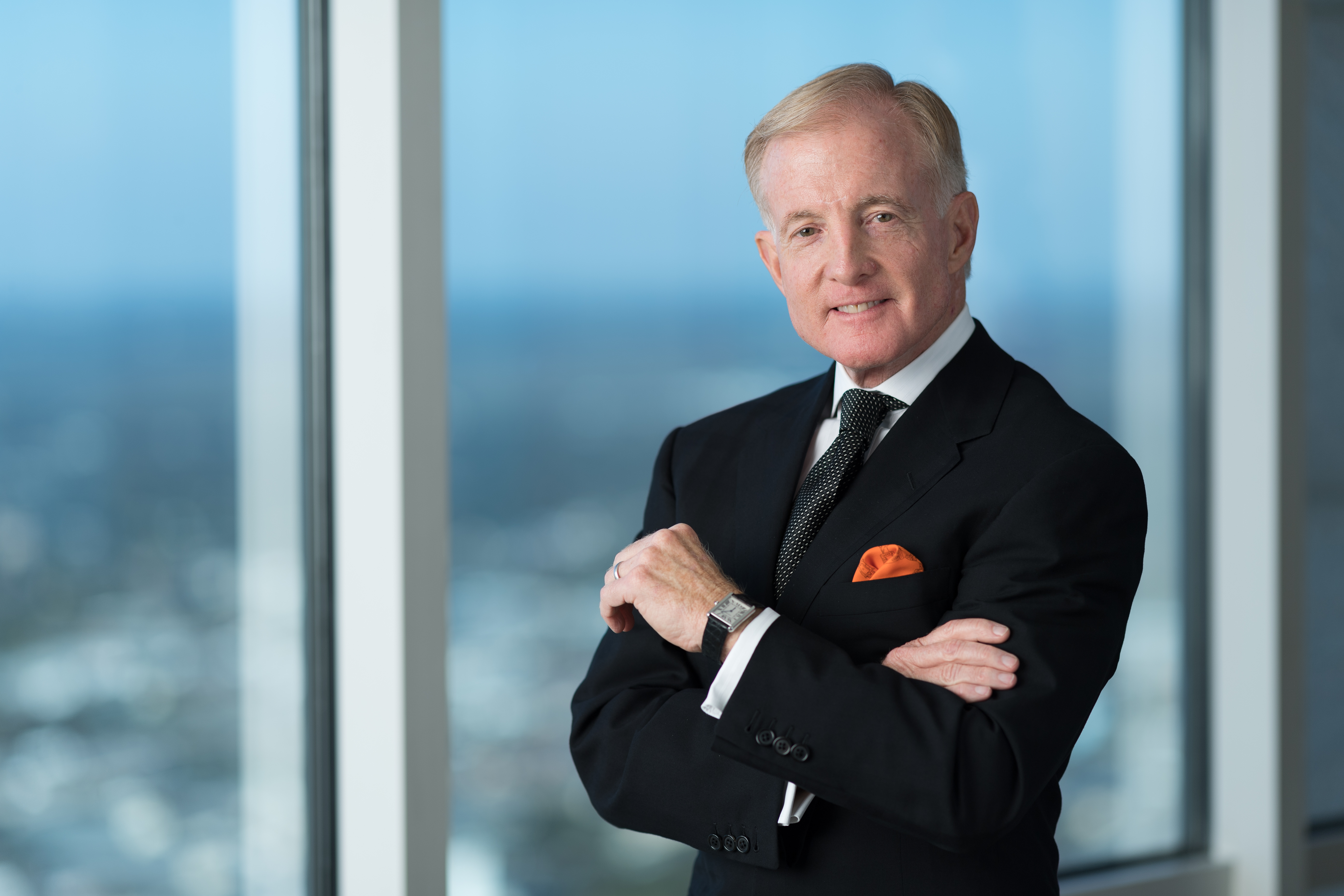
- Brewer in 2017
- Born: 1955 or 1956 (age 70–71); Long Island, New York, U.S.
- Education: St. John’s University; Albany Law School (JD); New York University School of Law (LLM)
- Employer(s): Brewer, Attorneys & Counselors

William A. Brewer III (born 1955 or 1956) is an American trial lawyer. He is a founding partner of Bickel & Brewer, a litigation firm he co-founded in Dallas, Texas in 1984, which is now known as Brewer, Attorneys & Counselors. In the 1980s, Brewer became known for an aggressive style of litigation. Brewer opposed the city of Farmers Branch, Texas on its immigration ordinance for seven years, ultimately resulting in the ordinance being found unconstitutional, and led a series of successful challenges to voting rights laws in Texas. Brewer has served as legal counsel for the National Rifle Association and 3M.

== Early life and education ==
Brewer was born and raised in Long Island, New York, in a large Irish-Italian family. He attended St. John's University, where he majored in drama. Brewer graduated from Albany Law School in 1977 and from New York University School of Law in 1978 with a Master of Laws degree.

== Career ==
In 1978, Brewer began his career in the legal department of the New York Telephone Company during the period just prior to its anti-trust regulation. He moved to Dallas in 1981 and joined the trial team at the firm Kolodey and Thomas. In 1984, Brewer founded a firm in Dallas with John Bickel, a fellow trial lawyer, that would focus on large-scale litigation. Brewer and Bickel became known for an aggressive style of litigation that came to be called “Rambo” tactics in 1980’s Dallas legal circles. Brewer and Bickel opened a storefront office in south Dallas in 1995 to offer pro bono legal services for neighborhood residents. By 1998, Brewer and Bickel had opened satellite offices in New York, Chicago, and Washington D.C.

In December 2009, NY Magazine profiled Brewer and his firm, describing how the firm specialized in high stakes lawsuits, referred to as "bet-the company" lawsuits.

By 2011, Brewer had represented hospitality groups in high-profile cases against management companies including Four Seasons Hotels and Resorts and Marriott.

In 2013, Brewer challenged violations of voting rights in several Texas school districts and city councils, where he argued that Black and Hispanic residents weren’t fairly represented. The Texas Tribune reported in 2018 that Brewer and his firm had prevailed in multiple voting rights challenges.

In 2015, Brewer became the sole named partner at the firm, which changed its name to Brewer, Attorneys & Counselors.

In 2018, questions were raised within the National Rifle Association about Brewer’s fees after his firm billed the organization $24 million over a 13-month period. Brewer was supported by CEO Wayne LaPierre, but concerns over Brewer’s fees caused an internal feud, which ultimately led to the resignation of NRA president Oliver North and other top officials.

== Notable cases ==
In 1997, Brewer represented Dallas Independent School District CFO Matthew Harden in a sexual harassment suit against district superintendent Yvonne Gonzalez that resulted in her resignation.

In 2001, Brewer brought a successful suit against the Dallas school district, claiming it had violated the Texas Open Meetings Act by denying the public access to discussions about redistricting.

In 2007, Brewer brought a federal lawsuit against the city of Farmers Branch, Texas to challenge an ordinance banning rental housing for immigrants who couldn’t prove their legal status. Brewer opposed the city of Farmers Branch on its immigration ordinance for seven years, ultimately resulting in the ordinance being found unconstitutional.

In 2007, Brewer represented Manuel Benavidez, a school board candidate in Irving, Texas, who successfully sued the city over claims that its at-large voting method violated the Voting Rights Act of 1965; the resulting U.S. District Court ruling compelled the city to change its election system in order to give Hispanic residents more proportional representation.

In 2017, Brewer represented David Tyson, the only person of color ever to serve on the board of Richardson Independent School District, in a voting rights lawsuit claiming the district’s at-large electoral system prevented Black and Hispanic residents from having a fair say in school board elections; subsequent negotiations resulted in Richardson’s school district adopting a hybrid system that included five single-member districts.

Brewer represented 3M when it was sued by the state of Minnesota for $5 billion over claims the company had contaminated groundwater through the dumping of PFCs and withheld information about the potential harm of the chemicals from regulators. Brewer called the case an “abuse of power” and it was settled with Minnesota Attorney General Lori Swanson in 2018 for $850 million.

In 2018, Brewer was retained by the National Rifle Association (NRA) to advise the organization after New York state officials challenged the legality of its “Carry Guard” insurance, which protected gun owners in cases of self-defense. On behalf of the NRA, Brewer sued New York governor Andrew Cuomo and other state officials in 2018, claiming officials had engaged in a conspiracy to destroy the organization, resulting in several million dollars of damages. The U.S. Supreme Court ruled in 2024 that the NRA could move forward with its claim that state officials infringed upon the organization’s first amendment rights by discouraging insurance companies and banks from doing business with the organization. Brewer represented the N.R.A. in the ensuing case, National Rifle Association of America v. Vullo, in which the justices ruled unanimously in favor of allowing the N.R.A. to pursue allegations that a New York state regulator had violated the organization’s First Amendment rights by discouraging private entities from doing business with it.

In October 2026, the NRA initiated arbitration proceedings against Brewer and his law firm, Brewer, Attorneys & Counselors, seeking more than $200 million in damages. In an October 30 filing in Dallas County, Texas, the NRA alleged legal malpractice, breach of fiduciary duty and negligent misrepresentation arising from the firm's representation of the organization over more than six years. The NRA accused Brewer and his firm of prioritizing their own financial interests over those of their client and causing substantial financial and reputational harm. Brewer, Attorneys & Counselors disputed the allegations, calling the claims baseless and stating that it would defend its record.

=== Representation of the National Rifle Association ===
Brewer's firm began representing the National Rifle Association (NRA) in 2018, during a period in which the organization faced legal and regulatory challenges. Brewer subsequently became a prominent and controversial adviser to NRA chief executive Wayne LaPierre, advising him on legal strategy, management and public relations.

The firm's legal fees became a source of dispute within the NRA. In July 2019, ProPublica reported that Brewer's firm had billed the organization $24 million over a 13-month period. According to internal NRA documents reviewed by ProPublica, the firm's billings exceeded $97,000 per day during the first quarter of 2019. The Washington Post and The Texas Tribune subsequently reported that the firm's fees had routinely exceeded $1.5 million per month beginning in March 2018.

The fees became an issue during an internal leadership dispute involving LaPierre and NRA president Oliver North. In February 2019, North and NRA vice presidents Richard Childress and Carolyn Meadows asked LaPierre to suspend payments to Brewer's firm until its retainer agreement and invoices could be reviewed. North and Childress later wrote to NRA officials that the Brewer invoices were consuming the organization's cash at what they described as a "mindboggling speed." LaPierre defended Brewer and his firm, saying that their fees were appropriate and that their work was helping the organization address legal and regulatory threats.

Brewer also played a role in the NRA's dispute with its longtime advertising agency, Ackerman McQueen. In April 2019, Brewer filed suit on behalf of the NRA against the agency, seeking information about its expenditures under its contract with the organization. Ackerman McQueen, which was led by members of Brewer's extended family, including his father-in-law, accused Brewer of pursuing the litigation to increase his influence within the NRA. Brewer rejected the allegation and said the NRA had sought financial information from multiple vendors as part of an effort to improve oversight.

Former NRA treasury employee Emily Cummins separately alleged in 2019 that Brewer had interfered with efforts by the organization's accounting staff to examine its financial practices and had pressured employees who questioned his firm's invoices. ProPublica reported that former Brewer employees and correspondence it reviewed provided support for portions of Cummins's account. Brewer's firm disputed her allegations and said that its work for the NRA was justified and of high quality.

The disputes over Brewer's fees and role became part of a broader conflict within the NRA's leadership. The Washington Post and The Texas Tribune reported that Brewer had become one of LaPierre's principal advisers and that former NRA officials and contractors accused him of helping consolidate LaPierre's position within the organization. Brewer rejected those accusations, saying that criticism of his firm intensified after it began examining financial relationships involving individuals who subsequently became critics of the firm's work.

=== Keller Independent School District Litigation ===
In February 2025, Brewer Storefront, the pro bono advocacy arm of Brewer, Attorneys & Counselors, filed a federal lawsuit on behalf of Keller Independent School District parent Claudio Vallejo against the Keller Independent School District and its board of trustees. The lawsuit alleged that the district's at-large system for electing trustees diluted minority voting power in violation of the Voting Rights Act of 1965, and proposed cumulative voting as a remedy.

In January 2026, Chief U.S. District Judge Reed O'Connor dismissed the lawsuit with prejudice, describing the claims as "baseless" and "frivolous." O'Connor subsequently awarded the defendants $284,559.97 in attorneys' fees and costs and held Brewer, attorney Joshua H. Harris, and Brewer Storefront PLLC jointly and severally liable for the award.

In his April 2026 opinion, O'Connor wrote that Brewer's attorneys had spent more than 250 hours investigating a potential Voting Rights Act violation before filing suit but had failed to uncover evidence sufficient to support their claims. The court concluded that Brewer and his co-counsel knew the claims were "objectively baseless" and that "no reasonable litigant could realistically expect success on the merits." O'Connor also examined 18 other voting-rights lawsuits cited by Brewer in defense of the firm's litigation strategy, noting that 14 had ended in settlements. He wrote that the pattern "strongly suggest[ed] political harassment that has no place in our court system." The court admonished Brewer and his co-counsel to pursue non-judicial avenues for political change and warned that using litigation to pressure parties into accepting demands unsupported by law was conduct that "should cease from Brewer and will not be tolerated."

Brewer and Vallejo appealed the rulings to the United States Court of Appeals for the Fifth Circuit. The Texas NAACP filed an amicus brief supporting the appeal, arguing that the claims had been brought in good faith and warning that sanctions against voting-rights attorneys could deter future efforts to challenge alleged voter discrimination. The organization also argued that cumulative voting is a recognized remedy for concerns involving at-large election systems. As of August 2026, the attorneys' fee award remained under appeal.

=== New York Election Litigation ===
Brewer has represented Republican Party organizations, local governments and candidates challenging New York's Even-Year Election Law, which moved many local elections outside New York City from odd-numbered to even-numbered years. After the New York Court of Appeals rejected a state constitutional challenge to the law in 2025, Brewer represented plaintiffs in a federal lawsuit asserting that the law violated the First Amendment and the Voting Rights Act of 1965. Brewer argued that combining local elections with federal and statewide contests would diminish the ability of local candidates to communicate with voters. Supporters of the law maintained that holding elections in even-numbered years would increase voter participation and reduce election-administration costs.

The litigation generated criticism over its cost to local taxpayers and the billing practices of Brewer, Attorneys & Counselors. In July 2026, RiverheadLOCAL reported, based on law-firm invoices and government payment records, that Brewer had billed the governmental plaintiffs $1.91 million in fees, costs and expenses between June 2025 and May 2026. The publication reported expenses including hotel accommodations, banquets, transportation and the rental of Glen Cove Mansion for a litigation strategy meeting.

In September 2026, Democratic members of the Suffolk County Legislature asked New York Attorney General Letitia James to investigate expenditures associated with the litigation, requesting a review of disbursements, contracts, expense reimbursements, credit-card statements and purchase orders. According to Long Island Life & Politics, county records showed that Brewer had billed more than $940,000 before the federal lawsuit was filed and approximately $1.9 million by the time the governmental plaintiffs withdrew from the case. The legislators questioned expenditures that they said included approximately $14,000 for hotel rooms and banquets, $10,000 for the use of Glen Cove Mansion, $37,700 in transportation expenses associated with a strategy meeting, and more than $100,000 billed by William Brewer III to "pursue various matters." They also questioned expenditures for public relations, marketing and government-relations activities associated with the litigation.

Suffolk County Legislator Greg Doroski characterized the litigation as a partisan effort financed by taxpayers and introduced legislation seeking to rescind the county's authorization for the lawsuit and recover its costs. Republican Presiding Officer Anthony Piccirillo defended the litigation as an effort to protect local control over elections and characterized the Democrats' criticism as "political theatre." He said the county had negotiated reduced billing rates and an agreement providing reimbursement for certain expenditures.

Several governmental plaintiffs subsequently withdrew from the federal litigation. The federal challenge nevertheless continued in amended form, with Republican Party committees and individual candidates pursuing a First Amendment claim against members of the New York State Board of Elections.
