= William G. Jacoby =

American academic

William G. Jacoby (born c. 1953) is a political scientist, and former professor at Michigan State University. He was editor in chief of the American Journal of Political Science until 2018 when he resigned following sexual harassment allegations. Both the University of Michigan and Michigan State later found that he had sexually harassed female graduate students, which Jacoby denied. He retired from Michigan State University on January 1, 2019.

== See also ==
- Me Too movement
