= William Bridges =

William or Bill Bridges may refer to:

- William Bridges (author) (1933–2013), American writer and organizational consultant
- William Bridges (general) (1861–1915), commander of the Australian Army's First Australian Imperial Force in 1914–1915
- William Bridges (politician) (died 1714), Member of Parliament for Liskeard and member of the Board of Ordnance
- William B. Bridges (1934–2024), American professor of engineering
- William Bridges (preacher) (1802–1874), Methodist preacher, hat block maker and founder of the Plumstead Peculiar People
- William Thomas Bridges (1821–1894), barrister in British Hong Kong
- Bill Bridges (American football) (born 1947), American football player
- Bill Bridges (basketball) (1939–2015), American basketball player
- Bill Bridges (game designer) (born 1965), American RPG developer and author

== See also ==
- William Brydges (disambiguation)
