= William Wyatt =

William Wyatt may refer to:

- William Wyatt (cricketer) (1842–1908), English cricketer
- William Wyatt (scholar) (1616–1685), English scholar
- William Wyatt (settler) (1804–1886), Australian settler
- William Wyatt (weightlifter) (1893–1989), British weightlifter

== See also ==
- Bill Wyatt (born 1938), Australian basketball player
- Will Wyatt (born 1942), British television producer
- Willie Wyatt (born 1967), American football player
