= William E. Wilson (photographer) =

English photographer (1853–1905)

- Born: 1853; London, England
- Died: October 1905 (aged 51–52)
- Occupation: Photographer
- Spouse: Ellen Alice Brill (d. 1951)

William Ernest Wilson (1853 – October 1905) was an English photographer who made his name by documenting the American South in the late 19th and early 20th centuries. His collection of around 750 photographs, described as "truly impressive", were preserved by the Mobile Historic Preservation Society, the Georgia Historical Society and the University of Georgia's Special Collections.

== Early life ==
Wilson was born in 1905 in London, England, to James N. Wilson, a photographer. He had at least two brothers and four sisters. His family moved to Charleston, South Carolina, when he was two years old. They later moved to New York.

== Career ==
In the early 20th century, Wilson had a photographic studio in Savannah, Georgia. While in Savannah, he was listed in the City Directory as being a landscape photographer, but it is believed he made most of his income from photographing portraits.

== Personal life ==
While living in New York, Wilson married Ellen Alice Brill, with whom he had three sons: Richard, Earnest and William Jr. The family returned to Savannah, where they lived for thirteen years, before moving to Mobile, Alabama, in 1894.

== Death ==
Wilson died in 1905, aged 51 or 52, at Providence Infirmary in Mobile. He was interred in the city's Pine Crest Cemetery. His wife survived him by 46 years and was buried beside him upon her death at the age of 89 or 90.

== Legacy ==
In 1979, Dennis O'Kain published Documenting the Deep South: William E. Wilson, Photographer.

In 1981, the University of Georgia Art Department published the 26-page William E. Wilson: Deep South Photographer.

Images of America's Mobile: Photographs from the William E. Wilson Collection was published in 2001.
