= William Arnott =

William Arnott may refer to:

- William Arnott (biscuit manufacturer) (1827–1901), Australian manufacturer and businessman
- William Arnott (politician) (1832–1907), American farmer and politician
- Bob Arnott or William Robert Arnott (1922–2016), Australian skier
- W. Geoffrey Arnott (1930–2010), British Hellenist
- Sir William Melville Arnott (1909–1999), Scottish academic
- Will Arnott (1999–2024), British boccia player

== See also ==
- William Arnot (disambiguation)
- William Arnett (disambiguation)
