= List of ships named Kaiser Wilhelm II =

Ships named Kaiser Wilhelm II include:

- SMS Kaiser Wilhelm II, a predreadnought battleship built by the German Navy; in service 1900-1922
- SS Kaiser Wilhelm II (1889), a passenger steamer for North German Lloyd, 1889–1908; named SS Hohenzollern from 1900
- SS Kaiser Wilhelm II, a 1902 passenger steamer for North German Lloyd; seized by the United States in 1917; became troop transport USS Agamemnon (ID-3004); scrapped in 1940

== See also ==
- USS U. S. Grant (AP-29), formerly Konig Wilhelm II
