= W. A. Milne =

Australian photographer

William Alexander Milne (died 20 February 1929) was an Australian photographer. Trading under the name W. A. Milne, he had a studio at Bazaar Street in Maryborough, Queensland.

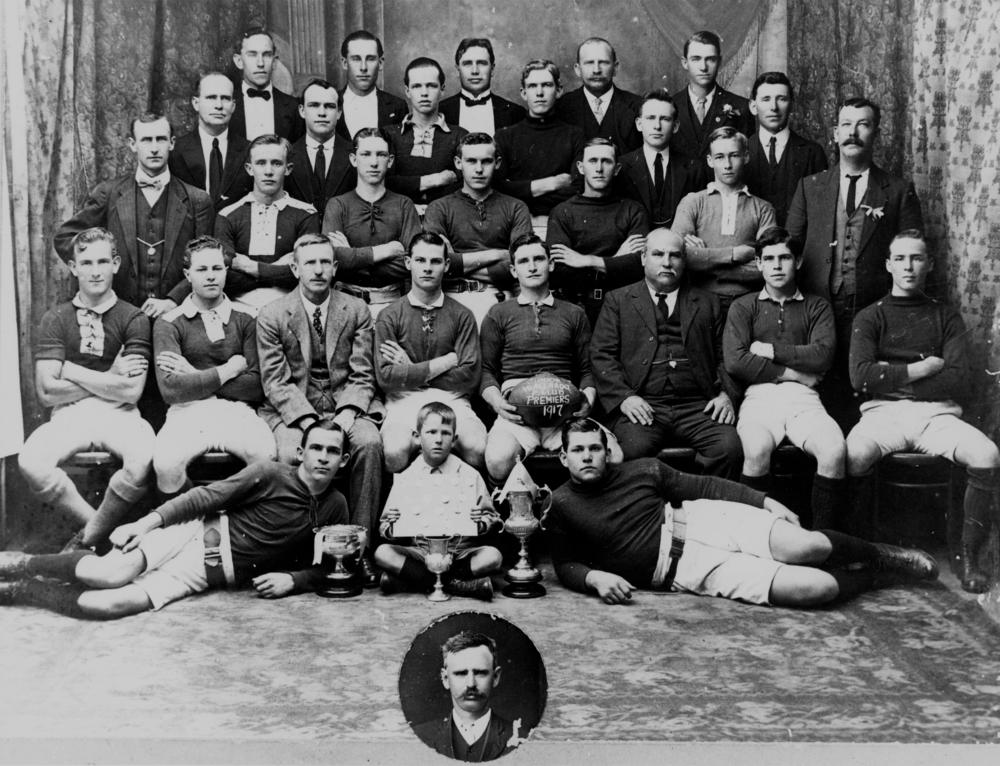
Studio photograph by W. A. Milne of Junior Wallaroo Rugby League Club from Maryborough, 1917

== Personal life ==
Milne was born about 1874 at Glasgow, Scotland. He was married to Mary Fyfe Thom. They had three daughters, Katherine, Mary and Margery.

Milne died on 20 February 1929 at Maryborough and was buried the next day at Maryborough Cemetery.

== Career ==
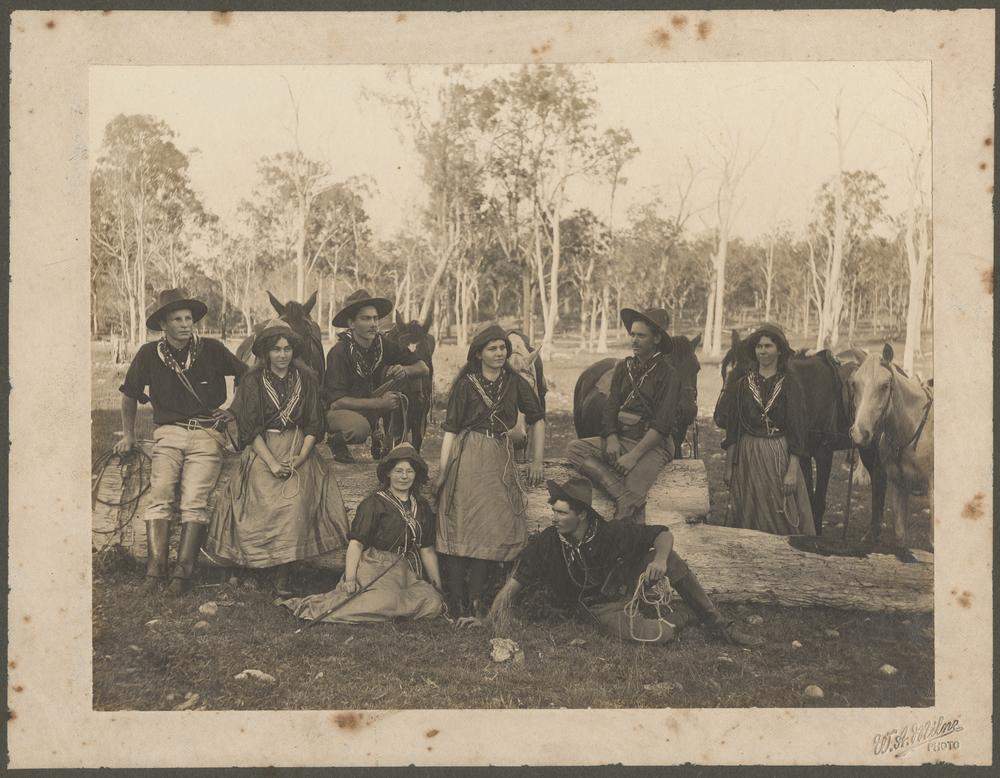
Photograph by W. A. Milne. Wild West troupe in Maryborough, 1913
