= William Bianchini =

Luxembourgish footballer

Personal information
- Date of birth: 16 October 1960 (age 66)
- Positions: Midfielder; striker

Senior career*
Years	Team	Apps	(Gls)
1978–1984?	Red Boys Differdange		
1987?–1990	Jeunesse Esch		

International career
1979–1984	Luxembourg	10	(0)
- * Club domestic league appearances and goals

William Bianchini (born 16 October 1960) is a retired Luxembourgish football midfielder. (Note: William Bianchini at WorldFootball.net) (Note: William Bianchini at National-Football-Teams.com)
