= William Llewellyn =

William Llewellyn may refer to:

- Sir William Llewellyn (painter) (1858–1941), Welsh painter
- William Llewellyn (bishop) (1907–2001), Church of England bishop
- William Llewellyn (priest), Anglican priest
- William H. H. Llewellyn (1851–1927), member of the New Mexico House of Representatives
- Willie Llewellyn (1878–1973), Welsh rugby union player
