= William Kelley =

William Kelley may refer to:

- William Kelley (baseball) (1875–?), American baseball player
- William K. Kelley, deputy White House counsel for the George W. Bush administration
- William Donald Kelley (1925–2005), orthodontist and inventor of alternative cancer treatments
- William D. Kelley (1814–1890), U.S. representative from Pennsylvania
- William Melvin Kelley (1937–2017), African-American novelist and short-story writer
- Bill Kelley (American football) (1926–2015), American football tight end who played for the Green Bay Packers in 1949
- William Kelley (screenwriter) (1929–2003), American screenwriter and producer
- William B. Kelley (1942–2016), Chicago gay activist and lawyer
- William Nimmons Kelley (born 1939), American physician

== See also ==
- William Kelly (disambiguation)
