= William Rush =

William Rush may refer to:

- William Rush (sculptor) (1756–1833), American sculptor
- William R. Rush (1857–1940), American naval officer and Medal of Honor recipient
  - USS William R. Rush
- William Rush (politician) (1919–2000), American politician
- William Rush (actor) (1994–2025), English actor
- William Louis Rush (1955–2004), American journalist and disability rights advocate
