= William Wolf =

William Wolf may refer to:

- William P. Wolf (1833–1896), politician, lawyer and judge from Iowa
- William Wolf (Kansas politician) (born 1935), member of the Kansas House of Representatives
- William Wolf (critic) (1925–2020), American film and theater critic

== See also ==
- William Wolfe (disambiguation)
- William Wolff (disambiguation)
