= William Duane =

William Duane may refer to:

- William J. Duane (1780–1865), Irish-born American politician and lawyer from Pennsylvania
- William J. Duane (Jesuit) (1868–?), Jesuit priest and president of Fordham University
- William Duane (physicist) (1872–1935), American physicist
- William Duane (journalist) (1760–1835), Irish-American journalist and newspaper publisher

== See also ==
- William Duane Benton (born 1950), U.S. judge
- William Doane (disambiguation)
