= William C. Hurst =

Dr. William Calhoun Hurst is an Extension Specialist and Professor of Food Science and Technology in the College of Agricultural and Environmental Sciences at the University of Georgia.

He is credited with developing the first national Good Agricultural Practices (GAPs) short course specifically designed for the fresh produce industry, and was the impetus for developing the Georgia Food Safety Certification Program with the Georgia Department of Agriculture and other entities.

His development of the first Hazard Analysis Critical Control Points (HACCP) short course for the fresh produce industry is recognized internationally, and his development of Georgia's GAPs Food Safety Program is regarded as a model for other states in the country that are working to establish similar programs.

In 2001, the Southeastern Food Processors Association established a scholarship at the University of Georgia in Hurst's name. He is also the 2004 recipient of the D.W. Brooks award.
