= Billy King (sportsman) =

Personal information
- Full name: William Robert King
- Born: 16 December 1902; County Clare, Ireland
- Died: January 1987 (aged 84); Dublin, Ireland
- Batting: Left-handed
- Bowling: Left-arm orthodox spin

Domestic team information
- Years: Team
- 1922: Dublin University
- Source: CricketArchive, 15 December 2007

William Robert King (16 December 1902 – January 1987) was an all-round sportsman who played cricket for both Ireland and the Straits Settlements, and played rugby union for Singapore.

== Biography ==
Educated mainly in County Tipperary, he excelled at sport, particularly cricket and rugby union. He entered Trinity College Dublin in 1921, where he quickly found himself part of the Dublin University Cricket Club, for whom he played a first-class match against Essex in 1922. His sole appearance for the Irish national side came against Wales in August 1923, scoring 45 as Ireland beat Wales by an innings.

Soon after that match, he took up an appointment in Singapore, and eventually played both rugby for Singapore and cricket for the Straits Settlements, playing against the Federated Malay States in 1926. He joined the SSVF Straits Settlements Volunteer Force in 1924, and was awarded the Military Medal for bravery in the Battle of Singapore. He was captured when the city fell in 1942 and spent the remainder of the war working on the Burma Siam railway and in Changi POW camp. He later returned to live in Ireland, and married late in life, having children in his mid 60s.

== See also ==
- List of Irish cricket and rugby union players
