= William Barnett =

William Barnett may refer to:

- William Barnett (engineer) (1802–1865), British engineer
- William Barnett (Georgia politician) (1761–1832), American politician and soldier
- William Barnett (Cambridge University cricketer) (1830–1869), English cricketer
- William Barnett (MCC cricketer) (fl. 1837), English cricketer
- William Barnett, former mayor of Cadillac, Michigan
- William Barnett, fictional character on That '70s Show
- William Barnett, political candidate in Akaroa (New Zealand electorate)
- William Barnett, squatter of Bendigo in Australia
- William A. Barnett (born 1941), American economist
- William P. Barnett (born 1958), American organizational theorist
- William O. Barrnett (born c. 1946), American academic administrator, president of San Francisco Art Institute (1987–1994)
- William O. Barnett, American doctor who developed the Barnett continent intestinal reservoir procedure
- Will Barnet (1911–2012), American painter
- Bill Barnett (born 1956), American football player
