= W. H. Jacoby =

American photographer

William H. Jacoby (1841 – 1905) was an American photographer. A series of his stereoscopic images were published as Jacoby's Artistic Views of Minnesota. The Getty Museum has some of his work in their collection.

His son Charles joined the firm and it became W.H. Jacoby & Son. Many of his images were used for postcards.

== Gallery ==
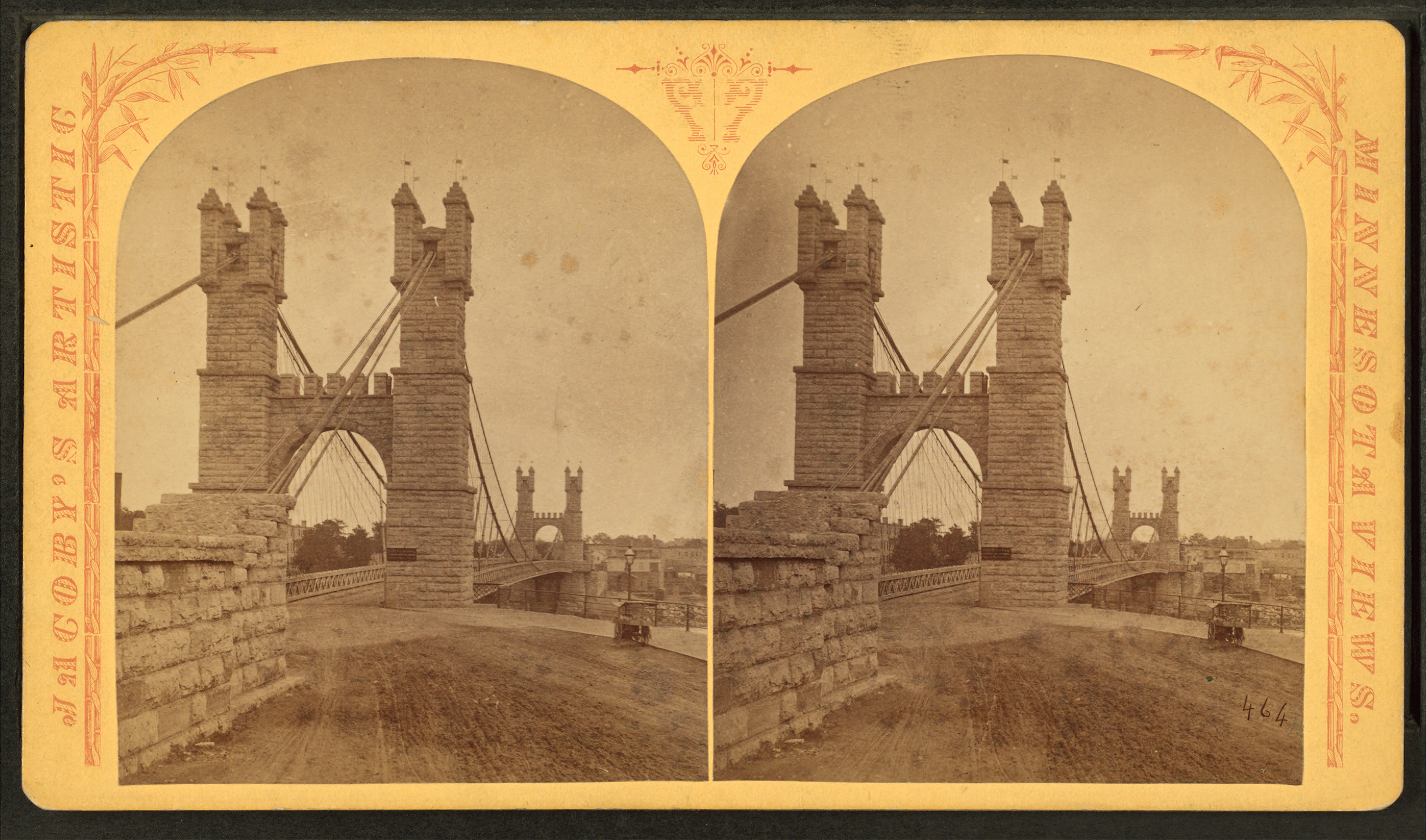
Suspension bridge

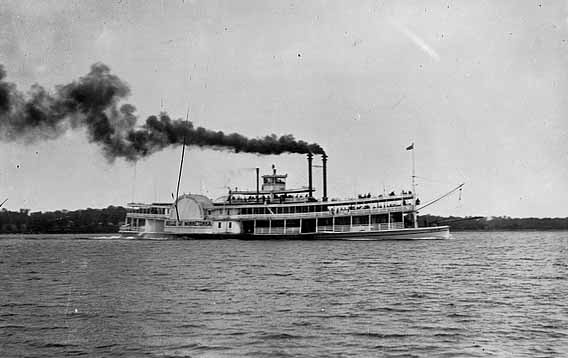
Belle of Minnetonka

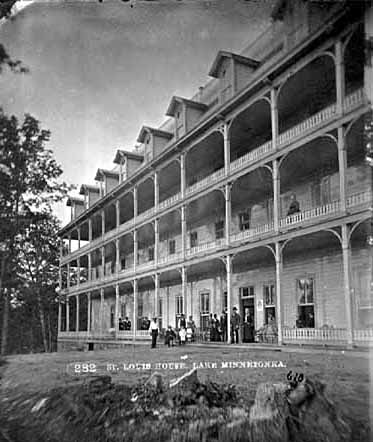
Hotel St. Louis in Deephaven, Minnesota

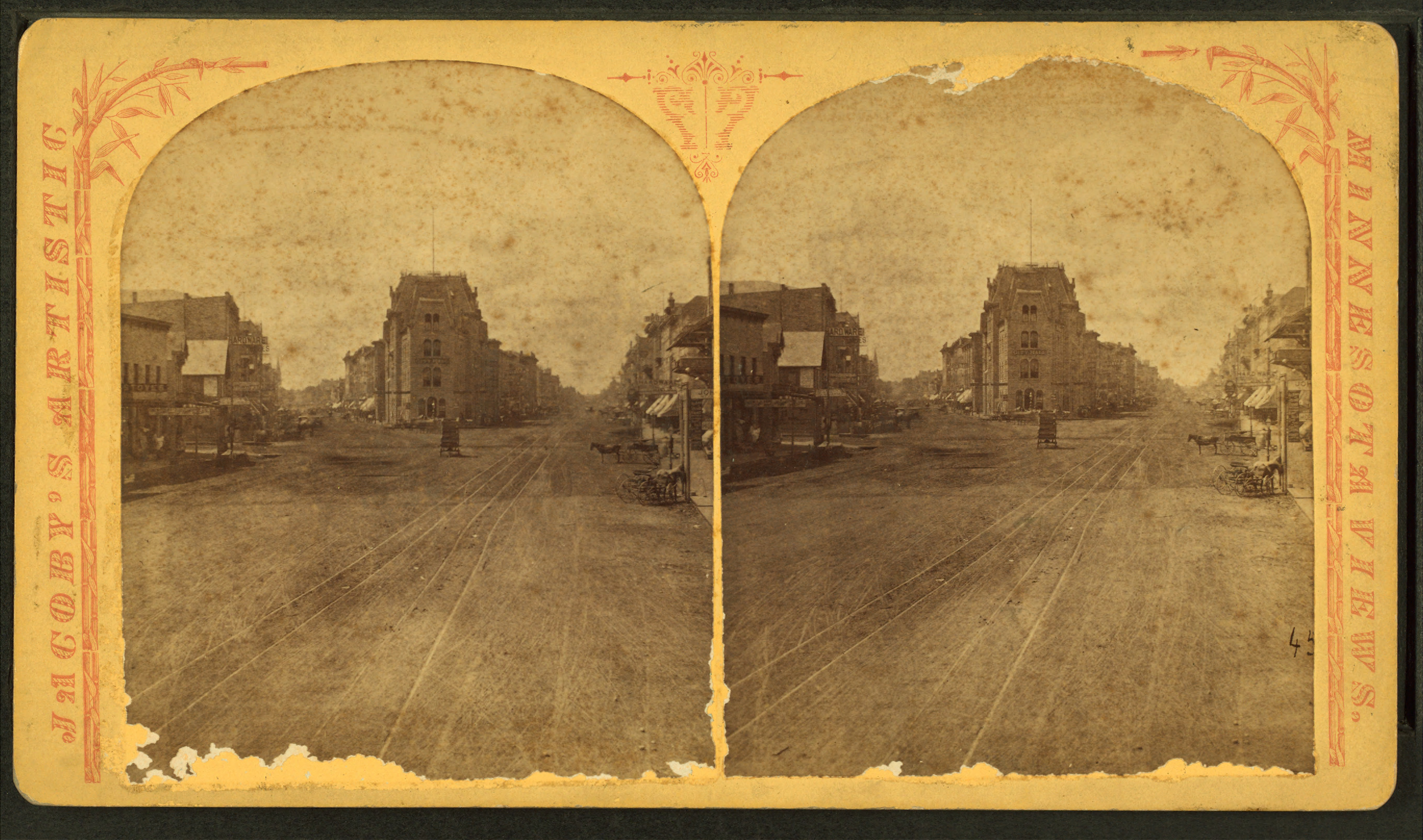
Old city hall on Nicollet Avenue and Hennepin Avenue
