= William Worth (minister) =

William Worth (1745–1808) was a Baptist minister in Daretown, Upper Pittsgrove Township, New Jersey, best remembered in local and church histories for his "apostasy" into Christian Universalism.

== Biography ==
William Worth was born April 21, 1745, in Basking Ridge, New Jersey. He received his education at the Hopewell Baptist School from its founding in 1756 to its discontinuance in 1767. In 1762, sixty acres had been purchased for 80 pounds from John Mayhew, who conveyed title to Jacob Elwell, John Mayhew Sr., and John Dickison in trust for the church. However, the deed was later determined to be defective and in 1809 a second deed was conveyed by John Mayhew, Esq., Sarah Worth (Rev. Worth's surviving widow), Susannah Smith and Lydia Davis, heirs of John Mayhew the elder. In 1771 a dwelling house was built for the pastor.

== Ministry ==
He was the first minister of the Pittsgrove Baptist Church in Daretown. That congregation was formed in 1771, by dismissal (division) from the church at Cohansey. The severance was approved at a meeting April 6, 1771, and signed at a meeting May 9, 1771. Among the members forming the new congregation were John Mayhew Sr., and John Mayhew, likely the father and brother of his wife, Sarah Mayhew.

William Worth was associated with the new Mount Bethel Baptist Meetinghouse in 1767 when it was dismissed (divided) from the Scotch Plains Baptist Church. Rev. Worth and his wife joined the Pittsgrove congregation on May 16, 1771, and he was ordained pastor to that congregation that day.

Worth served as a chaplain of the Second Battalion of the Revolutionary Army troops in New Jersey. He served four years.

Records of his baptisms and marriages at the Pittsgrove Church have been published, and some manuscript records of church governing meetings are available. By one account, he solemnized over 400 marriages.

== Apostasy and reconciliation ==
Worth's Universalist apostasy began in 1788.

The conflict within the Pittsgrove Church sharpened in 1790. "The year 1790 witnessed a revival of the erroneous anti-Scriptural teaching of universal salvation. The movement . . . attracted the attention of many of the English and American ministers simultaneously." The male members of the Pittsgrove congregation followed Rev. Worth, while thirteen women met faithfully in the Baptist practice outside the Church.

In 1803, Rev. Worth was removed as minister of the Pittsgrove Church. Rev. Worth is reported to have recanted as he lay dying in 1808, saying "Universalism can not sustain me in death." After his death on January 2, 1808, he was interred in the Old Pittsgrove Baptist Churchyard beneath a plain marble slab.
