= William Garnett =

William Garnett may refer to:

- William Garnett (civil servant) (1793–1873), British Inspector-general of Taxes
- William Garnett (politician) (1818–1873), MP for Lancaster, 1857–1864
- William Garnett (photographer) (1916–2006), American landscape photographer
- William Garnett (professor) (1850–1932), British electrical engineer
- William John Garnett (1921–1997), British industrial relations campaigner
- Bill Garnett (born 1960), American basketball player
- William Garnett (cricketer) (1816–1903), English cricketer and clergyman
