= William Hearst =

William Hearst may refer to:

- William Randolph Hearst (1863–1951), American newspaper publisher and politician

- William Randolph Hearst Jr. (1908–1993), his son, American businessman and newspaper publisher

- William Randolph Hearst III (born 1949), his son, American heir, businessman and philanthropist

- William Randolph Hearst II (born 1942), grandson of the newspaper magnate, American businessman
- William Howard Hearst (1864–1941), premier of Ontario, Canada, 1914–1919

== See also ==
- William Hurst (disambiguation)
