= King William =

King William may refer to:

== People ==
=== Bimbia ===
- William I of Bimbia (1800–1877)
- William II of Bimbia (d. 1882)

=== British Isles ===
- William of England (disambiguation), including a list of kings with the name
- William the Lion (c. 1142 – 1214; r. 1165–1214), King of Scots

=== Germany ===
- William II of Holland (1227–1256; r. 1247–1256), King of the Romans
- William I of Württemberg (1781–1864; r. 1816–1864)
- William II of Württemberg (1848–1921; r. 1891–1918)

=== Netherlands ===
- King Willem (disambiguation), including a list of kings alternatively named William

=== Sicily ===
- William I of Sicily (1120 or 1121 – 1166; r. 1154–1166)
- William II of Sicily (1153–1189; r. 1166–1189)
- William III of Sicily (c. 1186 – c. 1198; r. 1194)

== Places ==
- King William, Virginia, United States

== See also ==
- King William Ale House, Bristol, England, United Kingdom
- King William Street (disambiguation)
- King William's March, a composition by Jeremiah Clarke
- Prince William (disambiguation)
- Wilhelm I (1797–1888), German Emperor (r. 1871–1888) and King of Prussia (r. 1861–1888)
- Wilhelm II (1859–1941; r. 1888–1918), German Emperor and King of Prussia
- Wilhelmina, Queen of the Netherlands (1880–1962; r. 1890–1948)
- Wilhelmine of Prussia, Queen of the Netherlands (1774–1837), consort of William I, King of the Netherlands
- William, Grand Duke of Luxembourg (disambiguation)
- William I (disambiguation)
- William II (disambiguation)
- William III (disambiguation)
- William King (disambiguation)
