= Brummen =

- Municipality
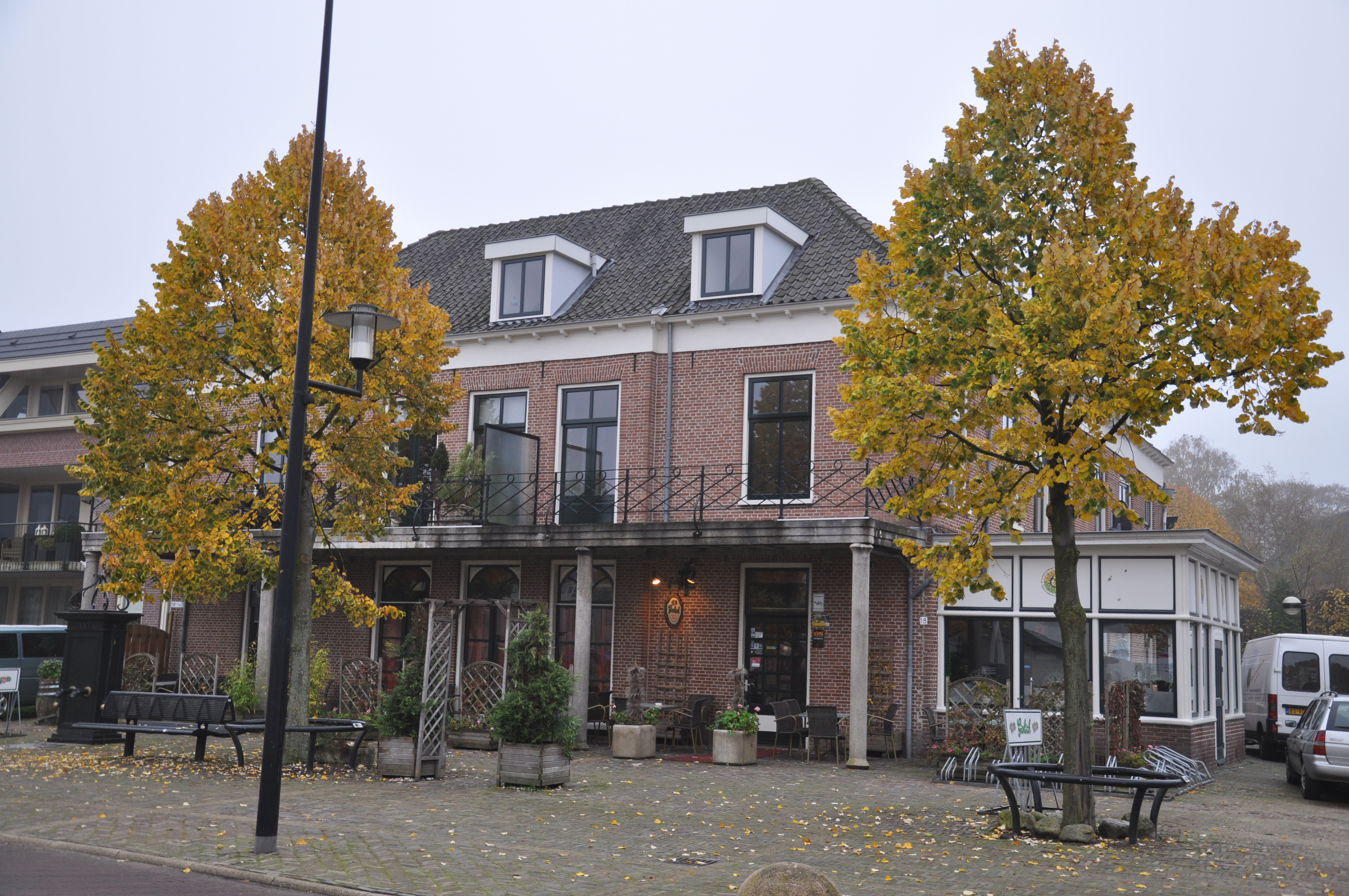
- Square in Brummen

- Flag Coat of arms

- Location in Gelderland
- Coordinates: 52°5′N 6°9′E
- Country: Netherlands
- Province: Gelderland

Government
  - Body: Municipal council
  - Mayor: Jan Nathan Rozendaal (SGP)

Area
  - Total: 85.01 km^{2} (32.82 sq mi)
  - Land: 83.65 km^{2} (32.30 sq mi)
  - Water: 1.36 km^{2} (0.53 sq mi)
- Elevation: 10 m (33 ft)

Population (January 2021)
  - Total: 20,884
  - Density: 250/km^{2} (650/sq mi)
- Demonym: Brummenaar
- Time zone: UTC+1 (CET)
  - Summer (DST): UTC+2 (CEST)
- Postcode: 6960–6975, 7399
- Area code: 0575
- Website: www.brummen.nl

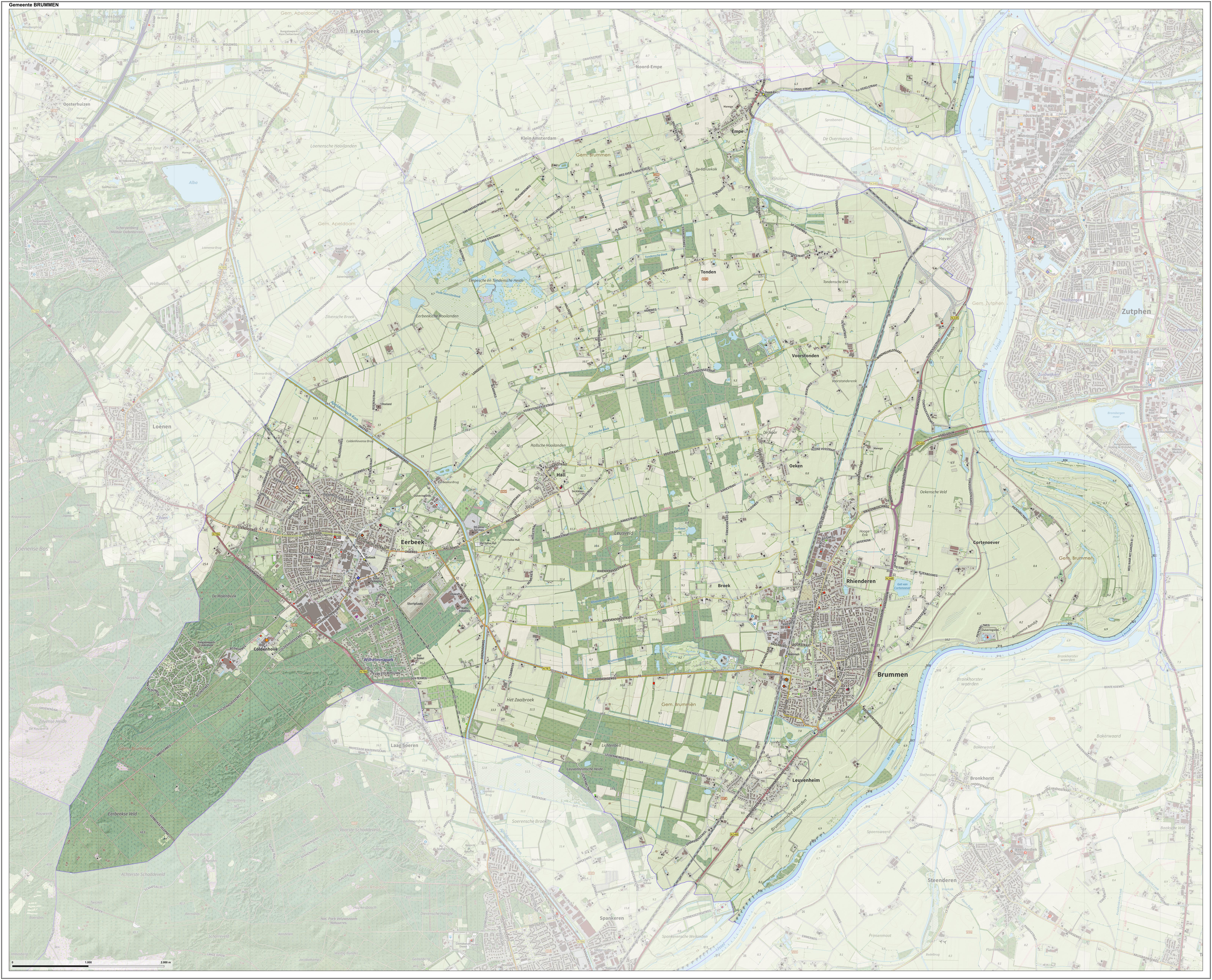
Dutch Topographic map of Brummen, June 2015

Brummen (Dutch pronunciation: [ˈbrʏmə(n)]) is a municipality and a village in eastern Netherlands.

Brummen has a small railway station – Brummen railway station on the line between Zutphen and Arnhem. The village is situated about 7 km (4.3 mi) southwest of Zutphen, no further than 1.5 km from the IJssel river. About two kilometers west of the village, on the edge of the Veluwe forest area, lies the Engelenburg resort, a castle-like house. It is in use as a hotel for golf players and has a 9-hole golf-link.

== Population centres ==
- Brummen
- Eerbeek (the largest village in the municipality)
- Empe (which has a small railway station on the line Apeldoorn-Zutphen)
- Hall - with an interesting chapel dating from the Middle Ages
- Leuvenheim
- Oeken
- Tonden
- Voorstonden

== Transportation ==
- Brummen railway station is served by two trains per hour, serving places such as Zutphen, Dieren, Arnhem and Nijmegen.

== International relations ==
=== Twin towns — sister cities ===
Brummen is twinned with:

Kōriyama, Japan	Krotoszyn, Poland

== Notable people ==
- Jan Elias Nicolaas Schimmelpenninck van der Oye (1836 in Brummen – 1914) a politician
- Cornelis Johannes van Doorn (1837 in Hall – 1906) a civil engineer and foreign advisor to Meiji period Japan
- Jacob Emil van Hoogstraten (1898 in Eerbeek – 1991) a public servant in the Dutch East Indies
- Dick Dolman (1935 in Empe – 2019) a politician

=== Sport ===
- Geurt Schoonman (1896 in Brummen – 1971) a sports shooter, competed at the 1948 Summer Olympics
- Wiljon Vaandrager (born 1957 in Brummen) a former rower, bronze medallist at the 1984 Summer Olympics
- Stefan Groothuis (born 1981 in Empe) a retired speed skater, gold medallist at the 2014 Winter Olympics

== Gallery ==
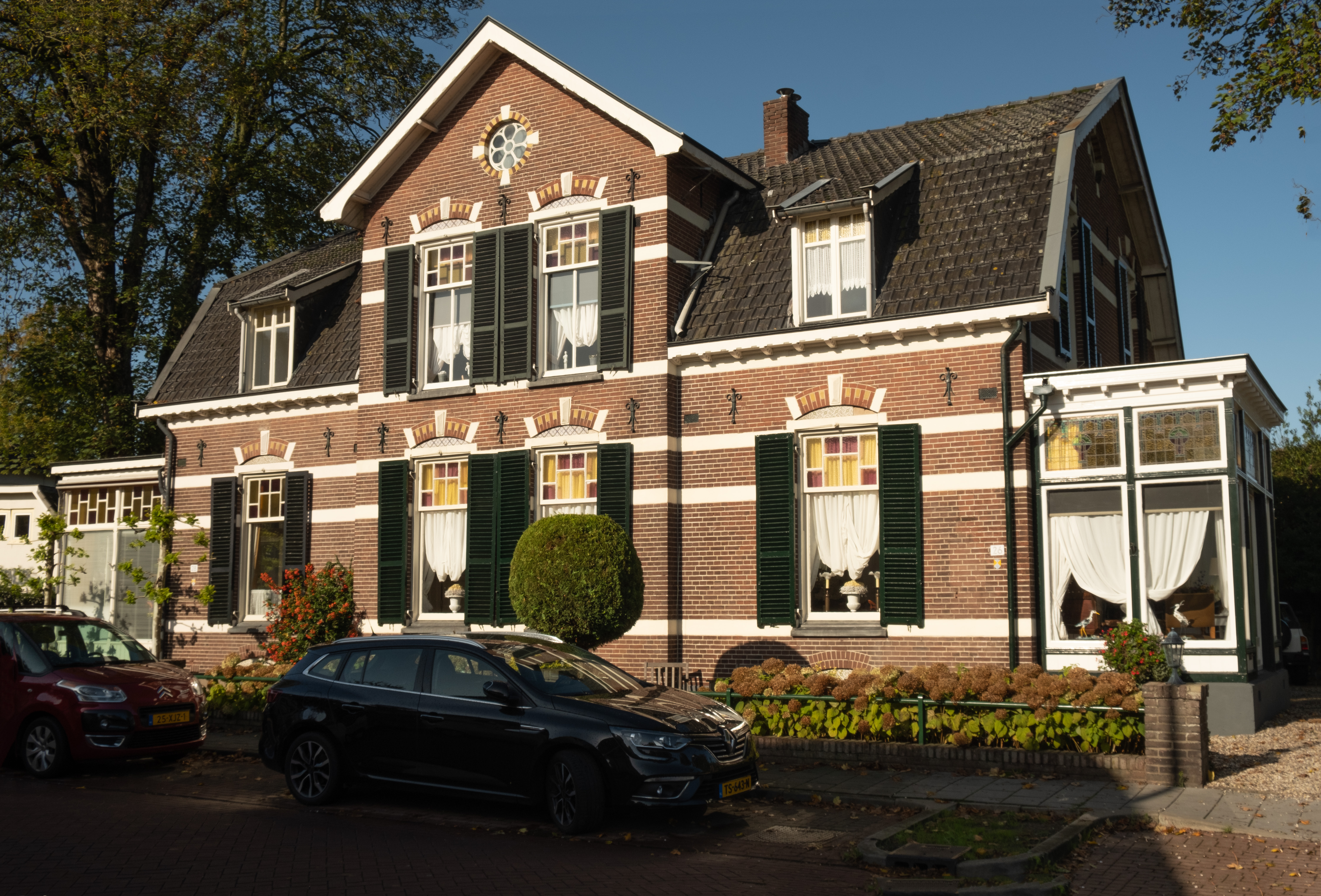
Arnhemsestraat, Brummen

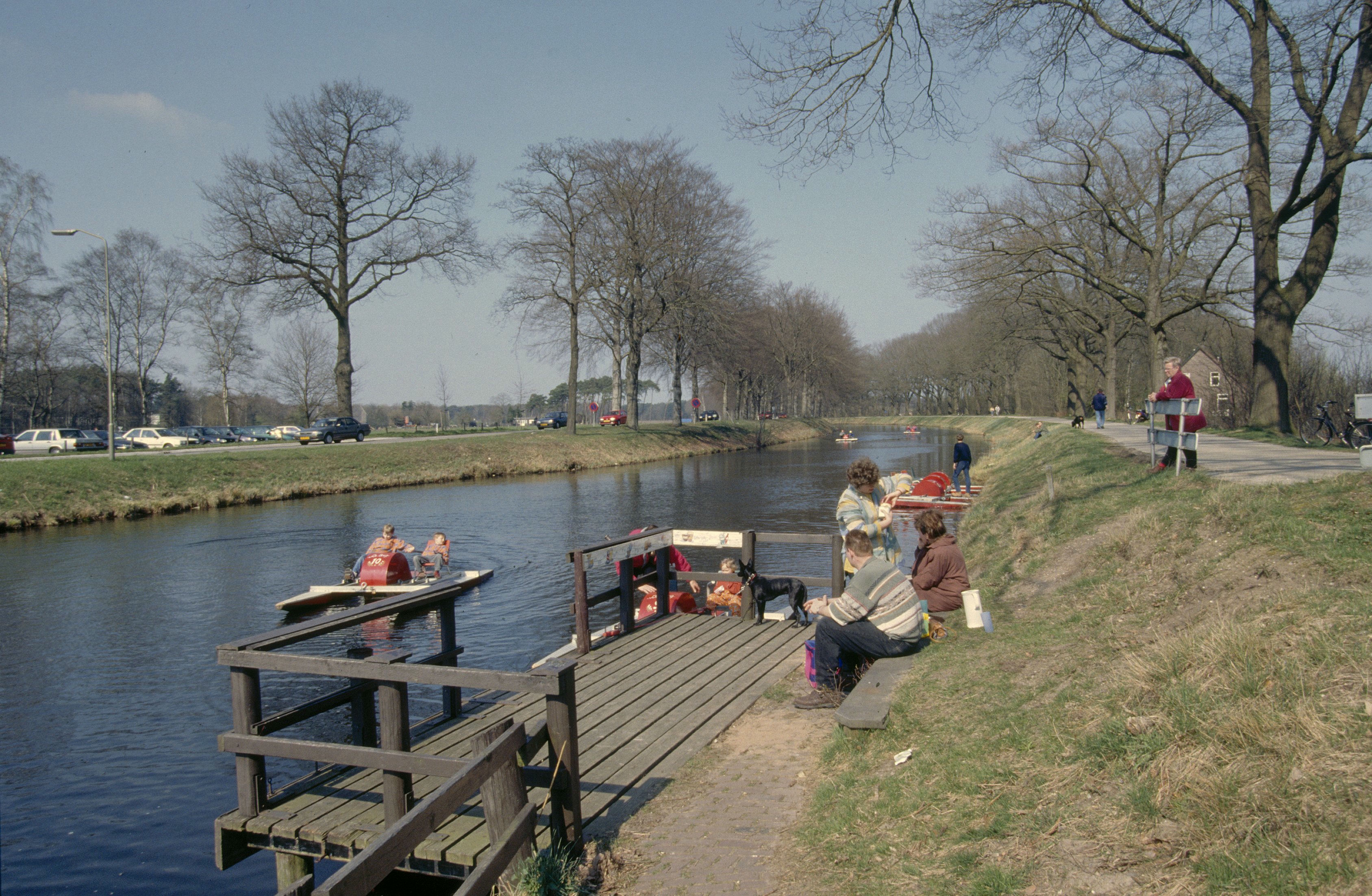
Apeldoorn Canal near the Brummense Bridge - Brummen

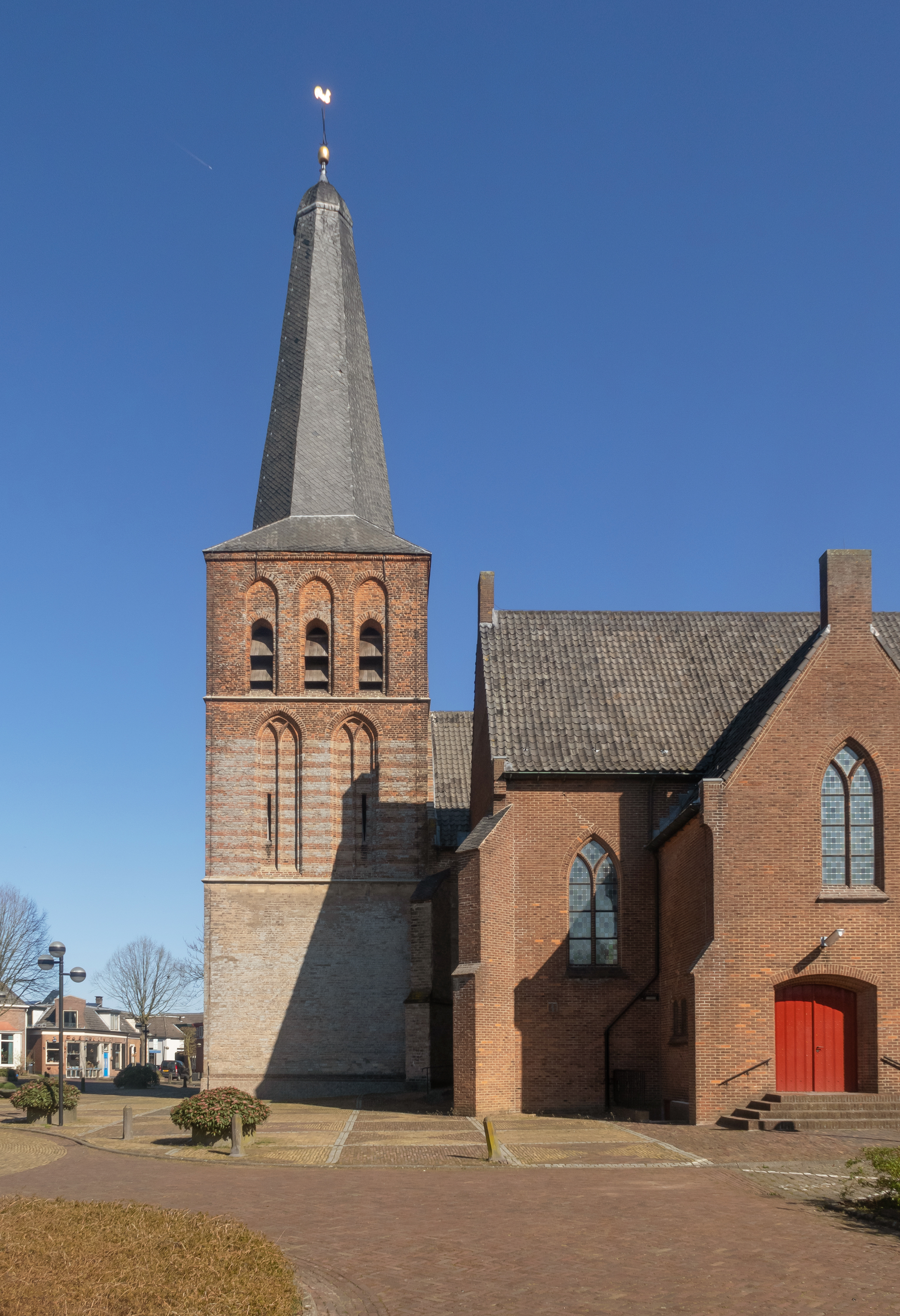
Brummen, church tower (Oude or Sint-Pancratiuskerk)

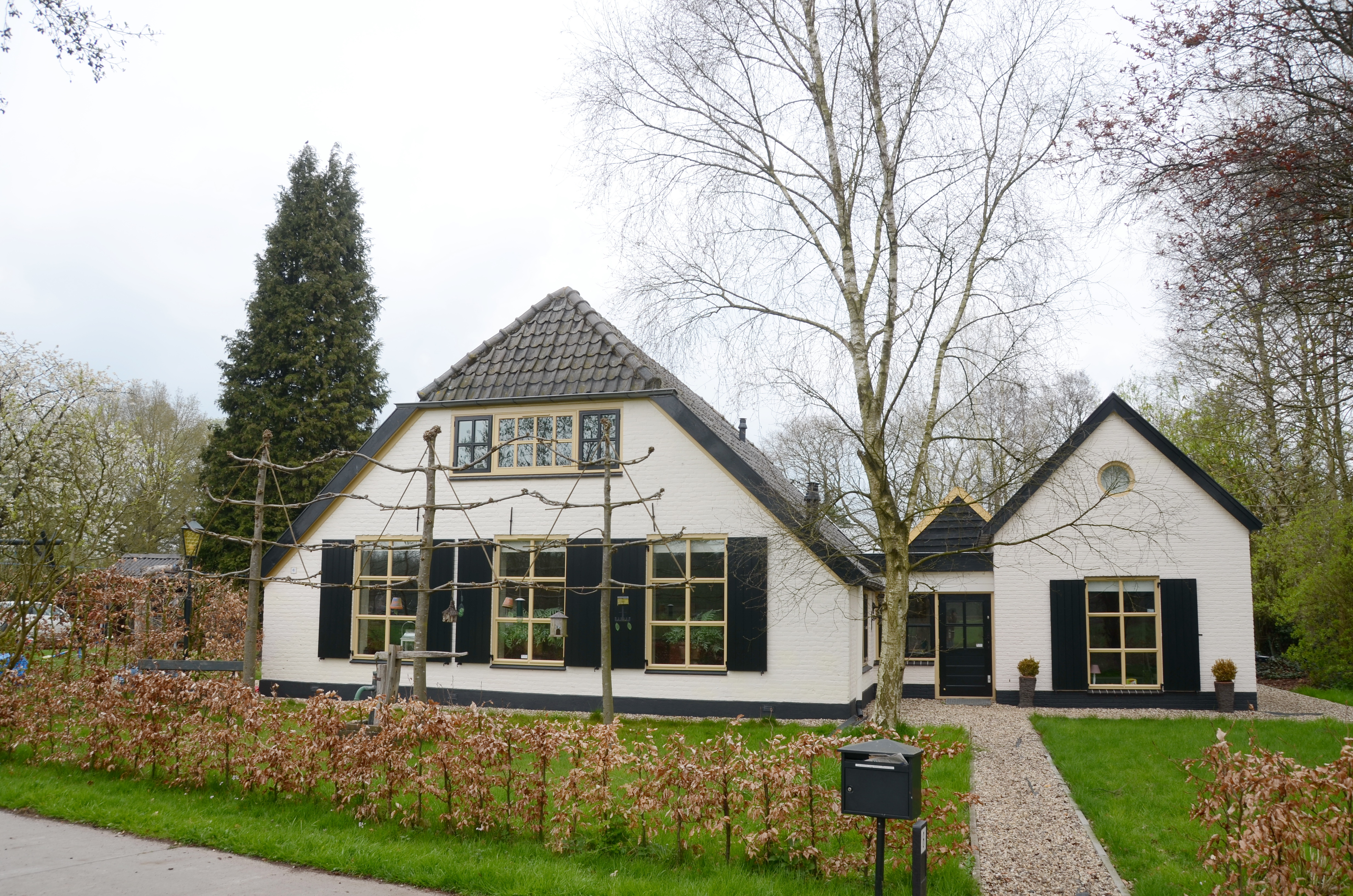
Cottage near Hall

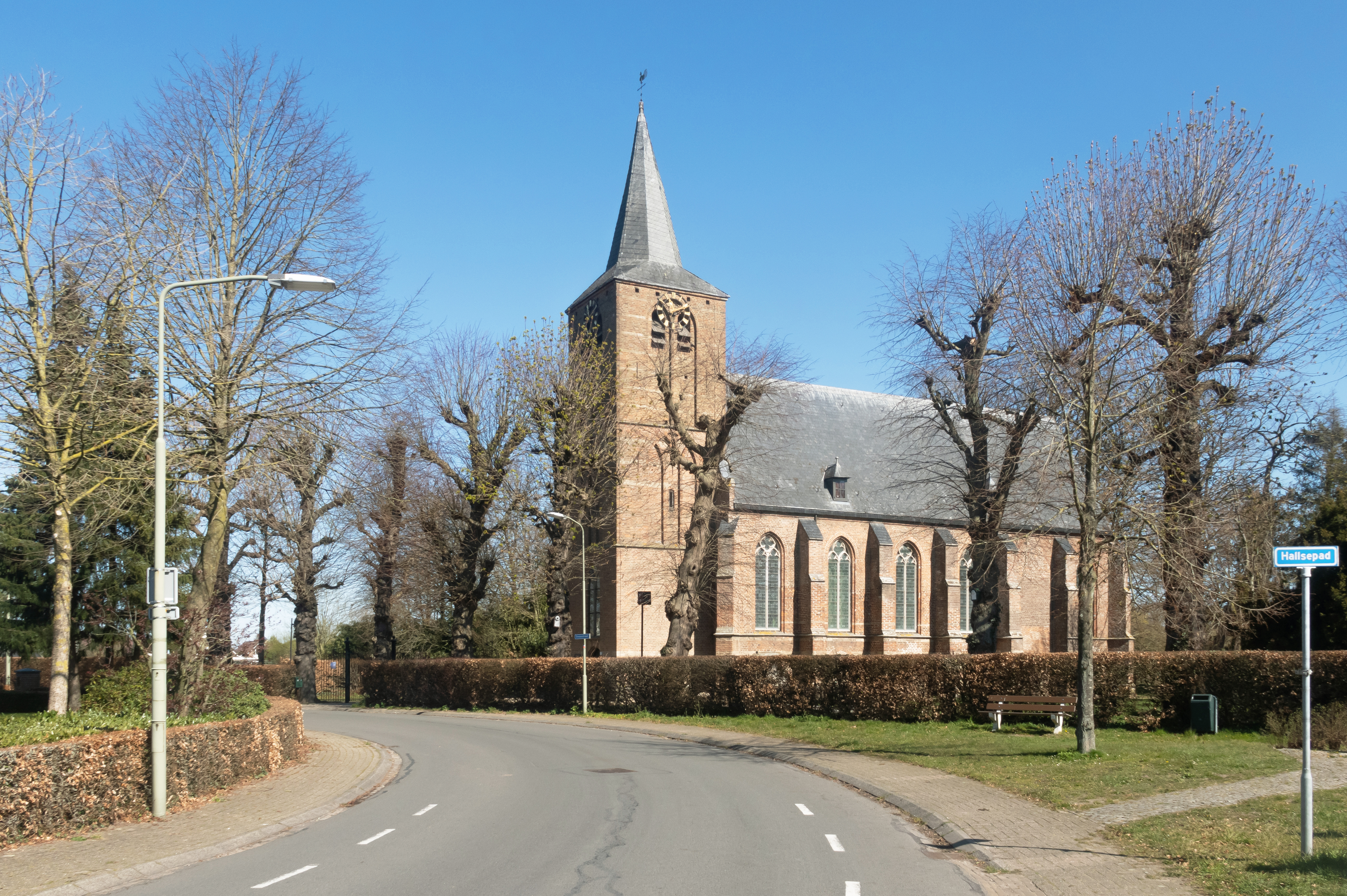
Hall, church: Sint Ludgerkerk

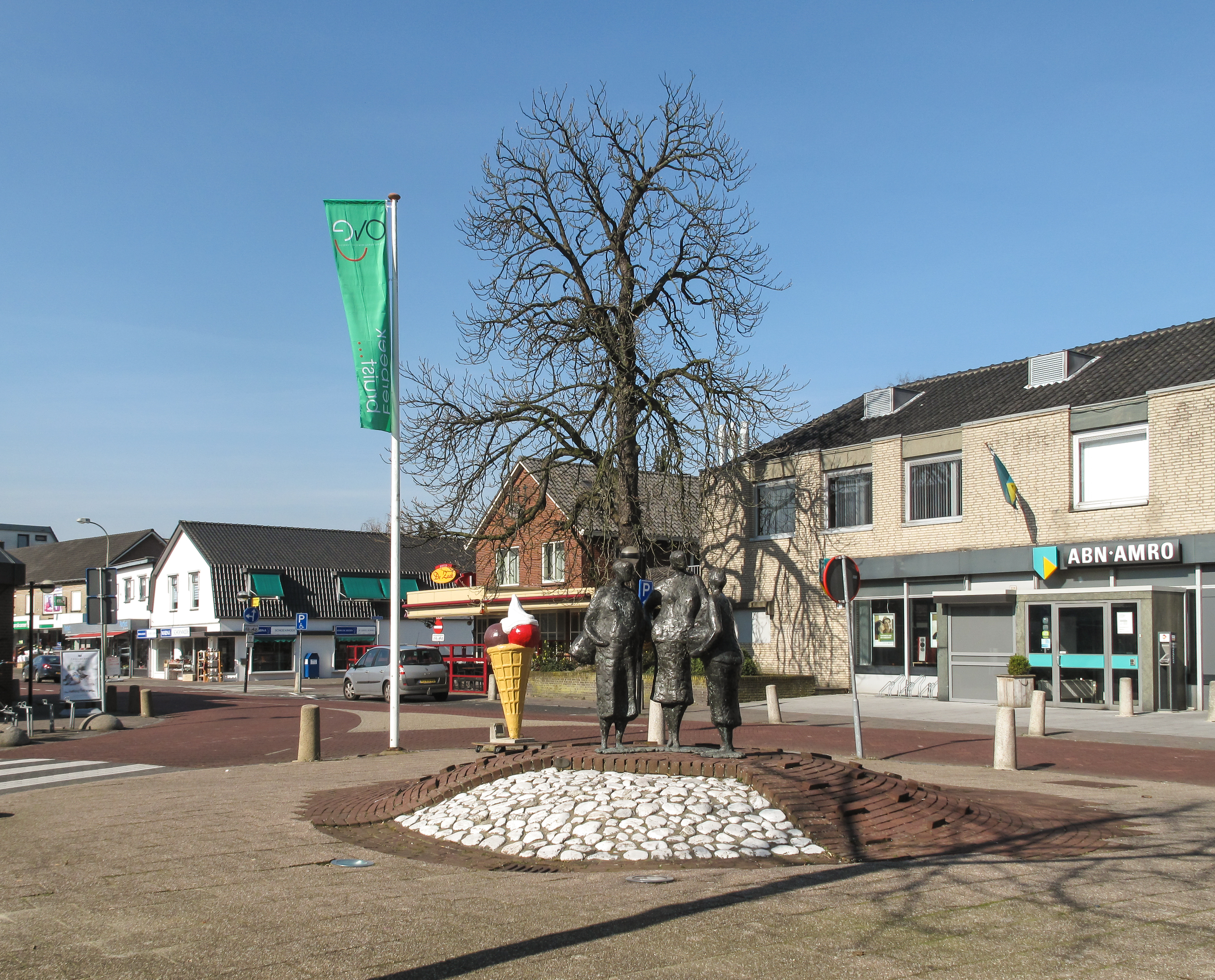
Eerbeek, street view: de Stuijvenburchstraat

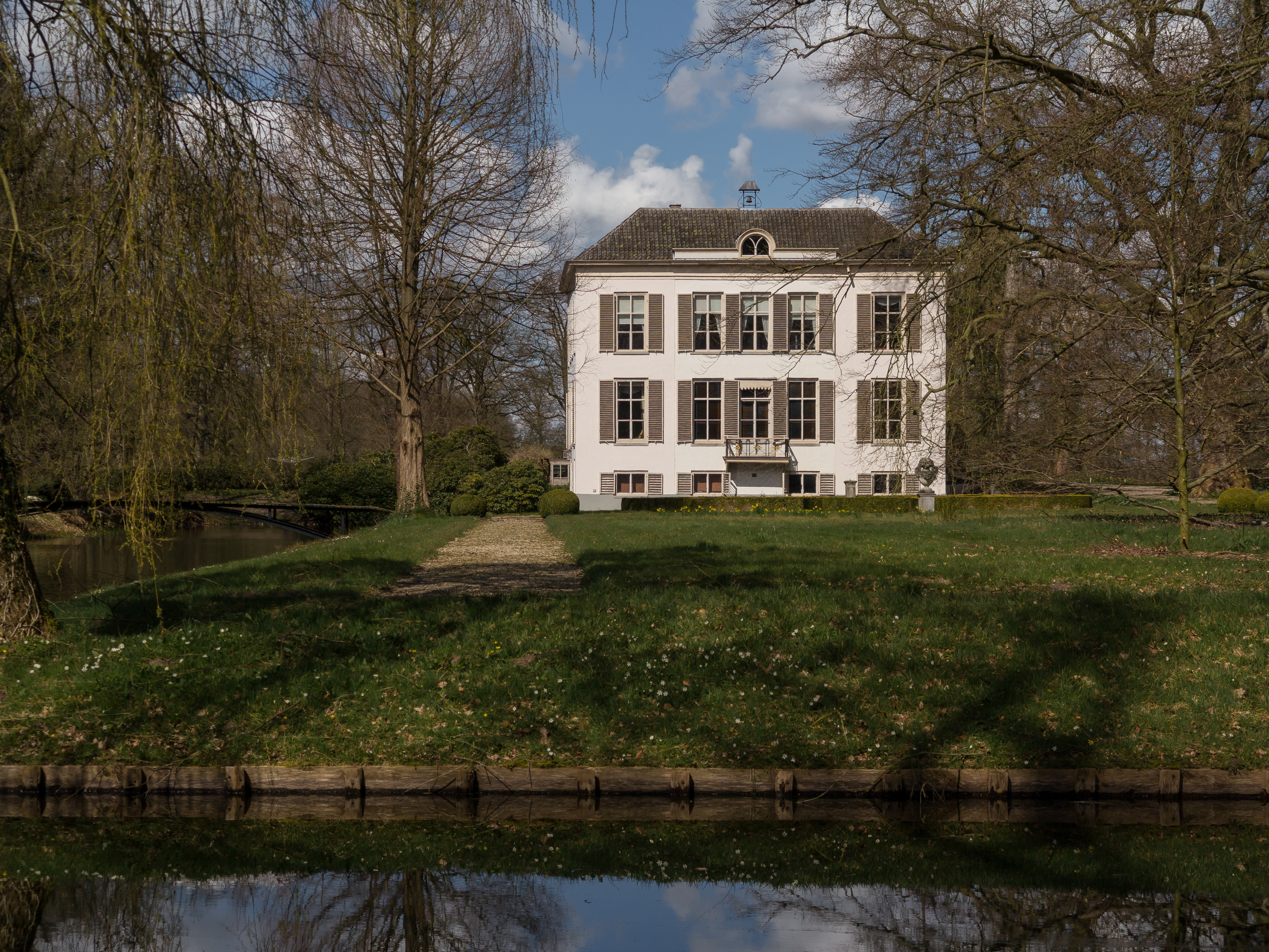
Voorstonden, country house: Huis Voorstonden
