= Anne Zernike =

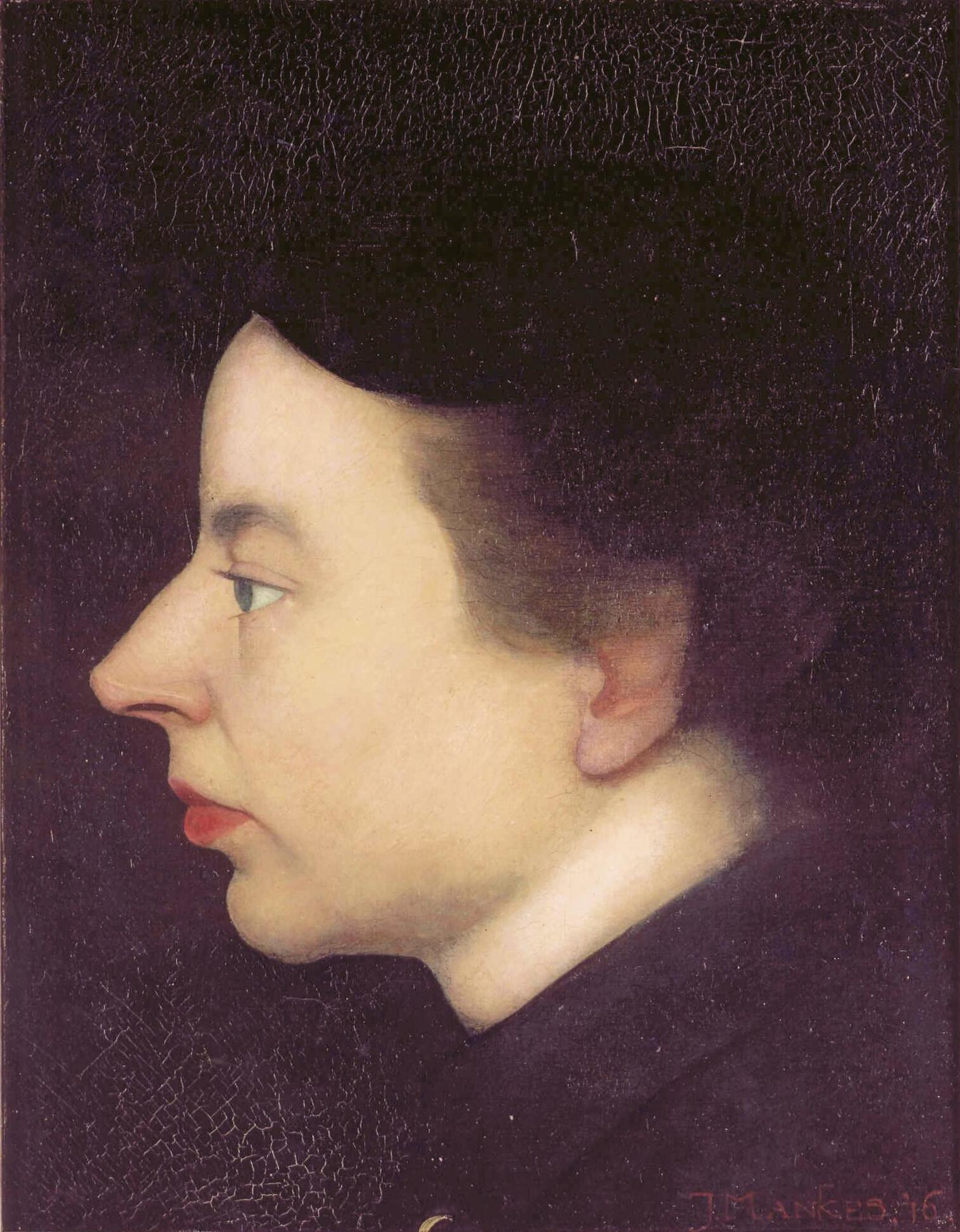
- Zernike by her husband
- Born: 30 April 1887; Amsterdam, The Netherlands
- Died: 6 March 1972 (aged 84); Amersfoort, The Netherlands
- Other name: Anne Mankes-Zernike
- Occupation: minister/theologian
- Years active: 1911-1948
- Known for: first ordained woman minister of the Netherlands
- Spouse: Jan Mankes

Anne Zernike (1887–1972) was a Dutch, liberal theologian, who was the first ordained woman minister of the Netherlands. Though she began her career with the Mennonites, which was the only congregation that allowed female ministers at the time, the majority of her career was spent in the Dutch Protestant Association (NPB).

== Biography ==
Anne Zernike was born on 30 April 1887 in Amsterdam, The Netherlands, to the teachers and mathematicians Antje (née Dieperink) and Carl Friedrich August Zernike. She was raised in a family of intellectuals, including a sister Elisabeth Zernike who became a novelist and a brother Frits who would later win the Nobel Prize for Physics. She completed her primary schooling and attended the High School for Girls on the Keizersgracht. Zernike knew from childhood that she wanted to become a minister and her parents encouraged her to study, though her father did not believe that she would be accepted as a preacher. She began her studies at the University of Amsterdam and because the only denomination which would ordain women was the Mennonite Church, she joined that congregation. Upon completion of her university studies and her baptism at the age of 22, she became eligible to enter the Anabaptist Seminary, and completed her final examinations in 1911.

== Career ==
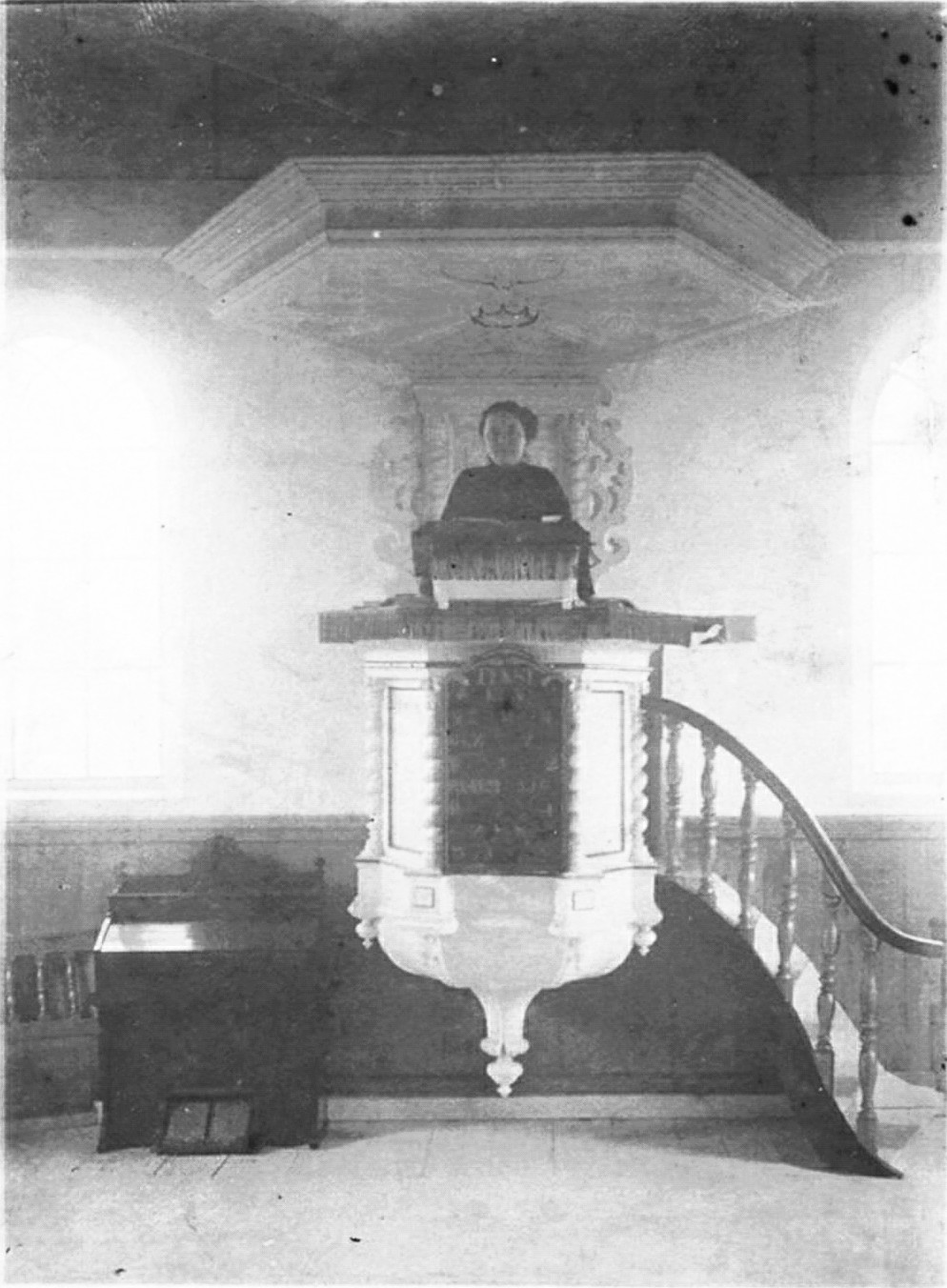
Anne Zernike at her ordination, 5 November 1911

On 5 November 1911 in the Frisian town of Bovenknijpe (today part of De Knipe, near Heerenveen), Zernike was ordained and preached her sermon on Jeremiah 31. She found it difficult to adjust to life in Bovenknijpe and was homesick for culture until she met the painter, Jan Mankes. After a brief courtship, they became engaged and married on 30 September 1915. Shortly thereafter, the couple moved to The Hague where their lives focused on participation in the artistic environment, including literature, painting and poetry; theology, including explorations of Christian Socialism, Taoism and theosophy; and the principals of pacifism and vegetarianism. During this period, Zernike, as was expected at the time, gave up her career for her husband's employment opportunities. As Jan's tuberculosis worsened and a doctor counseled that they relocate away from the damp of the sea and to a forested area, the couple moved in 1917 to Eerbeek. Shortly after they arrived, Zernike discovered she was pregnant and began working on her thesis which she titled, On historical materialism and social democratic ethics. Beint, their son was born on 1 March 1918 and that same autumn, she received her doctorate in divinity from the University of Amsterdam under the direction of Professor H. IJ Groenewegen. Jan succumbed to his illness on 23 April 1920 and Zernike left Eerbeek for Rotterdam the following year.

Zernike returned to the ministry but not with the Anabaptists, as she felt a greater affinity with a more liberal and newly formed church belonging to the Dutch Protestant Association (NPB). There was no building, the 40 church members met in the school gymnasium, and she was given free rein to design the services as she felt led. Thus, she formed a choir and a theater, the congregation visited museums regularly and were apt to discuss Bible verses based on an analysis of paintings by Rembrandt or other artists. By 1929, the congregation had grown and they needed a new space. Joining forces with the Dutch Reformed Church, Lutherans, Mennonites, and Remonstrants, Zernike's congregation formed the Liberal Christian Youth Centre (Dutch: Vrijzinnig Christelijke Jeugd Centrale) (VCJC) and built a church, which they all shared on the riverbank of the Jagerslaan. They called the church the New Covenant and instead of a pulpit, it had a stage in the center of the sanctuary. Under her leadership, the congregation grew to nearly 500 members. She retired from preaching in 1948 but continued writing on theological issues. She published her memoirs in 1956 and remained active throughout the 1960s.

Zernike died on 6 March 1972 in Amersfoort, The Netherlands and was buried with her husband in Eerbeek.

== Selected works ==
- Mankes-Zernike, A (1918). Over historisch materialistische en sociaal democratische ethiek (PhD) (in Dutch). Amsterdam: Kruijt. OCLC 64569265.
- Mankes-Zernike, A. (1920). De mensch en zijn godsdienst (in Dutch). Naarden: In den Toren.
- Mankes-Zernike, A; Roland Holst, R N (1923). Jan Mankes (in Dutch). Utrecht: J.A.A.M. van Es. OCLC 905279512.
- Mankes-Zernike, Anne (1925). Rainer Maria Rilke: een benadering (in Dutch). Rotterdam: De Tijdstroom. OCLC 150308640.
- Mankes-Zernike, Anne (1928). Opvoedingsproblemen. Algemeene bibliotheek (in Dutch). Vol. 35 (2 ed.). Elsevier.
- Mankes-Zernike, Anne (1938). Historische godsdiensten en universeele religie. Geschriften van de Linker Werkgroep van moderne Theologen (in Dutch). Vol. 5. Assen: Van Gorcum & Company. OCLC 905432887.
- Mankes-Zernike, Anne (1956). Een vrouw in het wondere ambt: herinneringen van een predikante (in Dutch). Amsterdam: P.N. Van Kampen & Zoon N.V. OCLC 31342120.
