= Geurt Schoonman =

Dutch sports shooter

Personal information
- Born: 17 December 1896 Brummen, Netherlands
- Died: 19 February 1971 (aged 74) Brummen, Netherlands

Sport
- Sport: Sports shooting

Geurt Schoonman (17 December 1896 – 19 February 1971) was a Dutch sports shooter. He competed in the 50 m rifle event at the 1948 Summer Olympics.
