= Brummen railway station =

Railway station in the Netherlands

Brummen
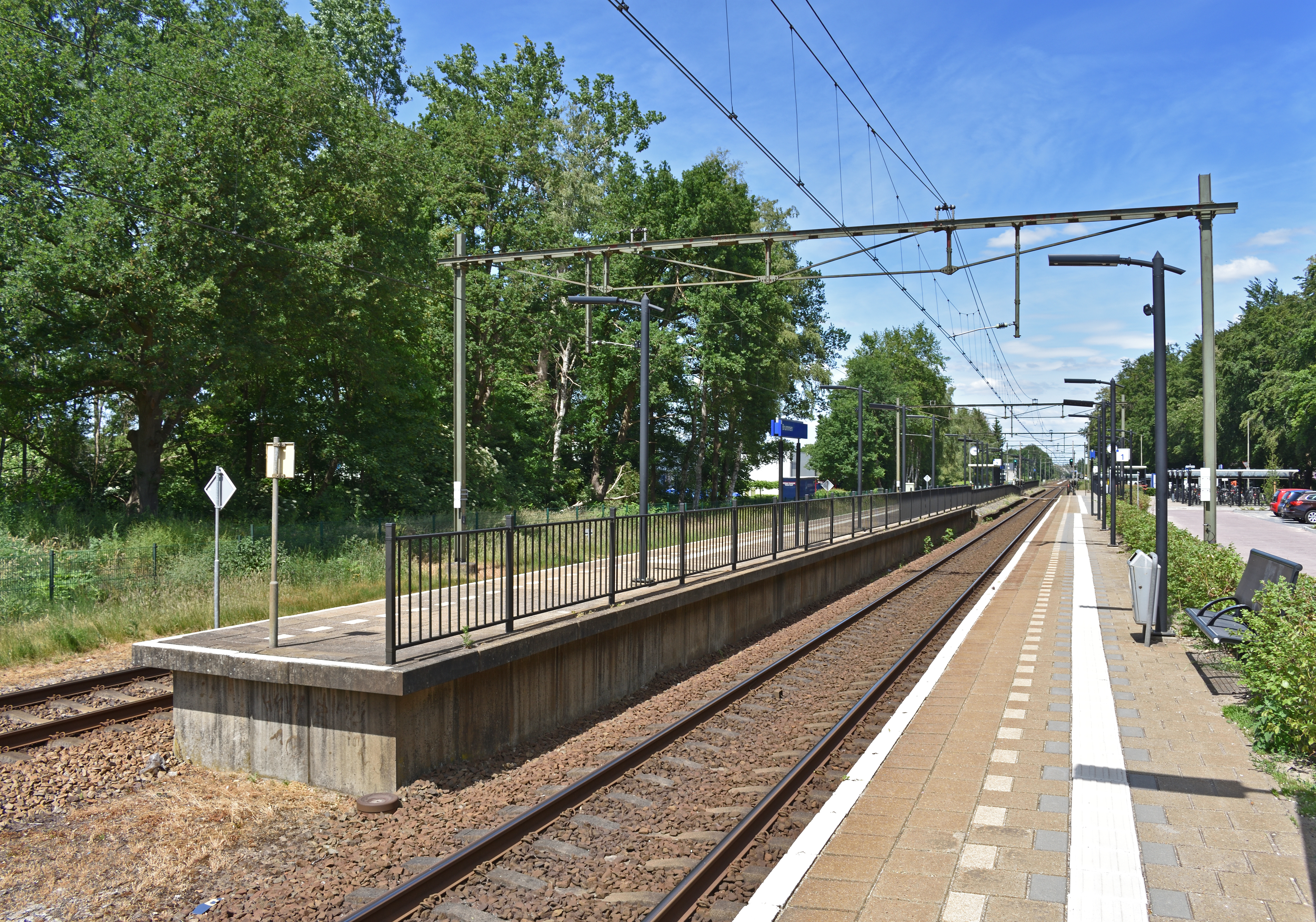
- The station

General information
- Location: Netherlands
- Coordinates: 52°05′27″N 6°08′49″E
- Line: Arnhem–Leeuwarden railway

History
- Opened: 1865

Services
Preceding station	Nederlandse Spoorwegen	Following station
Dieren towards Wijchen	NS Sprinter 7600	Zutphen Terminus
Location
- Location within Netherlands

Brummen is a railway station located in Brummen, Netherlands. The station was opened on 2 February 1865 and is located on the Arnhem–Zutphen railway. The station is currently operated by Nederlandse Spoorwegen. The station closed on 15 May 1938 and 27 September 1944. The station re-opened on 19 October 1940 and 18 May 1952.

== Train services ==
Route	Service type	Operator	Notes
(Wijchen -) Nijmegen - Arnhem - Zutphen	Local ("Sprinter")	NS	2x per hour - 1x per hour after 22:00 and on Sundays.

== Bus services ==
Line	Route	Operator	Notes
503	Eerbeek - Brummen	Syntus Gelderland	Mon-Fri during daytime hours only.
515	Zutphen - Brummen - Leuvenheim	Syntus Gelderland	Mon-Sat during daytime hours only.
