= Jan Mankes =

Dutch painter

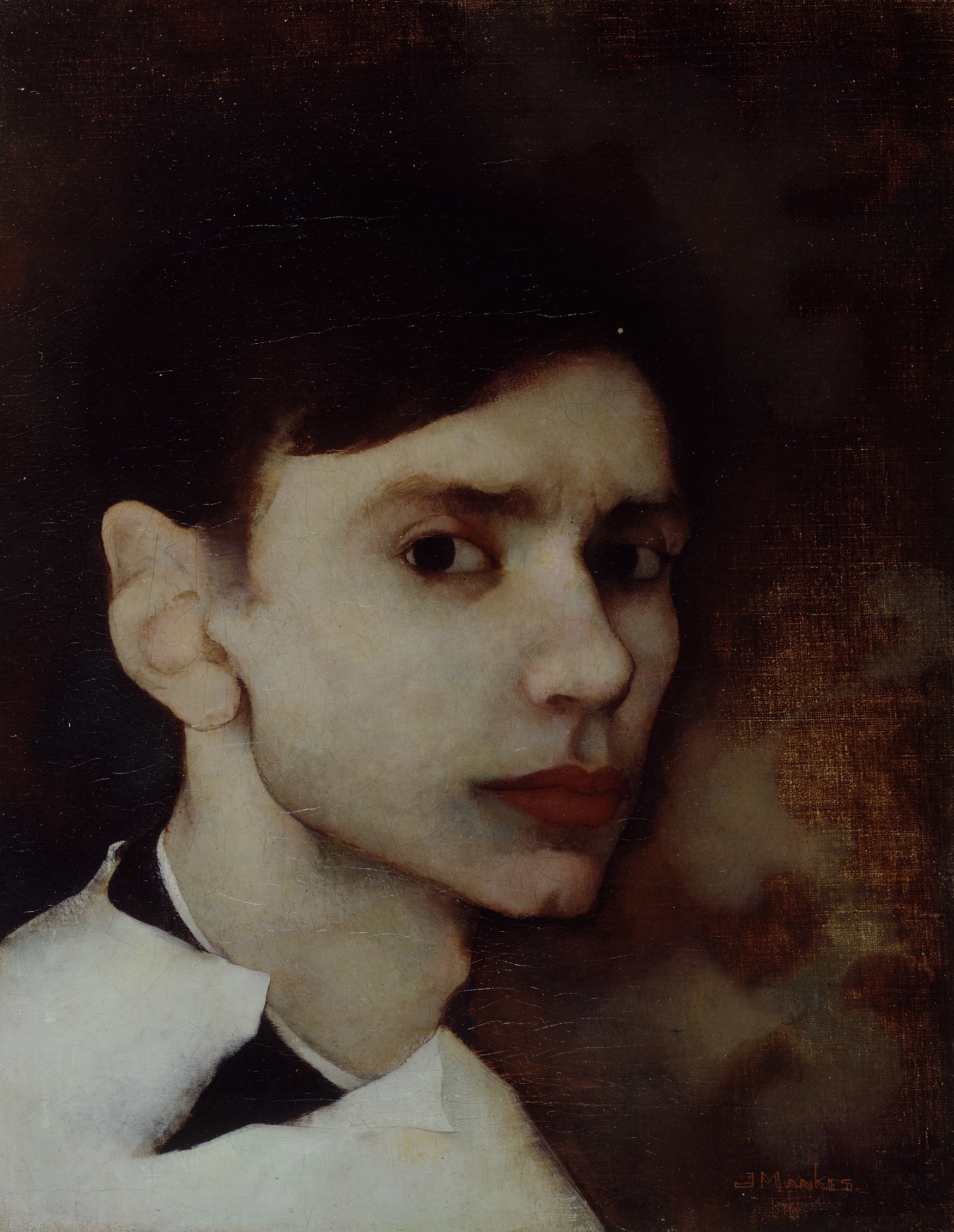
- Self-portrait of Jan Mankes
- Born: 15 August 1889; Meppel, Drenthe, Netherlands
- Died: 23 April 1920 (aged 30); Eerbeek, Netherlands
- Known for: Painting
- Spouse: Anne Zernike

Jan Mankes (15 August 1889 – 23 April 1920) was a Dutch painter. He produced around 200 paintings, 100 drawings and 50 prints before dying of tuberculosis at the age of 30. His restrained, detailed work ranged from self-portraits to landscapes and studies of birds and animals. His work is now exhibited in his native Netherlands in the Museum Arnhem, Museum Belvédère and Museum MORE.

== Biography ==
Mankes had a reputation as an ascetic living in a kind of self-chosen isolation in De Knipe, Friesland, far from the heart of the country's culture. In reality he was well aware of what was going on, read the leading newspapers and magazines, and was supplied by friends with newspaper clippings and other material. In addition, he had lived in The Hague and (because of his tuberculosis) in Eerbeek, in Gelderland, but preferred to keep an "intimate distance". A progressive Protestant, in 1915 he married Anne Zernike, the country's first female minister with a doctoral degree. Zernike was a Mennonite; a drawing of her, made by Mankes in 1911, is in the collection of the Fries Museum in Leeuwarden.

From 1909 onwards he was financially supported by A.A.M. Pauwels (1875–1952), a tobacco merchant and art collector from The Hague. Mankes' letters to Pauwels, in which he often thanks him for money and material sent to him, take up seven hundred pages (including annotations) and were published in 2012 by the Netherlands Institute for Art History; Pauwels' letters are not preserved.

== Style and technique ==
He is sometimes categorized as a symbolic realist, though Carel Peeters notes that the abstract qualities of Mankes's work remove him from both symbolism and realism. When working with oil paints he was able to bring a kind of transparency to the paint especially when he was working with white, which acquired a pearly lustre because of his soft brush strokes. In self-portraits, observers noted, this gave his white skin a rather sickly appearance.

Mankes studied and then sketched his subjects (often birds and farm animals) "until he knew them by heart, and then painted them from memory". One of his favorite animals (he kept it in his room) was an owl, sent to him by his benefactor Pauwels. Mankes used a glazing technique, in which a large number of layers of paint on an opaque base "lend a fairytale-like quality to the owl".

== Gallery ==
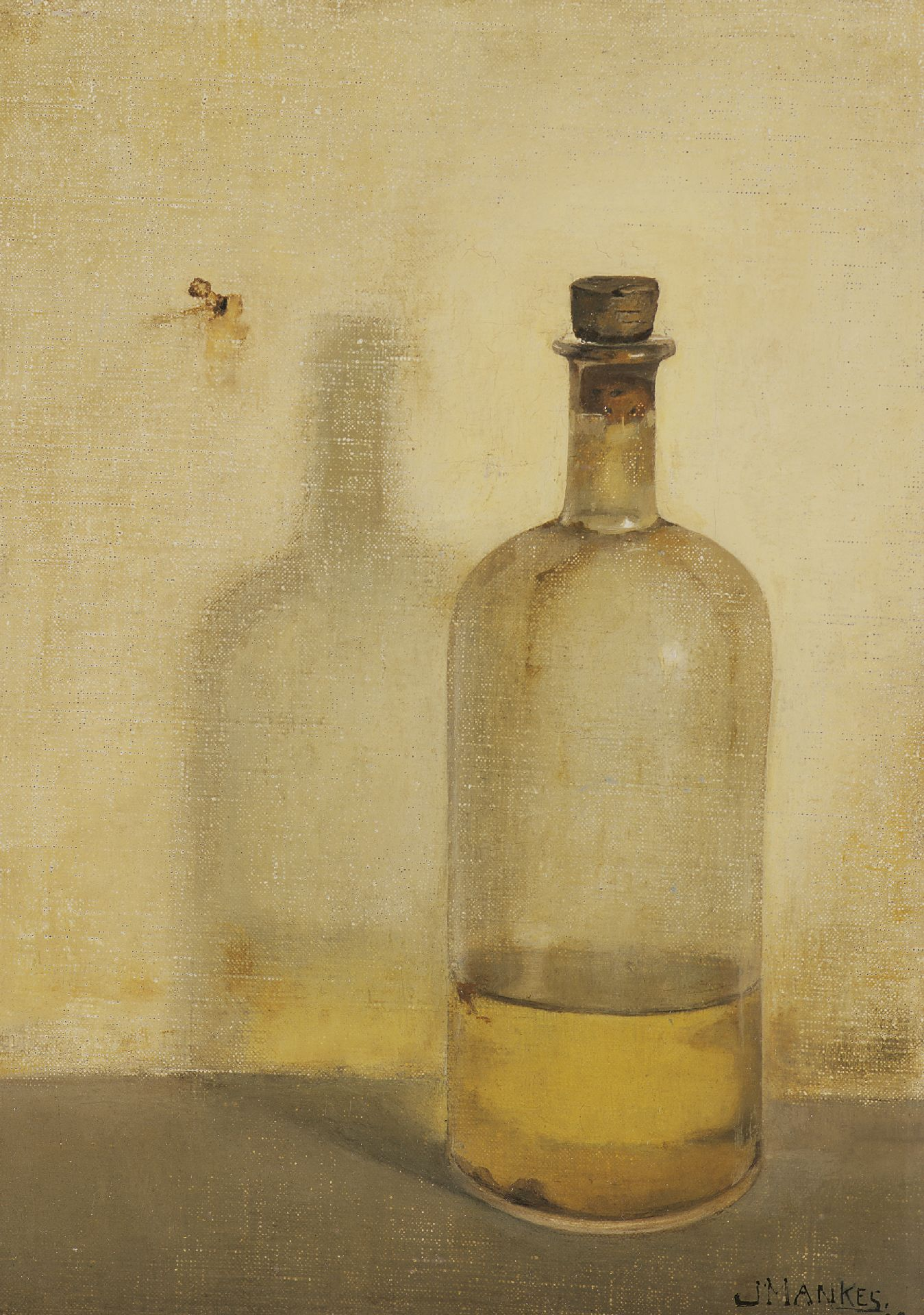
Oil-bottle (1909)

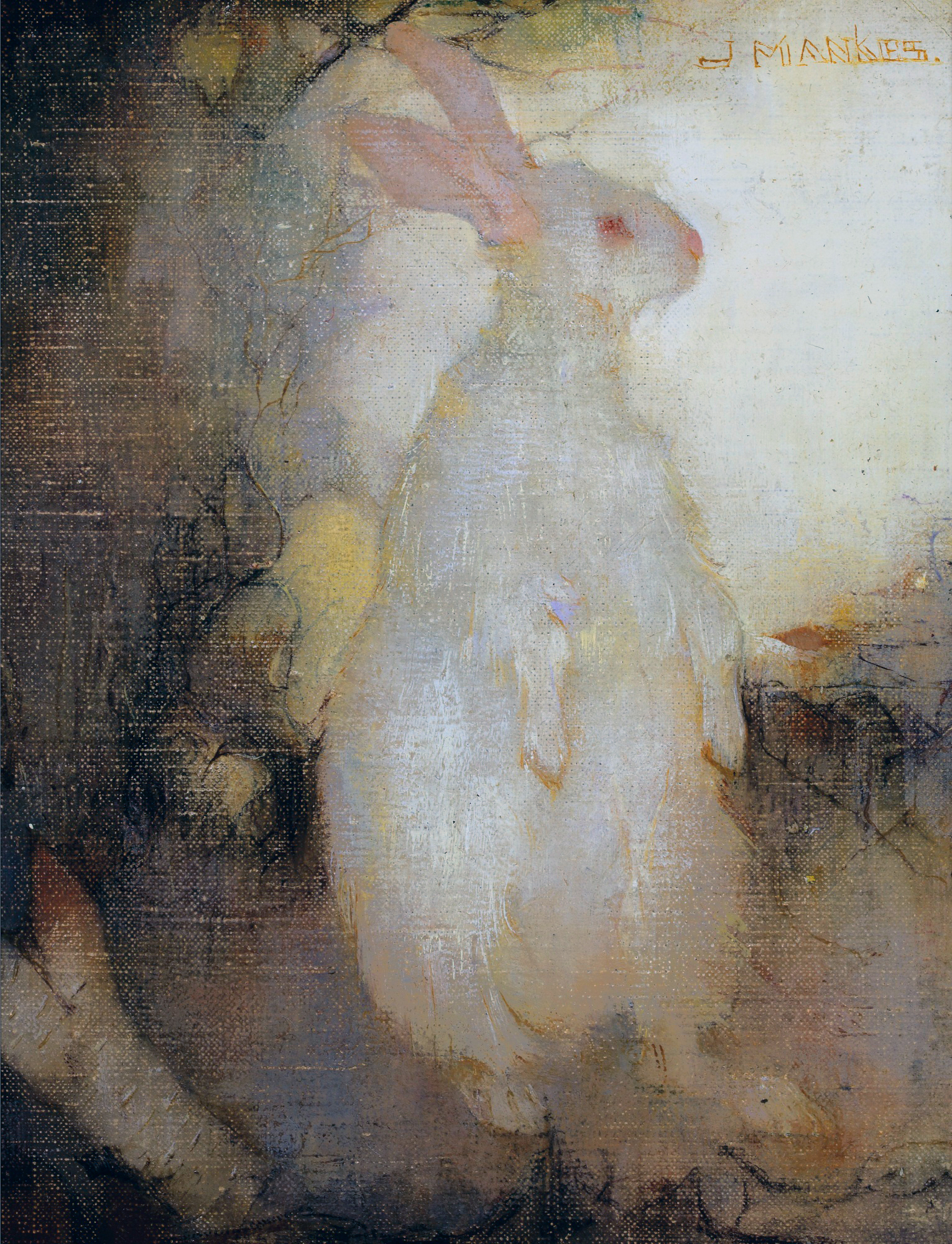
White rabbit (1910)

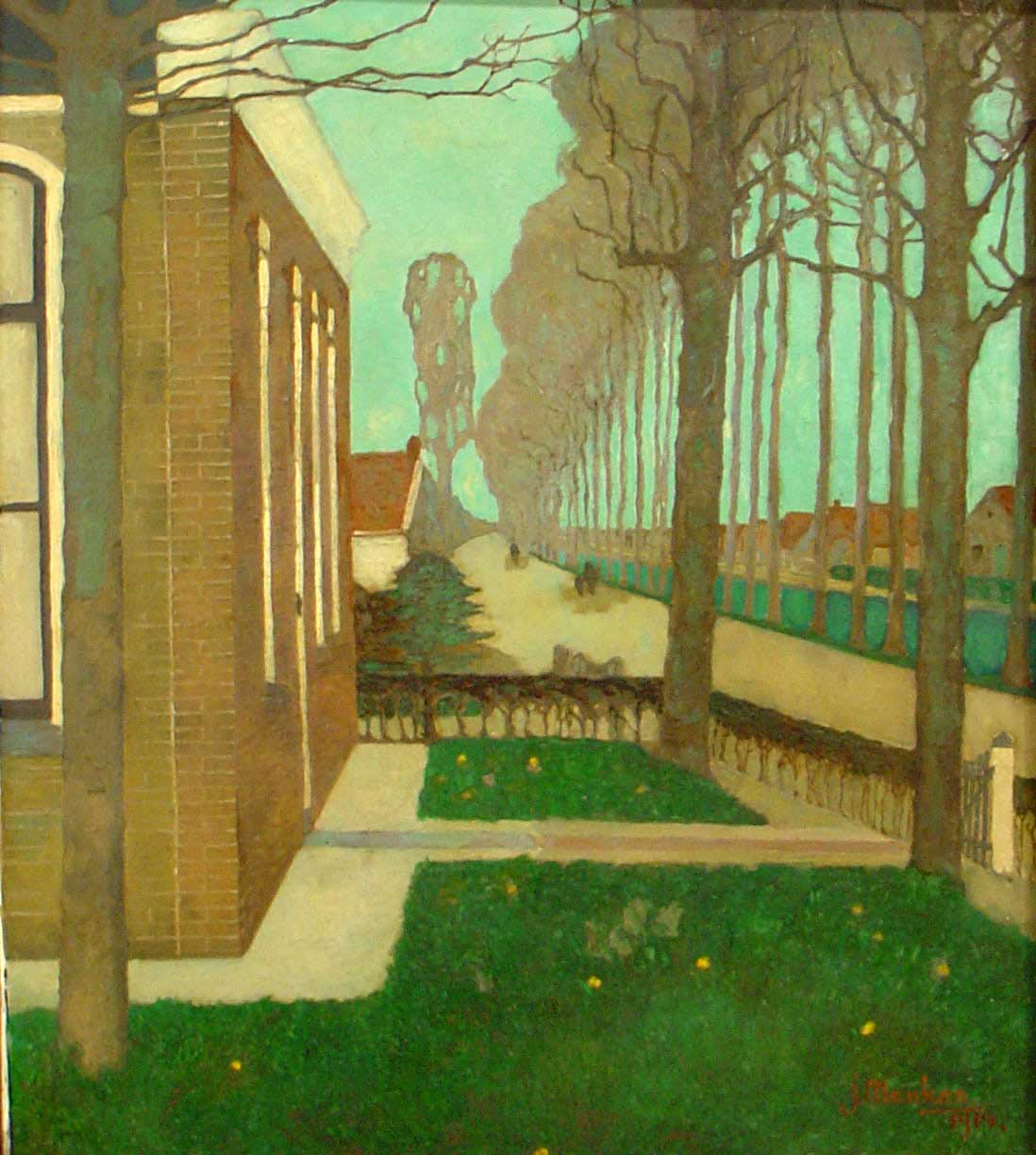
Road alongside the canal in de Knijpe (1914)

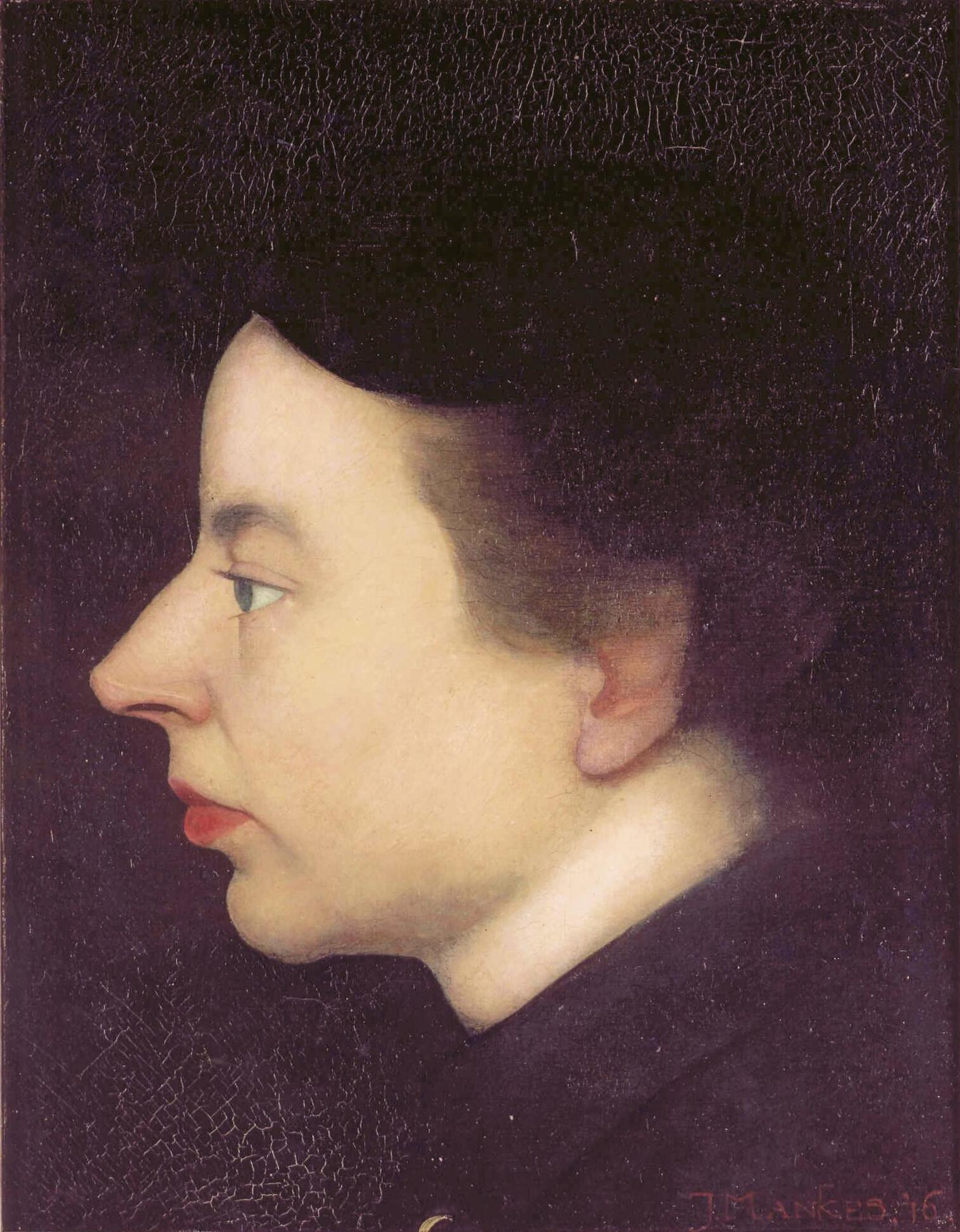
Anne Mankes-Zernike (1916)

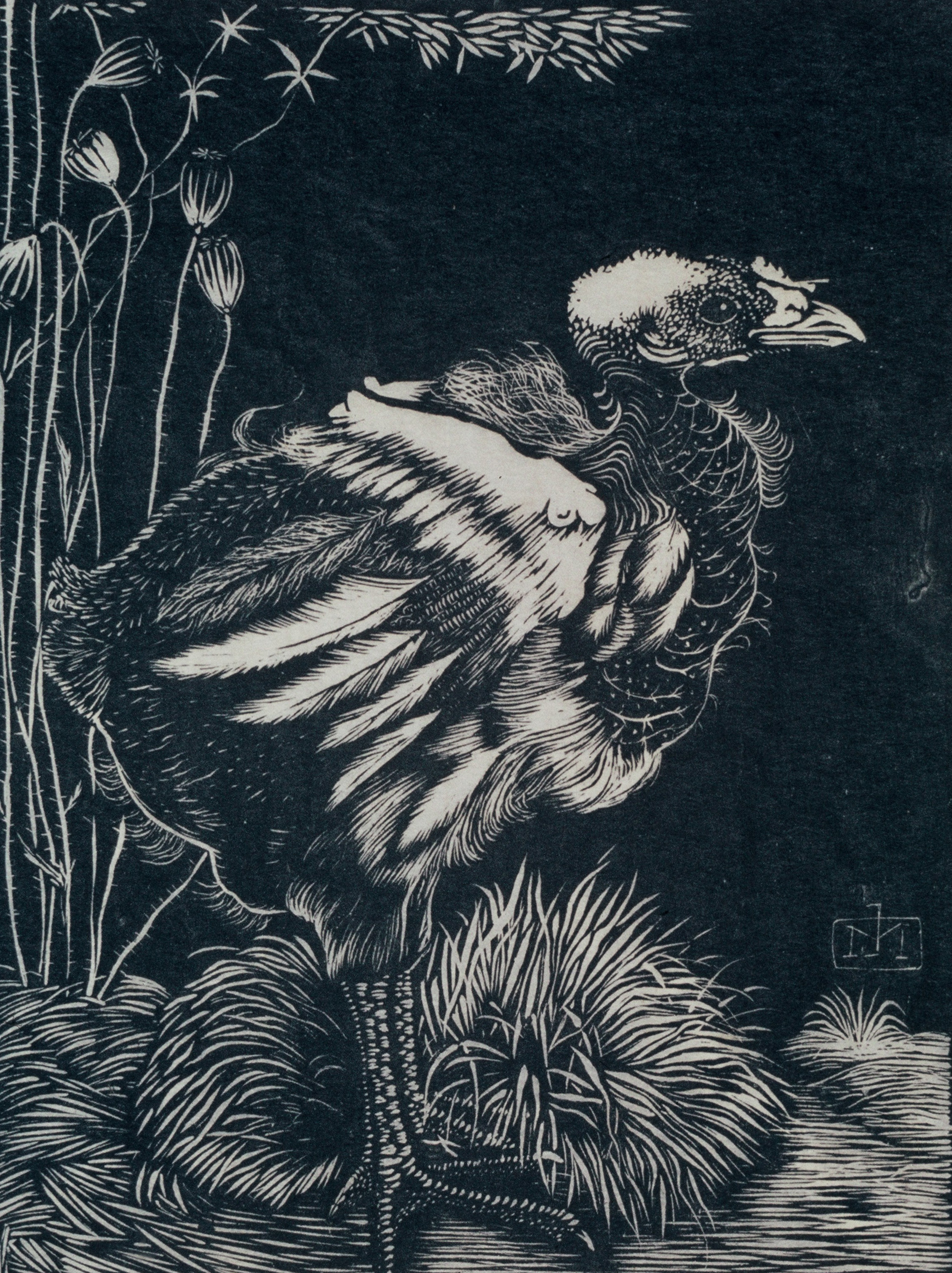
Nestkuiken (1917)

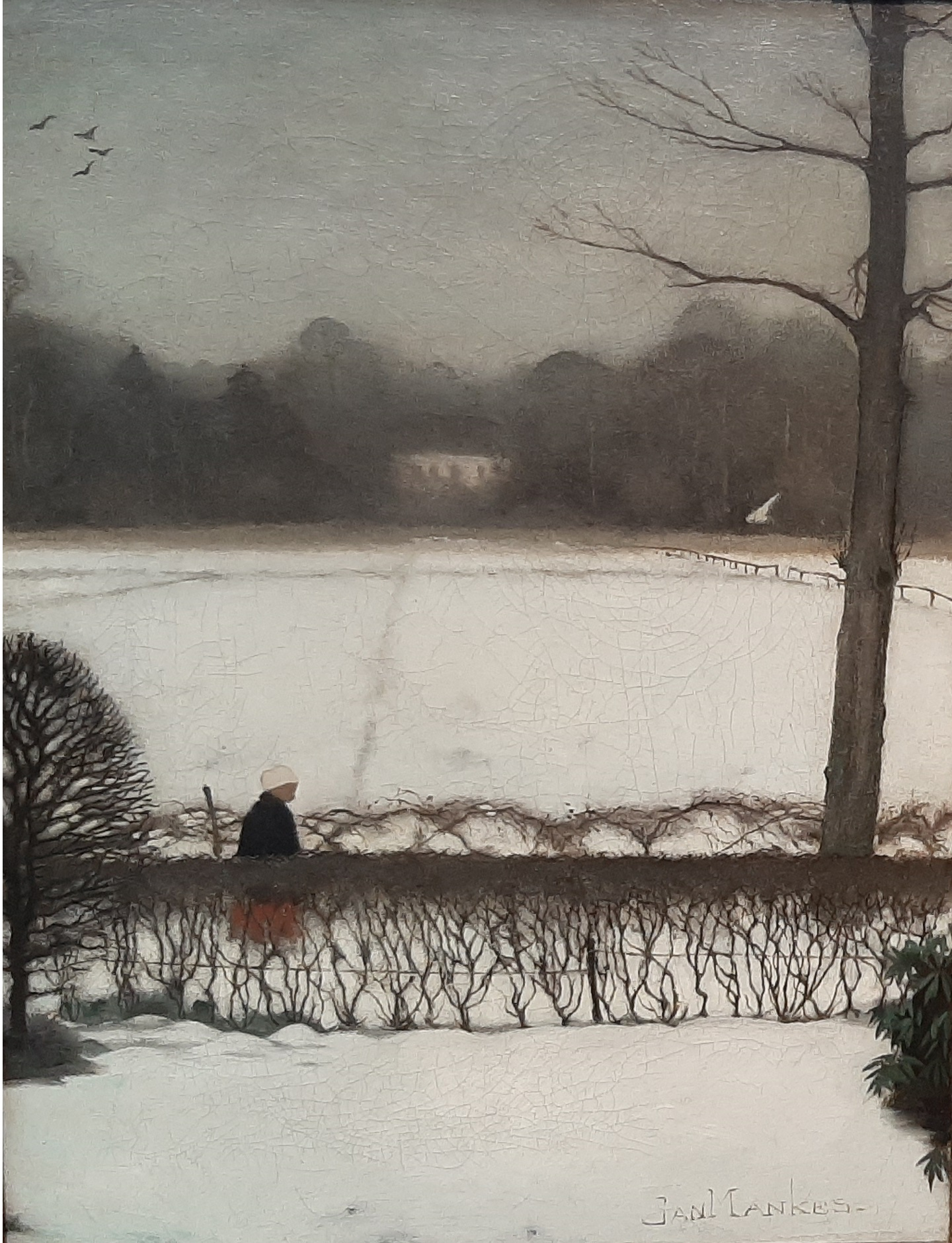
View from the Studio in Eerbeek (1917)

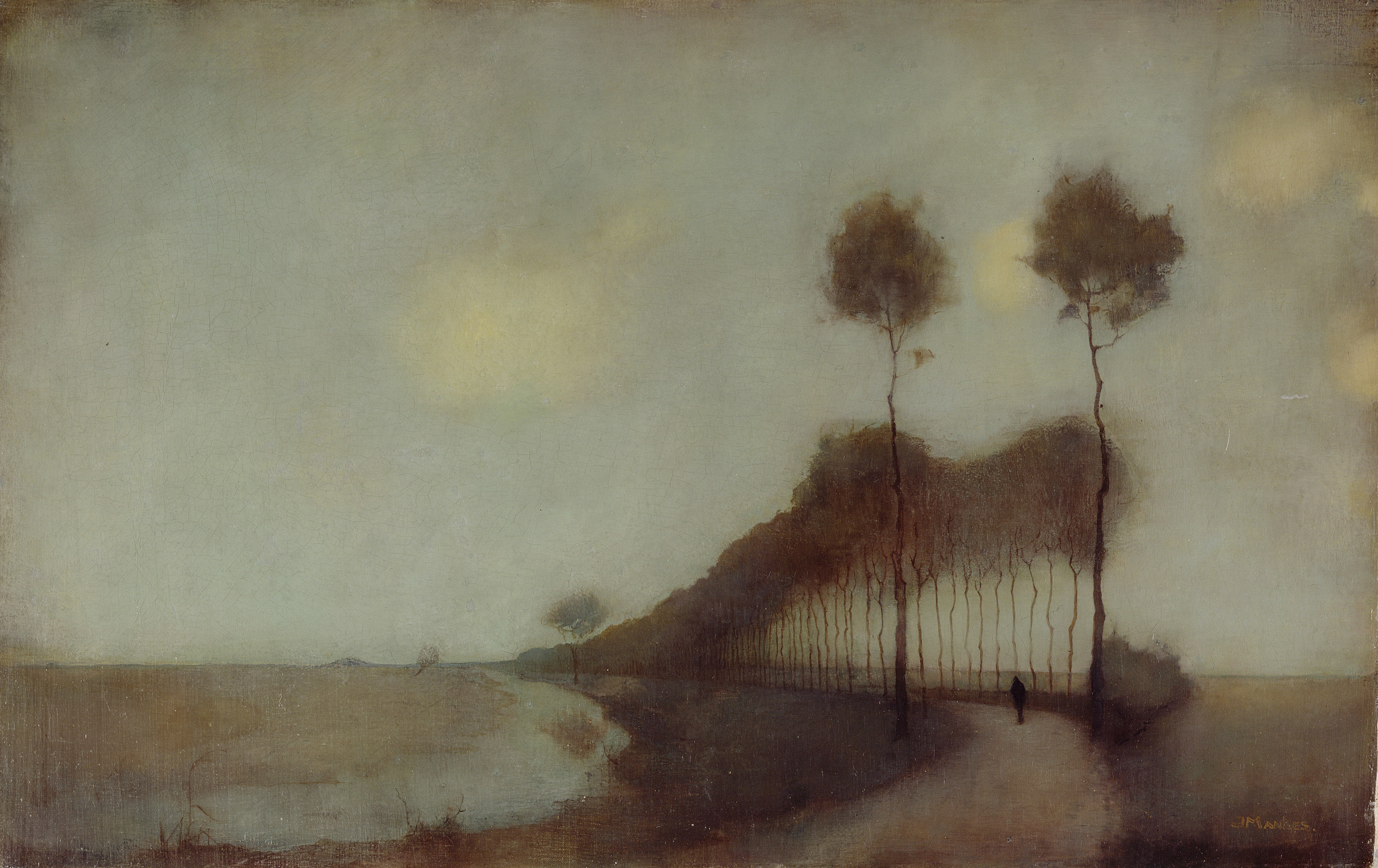
Woudster road near Oranjewoud

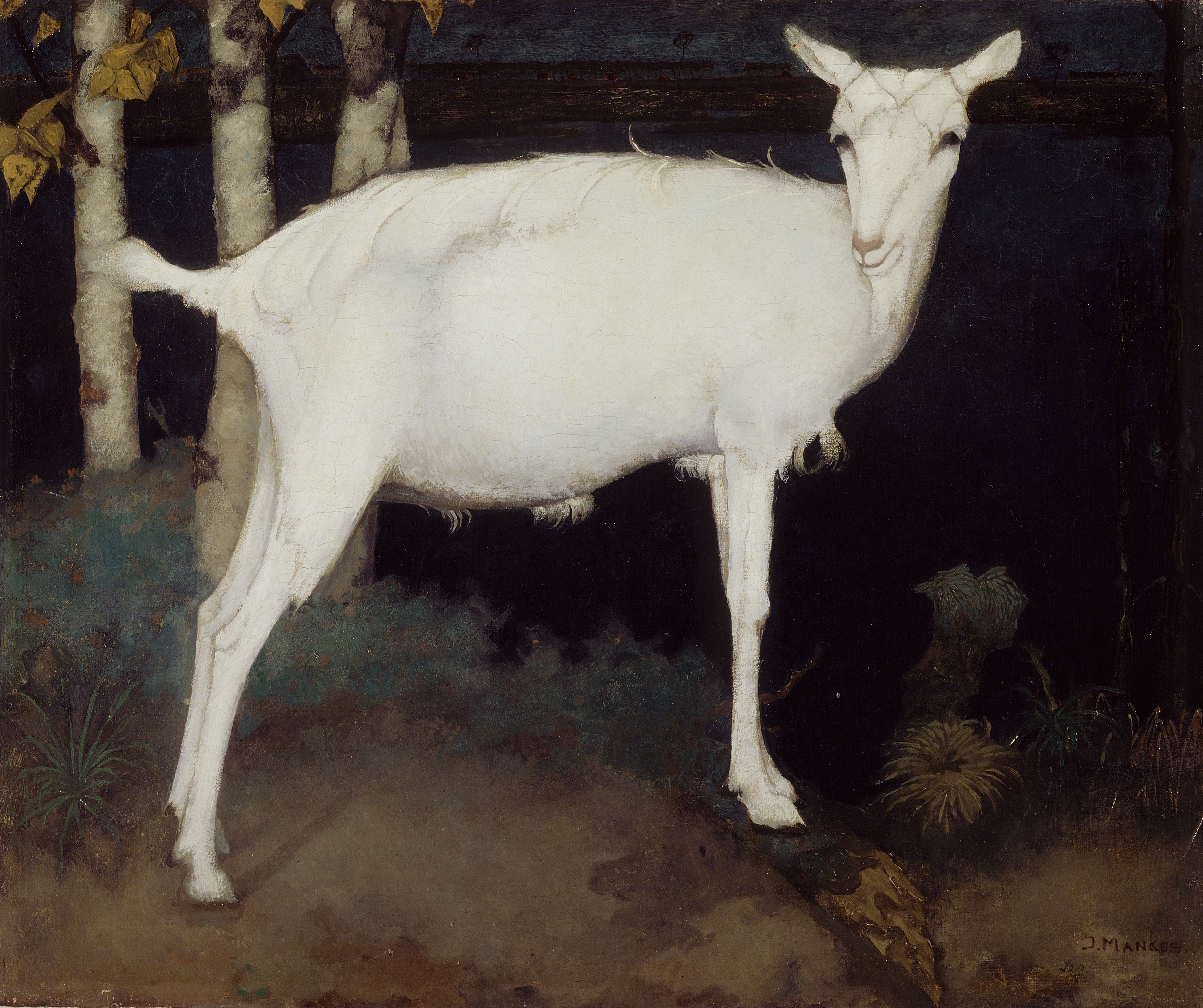
Young white goat
