= Karel Aalbers =

Dutch businessman

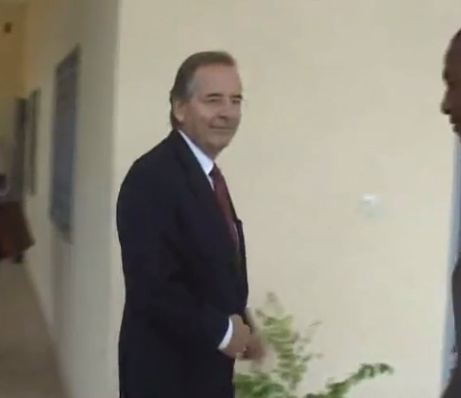
- Born: June 28, 1949; Velp, Gelderland
- Occupation: Football Club President
- Known for: Gelredome idea

Karel Aalbers (born June 28, 1949, Velp) is a Dutch businessman, who was the President of the football club Vitesse Arnhem from 1984 until February 2000.

== Career ==
Aalbers' goal was to bring Vitesse from the bottom of the second tier, where the club was when he started, to the top 40 soccer clubs of Europe.

Aalbers developed the basic idea for the 'Gelredome', a stadium with a sliding pitch that can be moved out of the building. Later, the same system was applied in Gelsenkirchen (Schalke 04) and in Japan. Events such as pop concerts can be held without damaging the grass. Gelredome opened in 1998. It has a roof that can be opened and closed and is fully climate controlled. In the first season after the opening, Vitesse's attendance rose to 20,000, from less than 8,000 in the old stadium.

Aalbers financed the ambitions by making solid profits on the transfer market. Players such as Roy Makaay, Sander Westerveld, Nikos Machlas, Glenn Helder and Philip Cocu were sold for large sums of money. Others came to occupy empty player positions, such as Mahamadou Diarra and Pierre van Hooijdonk.

Vitesse ranked in the top 4 positions, made a profit and showed a solid balance sheet in the final years of his presidency.

Aalbers resigned on 15 February 2000, after the main sponsor, Nuon, threatened to pull the plug if he did not. Nuon, a public utility company owned by local authorities, had trouble explaining why it invested heavily in Aalbers' ambitious plans.

The successor was Jan Koning, the former chief of Sara Lee's Douwe Egberts. In a short period of time, Vitesse began to show negative financial results, due to poor deals on the transfer market. The club survived numerous financial crises, such as the last one in 2008, when debts were bought of, under the threat of bankruptcy.

Aalbers is currently a marketing expert and consultant in city and stadium development. He acts as a matchmaker in international projects. Aalbers and his wife live in Eerbeek.
