= Jacob Emil van Hoogstraten =

Dutch colonial public servant (1898–1991)

Dick van Hoogstraten
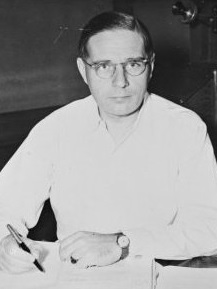
- Hoogstraten in 1947
- Born: 26 March 1898; Eerbeek, Netherlands
- Died: 17 March 1991 (aged 92); The Hague, Netherlands
- Other name: Jacob Emil van Hoogstraten
- Education: Utrecht University
- Occupation: Public servant
- Years active: 1922–1964

Jacob Emil "Dick" van Hoogstraten (26 March 1898 – 17 March 1991) was a Dutch public servant in the Dutch East Indies from 1922 to 1949, serving as Director of the Department of Economic Affairs from 1942 to 1949. He was involved in economic policy during the recovery from the economic crisis of the early 1930s and in postwar reconstruction following the Japanese occupation.

== Early life and education ==
Van Hoogstraten was born in Eerbeek on 26 March 1898. The ancestry of the Van Hoogstraten family reaches back to the 16th century. His father, Gerard van Hoogstraten (1870–1920), was a minister in the Dutch Reformed Church in Eerbeek. His mother, Amanda Augusta Schoch (1869–1951), was an editor and author of women's novels and other publications of a Christian-philosophical nature. Van Hoogstraten attended primary school and secondary school in nearby Apeldoorn.

He graduated from his undergraduate law studies at Utrecht University in 1920. Later that year, he received a doctorate in law after defending propositions at the same university. After completing his military service, he was appointed to a position in the public service in colonial Indonesia in July 1922. Before his departure for Indonesia, he married Johanna Wilhelmina ("Angy") Sanders (1900–1958) on 19 September 1922 in Lausanne, Switzerland.

== Colonial public service in the 1920s ==
Late in 1922, Van Hoogstraten began working at the General Secretariat in Buitenzorg (now Bogor), in the service of the Governor-General. In Buitenzorg, Van Hoogstraten and his wife had four children: Gheret Samuel (1923–2008), Susanne Marianne (born 1924), Jean Gustave Ulric (1927–1990), and Dirk Hans (1933–2002).

He also served on the Regency Council of Buitenzorg, advising the indigenous regents (bupati), from 1925 to 1928 and again from 1933 to 1935. He briefly worked at the Department of Education and Religion during the first half of 1927. As was usual in colonial Indonesia, after six years of public service Van Hoogstraten was granted eight months of furlough in 1928. The family left in November 1928 and spent an extended leave period in Lausanne, returning to Indonesia in March 1930.

Upon his return in April 1930, Van Hoogstraten rejoined the General Secretariat. He was soon appointed secretary of a committee established to investigate news agency Aneta and later became head of the section for government publications. The committee substantiated allegations expressed in parliament concerning a lack of objectivity in Aneta's press releases and the agency's misuse of its near-monopoly on access to news in colonial Indonesia. Van Hoogstraten was appointed a Knight of the Order of the Netherlands Lion in August 1931. He also became secretary of the Council of Department Directors in December 1931.

== Religious and civic activities ==
Van Hoogstraten was active in organisations associated with the Dutch Reformed Church and Christian politics. From 1926 to 1928, he was secretary of the private Committee for the Separation of Church and State (Commissie voor de Scheiding van Kerk en Staat). In the 1930s, he was an elder in the Dutch Reformed Church in Bogor and chaired the Bogor chapter of the Christian Constitutional Party (Christelijke Staatkundige Partij, CSP). As a church elder, he participated in a proto-synod in April 1933, which established the foundations for the reorganisation of the Dutch Reformed Church in Indonesia.

He also participated as a speaker at religion-related events organised by groups including the Salvation Army and the CSP, gave public speeches on topics such as the separation of church and state, became a member of the governing board of the Dutch Reformed Church, and served on the inaugural board of the theological high school in Bogor for the training of missionaries.

== Economic crisis and recovery, 1933–1941 ==
In addition to serving as secretary of the Council of Department Directors, Van Hoogstraten became secretary of the council's subcommittee for economic issues in August 1933. In May 1934, he joined the newly established Department of Economic Affairs, headed by Edmund P. Wellenstein, as head of the section for foreign trade policy. He was immediately attached to the Dutch delegation to the Hart–Nagaoka bilateral trade negotiations with Japan, held in Bogor between September and December 1934. From April 1935, Van Hoogstraten also served as head of the section for economic crisis measures.

From May 1934, his professional duties increased considerably, while his religion-related social activities decreased. Colonial Indonesia had been severely affected by the global economic crisis. Import restrictions imposed by trading partners created significant surpluses of sugar, rubber, tea and other commodities, while rising imports of Japanese textiles displaced imports from the Netherlands and local production. The Department of Economic Affairs used government intervention to address the crisis through licensing of production capacity and an intricate system of import quotas intended to limit imports and protect domestic production of manufactured goods and staple foods, particularly rice.

Indonesia's import restrictions became increasingly detailed and were also the subject of regular negotiations with the Netherlands and with existing and potential trading partners, including India and Thailand in March 1936, Japan and China in May 1937, and Australia in November 1941. Van Hoogstraten participated in or led delegations to these countries to discuss trade opportunities, bilateral trade concessions and shipping connections. Domestic import controls also required consultations with local importers, including rice importers in Medan following the government's ban on rice imports in May 1937. Import concessions granted by trading partners for particular agricultural commodities required controls over exports, production and prices through cooperation with newly established semi-private associations of producers and exporters.

After a further six years of public service, Van Hoogstraten was granted furlough from April to October 1936. His wife had returned to the Netherlands with their two youngest children in October 1935.

Upon his return to Indonesia, Van Hoogstraten was one of the senior officials in the Department of Economic Affairs. When Hubertus J. van Mook became Director in 1937, the two worked closely on shaping and implementing Indonesia's trade policies, and Van Hoogstraten became Van Mook's deputy.

Together, Van Mook and Van Hoogstraten led further trade negotiations with Japanese representatives in 1938 and 1940–1941. Van Hoogstraten also negotiated the principles and details of Dutch-Indonesian economic cooperation with the Dutch government during 1939–1940, balancing the foreign-trade interests of the Netherlands with those of colonial Indonesia, including Indonesia's foreign-currency earnings.

== Japanese occupation, 1942–1945 ==
When the Dutch government appointed Van Mook as Lieutenant Governor-General in January 1942, Van Hoogstraten became Director of Economic Affairs. Together with Van Mook, he flew to Australia on 7 March 1942, shortly before the fall of Java to the Japanese.

A month later, Van Mook was called to London to become Minister of Colonial Affairs in the Dutch government in exile in addition to serving as Lieutenant Governor-General. Van Hoogstraten was left in charge of organising the Netherlands East Indies Commission for Australia and New Zealand, based in Melbourne. The commission functioned as part of the Netherlands Indies government in exile and worked with the Australian government to prepare for the return to Indonesia after the war.

As minister, Van Mook abolished the commission in July 1944 and created several government departments. Van Hoogstraten was appointed Director of Economic Affairs and acting General Secretary of the Council of Department Heads (Raad van Departementshoofden), which functioned as the colonial government in exile. It worked with the US Allied Supreme Commander of the South West Pacific Area, General Douglas MacArthur, and began establishing the Netherlands Indies Civil Administration (Nederlandsch-Indische Civiele Administratie, NICA), a public service intended to assume civil administration in Indonesia after the war.

Following Van Mook's return to Australia in September 1944, the colonial government in exile moved to Brisbane, where it prepared for the restoration of civil administration in Indonesia after the Japanese surrender, as well as for relief and recovery operations.

== Decolonisation, 1945–1949 ==
At the time of Japan's surrender, Van Hoogstraten was in the Netherlands, which had been liberated a few months earlier. He left on 17 August to return to Indonesia. Back in Jakarta in September, with NICA support, he resumed his duties as Director of Economic Affairs and oversaw the recovery of the department's facilities and the preparation of policies for Indonesia's postwar economic recovery.

One of the department's first measures was to take control of foreign trade through the Netherlands Indies Common Import and Export Organisation (Nederlandsch-Indische Gemeenschappijke Import en Export Organisatie), which had been established in Melbourne in 1944 to license foreign trade and enable the colonial government to allocate foreign-exchange earnings to essential imports.

Van Hoogstraten subsequently became involved in negotiations over Indonesia's independence as a federal republic, which contributed to the completion of the Linggadjati Agreement in November 1946. During negotiations and planning for economic recovery, he had regular contact with his counterpart in the government of the Republic of Indonesia, Adnan Kapau ("A.K.") Gani, particularly in April and May 1947. Van Hoogstraten negotiated further details with Gani following the ratification of the Linggadjati Agreement in March 1947. His duties also included representing Indonesia's economic interests in the United States and the Netherlands.

Following the creation of the Provisional Federal Council of Indonesia in January 1948, the Council of Department Heads became the Provisional Federal Government of Indonesia in March 1948, in which Van Hoogstraten served as State Secretary for Economic Affairs. He then focused on foreign-exchange shortages and planning for Indonesia's economic future, including the revival of industrialisation plans prepared by the Department of Economic Affairs in 1941.

A year later, Van Hoogstraten was a member of the delegation of the provisional government that negotiated Indonesia's independence with the Republic of Indonesia during the Round Table Conference in September and October 1949. His contribution focused on discussions in the economic and financial committee, particularly bilateral financial transfers between Indonesia and the Netherlands.

== Personal life ==
Van Hoogstraten and his first wife divorced on 25 March 1947 in The Hague. On 26 April 1947, during a visit to Australia, he married Lucy Bell Donaldson (1907–1987) in Melbourne. She was the daughter of Major Robert J. Donaldson, DSO, Vice-Consul of the Netherlands in Queensland, and worked for the Netherlands Indies government in Melbourne.

== Later career ==
Following the transfer of sovereignty over Indonesia in December 1949, Van Hoogstraten left colonial public service. From 1950 until his retirement in late 1958 at the age of 60, he was employed by the Foundation for the Representation in Indonesia of the Netherlands Manufacturing Industry (Stichting Vertegenwoordiging in Indonesië van de Nederlandse Industrie). Based in Jakarta, he travelled throughout the region as the foundation's general representative for the Far East, Australia and New Zealand.

After his retirement, Van Hoogstraten returned to the Netherlands and settled in The Hague, where he lived until his death on 17 March 1991.

== Honours ==
Van Hoogstraten was appointed a Knight of the Order of the Netherlands Lion by the Dutch government in 1931 and an Officer of the Order of Orange-Nassau in 1938. The French government appointed him an Officer of the Order of the Black Star in 1933, while the Chinese government awarded him the Order of Brilliant Jade in 1938 and appointed him Commander of the Order of Brilliant Jade the following year.
