= Eerbeek =

- Town
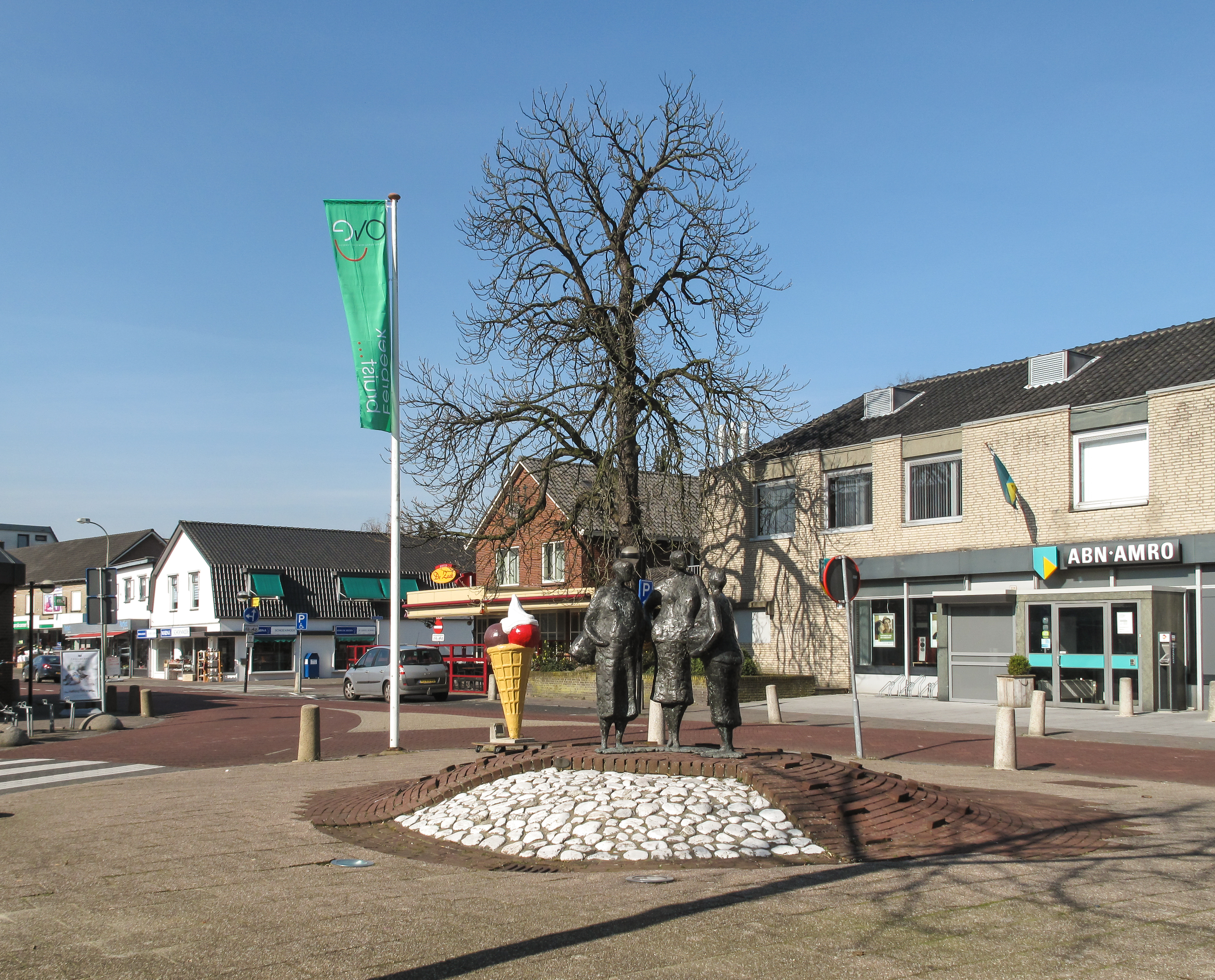
- Eerbeek, street view: de Stuijvenburchstraat

- Location in the province of Gelderland in the Netherlands Eerbeek (Netherlands)
- Coordinates: 52°06′19″N 6°03′48″E
- Country: Netherlands
- Province: Gelderland
- Municipality: Brummen

Area
  - Total: 17.08 km^{2} (6.59 sq mi)
- Elevation: 20 m (66 ft)

Population (2021)
  - Total: 9,845
  - Density: 576.4/km^{2} (1,493/sq mi)
- Time zone: UTC+1 (CET)
  - Summer (DST): UTC+2 (CEST)
- Postal code: 6961
- Dialing code: 0313

Eerbeek is a town in the municipality of Brummen in the province of Gelderland in the Netherlands. Eerbeek was first mentioned in 1046 as Erbeke. In the 18th century, Eerbeek became a centre of paper production. Due to its proximity to the Veluwezoom National Park, Eerbeek is popular with tourists.

== History ==
The village was first mentioned in 1046 as Erbeke. It is named after a stream, however the etymology is unclear. Eerbeek developed near the spring of the Eerdbeek. In the 18th century it became a centre of paper production.

Coldenhove Castle (Dutch: Kasteel Coldenhove) was a castle used as hunting lodge by the dukes of Guelders and the princes of Orange. Nothing remains anymore of the castle.

Huis te Eerbeek is a havezate (manor house) from the 14th century. It was rebuilt in neoclassic style in 1872, however one wing of its medieval predecessor has remained. It is surrounded by a large park, and is nowadays used as hotel and a conference centre.

The water mill Oliemolen was built around and used to function both as an oil mill and a grist mill. A water mill was first referenced at the site in 1395. It remained in service until 1917. In 1967, the building was restored, however the grist mill part was modified into a restaurant.

The Dutch Reformed church dates from 1930 and is a replacement of its 1857 predecessor. The tower which was built between 1858 and 1859 has remained and is detached from the church.

Eerbeek was home to 747 people in 1840. In 1887, a railway station was built on the Dieren to Apeldoorn railway line. It remained in service until 1950. In 1975, it reopened as part of a museum line operated by the Veluwsche Stoomtrein Maatschappij.

== People from Eerbeek ==
- Jacob Emil van Hoogstraten, Director of the Department of Economic Affairs in colonial Indonesia
- Karel Aalbers, former chairman of football club Vitesse Arnhem
- Daan Huiskamp, football player
- Jan Mankes, painter
- Willem de Mérode, poet
- Edward Sturing, football player and coach
- Max Carl Wilhelm Weber, zoologist
- Robert de Haan, racing driver

== Gallery ==
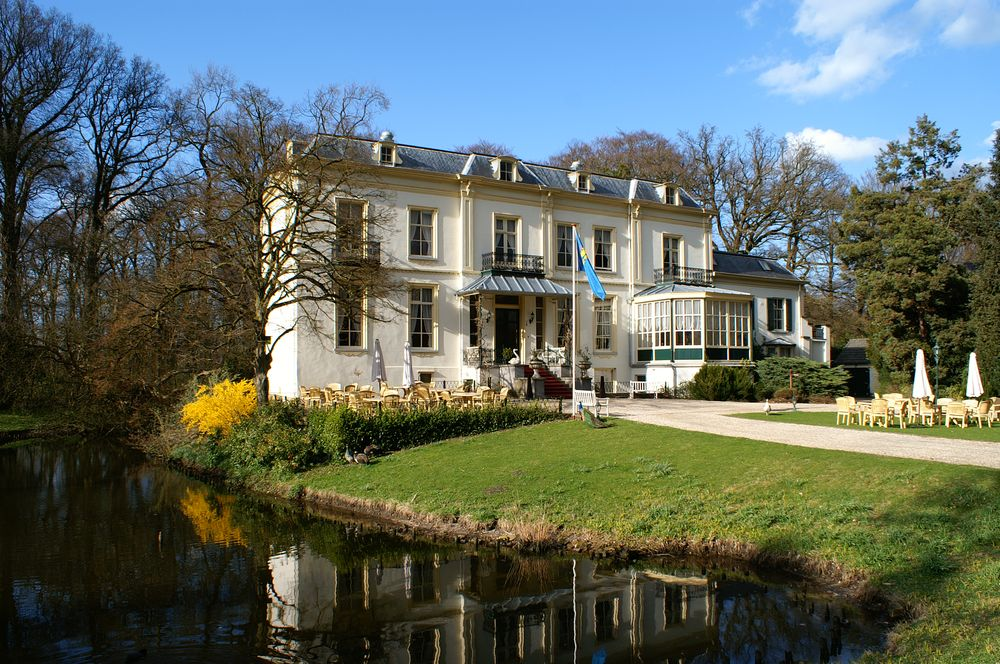
Huis te Eerbeek

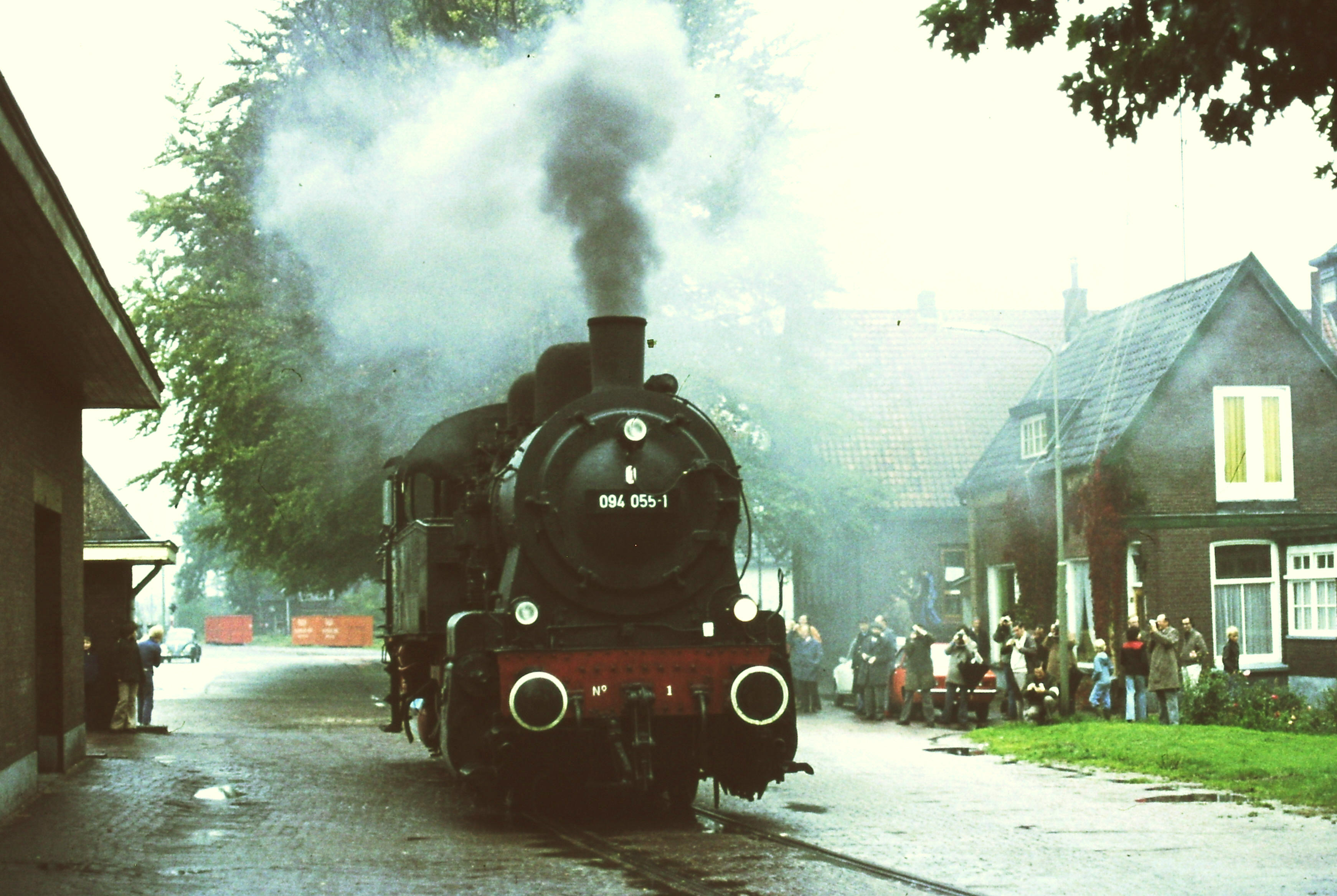
Train arriving in Eerbeek (1975)

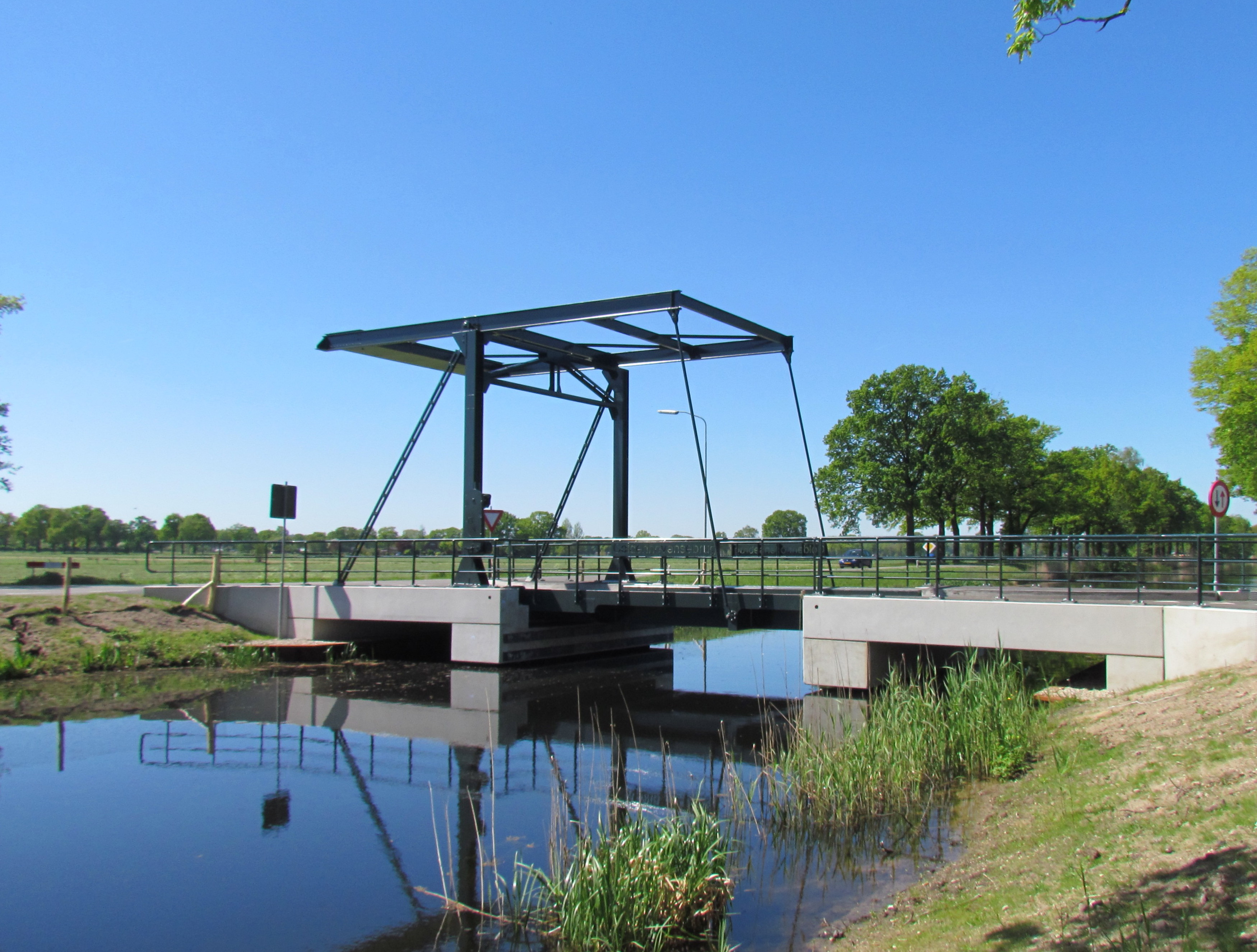
Draw bridge

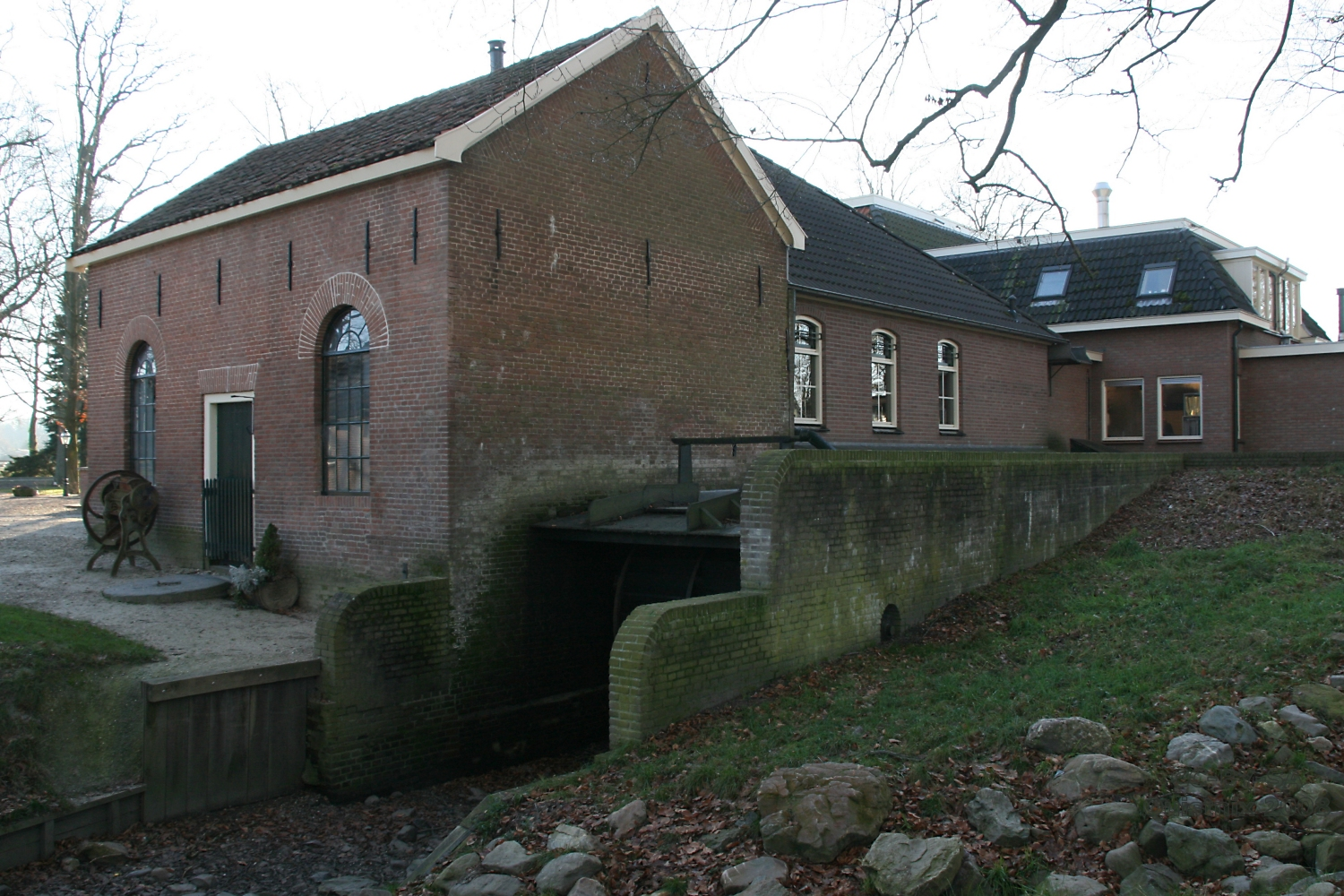
The water mill of Eerbeek
