= Beilstein =

Beilstein may refer to:

== Places in Germany ==
- Beilstein, Hesse, a village
- Beilstein, Rhineland-Palatinate, a municipality
- Beilstein, Württemberg, a town
- Beilstein (Rhön), an extinct volcano in Hesse
- Beilstein (Spessart), a hill in the Main-Kinzig district of Hesse

== Other uses ==
- Beilstein, a peak in the Hochschwab Mountains, Austria
- Anke Beilstein (born 1966), German politician
- Friedrich Konrad Beilstein (1838–1906), Russian chemist
  - Beilstein database, in organic chemistry
  - Beilstein Institute for the Advancement of Chemical Sciences
  - Beilstein Journal of Nanotechnology
  - Beilstein Journal of Organic Chemistry
  - Beilstein Registry Number
  - Beilstein test, a qualitative test for halides

== See also ==
- Counts of Nassau-Beilstein, in the House of Nassau
- Lordship of Winneburg and Beilstein, a territory of the Holy Roman Empire
