= Center for the Transformation of Chemistry =

Large-scale research center in Germany

Center for the Transformation of Chemistry (CTC)
- Established: 2023; 3 years ago (Start-up Phase)
- Location: Delitzsch, Saxony, Germany
- Other campuses: Merseburg, Saxony-Anhalt
- Temporary location: Leuna, Saxony-Anhalt
- Website: Official Webpage

The Center for the Transformation of Chemistry (CTC) is an emerging large-scale research center with locations in Delitzsch, Saxony, and Merseburg, Saxony-Anhalt, Germany. Its mission is to drive the transformation of chemistry to support a circular economy. The establishment of the CTC began in 2023, and by 2038, the center is expected to employ a total of 1,000 staff members. The designated founding director is chemist Peter Seeberger.

== Background ==
In August 2020, the Coal Regions Structural Strengthening Act (StStG) was enacted as a structural support measure for regions affected by the phase-out of coal. To create new opportunities for these regions, § 17, item 29 of the StStG mandates the "establishment of one new institutionally funded large-scale research center under Helmholtz or comparable conditions in Saxon Lusatia and the Central German Lignite Mining District through a competitive process."

This competition was conducted by the German Federal Ministry of Education and Research (BMBF) under the initiative "Knowledge Creates Perspectives for the Region!" In September 2022, the concept from Peter Seeberger and Matthew Plutschack for the CTC was selected as the winning proposal for the Central German site.

== Funding ==
Until the CTC is formally established as an independent institution, the Max Planck Institute of Colloids and Interfaces in Potsdam is coordinating its development through project funding from the Federal Ministry of Education and Research (Germany).

For the CTC's establishment, the German federal government, the Free State of Saxony, and the state of Saxony-Anhalt are collectively providing €1.2 billion in funding. Of this amount, the federal government contributes 90%, the Free State of Saxony 7%, and Saxony-Anhalt 3%. From 2038 onwards, the center's annual budget is expected to be €170 million.

== Locations ==
A CTC campus with 700 employees is planned for the site of the former Delitzsch Sugar Factory.

A second site, accommodating 300 employees, will be located adjacent to Merseburg University of Applied Sciences.

The CTC continues the industrial heritage of the Central German Chemical Triangle. During the initial phase, the growing CTC team is working from temporary offices in the Nordsachsen district administration building in Delitzsch and in the main building of the Leuna works in Leuna.
