= Zehlendorf =

Zehlendorf can refer to:

- Zehlendorf (Berlin), a district in Berlin, Germany
- Zehlendorf bei Oranienburg, a small village north of Berlin, part of Oranienburg
- Sender Zehlendorf, a radio transmission site
