= Anna Fischer (scientist) =

German chemist (born 1981)

- Born: Mainz
- Education: Max Planck Institute of Colloids and Interfaces; École normale supérieure Pierre and Marie Curie University; Lycée Buffon; Lycée Henri-IV
- Scientific career
- Workplaces: Max Planck Institute of Colloids and Interfaces; University of Freiburg; Technische Universität Berlin
- Thesis: Reactive hard templating from carbon nitrides to metal nitrides (2008)

Anna Fischer (born 1981) is a German chemist who is a Professor of Nanomaterials at the University of Freiburg. Her research considers the development of nanomaterials for electrocatalysis.

== Early life and education ==
Fischer was born in Mainz and attended high school at the Lycée Buffon and Lycée Henri-IV. She moved to the Pierre and Marie Curie University for her undergraduate studies, where she specialised in physics and chemistry. She completed her graduate degree at the École normale supérieure, where she studied molecular materials. Her thesis considered the development of mesoporous materials (SnO_{2} and TiO_{2}) using evaporation induced self assembly. She moved to the Max Planck Institute of Colloids and Interfaces for her doctoral research, where she created nanostructured metal nitrides through hard templating. She stayed at the Max Planck Institute of Colloids and Interfaces as a postdoctoral researcher, where she developed biominerals.

== Research and career ==
In 2009, Fischer was appointed as a group leader at Technische Universität Berlin. She was promoted to Professor of Inorganic Functional Materials at the University of Freiburg in 2014. She was elected Vice Chair of the German Chemical Society Chemistry and Energy Division in 2022.

In 2023, Fischer showcased redox polymer electrode materials for aluminium ion batteries. The polymer was based on phenothiazine, and achieved a record-breaking storage capacity.

== Selected publications ==
- Arne Thomas; Anna Fischer; Frederic Goettmann; Markus Antonietti; Jens-Oliver Müller; Robert Schlögl; Johan M. Carlsson (2008). "Graphitic carbon nitride materials: variation of structure and morphology and their use as metal-free catalysts". Journal of Materials Chemistry. 18 (41): 4893. doi:10.1039/b800274f. ISSN 0959-9428. S2CID 53124927. Wikidata Q63413867.
- Frederic Goettmann; Anna Fischer; Markus Antonietti; Arne Thomas (1 July 2006). "Chemical synthesis of mesoporous carbon nitrides using hard templates and their use as a metal-free catalyst for Friedel-Crafts reaction of benzene". Angewandte Chemie International Edition. 45 (27): 4467–4471. doi:10.1002/anie.200600412. ISSN 1433-7851. PMID 16770823. Wikidata Q63413872.
- Ivelina Zaharieva; Petko Chernev; Marcel Risch; Katharina Klingan; Mike Kohlhoff; Anna Fischer; Holger Dau (2012). "Electrosynthesis, functional, and structural characterization of a water-oxidizing manganese oxide". Energy & Environmental Science. 5 (5): 7081. doi:10.1039/c2ee21191b. ISSN 1754-5692. Wikidata Q63413858.
