= Hanoch Daniel Wagner =

Israeli materials scientist

- חנוך דניאל וגנר
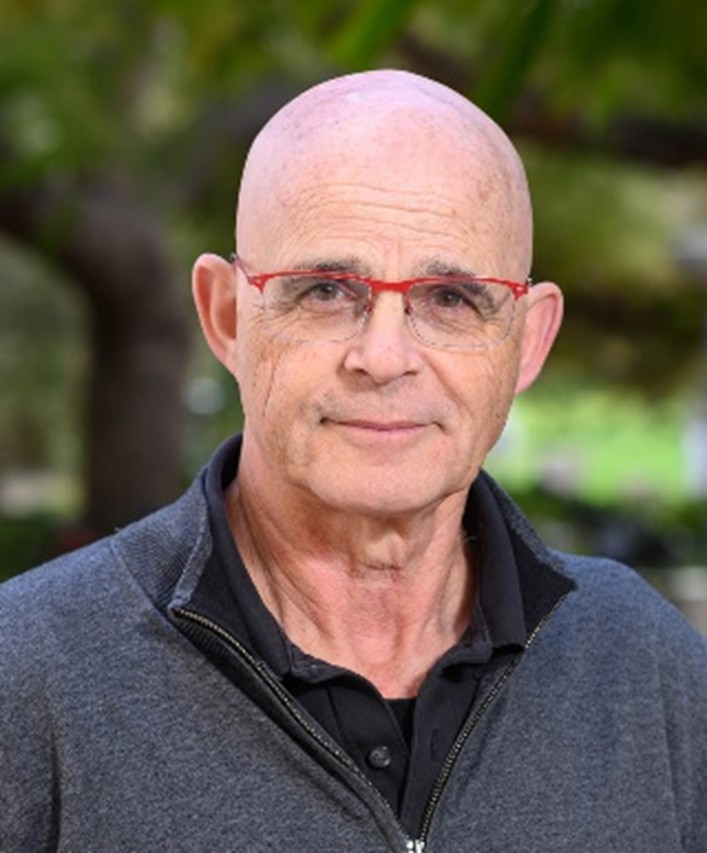
- Born: December 26, 1953 (age 72); Tel Aviv, Israel
- Education: Hebrew University of Jerusalem (M.Sc., 1977); Hebrew University of Jerusalem (PhD, 1982)
- Occupations: Material scientist, genealogist
- Employer: Weizmann Institute of Science
- Known for: Micromechanics of composite materials
- Title: Livio Norzi Professorial Chair in Materials Science (until 2024)

Hanoch Daniel Wagner (born December 26, 1953) is an Israeli materials scientist and Professor Emeritus in the Faculty of Chemistry at the Weizmann Institute of Science. An expert in the micromechanics of composite materials. He is a recipient of the Landau Prize (2014) and the Medal of Excellence from the American Society for Composites (2016).

== Biography ==
Hanoch Daniel Wagner was born in Tel Aviv, the eldest son of Paulette (née Krell) and Benjamin Wagner, Holocaust survivors who immigrated from Belgium in 1949. He has a brother, Michel. His grandfather, David Wagner, was a Yiddish journalist. At the age of two, Daniel returned with his family to Belgium and grew up in Anderlecht, a suburb of Brussels.

He completed his undergraduate studies (Licence) in Physics at the Université Libre de Bruxelles in 1975. Immediately afterward, he immigrated to Israel and pursued his Master’s and Doctoral degrees in Materials Science at the Hebrew University of Jerusalem, under the supervision of Prof. Gad Marom and Prof. Isaac Roman. During his master's studies, he served in the Nahal at Kibbutz Ma'ayan Baruch. His doctoral thesis, submitted in 1982, was titled "Elastic and Fracture Properties of Hybrid Composite Materials." He then moved to the United States for post-doctoral training at the Sibley School of Mechanical and Aerospace Engineering at Cornell University, under the guidance of Prof. Leigh Phoenix.

Upon returning to Israel in 1986, he joined the staff of the Department of Materials and Interfaces at the Weizmann Institute of Science as a scientist (later the Department of Molecular Chemistry and Materials Science). He was appointed Senior Scientist the following year, Associate Professor in 1991, and Full Professor in 2000. He retired in 2024 but continues to engage in active research. Until his retirement, he held the Livio Norzi Professorial Chair in Materials Science.

Wagner has served as a visiting researcher at ExxonMobil Research laboratories, the Technical University of Hamburg-Harburg, École Normale Supérieure, the Paul Pascal Research Center (CNRS), and the Max Planck Institute of Colloids and Interfaces in Golm-Potsdam.

== Research ==
Wagner’s research focuses on the experimental mechanics and physics of composite materials, as well as building models to understand the mechanical behavior of composites at the micro and nano scales. He investigates the micromechanics of new man-made materials, including carbon nanotubes, graphene, and nanocomposites, as well as the mechanics of biological composites such as bone, dentin, sponge silica spicules, turtle shells, scorpion cuticles, and cellular adhesion. His group has also researched applications for synthetic composites including heat shields for spacecraft atmospheric reentry, new aircraft designs (such as the Airbus A380 and Boeing 787), fishing rods, tennis rackets, bicycle frames, racing car bodies, solar panel substrates, and orbital telescopes. Over the years, Wagner has authored over 350 articles and several book chapters.

== Awards and honors ==
- Elected Chair of the Gordon Research Conference on Composite Materials (2000)
- Gutwirth Prize (2010)
- Christoffel Plantin Prize for Science (2014)
- Landau Prize for Arts and Sciences (2014)
- American Society for Composites (ASC) Medal of Excellence (2016)
- Israel Vacuum Society (IVS) Excellence Award (2019)
- Member of Academia Europaea (2020)
- Member of the European Academy of Sciences and Arts (2022)
- American Society for Composites (ASC) Award (2023)

== Personal life ==
Since 1982, he has been married to Dr. Linda Wagner (née Jankilevich), a cognitive-developmental therapist. They have two sons, one daughter, and three grandchildren. He lives at the Weizmann Institute and speaks French and Spanish.

=== Genealogy ===
Since 1995, Wagner has researched his family history, with roots in various Polish towns (Warsaw, Łódź, Zduńska Wola, Lublin, etc.), tracing his ancestry back to the 16th century. In 2001, he initiated the "Tombstone Census Project" at the Jewish cemetery of Zduńska Wola, which took approximately seven years to complete. Wagner practices genealogy professionally, including its scientific aspects; together with Dr. Neville Lamdan, he organized the first international conference on scientific genealogy at the Weizmann Institute. He has served as Chairman of the International Institute for Jewish Genealogy and Chairman of the Zduńska Wola Survivors Association, and has been a member of numerous academic and organizational committees for Jewish genealogy. He has authored over 30 genealogical articles and edited several books on genealogical research. Wagner is an Honorary Citizen of Zduńska Wola (2006) and was awarded the Award of the Israel Genealogy Society (2009).

=== Soccer ===
In his youth, Wagner played for the Anderlecht youth team and Maccabi Brussels. After moving to Israel, he was a member of the Belgian national team for the Maccabiah Games in 1977 and 1981. He played for one year with Hapoel Jerusalem, after which he decided to devote his energy to science and began playing for the ASA Jerusalem student team. During his research stay in the U.S., he played for Ithaca United and later organized a football team at the Weizmann Institute. He continued playing until the age of 64.

== Books ==
- H. Daniel Wagner (Editor), Selected Lectures on Genealogy: An Introduction to Scientific Tools, Weizmann Institute of Science (2013).
- Hanoch Daniel Wagner (Editor), Current Trends and Topics in Jewish Genealogy, MDPI (2024).
- Daniel Wagner, Monsieur Benny – Dialogues inachevés (in French), Editions L'Harmattan (2017).
