= Arne Thomas =

German chemist

- Born: April 1975 (age 51)
- Education: Max Planck Institute of Colloids and Interfaces (2004, PhD); University of Marburg (2001, Diplom)
- Scientific career
- Fields: Chemistry
- Workplaces: Technische Universität Berlin; Max Planck Institute of Colloids and Interfaces
- Doctoral advisor: Markus Antonietti

Arne Thomas (born 1975) is a German chemist who researches porous and nanostructured materials for catalytic applications.

== Career ==
Thomas studied chemistry at the University of Giessen, the University of Marburg, and at the Heriot-Watt University. He conducted his doctoral research under the direction of Markus Antonietti at the Max Planck Institute of Colloids and Interfaces and defended his PhD thesis in 2004. In 2005, following a postdoc position at Galen D. Stucky's lab at the University of California, Santa Barbara, he returned to the Max Planck Institute of Colloids and Interfaces as a group leader. Since 2009, he has been full professor for inorganic chemistry (Functional Materials) at Technische Universität Berlin. Since 2019 he is the spokesperson of the Cluster of Excellence Unifying Systems in Catalysis (UniSysCat).

== Awards ==
- 2022, 2020, 2019, 2018, and 2017 Clarivate Highly Cited Researcher
- 2019 Hollow Materials Young Innovator Award
- 2011 ERC Starting Grant
- 2011 Bayer Early Excellence in Science Award
- 2004 Georg-Manecke Award (Best PhD Thesis in Polymer Chemistry)
