= Peter Seeberger =

German chemist (born 1966)

Peter H. Seeberger
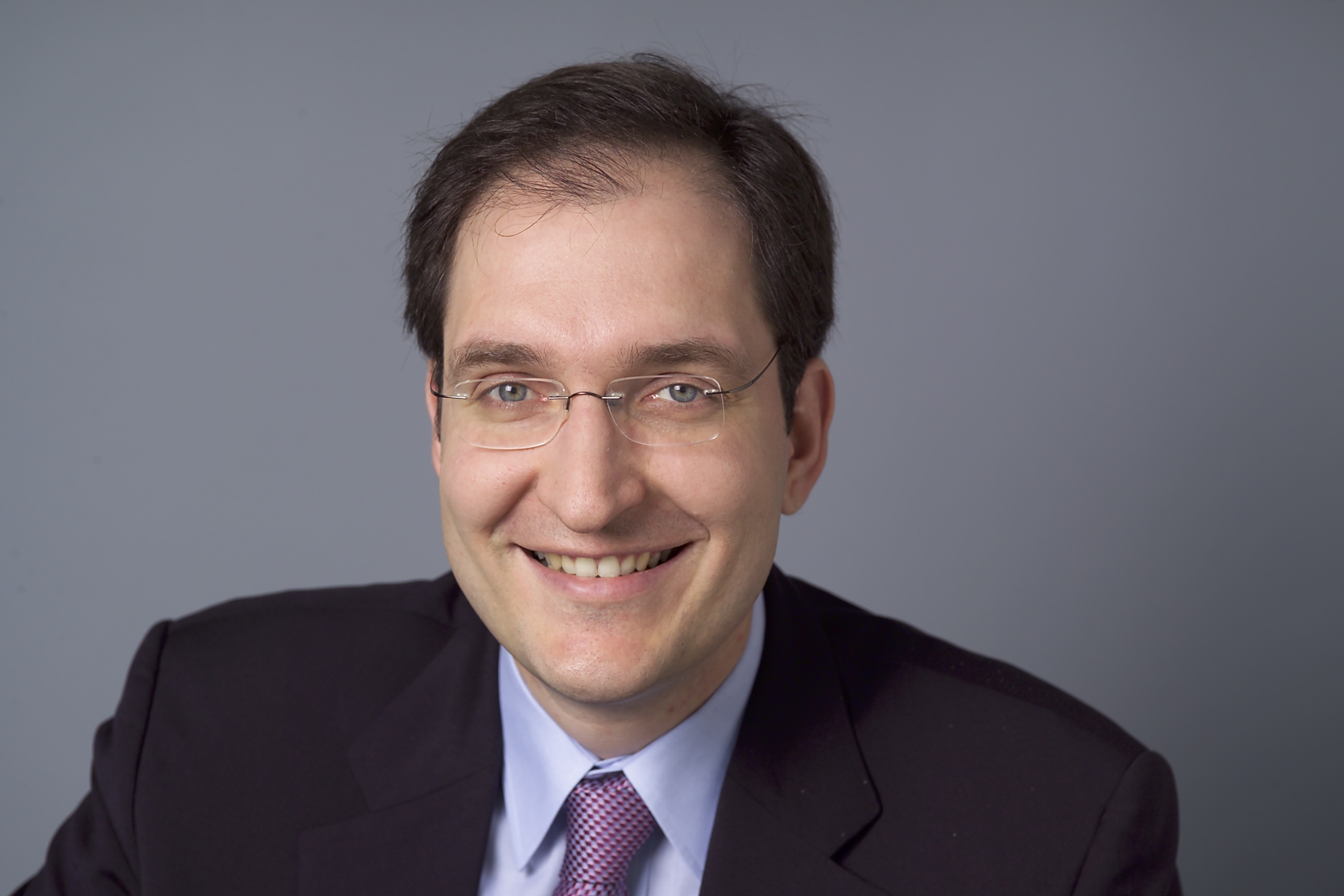
- Seeberger in 2011
- Born: 1966 (age 59–60); Nuremberg, Bavaria, West Germany
- Education: University of Erlangen-Nuremberg
- Known for: Automated carbohydrate synthesis
- Awards: Körber European Science Prize (2004); Klung Wilhelmy Science Award (2007); Claude S. Hudson Award (2009)
- Scientific career
- Fields: Chemistry; Organic chemistry Glycomics
- Workplaces: Massachusetts Institute of Technology; ETH Zurich; Max Planck Institute of Colloids and Interfaces
- Website: peter-seeberger.de

Peter H. Seeberger (born 1966 in Nuremberg) is a German chemist known for his work in glycomics and automated carbohydrate synthesis. He is a director at the Max Planck Institute of Colloids and Interfaces in Golm, near Potsdam.

== Biography ==
Seeberger studied chemistry at the University of Erlangen-Nuremberg. He completed his PhD in biochemistry in 1995 as a Fulbright scholar at the University of Colorado Boulder. After a postdoctoral fellowship at the Sloan Kettering Institute for Cancer Research in New York City, he joined the Massachusetts Institute of Technology (MIT) in 1998 as an assistant professor. In 2002 he was promoted to Firmenich Associate Professor of Chemistry.

In 2003, Seeberger became professor of organic chemistry in the Department of Chemistry and Applied Biosciences at ETH Zurich. He also served as an affiliate professor at the Burnham Institute in La Jolla, California.

Since 2008, Seeberger has been one of the directors of the Max Planck Institute of Colloids and Interfaces in Golm, near Potsdam, where he heads the Department of Biomolecular Systems. His research focuses on the chemistry and biology of carbohydrates, particularly in the field of glycomics.

== Research ==
Seeberger is known for developing automated methods for the synthesis of complex carbohydrates and glycoconjugates. His work has contributed to advances in vaccine development, diagnostics, and the understanding of carbohydrate-related biological processes. In 2022, Seeberger became a founding director of the Center for the Transformation of Chemistry (CTC), a German research initiative focused on sustainable and circular chemical processes.

== Awards and Honors ==
Seeberger received the Körber European Science Prize in 2004, the Klung Wilhelmy Science Award in 2007, and the Claude S. Hudson Award in 2009. Additional honours include the Humanity in Science Award in 2015 and the Stifterverband Science Prize in 2017. Since May 2011, he has served as Editor-in-Chief of the Beilstein Journal of Organic Chemistry. In 2013, he was elected a member of the Berlin-Brandenburg Academy of Sciences and Humanities.
