= Oranienburg Palace =

Location in Oranienburg, Germany

Coordinates: 52°45′17″N 13°14′12″E

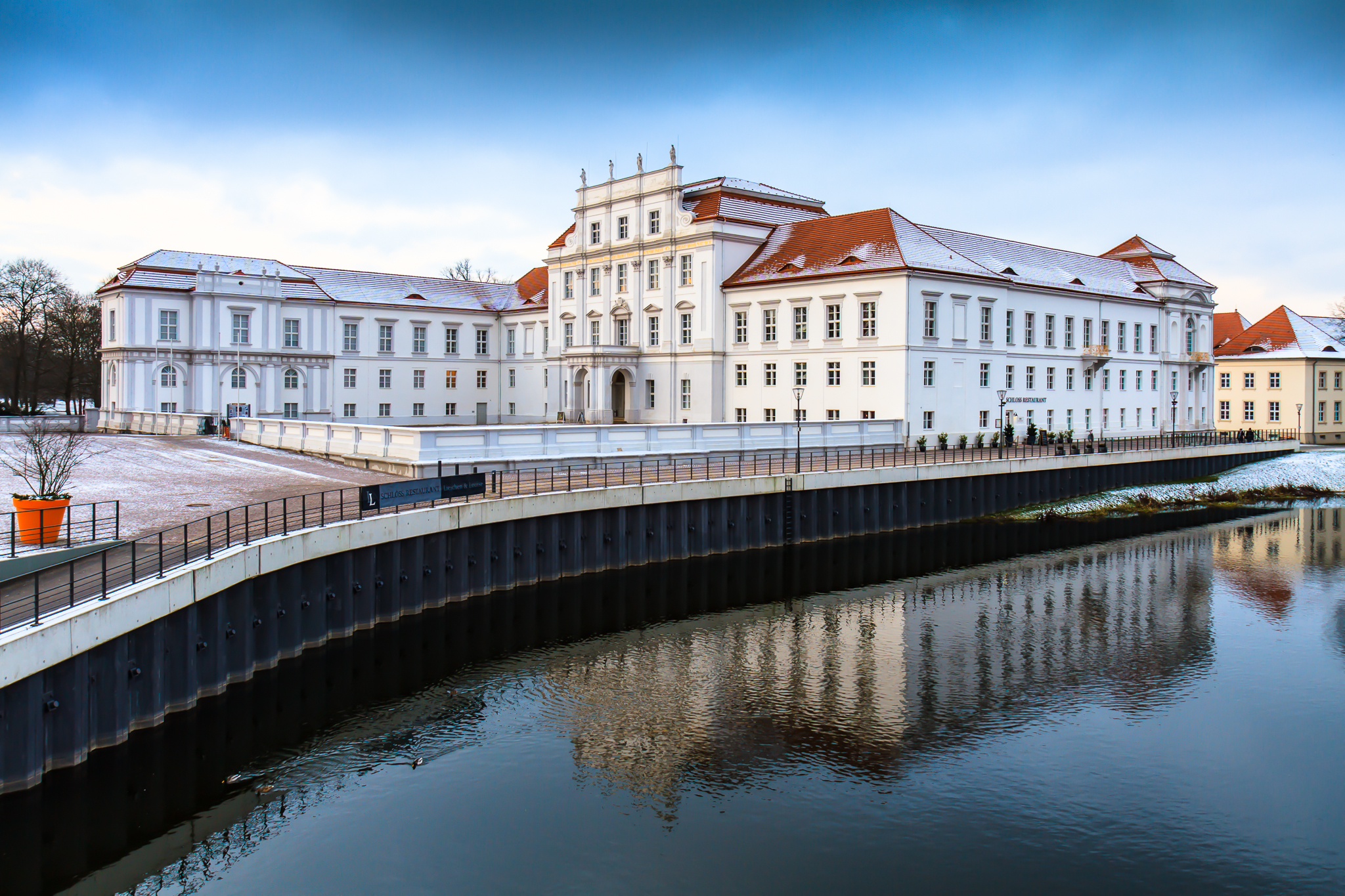
Schloss Oranienburg, front side

Oranienburg Palace (German: Schloss Oranienburg) is a Schloss located in the town of Oranienburg in Germany.

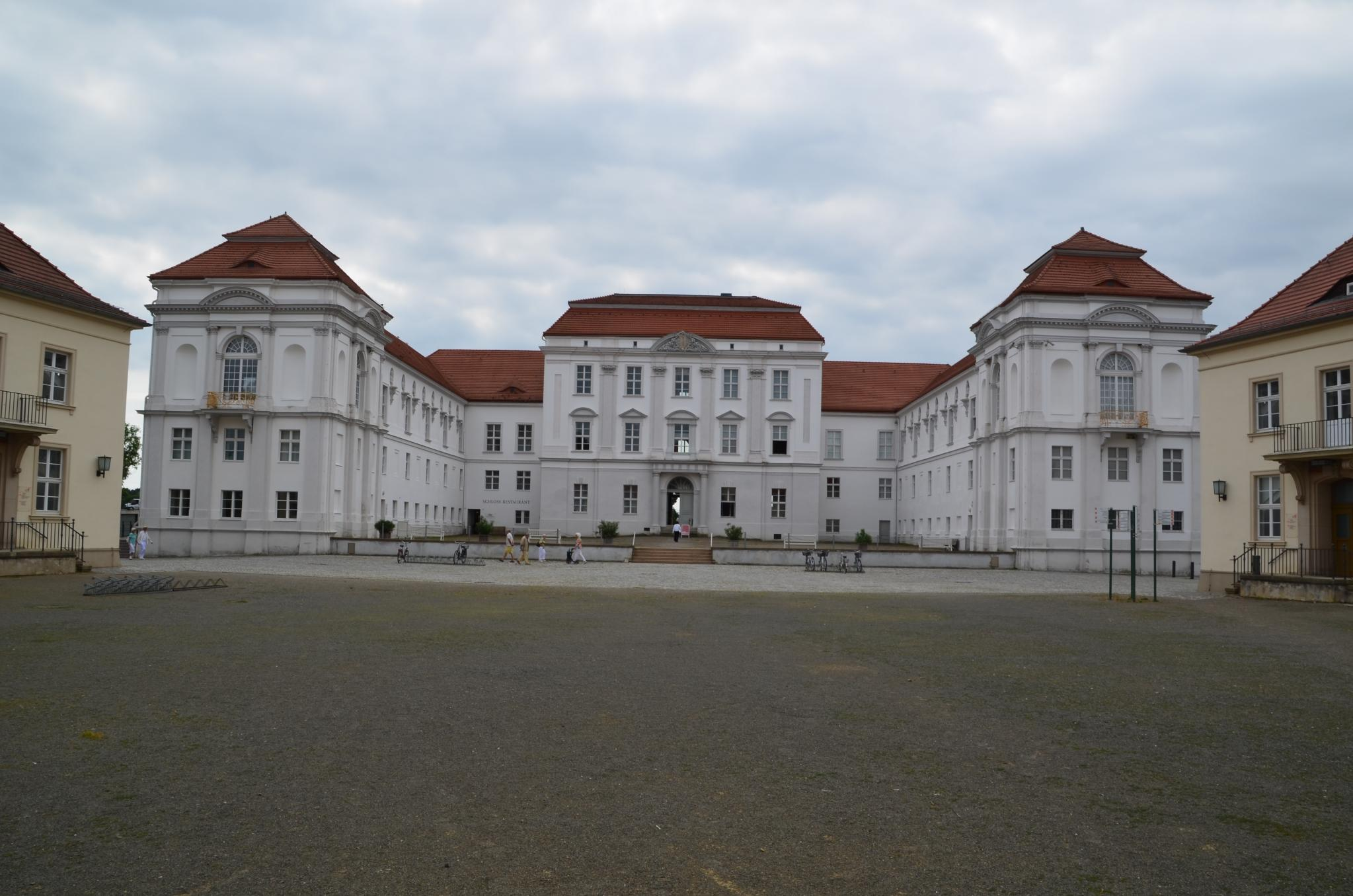
Back side

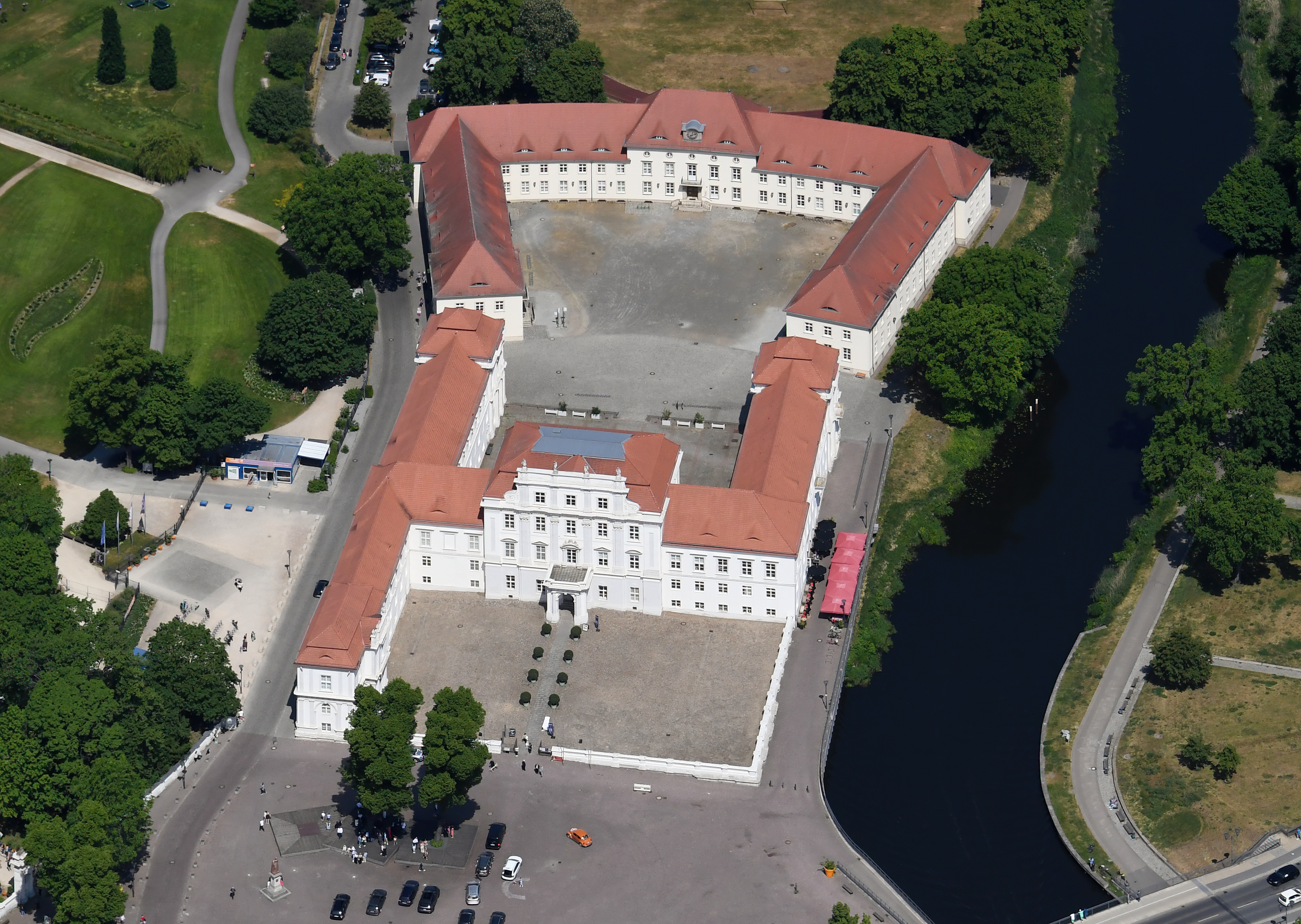
Aerial view

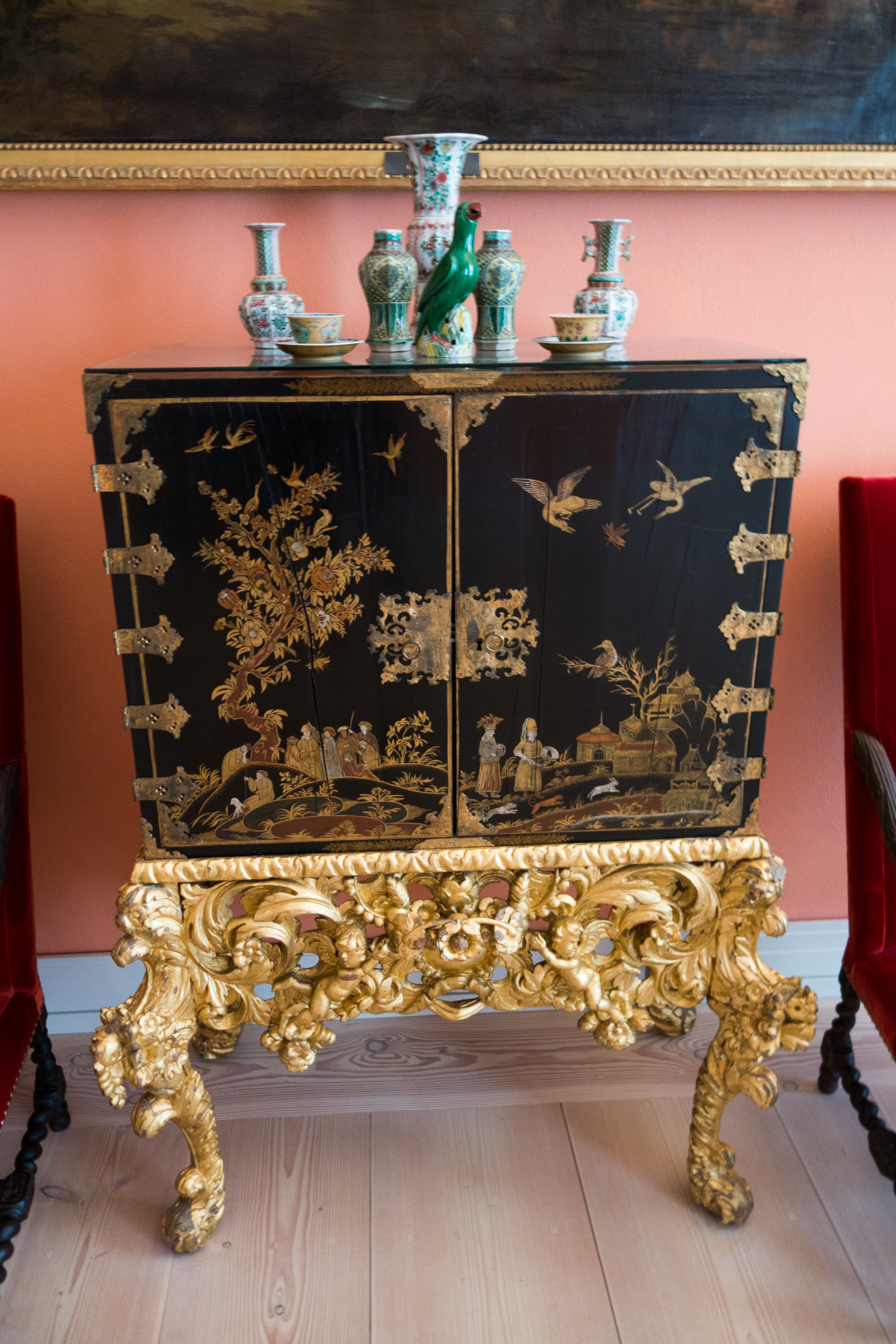
Chinese cabinet

It is the oldest Baroque Schloss in the Margraviate of Brandenburg and was built from 1651 to 1655 by Louise Henriette of Orange-Nassau, the first wife of Frederick William, Elector of Brandenburg, on the site of an older hunting lodge. The architect was Johann Gregor Memhardt. The building was based on the contemporary architecture of Dutch classicism in its external form, with its vertical orientation and the turrets on the side wings. The extensive garden was primarily used for the cultivation of trees, ornamental shrubs, flowers and vegetables. Among other things, the Electress introduced potatoes and cauliflower to the Mark Brandenburg.

From 1689, the Electress' son, Frederick I, who loved splendour, had the palace and gardens enlarged, influenced by Italian and French baroque architecture. Johann Arnold Nering was in charge of construction until 1699. He changed the facade of the corps de logis and added two north rear wings with final pavilions, connected by a walk-in arcade, and thus a second courtyard. After him, Johann Friedrich Eosander von Göthe mainly complemented the interior design.

After the death of Frederick I in 1713, the palace was hardly used. His son Frederick William I only lodged occasionally in Oranienburg, and just the most necessary funds were granted for the maintenance of the palace. His son Frederick II transferred the estate to his younger brother Prince Augustus William of Prussia on the occasion of his marriage in 1742. Augustus William died here in 1758 at the age of only 35. His widow Luise of Brunswick used it until her death in 1780. In 1794 the later Prussian Queen Louise of Mecklenburg-Strelitz received it as a gift.

From 1858 to 1925 it was converted into a teacher's seminary, 1933–37 SS barracks, then police academy. Damaged by bombs in World War II, it was externally restored in 1948-1954. After a temporary use by the Red Army, it was an officer school for the barracked People's Police from 1952 and later barracks for the Border Troops of the German Democratic Republic until 1990.

Today the palace is a museum of the Prussian Palaces and Gardens Foundation Berlin-Brandenburg. Numerous valuable objects of baroque handicrafts and paintings are on display, including paintings with connections to the castle and its inhabitants, partly also individual pieces of the original interior.

== The palaces of the princesses of Orange ==
Albertine Agnes and her sisters each built a palace elsewhere in the Netherlands and Germany, every one of them named after the House of Orange:

- Oranienbaum Palace for Henriëtte Catharina
- Oranienhof in Bad Kreuznach for Maria of Orange-Nassau
- Schloss Oranienstein for Albertine Agnes of Nassau
- Palace of Oranjewoud for Albertina as well
