= Johann Gregor Memhardt =

Austrian architect (1607–1678)

Johann Gregor Memhardt or Memhard (1607 in Linz an der Donau – 1678 in Berlin) was a master builder, architect and politician.

== Life ==
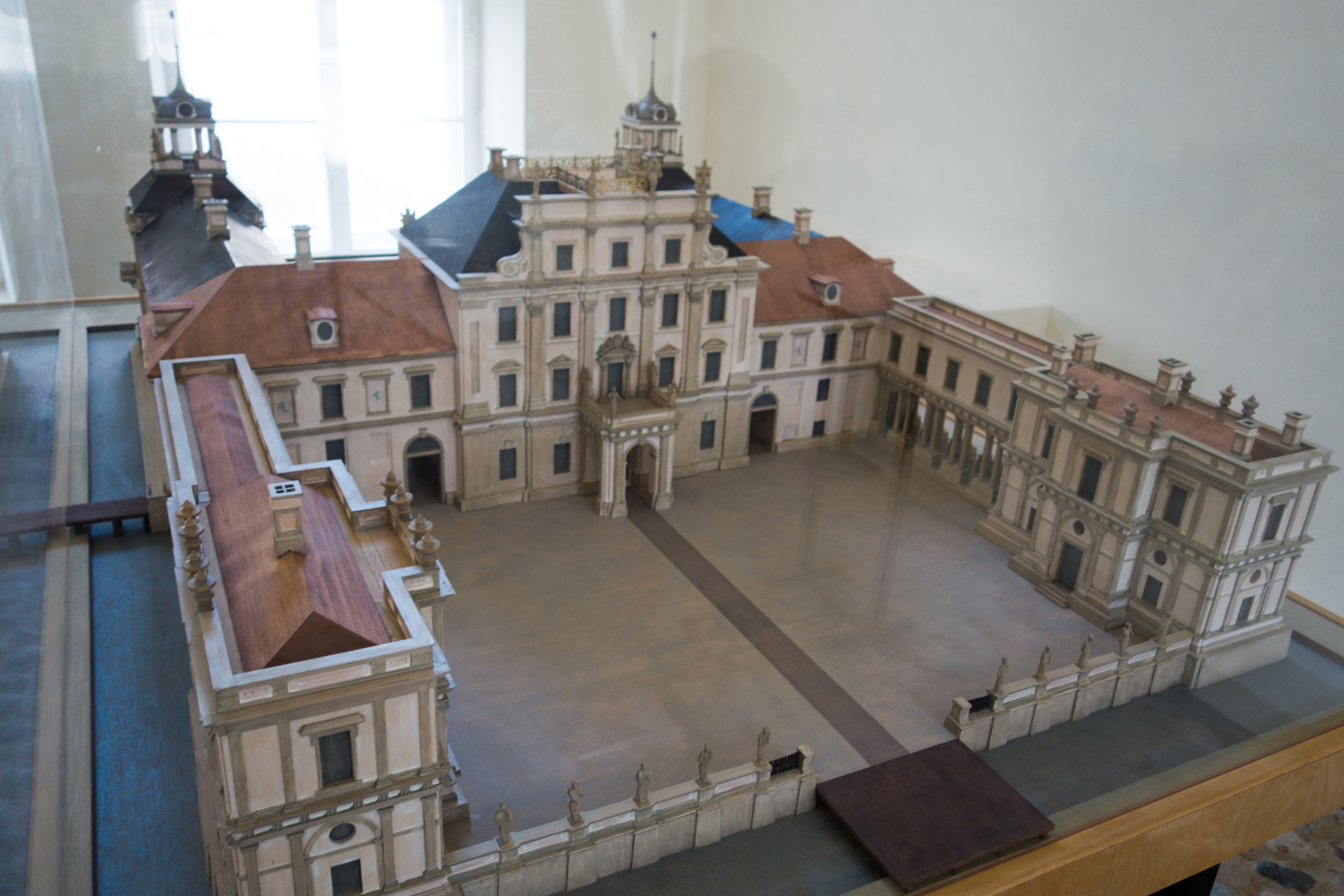
Model of Oranienburg Palace

Memhardt emigrated from Linz to the Netherlands in 1622, where he probably learned the art of fortification. He served as a military engineer with George William, Elector of Brandenburg from 1638 onwards and in 1641 was appointed court engineer. Under his supervision the Berlin Palace was renovated and a chapel built for the Electress Louise Henriette. In the Lustgarten he built a 'Lusthaus', known from the plan of Berlin published in 1652. From 1651 Oranienburg Palace and its gardens north of Berlin were built to Memhardt's designs.
