= Marcus Mlynikowski =

German footballer (born 1992)

Personal information
- Date of birth: 6 July 1992 (age 34)
- Place of birth: Oranienburg, Germany
- Height: 1.80 m (5 ft 11 in)
- Position: Left-back

Team information
- Current team: Middelfart
- Number: 13

Youth career
- –2010: Union Berlin

Senior career*
Years	Team	Apps	(Gls)
2010–2012	Werder Bremen II	11	(0)
2012–2013	Sportfreunde Siegen	4	(0)
2013–2014	Union Berlin II	28	(0)
2014–2015	Berliner AK 07	23	(2)
2015–2017	Hertha BSC II	53	(10)
2017	Hertha BSC	0	(0)
2015–2018	Chemnitzer FC	27	(1)
2018–2019	Berliner AK 07	43	(1)
2020	Næstved	14	(0)
2020–2022	Fremad Amager	41	(1)
2022	→ Kolding (loan)	4	(1)
2022–	Middelfart	63	(1)

International career
2009	Germany U18	1	(0)

Managerial career
- 2024: Kolding (academy staff)
- 2024–: Esbjerg fB (academy staff)
- * Club domestic league appearances and goals as of 20:11, 6 January 2025 (UTC)

Marcus Mlynikowski (born 6 July 1992) is a German professional footballer who plays as a left-back for Danish 2nd Division club Middelfart Boldklub.

== Career ==
On 12 August 2020, Mlynikowski joined Danish 1st Division club Fremad Amager. Mlynikowski was loaned out to Danish 2nd Division club Kolding IF for the rest of the season on 31 January 2022. On 20 July 2022, Mlynikowski joined Middelfart Boldklub.

During 2024, alongside his playing career in Middelfart, Mlynikowski worked at Kolding IF's academy as a physical coach. In December 2024 he was employed in a similar position at Esbjerg fB.
