= Beilstein Journal of Organic Chemistry =

- Discipline: Organic chemistry
- Language: English
- Edited by: Peter Seeberger

Publication details
- History: 2005–present
- Publisher: Beilstein Institute for the Advancement of Chemical Sciences, until February 2008 in partnership with BioMed Central
- Open access: Yes
- Impact factor: 2.2 (2023)

Standard abbreviations
- ISO 4: Beilstein J. Org. Chem.

Indexing
- CODEN: BJOCBH
- ISSN: 1860-5397
- LCCN: 2005243875
- OCLC no.: 61387227

Links
- Journal homepage

The Beilstein Journal of Organic Chemistry is a peer-reviewed diamond open-access scientific journal established in 2005. The journal is published and completely funded by the Beilstein Institute for the Advancement of Chemical Sciences, a German non-profit foundation. The editor-in-chief is Peter Seeberger (Max Planck Institute of Colloids and Interfaces). It is a member of the Free Journal Network.

Scientific videos are available for selected articles of the journal.

== Abstracting and indexing ==
The journal is abstracted and indexed in Science Citation Index Expanded, Current Contents, Scopus, Chemical Abstracts Service and the Directory of Open Access Journals

According to the Journal Citation Reports, the journal has a 2023 impact factor of 2.2.
