= Beilstein Institute =

German foundation

The Beilstein-Institut for the Advancement of Chemical Sciences is an independent non-governmental and non-profit foundation located in Frankfurt am Main (German: Beilstein-Institut zur Förderung der Chemischen Wissenschaften). Founded in 1951 by the Max Planck Society in honor of Friedrich Konrad Beilstein, today the Institut supports chemistry and related fields with diamond open access journals, the development of standards, funding and hosting scientific events, and other projects to support the communication and distribution of scientific content.

The foundation was involved in producing the comprehensive Crossfire Beilstein database, first introduced in 1994.

In 2005, the institute initiated the diamond open access Beilstein Journal of Organic Chemistry and in 2010, the Beilstein Journal of Nanotechnology.
