= Jens Münster =

German politician (born 1990)

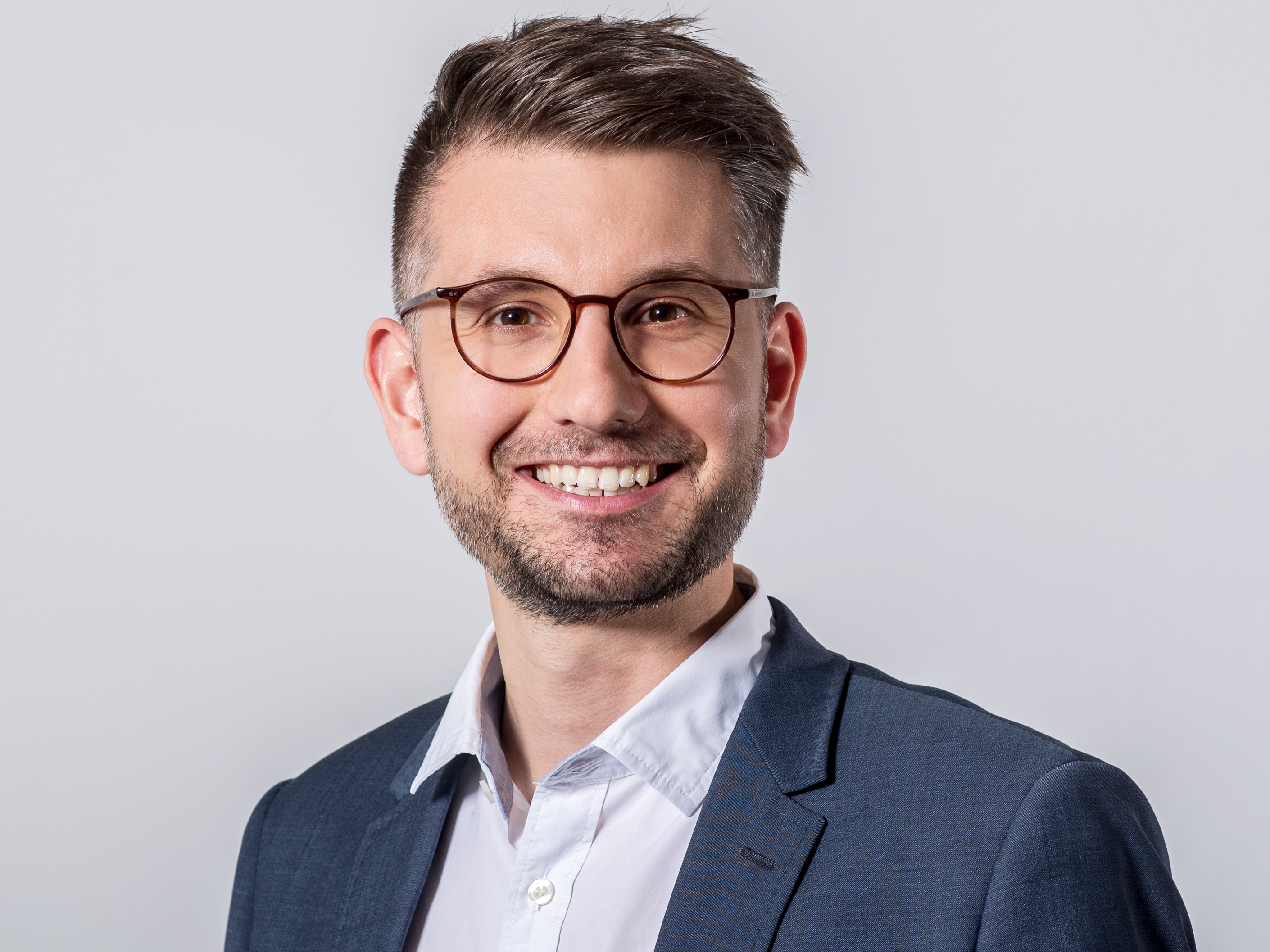
- Münster in 2021

Member of the Landtag of Rhineland-Palatinate
- Incumbent
- Assumed office 1 November 2023
- Preceded by: Anke Beilstein
- Constituency: Cochem-Zell

Personal details
- Born: 13 September 1990 (age 35)
- Party: Christian Democratic Union

Jens Münster (born 13 September 1990) is a German politician serving as a member of the Landtag of Rhineland-Palatinate since 2023. He has served as chairman of the Christian Democratic Union in Cochem-Zell since 2023. From 2018 to 2023, he served chairman of the Young Union in Rhineland-Palatinate.
