= Golm transmitter =

Coordinates: 52°24′5″N 12°58′32″E

Golm transmitter or Sender Golm was a medium wave broadcasting facility on the area of a former Reichsarbeitsdienst officer candidate school at Kuhforter Damm in Golm near Potsdam. It entered service in 1948 as the central broadcast transmitter for Brandenburg state. Until 1979 it used a wooden lattice tower of 98 m (322 ft) height with a horizontal wooden cross on its top as its antenna support. The ends of the beams of this cross were connected with wires. From the centre of each of these horizontal wires, a vertical wire was run down to the antenna tuner which was located in a building under the feet of the tower construction. The antenna of Golm transmitter consisted therefore of 4 T-antennas connected in parallel, forming an omnidirectional antenna with a natural wavelength of 528 m. The transmitter was built from second-hand parts obtained by dismantling a site in Reichenbach, Upper Lusatia. Test transmissions were undertaken on 16 April 1948, and from 1 May 1948 the facility operated on 564 kHz.

The wooden tower of Golm transmitter was not a new construction. It was built from parts of two wooden masts originally erected in 1936 at Rehmate, the location of Zehlendorf transmitter, as supports for shortwave antennas. These were (together with a third mast) the only antenna towers on this site not dismantled for war reparations following World War II. As materials for structural engineering were not easily available in the Soviet occupation zone, it was decided to dismantle this structure and re-erect it as an antenna tower at Golm, although wooden radio towers was no longer state-of-the-art.

After the demolition of the wooden radio tower of Wiederau transmitter in 1953, the tower of Golm transmitter remained the tallest wooden structure in the GDR until 1979. It was a well-known landmark of the Potsdam area. On October 25, 1979 it was demolished with explosives because of structural deterioration. It was replaced by two 51 m (167 ft) tall guyed steel lattice mast radiators. One of these served as the main antenna, the other as backup.

The facility was operated by Deutsche Post. Initially, the programmes of Landessender Potsdam was broadcast, later those of Radio Wolga, Berliner Rundfunk, Berliner Welle, and Radio DDR 1 and Radio DDR 2. In 1991 the programme of Berliner Rundfunk was broadcast on 693 kHz. Transmissions ceased on 20 August 1992, and dismantlement was ordered on 20 September 1993. The guyed masts together with the other facilities were dismantled in 1993/1994. The area is now covered in vegetation, only parts of the foundations of one mast remain.
