= Friedrich Dülon =

Virtuoso flutist

Friedrich Ludwig Dülon
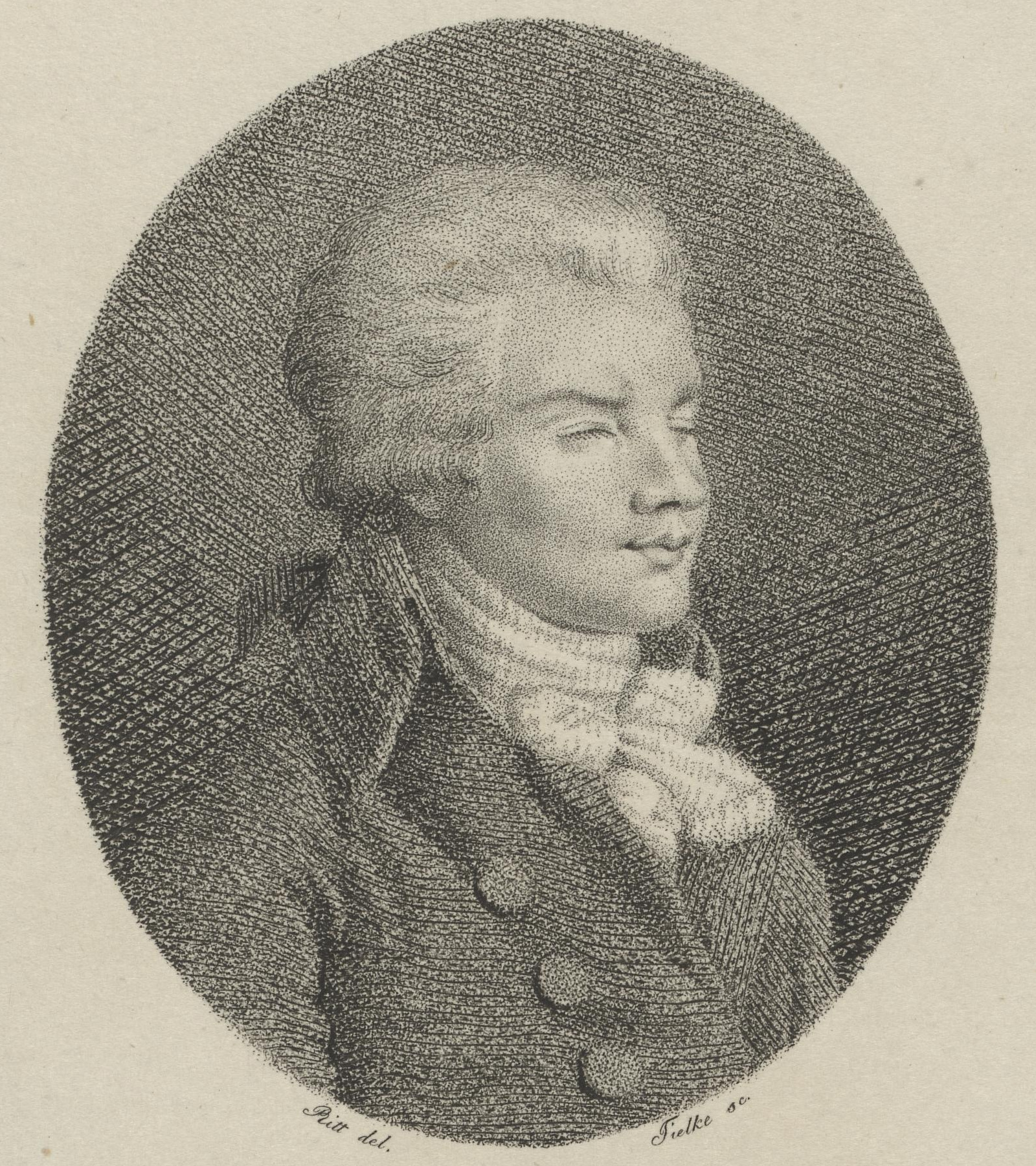
- Born: 14 August 1768; Oranienburg
- Died: 7 July 1826 (aged 57); Würzburg
- Occupations: Flutist and composer

Friedrich Ludwig Dülon (14 August 1768 – 7 July 1826) was one of the most prominent and famous flute-virtuoso musicians of the Classical era, being one of the first flutists to be considered gifted on Western concert flute. At the age of 40 he had acquired more than 300 concerts in his repertoire. Christian Friedrich Daniel Schubart devoted a 9-verse poem entitled The blind flute player Dülon on the journey.^{d}

== Life ==
Dülon was born in Oranienburg, Kingdom of Prussia. Although he went blind due to an eye infection caused by medical malpractice when he was only six weeks old,^{a} this did not prevent him from taking music lessons, first from his father, a music-loving tax official, and later from organist Johann Karl Anderson (1774–1815) who taught him piano and figured bass, and the equally blind flutist Joseph Winter who had arrived in town on 16 March 1778. When he was 9 his musical talent struck by the fact that he had already composed a minuet. It was natural for him to play Quantz's flute concerto, which he had learned by heart while listening to his father play it on the ridge, as well as improvise and dictate his own compositions so that they might be scribed. A year later the prodigy child Dülon was already performing as a soloist in Stendal. His first public concert took place in Berlin on 9 October 1781, like this his famous career as a touring virtuoso.

During the 1780s Dülon toured constantly all over Europe with his father and sister. During a visited to Carl Philipp Emanuel Bach in Hamburg in 1783,^{b} he played the A-minor sonata to him who then commented that it was really odd that the king, for whom he had written that sonata, could not play it unlike the blind Dülon. On the other hand, Dülon suggested that Bach play his Hamburger Sonata in G Major, Wq. 133 instead. He was also on friendly terms with Karl Benda,^{c} son of Czech violinist and composer Franz Benda. In the summer of 1789, Friedrich Hölderlin took flute lessons with Dülon in Tübingen. Up to 1787 his travels took him to Leipzig where he played duets with Johann George Tromlitz, to Berlin, where he met Johann Philipp Kirnberger and Johann Friedrich Reichardt, and also London, where he performed at court.

In October 1790 he crossed paths with Wolfgang Amadeus Mozart for the first time when of the festivities for Emperor Leopold II's coronation in Frankfurt, and later during one of Dülon's concert at Emanuel Schikaneder's Theater an der Wien in Vienna on 15 April 1791, where he played a flute concerto by Giovanni Mane Giornovichi along with his brother-in-law Herr Reinstein.^{e} He then spent about five years in St Petersburg from 1792 as a royal musician before returning to Germany in 1798 with a pension granted by the Emperor Paul I of Russia. From 1800 he resided in Marienburg, where he wrote his autobiography by means of an alphabet which had been invented for him by a college professor in Dresden. In 1823 he moved to Würzburg, where he died on 7 July 1826.

== Musical works ==
Dülon's surviving compositions include a flute concerto, 16 duos and a set of 11 caprices for solo flute.

- Duets Opus 6 No. 2 in D major for Flute and Viola,
- Duets Opus 6 No. 2 in G major for Flute and Viola
- Duets Opus 6 No. 3 in D minor for Flute and Viola
- Duo Opus 5 No. 1 for Two Flutes
- Duo Opus 5 No. 2 for Two Flutes
- Duo Opus 5 No. 3 for Two Flutes
- Three Duos Opus 6 for Flute and Viola

== Additional informations ==
=== Sources ===
- C.M. Wieland: Dülon the blind flute player's life and opinions of his own, (Zürich, 1807-8) [autobiography]
- J.A. Rice: The Blind Dülon and his Magic Flute, ML, lxxi (1990), pp. 25–51 [incl. list of works]
- Ardal Powell: The Keyed Flute by Johann George Tromlitz (Oxford, 1996)
- Ardal Powell: The Flute, Yale University Press (2002), p. 131, New Haven, ISBN 0-300-09498-1
- Friedrich Blume: The music past and present. Bärenreiter, Kassel 1949-1986.
- Adolph Goldberg: Portraits and biographies of outstanding flute virtuoso and composer-dilettante, Berlin (1906), Moeck, Celle 1987 (rep), ISBN 3-87549-028-2
- Herbert Koelbel: From the Flute, Bärenreiter, 1966, ISBN 3-7618-0061-4
- Ursula Pešek, Željiko Pešek: Flute music from three centuries, Bärenreiter, Kassel 1990th ISBN 3-7618-0985-9
- Leta E. Miller: C. P. E. Bach and Friedrich Ludwig DÜlon: Composition and improvisation in late 18th-century Germany, Early Music (1995), vol. 23, no. 1, pp. 65–80, ISSN 0306-1078

=== Notes ===
- ^ a: The distinction between light and dark was still possible for him.
- ^ b: Dülon's father had invented the long F flute by then.
- ^ c: Benda was the concertmaster of the Royal Opera House in Potsdam at the time.
- ^ d: The first four lines of his poem reads:
  Du guter Dülon klage nicht,
  Daß Nacht umflort dein Angesicht;
  Hast du nicht tiefes Herzgefühl?
  Nicht zauberisches Flötenspiel?
- ^ e: It is for this meeting that musicologist John A. Rice suggests Dülon might have well been the real inspiration behind Mozart's Tamino in his The Magic Flute.
