= Unifying Systems in Catalysis =

German research network

UniSysCat logo

Cluster of Excellence Unifying Systems in Catalysis (UniSysCat) is an interdisciplinary research network established by the German Research Foundation (DFG) as part of the federal and state initiative, Excellence Strategy (dutch: Exzellenzstrategie). UniSysCat is the successor to the Cluster of Excellence Unifying Concepts in Catalysis (UniCat).

Execellence Strategy is a federal-state agreement under Article 91b of the Basic Law for the sustainable strengthening of top-level research and the international competitiveness of German universities.The effort includes 2 projects: Clusters of Excellence (EXC) and Universities of Excellence (EXU)
The Clusters of Excellence focuses on supporting project-based funding in internationally competitive research fields at a university or university consortium.

Approximately 300 researchers from the Berlin and Potsdam areas work at UniSysCat, addressing current challenges in catalysis research. The funding period runs from January 1, 2019, to December 30, 2025.

== Research Focus ==
UniSysCat consists of around 60 research groups working on both experimental and theoretical approaches in molecular and structural biology, biochemistry, biophysics, chemical synthesis, physical and theoretical chemistry, and physics. The research focuses on understanding and controlling chemo-catalytic and bio-catalytic networks, as well as exploring how chemical and biological processes can be integrated to create catalytic systems with new functions.

== Participating institutions ==
The participating institutions includes:

- Technische Universität Berlin
- Humboldt Universität zu Berlin
- Freie Universität Berlin
- Universität Potsdam
- Charité - Universitätsmedizin
- Fritz-Haber-Institut der Max-Planck-Gesellschaft
- Max-Planck-Institute for Colloids and Interfaces
- Helmholtz-Zentrum Berlin
- Leibniz-Forschungsinstitut für Molekulare Pharmakologie

== Other Initiatives ==
=== BasCat ===
In 2011, UniSysCat partnered with BASF to establish the BasCat joint laboratory at Technische Universität Berlin (TU Berlin). BasCat focuses on basic research in heterogeneous catalysis, specifically the catalytic transformation of hydrocarbons into value-added products.

=== Chemical Invention Factory ===
The Chemical Invention Factory (CIF), also known as the John Warner Center for Start-ups in Green Chemistry, is a project at TU Berlin designed to encourage young scientists to start their own companies. Originating from the TU INKULAB program, CIF supports research in green chemistry, materials science, and nanotechnology.

=== INKULAB ===
The INKULAB project, which concluded in April 2020, aimed to promote young entrepreneurs in the field of chemistry. Its primary objective was to simplify the transition from research to startup, addressing the complex infrastructure typically required for science companies. Startups were offered modular, purpose-built laboratories made from containers to facilitate this process.

== Awards ==
The Clara Immerwahr Award, launched in 2011 by the UniCat cluster, promotes young women in catalysis research. This annual award is presented to a young female scientist (postdoctoral or early-career researcher) who has demonstrated excellence in catalysis. The award includes a €15,000 grant for a research stay within a UniSysCat research group, encouraging collaboration and strengthening ties with the network.

The Clara Immerwahr Award is named in honor of Dr. Clara Immerwahr (1870–1915), the first woman in Germany to earn a doctorate in physical chemistry, in 1900.
