= Peter Fratzl =

Austrian physicist (born 1958)

- Born: 1958 (age 67–68); Vienna

Academic background
- Education: Ecole polytechnique
- Alma mater: University of Vienna

Academic work
- Institutions: Max Planck Institute of Colloids and Interfaces

Peter Fratzl (born 13 September 1958 in Vienna) is an Austrian physicist and director at the Max Planck Institute of Colloids and Interfaces in Potsdam.

== Life ==
After studying in Strasbourg and Paris, and graduating as an engineer from the École polytechnique in 1980, Fratzl received his doctorate in physics from the University of Vienna (1983). After that, he received his habilitation in the field of solid-state physics (1991) and worked as an assistant and associate professor at the Institute of Materials Physics at the University of Vienna (1986–1998). In addition to his role as director of the Max Planck Institute of Colloids and Interfaces (since 2003), Fratzl is also an external collaborator at the Ludwig Boltzmann Institute for Osteology in Vienna (since 1993). He was a visiting researcher at Heriot-Watt University in Edinburgh (1993–1994), visiting professor at LMU Munich (1997), full professor of metal physics at the University of Leoben, and director of the Erich Schmid Institute for Materials Science of the Austrian Academy of Sciences (1998–2003). He is also Honorary Professor at Humboldt University of Berlin (since 2004) and at the University of Potsdam (since 2009). From 2017 to 2020, Peter Fratzl was Chairman of the Chemical-Physical-Technical Section of the Max Planck Society. Since 2019, he has been co-director of the Cluster of Excellence Matters of Activity.

Peter Fratzl has headed the Department of Biomaterials at the Max Planck Institute of Colloids and Interfaces since 2003 and is one of the pioneers in the field of biological and biomimetic materials. His studies of natural materials such as wood, bones, mussel shells, glass sponges, protein fibers, and insect shells have provided materials scientists with clues for the development of new material concepts. In addition, his work has also influenced medically oriented work on osteoporosis and bone regeneration. Due to his award-winning interdisciplinary research, Peter Fratzl is one of the most exposed representatives of modern science (listed as a materials scientist by Thomson Reuters in "highly-cited researchers"). Fratzl is the author and co-author of about 500 publications in journals and books.

== Other Activities ==
- Corresponding member abroad of the Austrian Academy of Sciences (since 2007)
- Member and PI of the Cluster of Excellence "Image-Knowledge-Design" at Humboldt-Universität of Berlin
- Speaker of the Priority Program of the German Research Foundation (DFG) "Biomimetic Materials Research: Functionality by Hierarchical Structuring of Materials".
- Member of the editorial board of the journals Science and Nature.
- Member of scientific advisory boards and supervisory boards of research institutions, e.g.: Review Board Materials Science, the Austrian Science Fund (FWF) and the Maier-Leibnitz Centre.

== Awards ==
- 2008: Max Planck Research Award for pioneering achievements in the field of biological and biomimetic materials – together with Robert S. Langer
- 2010: Gottfried Wilhelm Leibniz Prize of the German Research Foundation
- 2010: Honorary doctorate from the University of Montpellier
- 2012: Fellow of the American Materials Research Society
- 2013: Member of the National Academy of Science and Engineering (Acatech)
- 2015: Member of the Academy of Sciences and Literature of Mainz
- 2015: Member of the Berlin-Brandenburg Academy of Sciences and Humanities
- 2020: Member of the National Academy of Engineering
