= Oranienburg =

- Town
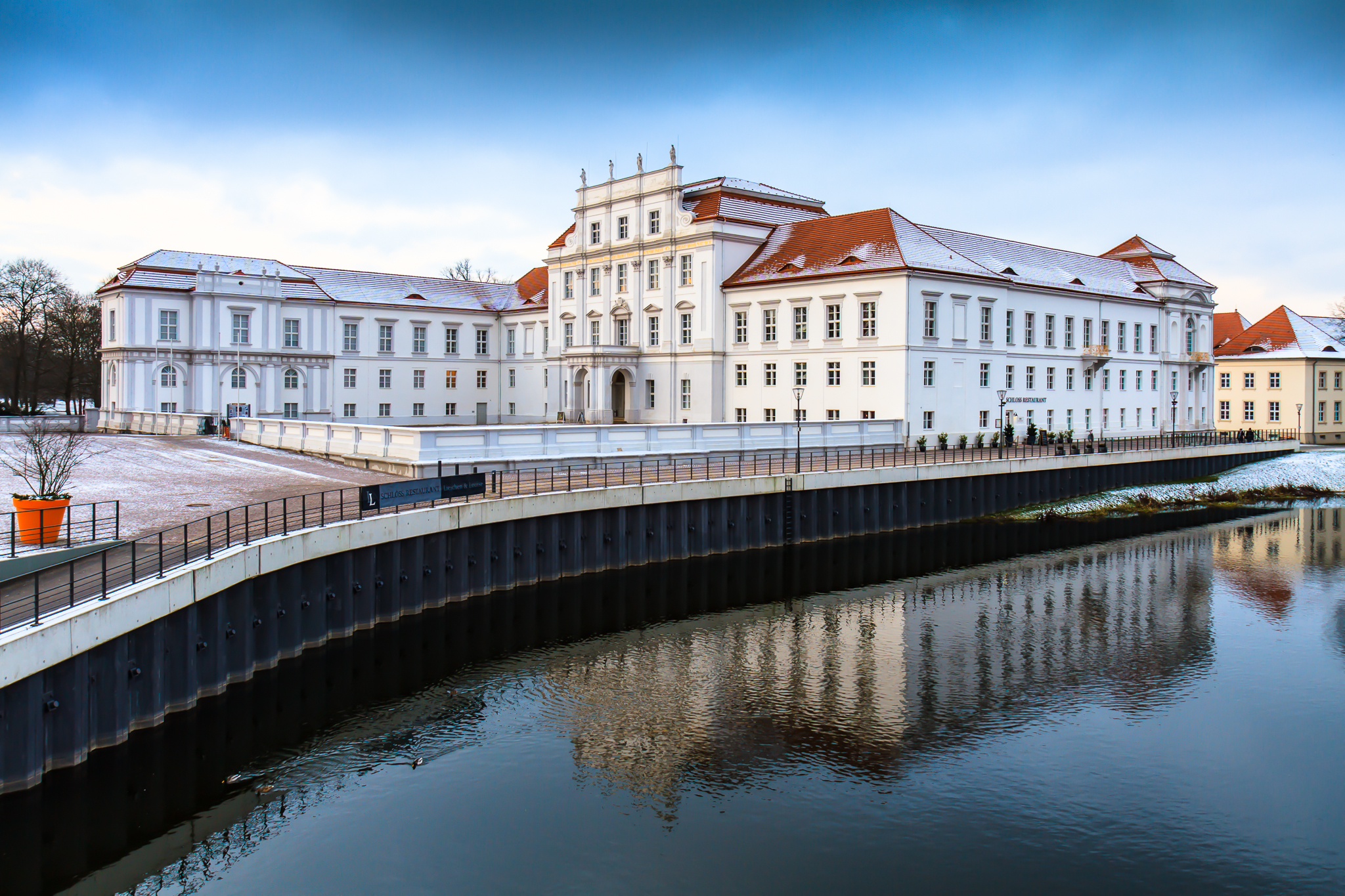
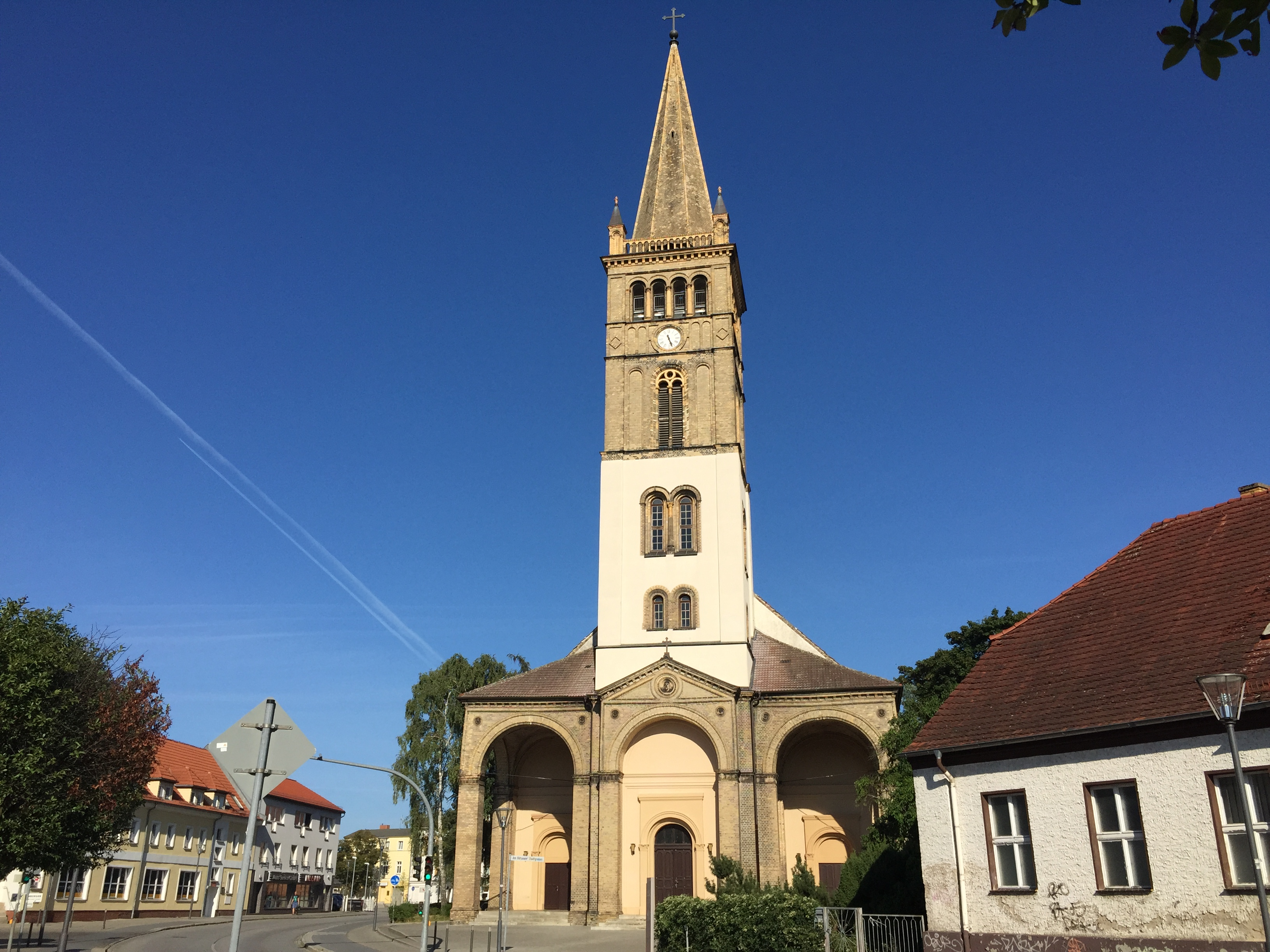
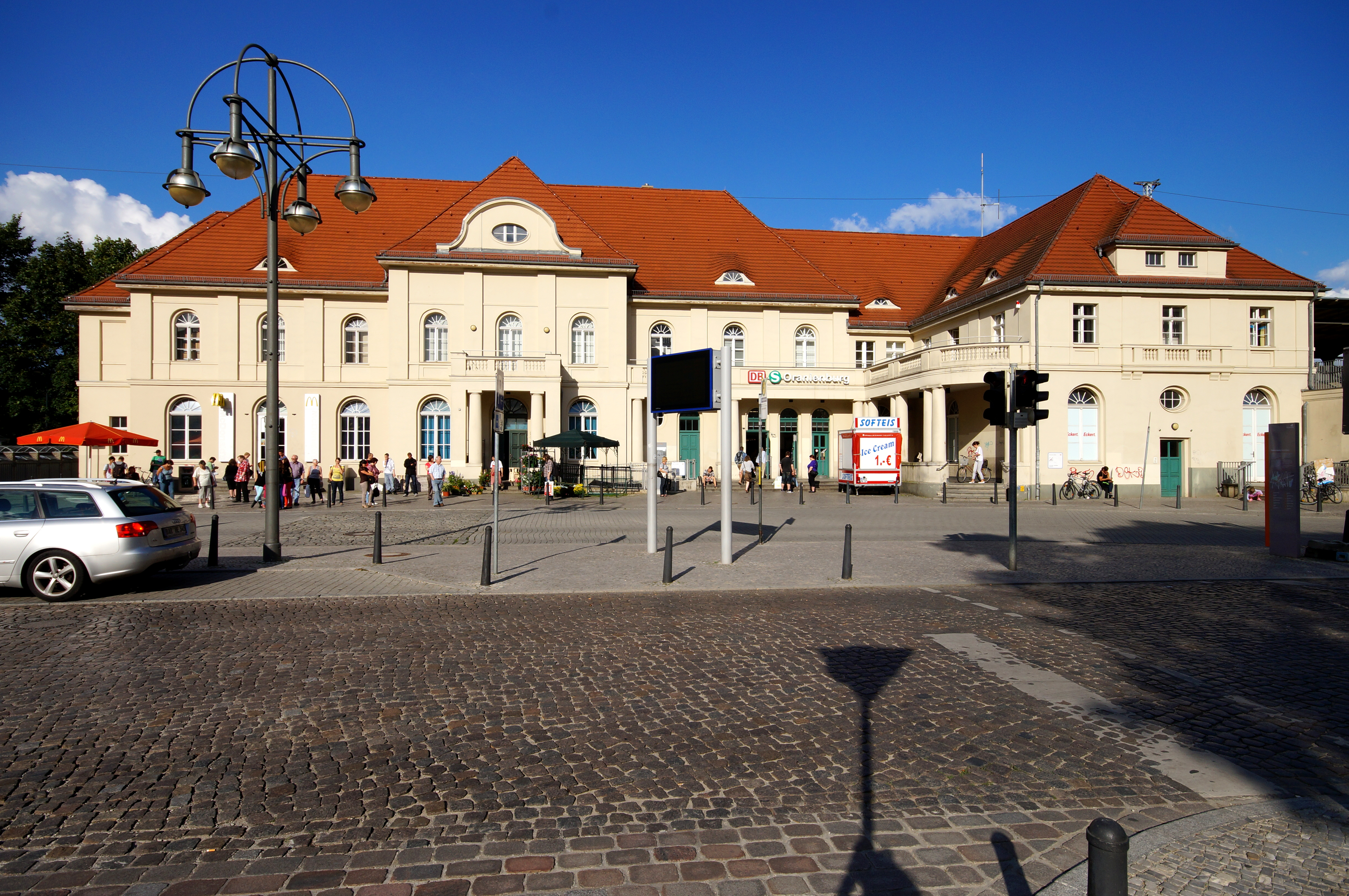
- Schloss Oranienburg St. Nicolai Kirche Oranienburg station

- Coat of arms

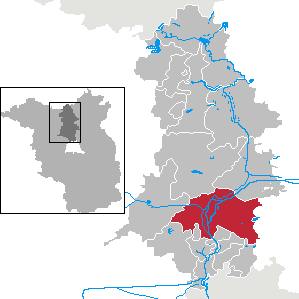
- Location of Oranienburg within Oberhavel district
- Interactive map of Oranienburg
- Location within Germany Location within Brandenburg
- Coordinates: 52°45′16″N 13°14′13″E
- Country: Germany
- State: Brandenburg
- District: Oberhavel
- Subdivisions: 9 districts

Government
  - Mayor (2025–33): Jennifer Collin-Feeder (SPD)

Area
  - Total: 163.66 km^{2} (63.19 sq mi)
- Elevation: 34 m (112 ft)

Population (2025-12-31)
  - Total: 49,824
  - Density: 304.44/km^{2} (788.49/sq mi)
- Time zone: UTC+01:00 (CET)
  - Summer (DST): UTC+02:00 (CEST)
- Postal codes: 16515
- Dialling codes: 03301
- Vehicle registration: OHV
- Website: www.oranienburg.de

Oranienburg (German: [oˈʁaːniənˌbʊʁk]) is a town in Brandenburg, Germany. It is the capital of the district of Oberhavel.

== Geography ==
Oranienburg is on the banks of the River Havel, 35 km north of the centre of Berlin.

=== Division of the town ===
Oranienburg consists of nine districts:

- Friedrichsthal
- Germendorf
- Lehnitz
- Malz
- Oranienburg
- Sachsenhausen
- Schmachtenhagen
- Wensickendorf
- Zehlendorf

== History ==
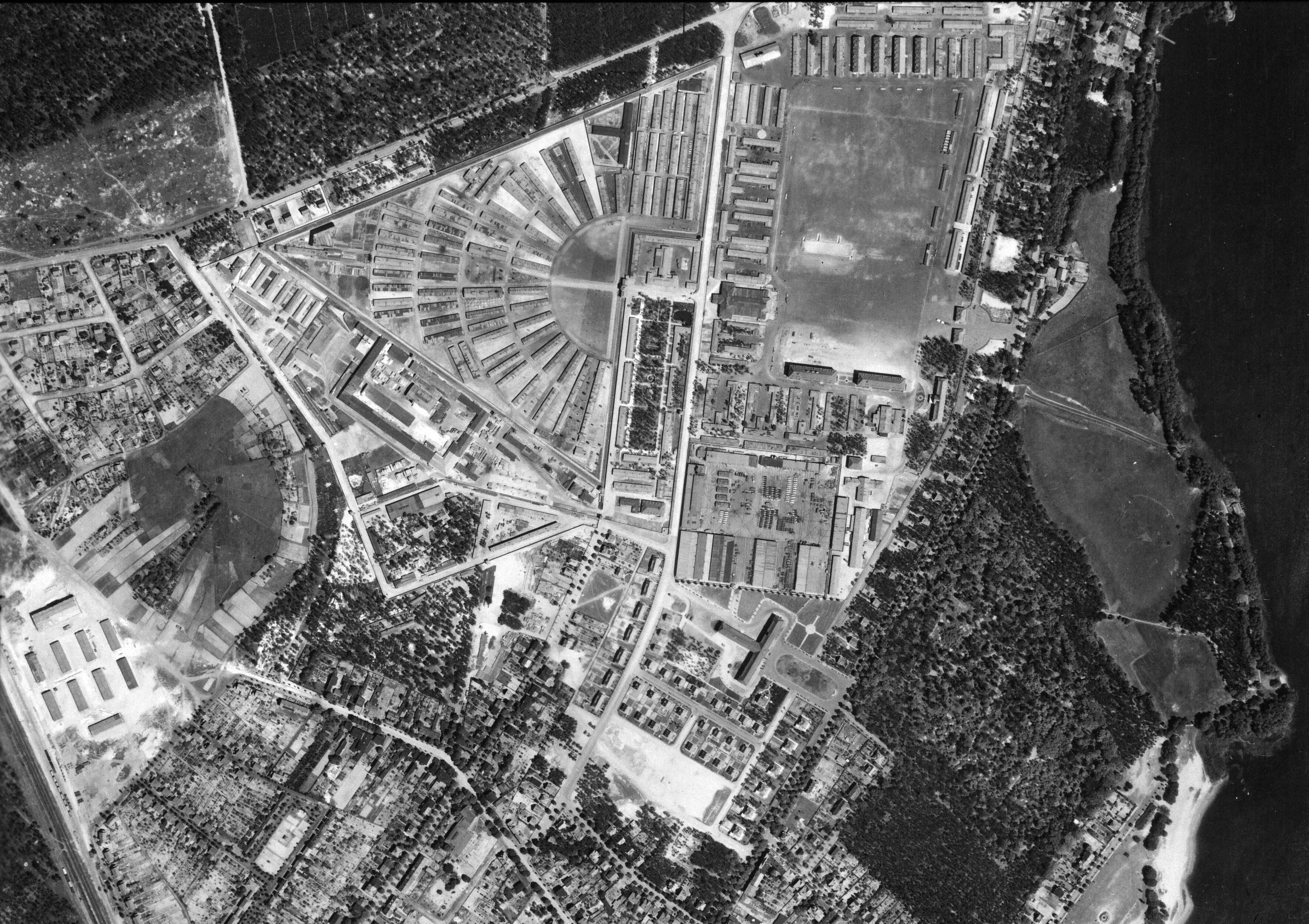
Sachsenhausen concentration camp

Originally named Bötzow, the town of Oranienburg dates from the 12th century and was first mentioned in 1216. Margrave Albert the Bear (ruled 1157–1170) allegedly ordered the construction of a castle on the banks of the Havel. Around the castle stood a settlement of traders and craftsmen.

In 1646, Friedrich Wilhelm I of Brandenburg married Louise Henriette of Orange-Nassau (German: Oranien-Nassau). She was so attracted by the town of Bötzow that her husband presented the entire region to her. The princess ordered the construction of a new castle in the Dutch style and called it Oranienburg or Schloss Oranienburg. In 1653 the town of Bötzow was renamed Oranienburg.

Silvio Gesell, the founder of Freiwirtschaft ("free economy"), lived in Oranienburg between 1911 and 1915, publishing his magazine, Der Physiocrat. He returned to the town in 1927 and lived there until his death in 1930. The town remained a center of the "free economy" movement until the Nazi régime outlawed it in 1933, and many of Gesell's followers ended up as prisoners in the town's concentration camp.

The Oranienburg concentration camp (established in March 1933) was among the earliest of the Nazis concentration camps. In 1936, the Sachsenhausen concentration camp on the outskirts of Oranienburg replaced it; there 200,000 people were interned over the nine years that the Nazis operated it. Approximately 22,000 people died at the camp before the liberation of the camp by the Soviet Red Army in 1945. Thereafter the site reopened in August 1945 as "Soviet Special Camp 7". A further 12,000 people (mostly Nazis not awaiting trial) died under the Soviets before the Special Camp closed in 1950. Their remains were not discovered until the 1990s.

Oranienburg became the center of Nazi Germany's nuclear-energy project because it was the location of the Auergesellschaft Oranienburg Plant, Germany's uranium production facility; the town also had an armaments hub, aircraft plant, and railway junction, all of military importance. According to military historian Antony Beevor, Stalin's desire to acquire the nuclear facility motivated him to launch the Battle for Berlin of April–May 1945. It has been claimed that the pre-emptive destruction of these nuclear facilities by the USAAF Eighth Air Force on 15 March 1945 aimed to prevent them from falling into Soviet hands.

On 23 April 1945, during the Battle of Berlin, troops of the 1st Belorussian Front of the Red Army captured Oranienburg.

Between 1949 and 1990, Oranienburg was part of the German Democratic Republic (East Germany).

Due to its heavy bombing, Oranienburg is the "most dangerous town in Germany"; it is the only town in Germany which pursues a systematic search for unexploded ordnance (UXO) based on postwar aerial photos and magnetic or radar underground measurements for metal. By 2017 about 200 had been disposed of, and 350 to 400 were estimated to remain. It is estimated that the search and disposal will continue throughout the rest of the century. In one case 12,000 residents had to be evacuated. The federal government does not finance the removal of foreign UXO.

== Public institutions ==
The Zehlendorf transmission facility, a large facility for radio broadcasting in longwave, medium wave and FM-range, was located near Oranienburg, at Zehlendorf.

== Transport ==
The town is served by the Berlin Northern Railway and provide a direct connection to Rostock.

== Demography ==
Development of population since 1875 within the current boundaries (blue line: population; dotted line: comparison to population development of Brandenburg state; grey background: time of Nazi rule; red background: time of communist rule)

Recent population development and projections (population pevelopment before 2011 census (blue line); recent population development according to the census in Germany in 2011 (blue bordered line); official projections for 2005–2030 (yellow line); for 2020–2030 (green line); for 2017–2030 (scarlet line)

Oranienburg: Population development
within the current boundaries (2020)

Year	Pop.	±% p.a.
1875	9,514	—
1890	11,568	+1.31%
1910	20,179	+2.82%
1925	23,656	+1.07%
1933	27,043	+1.69%
1939	42,982	+8.03%
1946	31,893	−4.17%
1950	32,781	+0.69%
1964	33,379	+0.13%
1971	33,426	+0.02%
1981	35,433	+0.58%
1985	37,234	+1.25%
1989	37,544	+0.21%
1990	37,113	−1.15%
1991	36,909	−0.55%

Year	Pop.	±% p.a.
1992	36,777	−0.36%
1993	36,885	+0.29%
1994	37,138	+0.69%
1995	37,577	+1.18%
1996	38,151	+1.53%
1997	39,001	+2.23%
1998	39,541	+1.38%
1999	39,949	+1.03%
2000	40,148	+0.50%
2001	40,403	+0.64%
2002	40,378	−0.06%
2003	40,593	+0.53%
2004	41,055	+1.14%
2005	41,115	+0.15%
2006	41,267	+0.37%

Year	Pop.	±% p.a.
2007	41,488	+0.54%
2008	41,577	+0.21%
2009	41,590	+0.03%
2010	41,810	+0.53%
2011	41,370	−1.05%
2012	41,621	+0.61%
2013	42,028	+0.98%
2014	42,894	+2.06%
2015	43,526	+1.47%
2016	44,079	+1.27%
2017	43,982	−0.22%
2018	44,512	+1.21%
2019	44,862	+0.79%
2020	45,492	+1.40%

== Twin towns – sister cities ==
Oranienburg is twinned with:

- Bagnolet, France (1964)
- Hamm, Germany (1990)
- Mělník, Czech Republic (1974)
- Vught, Netherlands (2000)
- Kfar Yona, Israel (2021)

== Notable people ==
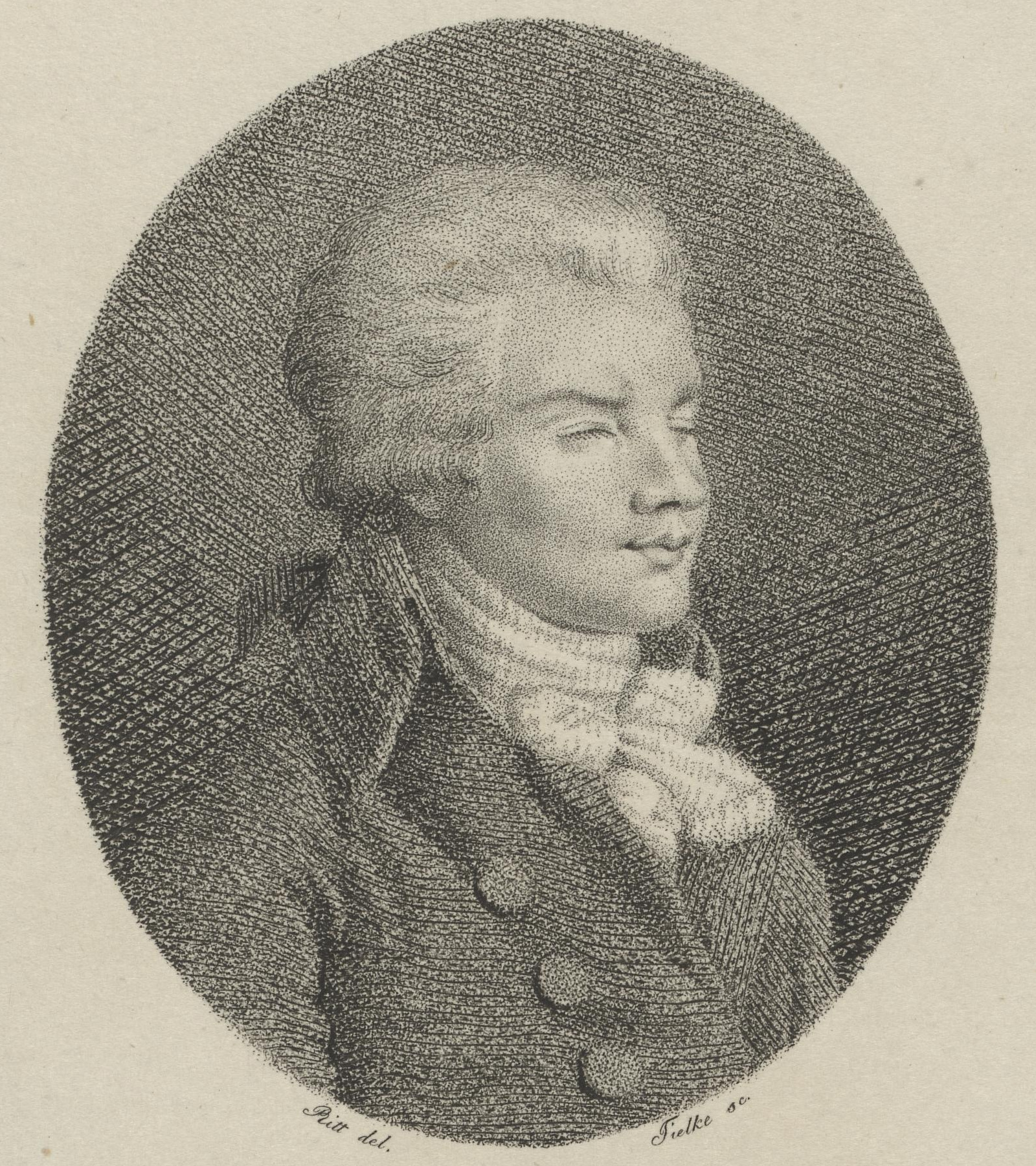
Friedrich Ludwig Dulon

- Friedrich Ludwig Dulon (1769–1826), flautist and composer
- Walther Bothe (1891–1957), physicist and Nobel laureate
- Carl Gustav Hempel (1905–1997), philosopher
- W. Michael Blumenthal (born 1926), business leader, economist and political adviser
- Bernd Eichwurzel (born 1964), rower, Olympic champion
- Alexander Walke (born 1983), footballer
- Marcus Mlynikowski (born 1992), footballer
- Silvio Gesell, lived between 1911 and 1915 and between 1927 and his death in 1930

== See also ==
- Oranienburg railway station
- Stellwerk Fichtengrund
