= Central German Lignite Mining District =

Mining region in Germany

Central German Lignite Mining District Mitteldeutsches Braunkohlerevier
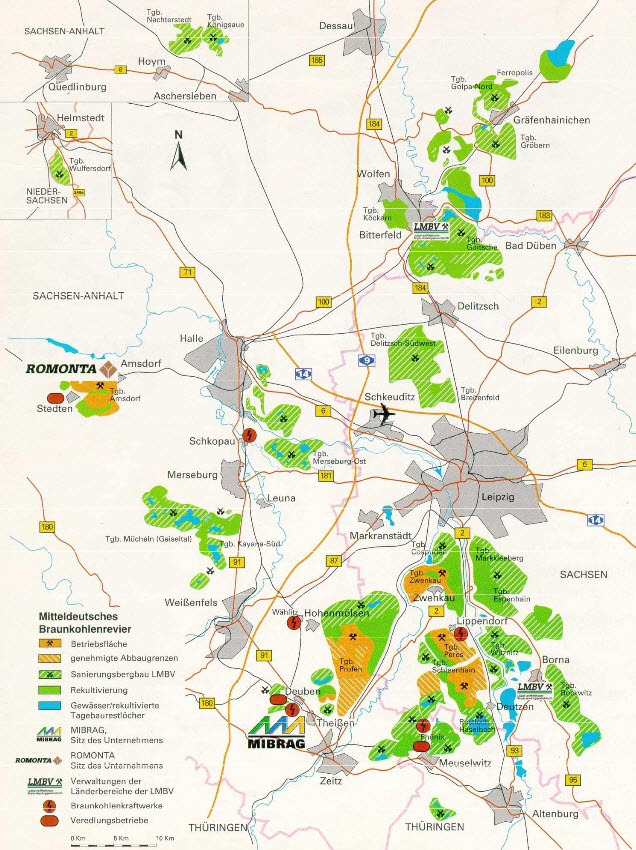
- Country: Germany
- States: Saxony-Anhalt, Saxony, Thuringia

The Central German Lignite Mining District (German: Mitteldeutsches Braunkohlerevier), often simply referred to as the Central German Mining District, is a mining region in Central Germany. Historically, the boundaries of this region vary depending on context and scientific discipline. Since German reunification, the Central German Lignite Mining District is generally considered to encompass parts of Saxony-Anhalt, the northwestern region of Saxony, and the easternmost part of Thuringia.

Lignite mining has significantly altered the landscape of the region, leaving behind numerous environmental legacies. Today, it is one of the largest land rehabilitation areas in Europe. While former open-pit mines are being reclaimed, active lignite extraction continues in the Amsdorf, Profen, and Vereinigtes Schleenhain Open-Pit Mines. Over 53,000 people have been displaced due to mining activities in the district.

== Former mining areas ==
Until the early 20th century, lignite played a minor role in Germany's energy sector, with hard coal being the dominant fuel source. However, after World War I, the Treaty of Versailles forced Germany to cede territories containing about 40% of its best hard coal deposits. Additionally, remaining coal mines were subject to heavy reparation payments. As a result, lignite became a crucial energy source for various industries.

Before 1919, lignite was rarely used for electricity generation due to its low calorific value and poor transportability. However, the shortage of coal following territorial losses and the autarky policies of the Weimar Republic led to an increased reliance on lignite, which by the 1920s accounted for nearly 60% of Germany's energy production.

This period saw a rapid increase in lignite production across Germany, making the country both the largest producer and consumer of lignite worldwide. By 1945, Germany's lignite industry was divided into three major districts: the Central German Mining District, the East Elbian Mining District, and the Rhenish Lignite Mining District.

The Central German District supplied approximately 40% of Germany's lignite before World War II, while the East Elbian and Rhenish districts each contributed around 25%. The East Elbian Mining District, now known as the Lusatian Lake District, included areas in Lusatia and Lower Silesia.

The Central German Mining District's primary lignite consumers were the chemical industry, power plants, potash mining, and sugar production. Before the war, 61% of mined lignite was used for industrial applications, while 39% was used for domestic heating.

== Quality and challenges ==
Despite its abundance, Central German lignite has disadvantages compared to other regions:

- High water content – averaging 50%, reducing its calorific value.
- Difficult extraction – requiring removal of thick layers of quartzite and overburden.
- High sulfur content – leading to higher costs for flue gas desulfurization in power plants.

== Formation of the Central German Lignite Syndicate ==
The Central German Lignite Syndicate (Mitteldeutsches Braunkohlen-Syndikat) was established in 1909, officially defining the mining district. The syndicate, based in Leipzig, coordinated sales and production across nine mining regions, including Halle, Bitterfeld, Merseburg, Borna, and Zeitz.

In 1946, the Soviet Military Administration in Germany (SMAD) dissolved the syndicate, and lignite operations were nationalized into state-owned combines under the German Democratic Republic (East Germany). The term Central German Lignite Mining District fell out of official use in East Germany but continued to be used in West Germany.

== Current boundaries ==
Today, the Central German Lignite Mining District comprises the active Profen and Vereinigtes Schleenhain open-pit mines. The mining areas are categorized into North, South, and West sectors, based on their proximity to the Mulde River, Saale River, and White Elster River.

The mining district falls under the regulatory authority of the following agencies:

- Saxony-Anhalt: State Office for Geology and Mining in Halle (Saale).
- Saxony: Saxon Supreme Mining Authority in Freiberg.
- Thuringia: Thuringian State Office for Environment, Mining, and Nature Conservation in Erfurt.

== Ongoing mining and transition ==
Mining continues in the district, with an annual extraction of 17.7 million tons as of 2018. However, the number of direct mining jobs has dropped to 2,396. Since 1990, over 48,000 hectares of land have been affected by mining, displacing over 51,000 residents.

The two major operators in the region today are:

- Romonta – operating the Amsdorf Open-Pit Mine, extracting bitumen-rich lignite for montan wax production.
- MIBRAG – operating the Profen and Vereinigtes Schleenhain open-pit mines.

== Environmental remediation ==
Since 1990, the LMBV (Lausitz and Central German Mining Administration Company) has been responsible for land rehabilitation. Former mining areas are being converted into lakes, forests, and agricultural land.

== See also ==
- Middle German Chemical Triangle
- List of displaced villages due to mining
