= Zehlendorf bei Oranienburg =

Coordinates: 52°48′N 13°24′E

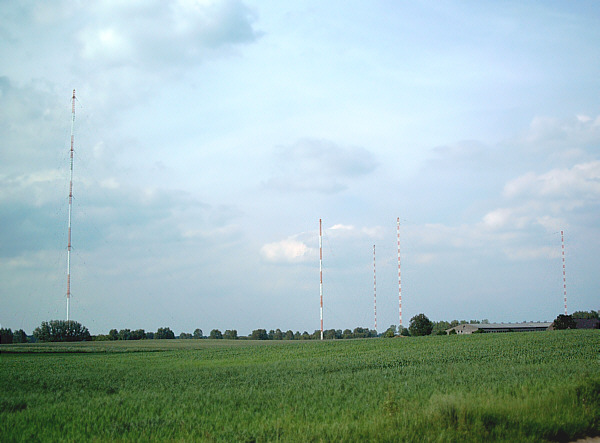
The 5 transmitting towers of Zehlendorf; the towers have since been demolished, with the last tower demolished in 2017.

Zehlendorf (German: Zehlendorf bei Oranienburg) is a village belonging to the city of Oranienburg in Brandenburg. It was incorporated into Oranienburg on 26 October 2003.

The village was home to the Sender Zehlendorf, a transmitter for long wave and medium wave radio. It was completed in 1962.

== History ==
In 1335 the first documents mention the area as Zedelndorp. In 1412 the area was called Goetze after the family name of the owners. After Louise Henriette had acquired the land 1651 she leased the area of Zehlendorf to the town of Oranienburg. A hundred and twenty-four years later, in 1775, Zehlendorf became a town in its own right. In 1819 the Prussian state leased Zehlendorf to Ernst Friedrich William Kienitz, the mayor of the town of Friedrichsthal. In 1826 Zehlendorf was freed from the lease. In 1901 a railway station, Heidekrautbahn, was opened, which led from Berlin to Liebenwalde. In 1927 the property was sold to the German Society for Internal Colonization, the headquarters of which were in Berlin. This sale was part of a settlement with the local farmers, who had lost land due to the mining of clay and metal in order to supply Germania-Klinkerwerk. The property was also used as the working premises of the concentration camp of Sachsenhausen until 1945. In 1998 the western branch railways were shut down and the stations were closed, including the one at Zehlendorf. In 2003 Zehlendorf was incorporated into Oranienburg.
