= Sender Zehlendorf =

German radio facility

Coordinates: 52°47′41.8″N 13°23′9.5″E

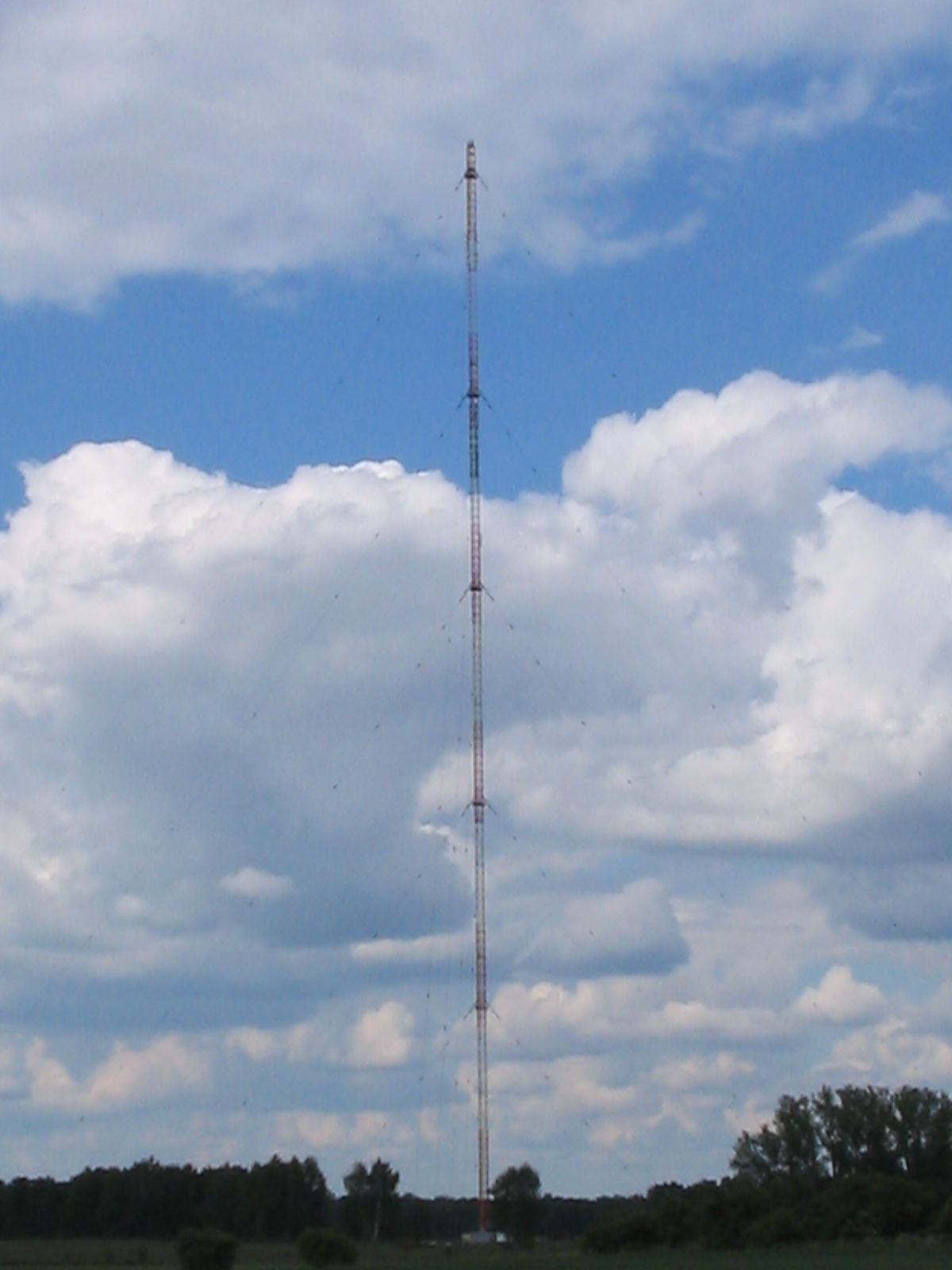
One of the Antennas of the Sender Zehlendorf

Sender Zehlendorf or Zehlendorf (radio) transmission facility was a radio transmission facility which was in service since 1936, when a short wave transmitter was built on the occasion of the Berlin 1936 Summer Olympics in Zehlendorf (a village near Oranienburg) as part of the establishment of permanent radio services. This Zehlendorf site, which until the end of World War II was referred to as the Rehmate Radio Transmission Centre (German: Funksendestelle Rehmate), had 26 different antennas at the time (that is, before and at the end of World War II).

In 2017 the last antenna at the site was demolished by controlled implosion, ending the era of the transmission towers in Zehlendorf.

== History ==
In 1945, most of the Rehmate Radio Transmission Centre was dismantled by the Soviet occupying forces as reparation, who left only three wooden radio masts. Two of these wooden masts supplied the building material for a 100-metre-tall transmission tower built at Golm in 1948, which was used until 1979.

In 1952 it was decided to build at the location of the former radio transmission center Rehmate the central long wave transmitter of the GDR. For this between 1956 and 1958 a triangle plane aerial, which was hung up on three 150 metres high guyed masts of lattice steel, which were insulated against ground, was built. A second transmitting antenna, which would become the main antenna, was built between 1960 and 1962. It consisted of a 351-metre-high (1,152 ft), lattice steel framework mast, at which a conical cage aerial was mounted, making it the tallest structure in Europe between 1962 and 1964. With this antenna a transmitting power of 750 kilowatts in the long-wave range on a frequency, which was reduced in course of the time gradually for the reduction by interference from 185 kHz to 177 kHz, was possible. The maximum transmitting power, which was possible over the triangle plane aerial, was 500 kilowatts.

On 18 May 1978 the main mast collapsed after being struck by a Russian MiG-21 aircraft. After the cause of the collapse was certain, the Soviet Union promised to supply and construct a new mast. In order not to stop the progress of the construction work by the stricter German safety regulations, for the duration of the construction work the area in the radius of 300 metres was declared a Soviet exclave. In August 1979 the new mast with a height of 359.7 metres was finished.

In 1990 the plant was taken over by the Deutsche Telekom AG. At first it was planned to shut down the facility: so the cage aerial at the 359.7-metre-high (1,180 ft) main mast was dismantled and the transmitting power of the long wave transmitter was reduced occasionally to 100 kilowatts. In the second half of the 1990s a reorientation occurred. The long wave transmitter was modernised and the main antenna tower received a new cage aerial. Also the transmitting power of the long wave transmitter was increased again to 500 kW. In the year 2000 a 129-metre-high (423 ft), guyed, grounded mast of lattice steel carrying a cage aerial for medium wave was built. This took over the function of the former Transmitter Berlin-Koepenick and served apart from the spreading of the program of MEGARADIO also for transmitting of programs of the Voice of Russia, partly in the Simulcast mode.

The long wave transmitter changed over on 29 August 2005 as first German large transmitter to Digital Radio Mondiale. The long wave transmitter ceased operation on December 31, 2014 as part of the general shutdown in Germany of AM radio services to the public. The mast continued to support VHF radio antennas providing FM broadcast services.

The triangle plane antenna masts (3 of them, 150 meters high each) were demolished in 2007, with the antenna itself having been taken out of service in 2003.

In 2015, the 129-meter mast was demolished; transmission from it had ceased in 2014.

The last mast (the highest, main mast of 359.7 meters height) at the site was demolished in 2017, and radio operations at the site ended.

== See also ==
- List of masts
- List of catastrophic collapses of broadcast masts and towers
