= Beilstein test =

Test for Halides involving heat

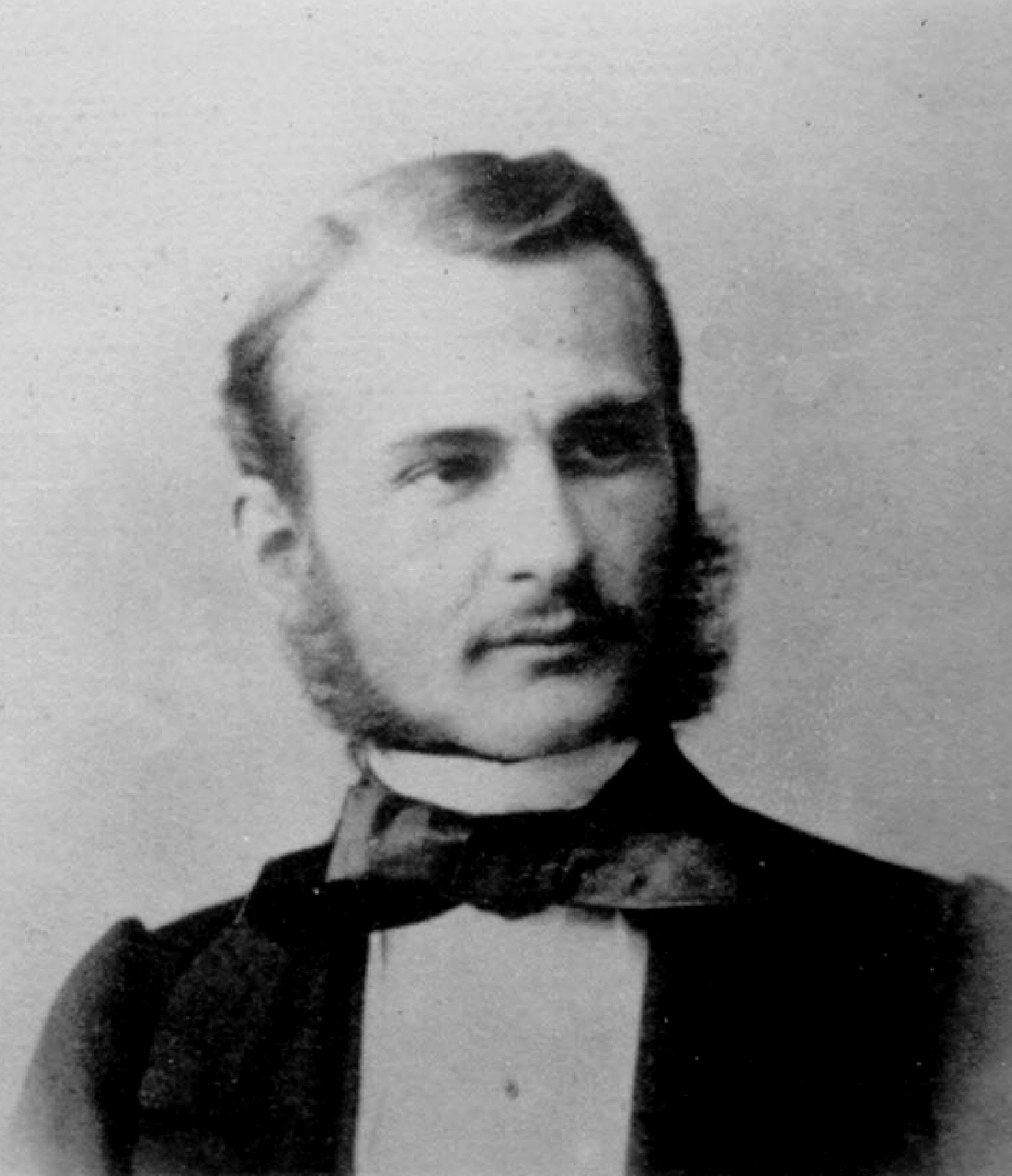
Friedrich Konrad Beilstein

The Beilstein test is a simple qualitative chemical test for organic halides. It was developed by Friedrich Konrad Beilstein.

A copper wire is cleaned and heated in a Bunsen burner flame to form a coating of copper(II) oxide. It is then dipped in the sample to be tested and once again heated in a flame. A positive test is indicated by a green flame caused by the formation of a copper halide. The test does not detect fluorine/fluorides.

This test is no longer frequently used. One reason why it is not widely used is that it is possible to generate the highly toxic chloro-dioxins if the test material is a polychloroarene.

An alternative wet test for halide is the sodium fusion test — this test converts organic material to inorganic salts include the sodium halide. Addition of silver nitrate solution causes any halides to precipitate as the respective silver halide.
