= Beilstein Journal of Nanotechnology =

- Discipline: Nanotechnology
- Language: English
- Edited by: Gerhard Wilde

Publication details
- History: 2010–present
- Publisher: Beilstein Institute for the Advancement of Chemical Sciences (Germany)
- Frequency: Continuous
- Open access: Yes
- License: Creative Commons Attribution-NoDerivatives
- Impact factor: 2.9 (2023)

Standard abbreviations
- ISO 4: Beilstein J. Nanotechnol.

Indexing
- CODEN: BJNEAH
- ISSN: 2190-4286
- OCLC no.: 967839311

Links
- Journal homepage; Online archive

The Beilstein Journal of Nanotechnology is a peer-reviewed platinum open-access scientific journal covering all aspects of nanoscience and nanotechnology. It is published by the Beilstein Institute for the Advancement of Chemical Sciences and the editor-in-chief is Gerhard Wilde (University of Münster). The journal was established in 2010. It is a member of the Free Journal Network.

== Abstracting and indexing ==
The journal is abstracted and indexed in:

- Chemical Abstracts Service
- Current Contents/Physical, Chemical & Earth Sciences
- Ei Compendex
- Science Citation Index Expanded
- Scopus

According to the Journal Citation Reports, the journal has a 2023 impact factor of 2.9.
