= Luch (landform) =

Glaciation-resultant rolling marshland or bogs in the Central European Plain

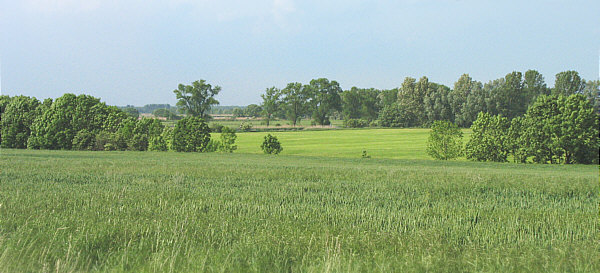
View of the Rhinluch from Ländchen Bellin

The term Luch (plural: Luche) is German and refers to an area of originally expansive, marshy or boggy lowland in northeast Germany, especially in the state of Brandenburg. Luche are found mainly in Young Drift regions; but they also occur on Old Drift landscapes. According to Leser the term should not be translated.

== Location and history ==
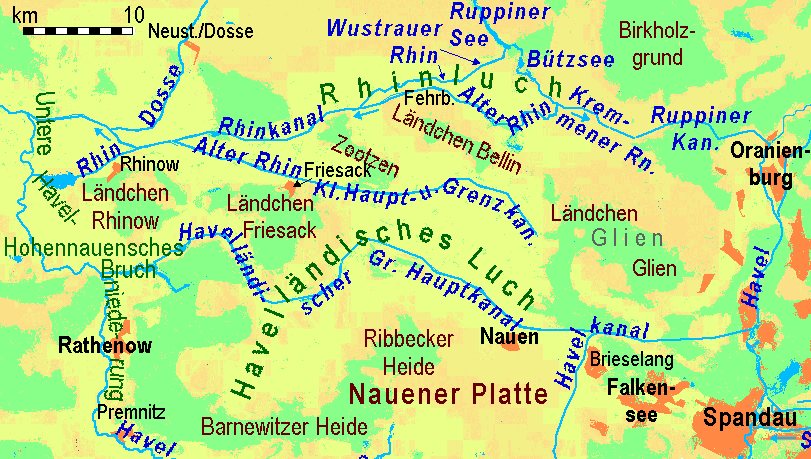
The Havelland Luch and Rhinluch: uplands: yellow-green< 40 m to brown > 45 m, woods = green irrespective of height

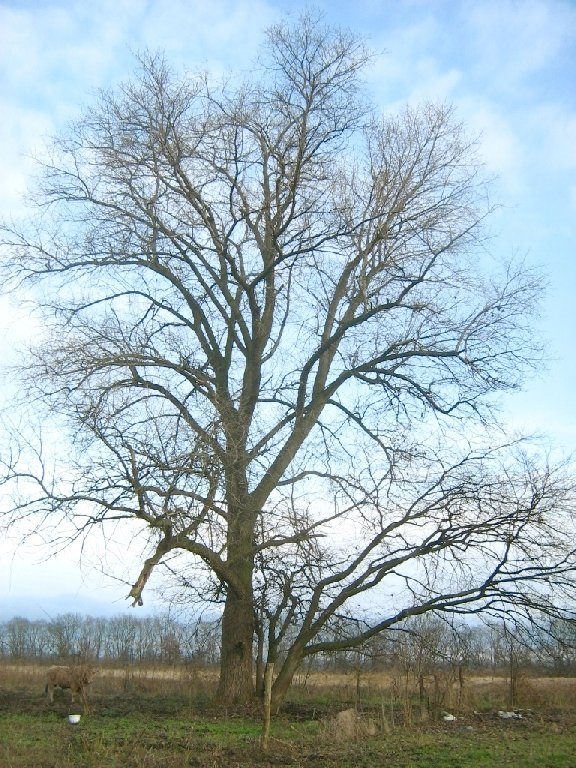
Black poplars in the Havelland Luch

Luche mainly formed in the main urstromtal valleys or their side valleys. After the end of the Ice Age, the water table rose during the postglacial period resulting in the formation of bogs. The peat thickness is not particularly great; in most cases it is less than 2 metres thick. Before the installation of artificial drainage networks excess water often accumulated in the Luche in ponds. In contrast with lowlands with natural watercourses, they were give a different name from the neighbouring Bruche (carrs), such as the Oderbruch to the east and the Hohennauen Bruch on the Havel to the west.

Most of the Luche in Brandenburg have since been drained by man and have thus become more culturally-associated rather than biospherically outstanding. After alteration of the land, they were commonly used as grassland for grazing. Archaeologists like Klaus Goldmann believe that some of this reclamation began during the Slavic period, but that this was reversed by a worsening of the drainage conditions as a result of the construction of mill dams on the Havel.

There are many Luche in Brandenburg; the largest are however beyond its state borders. Even several placenames are derived from the term Luch. Examples are Luckenwalde and Doberlug.

If the generic term Luch is used, it usually refers to the regions of the Havelland Luch or Rhinluch.

== Examples ==
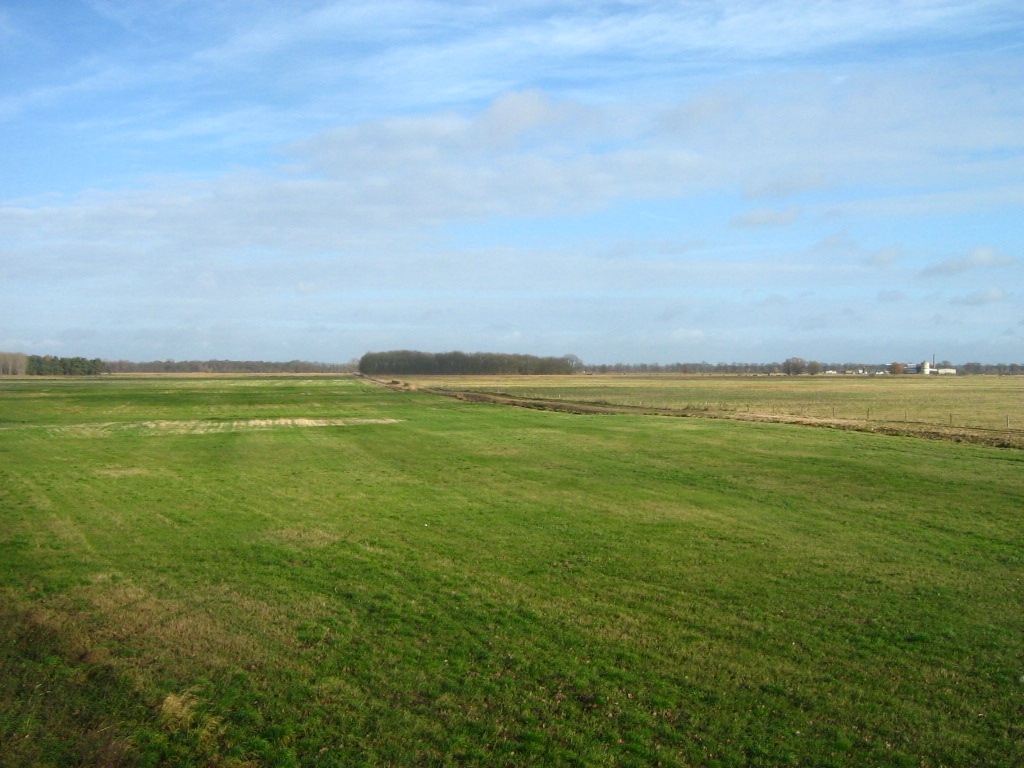
Present-day cultural landscape in the Havelland Luch

– Most of these Luche are parts of larger Luche as shown in the list –

- Golmer Luch
- Havelland Luch
- Rhinluch
  - Kremmener Luch
  - Wustrauer Luch
- Rotes Luch
- Langes Luch
- Luchwiesen
- Alt Zaucher Luch
