= Anke Beilstein =

German politician (born 1966)

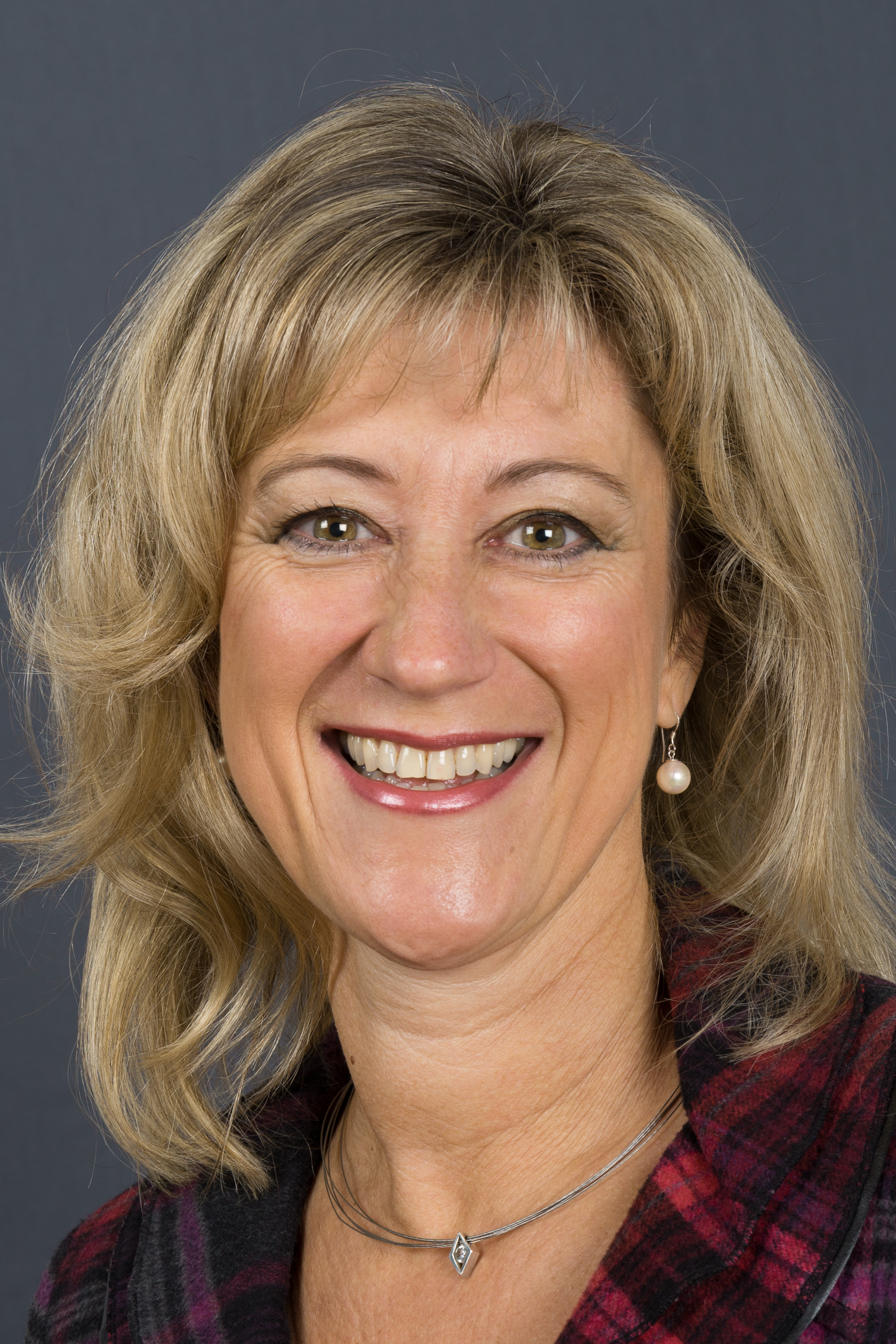
- Beilstein in 2016

Member of the Landtag of Rhineland-Palatinate
- In office 18 May 2006 – 1 November 2023
- Preceded by: Herbert Jullien
- Succeeded by: Jens Münster
- Constituency: Cochem-Zell

Personal details
- Born: 6 June 1966 (age 60) Cochem
- Party: Christian Democratic Union (since 1986)

Anke Beilstein (born 6 June 1966 in Cochem) is a German politician serving as Landrat of Cochem-Zell since 2023. From 2006 to 2023, she was a member of the Landtag of Rhineland-Palatinate. From 2004 to 2014, she served as mayor of Ernst.
