= Golm (Potsdam) =

- Ortsteil of Potsdam
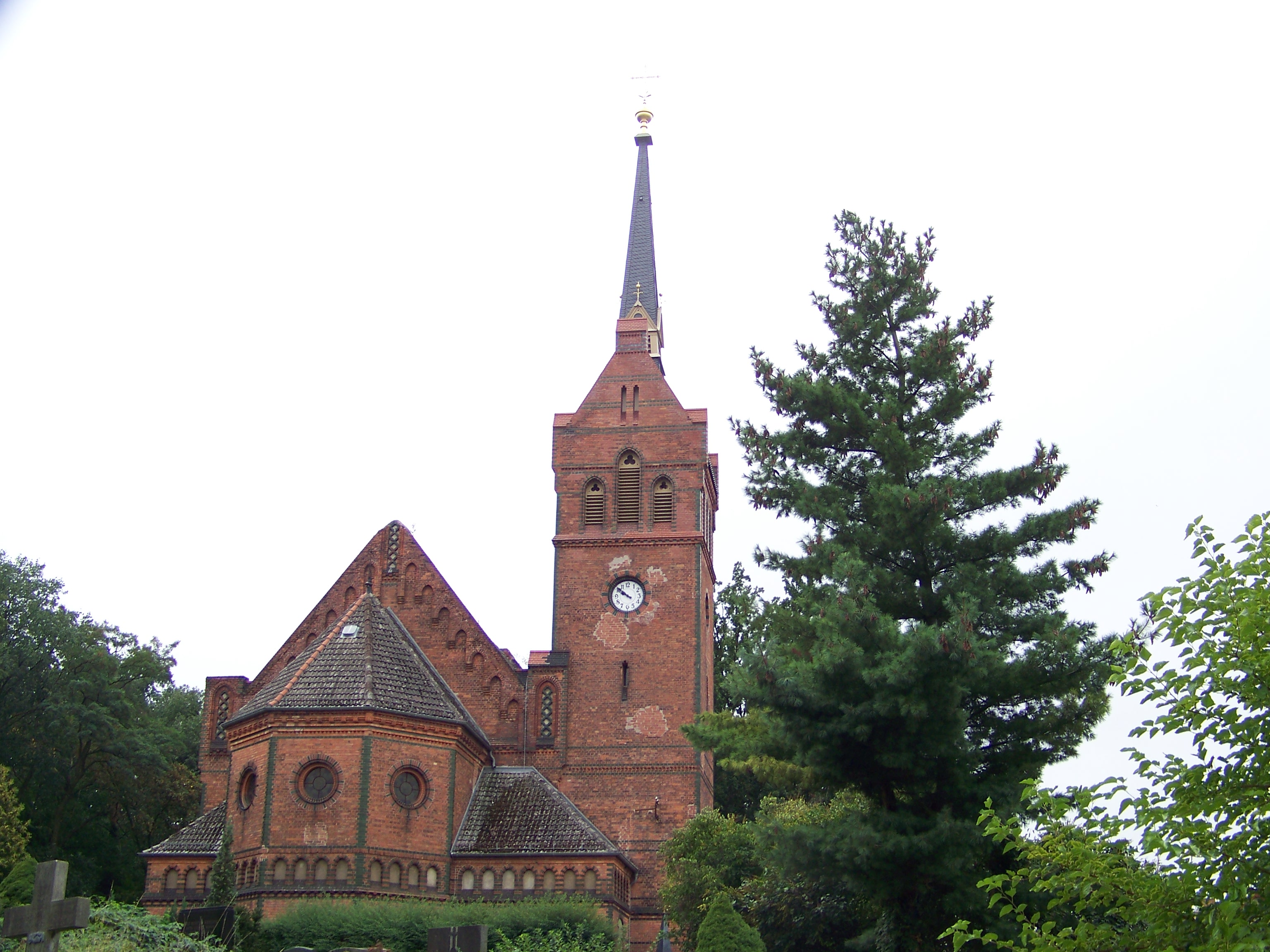
- Village church
- Interactive map of Golm
- Location within Germany Location within Brandenburg
- Coordinates: 52°24′28″N 12°57′45″E
- Country: Germany
- State: Brandenburg
- District: Urban district
- City: Potsdam

Population (2018-12-31)
  - Total: 3,410
- Time zone: UTC+01:00 (CET)
  - Summer (DST): UTC+02:00 (CEST)
- Postal codes: 14476
- Dialling codes: 0331
- Vehicle registration: P

Golm (German pronunciation: [ɡɔlm]) is a locality (Ortsteil) of Potsdam, the capital of the German state of Brandenburg. The former municipality was incorporated in 2003. Its name is derived from Western Slavic chulm, meaning "hill", and refers to one of the nearby elevations, either Reiherberg (68 m (223 ft) a.s.l.) near the centre of the original village or Ehrenpfortenberg (57 m (187 ft) a.s.l.) east of it.

== Geography ==
Neighbouring localities are Grube and Bornim in the north, Eiche in the east (all of which are now parts of Potsdam), and Wildpark West, a part of Geltow in Schwielowsee municipality, in the south. To the west, Golm is bordered by Großer Zernsee, a lake in the course of the river Havel. The settlement of Kuhfort, bordering the Wildpark area of Potsdam, is located southeast of Golm, and east of the grassland of Golmer Luch.

== Buildings and structures ==
Golm houses, among other things, since 1991 a complex of the University of Potsdam on the premises of former Luftwaffe and Reichsarbeitsdienst barracks, which after World War II became the site of a Stasi academy. Academic institutions of the Fraunhofer Society as well as the Max Planck Institute for Gravitational Physics are attached ("Potsdam Science Park").

From 1948 to 1993 Golm was the site of a medium wave broadcast transmitter.

== Transport ==
There are no major roads through Golm, only state road (Landesstraße) L 902 passes through the northern parts of the village area and offers the shortest connection to federal highway (Bundesstraße) 273. The latter can also be reached following a road extending east from Golm past Sanssouci Park to the Jägervorstadt quarter of Potsdam.

The railway between Wildpark and Nauen was opened in 1902 as part of the single-tracked bypass railway (Umgehungsbahn) intended to connect the radial railway lines originating from Berlin. A station was established in Golm. In the 1950s this line became part of the Berlin outer ring and was double-tracked. Golm is now a passenger station for regional trains to Potsdam, Wustermark, Hennigsdorf, and Berlin Brandenburg Airport.

Golm has also bus connections to Potsdam and Neu Töplitz and is included in fare zone C (Tarifbereich C) of Berlin's public transport system and in fare zone B of Potsdam's public transport system.
