= Friedrich Konrad Beilstein =

Russian chemist (1838–1906)

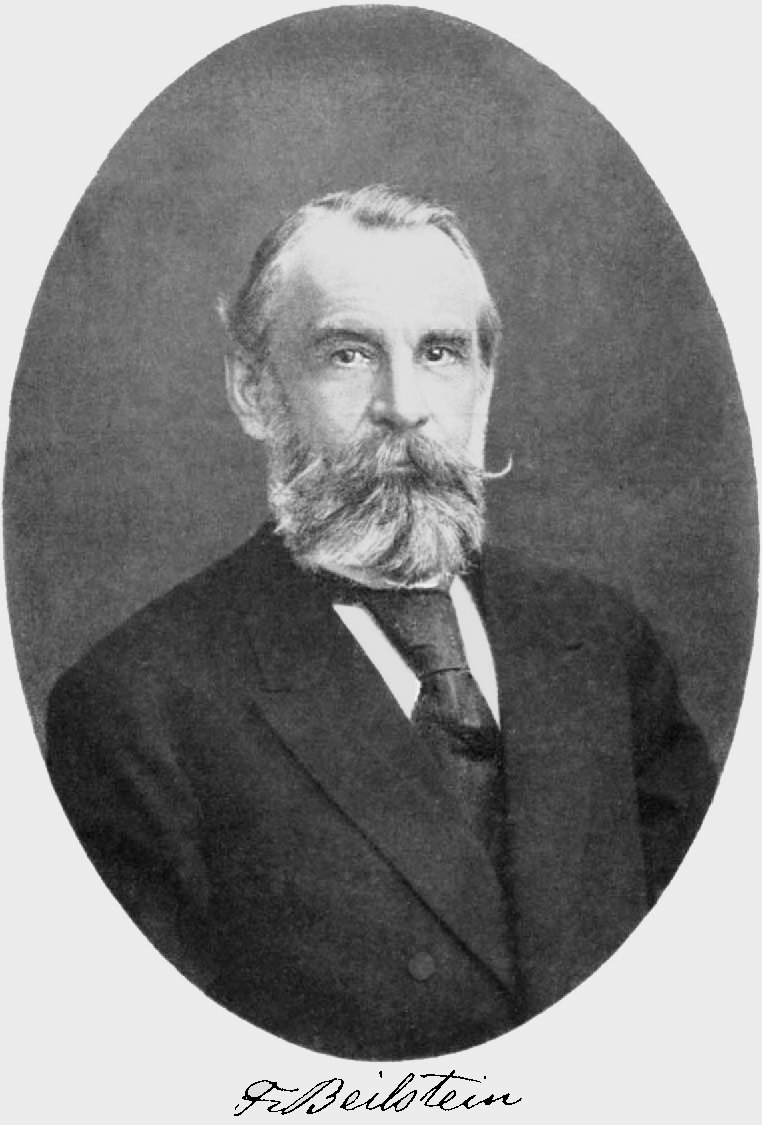
- Born: 17 February 1838; Saint Petersburg, Russian Empire
- Died: 18 October 1906 (aged 68); Saint Petersburg, Russian Empire
- Other name: Фёдор Фёдорович Бейльштейн (Russian)
- Education: Heidelberg University
- Known for: Beilstein database Beilstein test

Friedrich Konrad Beilstein (Russian: Фёдор Фёдорович Бейльштейн; 17 February 1838 – 18 October 1906), was a Russian chemist and founder of the famous Handbuch der organischen Chemie (Handbook of Organic Chemistry). The first edition of this work, published in 1881, covered 1,500 compounds in 2,200 pages. This handbook is now known as the Beilstein database.

== Life ==
Beilstein was born in Saint Petersburg in a family of German descent. Although he mastered the Russian language, he was educated in a German school. At the age of 15, he left for Heidelberg University where he studied chemistry under the tuition of Robert Bunsen. After two years he moved to the Ludwig-Maximilians-Universität München and became a pupil of Justus Liebig, but soon returned to Heidelberg University. There he acquired an interest and preference for organic chemistry, which became his major. For his Ph.D., Beilstein joined Friedrich Wöhler at the University of Göttingen, receiving his doctorate in February 1858, two days before his twentieth birthday. To increase his skill and experience he went to Paris to work with Adolphe Wurtz and Charles Friedel. In autumn of 1859, he accepted an invitation for a post of laboratory assistant at the University of Breslau offered to him by Carl Jacob Löwig, but soon changed it for the University of Göttingen. There, he became Privatdozent and lectured in organic chemistry. In 1865, he received the title of "Professor Extraordinarius" (i.e. assistant professor). In addition, he became editor of the journal the Zeitschrift für anorganische und allgemeine Chemie. His research in that time was focused on the isomerism of the derivatives of the benzene series. In particular, he discovered the relations between chlorotoluene and benzyl chloride.

At the University of Göttingen, Beilstein began to collect systematic notes on organic compounds which finally led to the production of his famous handbook published in Hamburg. The first edition, which Beilstein compiled single-handedly, appeared in 1881–83 in two volumes, and was rapidly exhausted. The second edition began to appear in 1886 and filled three volumes of larger size than the first. The third edition was commenced in 1893, and its four volumes became unwieldy. It was finished in 1900, and has been supplemented by four large volumes of additions edited by the German Chemical Society, which became the proprietor of the handbook. S.R Heller. The Beilstein Online Database An Introduction. The Beilstein Online Database ACS Symposium Series; American Chemical Society: Washington, DC, 1990.

In 1866, Beilstein returned to St. Petersburg where he became professor of chemistry at the Imperial Technological Institute. There he continued his research on isomerism of the aromatic series. In 1881, Beilstein became a member of the Russian Academy of Sciences, a position associated with a good income, a private dwelling and a laboratory. Leicester points out that Beilstein favoured the election of Dmitri Mendeleev, but Mendeleev's candidacy never succeeded. Shortly after his election Beilstein left professorship for research, the compilation of his handbook and his favourite hobby, music. He was also very fond of travelling and spent several months each year in Europe. Beilstein remained a bachelor all his life, but adopted a daughter who was his companion in later years. He died suddenly, of apoplectic attack in 1906.
