= Max Planck Institute of Colloids and Interfaces =

German research institute

Coordinates: 52°24′54″N 12°58′8″E

- Abbreviation: MPIKG
- Formation: 1990; 36 years ago
- Type: Scientific institute
- Purpose: Research in colloids and interfaces
- Headquarters: Golm, Potsdam, Brandenburg, Germany
- Key people: Markus Antonietti (co-founder); Reinhard Lipowski (co-founder); Helmuth Möhwald (co-founder)
- Parent organization: Max Planck Society
- Website: Homepage (in English)

The Max Planck Institute of Colloids and Interfaces (German: Max-Planck-Institut für Kolloid- und Grenzflächenforschung) is located in Potsdam-Golm Science Park in Golm, Potsdam, Germany. It was founded in 1990 as a successor of the Institute for Physical Chemistry and for Organic Chemistry, both in Berlin-Adlershof, and for Polymer Chemistry in Teltow. In 1999, it transferred to newly constructed extension facilities in Golm. It is one of 80 institutes in the Max Planck Society (Max-Planck-Gesellschaft).

== Research ==
Being part of the Max Planck Society, the institute examines nano- and microstructures specifically colloids in which many are found in nature. With discoveries, scientists create tiny apatite crystals in bones, vesicles formed out of membranes, pores in membranes for fuel cells and microcapsules as vehicles for medical drugs - all are larger than an atom, yet too small to be seen with the naked eye. The scientists at the Potsdam-based Institute endeavor to understand how they are composed and how they work in order to imitate behavior in new materials or in vaccines, for example. Understanding the function of these structures can also help to identify the causes of certain diseases that occur when the folding of membranes or the transport of materials in cells fails to work properly.

== Departments ==
=== Colloid Chemistry ===
The Colloid Chemistry department, headed by Markus Antonietti, deals with the synthesis of various colloidal structures in the nanometer range. This includes inorganic and metallic nanoparticles, polymers and peptide structural units, their micelles and organised phases, as well as emulsions and foams. Colloid chemistry is able to create materials with a structural hierarchy through appropriate functionalized colloids. This creates new characteristics through the "teamwork" of the functional groups. With appropriate architecture, these colloids can fulfill very specialized tasks. Single molecular systems cannot do this, due to their lack of complexity. An example for this is skin: There is no synthetic material which is as soft and simultaneously so tear-resistant and yet is made mainly of water. The secret of this also lies in the interaction between three components (collagen, hyaluronic acid, proteoglycan). This unusual combination of characteristics is only made possible by forming a superstructure "in a team".

=== Biomaterials ===
The Department of Biomaterials, headed by Peter Fratzl, focuses on interdisciplinary research in the field of biological and biomimetic materials. The emphasis is on understanding how the mechanical or other physical properties are governed by structure and composition and how they adopt to environmental conditions. Furthermore, research on natural materials (such as bone or wood) has potential applications in many fields. First, design concepts for new materials may be improved by learning from Nature. Second, the understanding of basic mechanisms by which the structure of bone or connective tissue is optimized opens the way for studying diseases and, thus, for contributing to diagnosis and development of treatment strategies. A third option is to use structures grown by Nature and transform them by physical or chemical treatment into technically relevant materials (biotemplating). Given the complexity of natural materials, new approaches for structural characterization are needed. Some of these are further developed in the Department, in particular for studying hierarchical structures.

=== Theory and Bio-Systems ===
The Department of Theory and Bio-Systems, headed by Reinhard Lipowsky, investigates the structure and dynamics of molecules, colloids and nanoparticles in biological and biomimetic systems. The molecular building blocks of these systems assemble "by themselves" and form a variety of supramolecular nanostructures, which then interact to produce even larger structures and networks. These complex processes represent hidden dimensions of selforganization since they are difficult to observe on the relevant length and time scales.

Current research focuses on molecular recognition, energy conversion and transport by molecular motors, dynamics of transcription and translation, as well as self-organization of filaments and membranes.

=== Interfaces ===
The Department of Interfaces, headed by Helmuth Möhwald, is primarily motivated to understand molecular interfaces and to relate this to colloidal systems which are by nature determined by the large surface/volume ratio. Consequently, the strength of the department in characterizing planar or quasi-planar interfaces has been increased and in addition it has been tried successfully to transfer this knowledge to curved interfaces. From this we have again learned about planar interfaces since surfaces could be studied by techniques requiring large surface area (NMR, DSC).

=== Biomolecular Systems ===
The researchers in the Biomolecular Systems department, headed by Peter H. Seeberger, are using new methods for synthesizing sugar chains. Until recently most of the known naturally occurring sugars were those that supply energy to organisms such as sucrose (household sugar) and starch (in plants). However, the complex sugar molecules, which belong to the carbohydrate, are also involved in many biological processes. They cover all cells in the human body and play a crucial part in molecular identification of cell surfaces for example in infections, immune reactions and cancer metastases. Complex sugars are omnipresent as cell coatings in nature and can therefore also be used for vaccine development, e.g. against malaria. Carbohydrates are thus of significant interest for medicine; the major significance of sugar residues on the surfaces of cells for biology and medicine has only been recognized during the past approximately 20 years.

Until recently a chemical synthesis method to create biologically relevant carbohydrates with a known structure in large quantities and for biological, pharmaceutical and medical research was lacking. Now, these gaps can be closed with the development of the first automated synthesis apparatus that can link sugar molecules with other sugars or also molecules.

== Organization ==
The Golm-based institute has a total of 358 employees, including 91 scientists and 99 junior scientists and researchers, 6 apprentices, 138 employees paid with third-party funds and 24 guest researchers. The Institute of Colloids and Interfaces is currently headed by the following people:

Scientific Members, Directors

- Prof. Dr. Markus Antonietti
- Prof. Dr. Peter Fratzl
- Prof. Dr. Reinhard Lipowsky
- Prof. Dr. Peter H. Seeberger

Director Emeritus

- Prof. Dr. Helmuth Möhwald

Administration Manager

- Andreas Stockhaus

Board of Trustees

- Ulrich Buller - Senior Vice President Research Planning, Fraunhofer Gesellschaft
- Rolf Emmermann - Vice-chairman of the Board of Trustees, GeoForschungsZentrum Potsdam (GFZ)
- Detlev Ganten - Chairman of the Board of Trustees, Chairman of the Board of the Charité - Universitätsmedizin Berlin
- Norbert Glante - Member of the European Parliament
- Jann Jakobs - Mayor of the City of Potsdam
- Wilhelm Krull - Secretary General of the Volkswagen Stiftung
- Sabine Kunst - Minister of Science, Research and Culture, Brandenburg
- Wolfgang Plischke - Member of the Bayer AG board
- Robert Seckler - University of Potsdam

== International Max Planck School on Multiscale Bio-Systems ==
The International Max Planck School (IMPRS) on Multiscale Bio-Systems is a graduate program in association with the University of Potsdam, Free University, Humboldt University in Berlin and the Fraunhofer Institute for Biomedical Engineering IBMT in St. Ingbert. In this program, young talented doctoral students can work on a challenging research project and develop their scientific communication and management skills.

=== Scientific scope ===
The IMPRS on Multiscale Bio-Systems addresses the fundamental levels of biosystems as provided by macromolecules in aqueous solutions, molecular recognition between these building blocks, free energy transduction by molecular machines as well as structure formation and transport in cells and tissues. The research activities are focused on four core areas:

- Molecular recognition of carbohydrates
- Interaction of biomolecules with light
- Directed intracellular processes
- Directed shape changes of tissues
