= Amalie of Nassau-Dietz =

Dutch noblewoman (1655 – 1695)

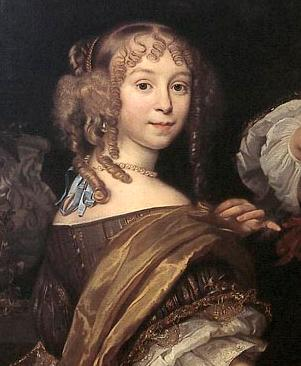
- Cropped from larger painting by Abraham Lambertsz van den Tempel, 1668
- Born: 25 November 1655; The Hague
- Died: 16 February 1695 (aged 39); Allstedt
- Spouse: John William, Duke of Saxe-Eisenach (m. 1690)
- Issue: Wilhelm Heinrich, Duke of Saxe-Eisenach; Albertina Joanetta of Saxe-Eisenach
- Dutch: Amalia van Nassau-Dietz
- House: Nassau-Dietz
- Father: William Frederick, Prince of Nassau-Dietz
- Mother: Albertine Agnes of Nassau

Amalie of Nassau-Dietz (November 25, 1655 – February 16, 1695) was the hereditary Duchess of Saxe-Eisenach by marriage to John William III.

== Life ==
Amalie was born on 25 November 1655 as the first child of William Frederick, Prince of Nassau-Dietz and Countess Albertine Agnes of Nassau.

== Marriage and issue ==
On 28 November 1690, in the Palace of Oranjewoud in Oranjewoud, Amalie married John William III, future Duke of Saxe-Eisenach (1666 – 1729). Of their two children, only their son survived to adulthood:

- Wilhelm Heinrich (1691 – 1741), Duke of Saxe-Eisenach (1729 – 1741)
- Albertina Joanetta of Saxe-Eisenach (28 February 1693 – 1 April 1700)

After Amalie's death, John William III went on to marry three more times.

== Bibliography ==
- Louda, Jiří; Maclagan, Michael (2002). Lines of Succession: Heraldry of the Royal families of Europe (2nd ed.). New York, N.Y.: Barnes & Noble. ISBN 978-0-7607-3287-8. OCLC 1036687061. OL 8013365M – via Internet Archive.

== Ancestors ==
Ancestors of Amalie of Nassau-Dietz

8. John VI, Count of Nassau-Dillenburg
4. Ernest Casimir, Count of Nassau-Dietz
9. Countess Elisabeth of Leuchtenberg
2. William Frederick, Prince of Nassau-Dietz
10. Henry Julius, Duke of Brunswick-Lüneburg
5. Sophia Hedwig of Brunswick-Lüneburg
11. Elizabeth of Denmark
1. Amalie of Nassau-Dietz
12. William the Silent
6. Frederick Henry, Prince of Orange
13. Louise de Coligny
3. Countess Albertine Agnes of Nassau
14. John Albert I, Count of Solms-Braunfels
7. Amalia of Solms-Braunfels
15. Agnes of Sayn-Wittgenstein

Amalie of Nassau-Dietz
House of Nassau-Dietz
Born: 25 November 1669 Died: 16 February 1695
