= Museum Heerenveen =

Museum in Heerenveen, Frisia, the Netherlands

Coordinates: 52.9600°N 5.9259°E

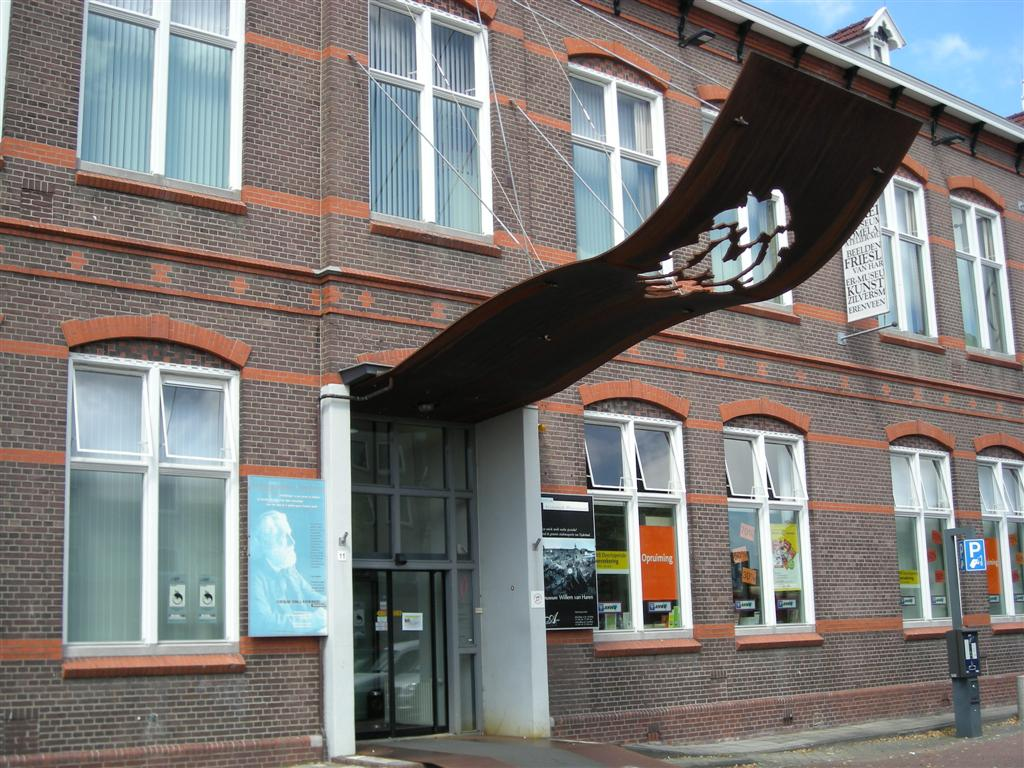
Museum Heerenveen

Museum Heerenveen, formerly Museum Willem van Haren, is a cultural-historical museum in the centre of Heerenveen, in the province of Friesland, the Netherlands. The museum tells the history of the area using archaeological finds, historical objects, and a collection of works by significant local artists such as Jan Mankes.

== History ==
From 1942, a building on the Vleesmarkt served as an antiquities room, housing a collection on the history of Heerenveen. After several moves, the collection relocated in 1982 to the Van Helomahuis on the Van Harenspad. The Oudheidkamer Heerenveen was then transformed into a museum under the name Museum Willem van Haren. This name was derived from the surrounding streets, which in turn were named after the grietman Willem van Haren (1655–1728).

In 1999, the adjacent former school building was added to the museum, creating more space for exhibitions. This building is called De Heerenveense School. It also became home to Ateliers Majeur, a centre for artistic education.

On 12 May 2015 the museum was given a new name, Museum Heerenveen. The date of the name change was deliberately chosen for its symbolic background: 12 May was traditionally the day on which peat-digging contracts were renewed.

== Collections and exhibitions ==
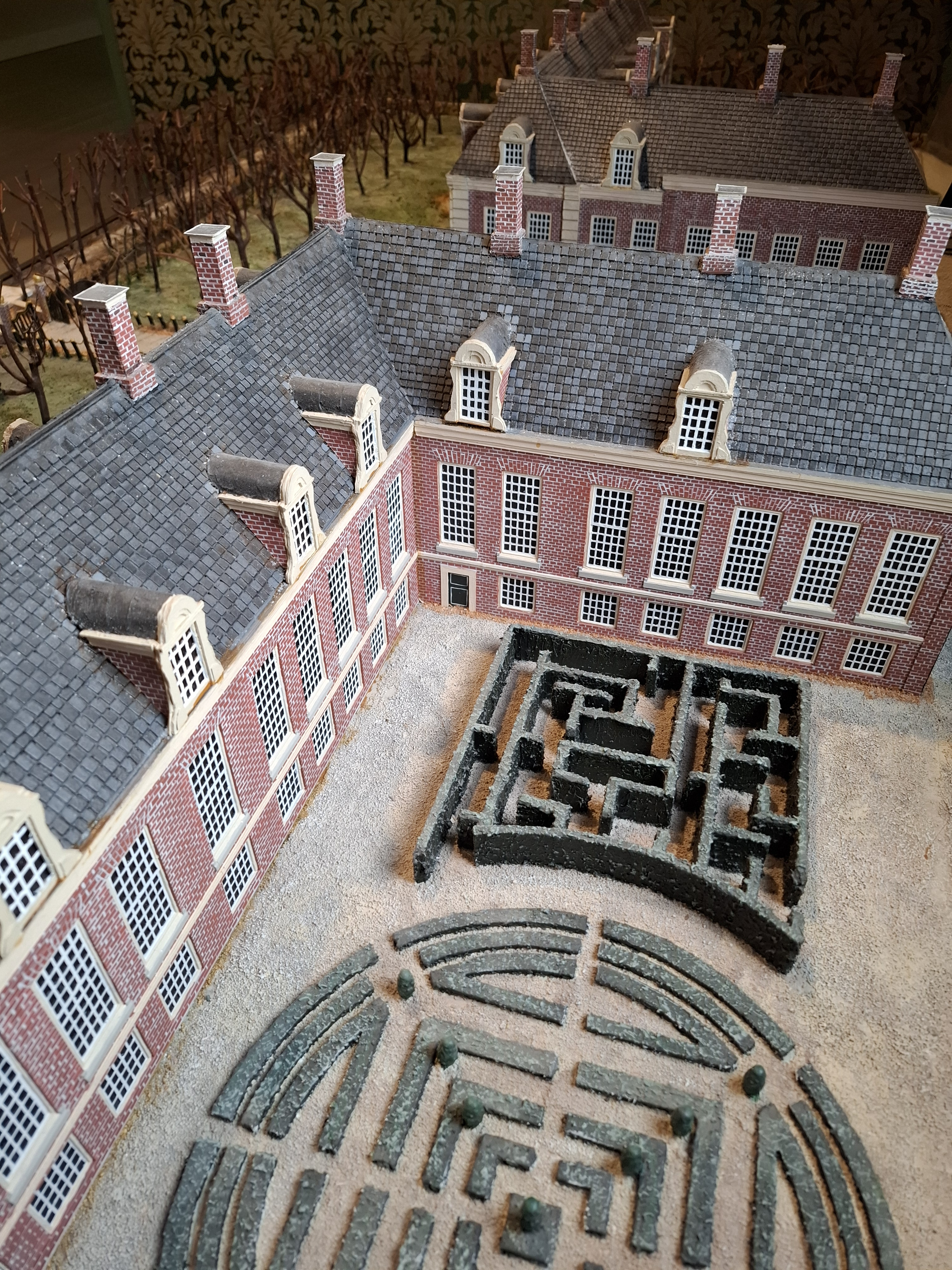
In its collections, the museum presents a model of the Palace of Oranjewoud

The Museum's collection includes:

- History of Heerenveen (including a scale model of Heerenveen as it looked in 1830).
- Exhibition on the Palace of Oranjewoud, including a scale model, and its residents; and the manor houses later built on the Oranjewoud (Estate).
- The Museum on Ferdinand Domela Nieuwenhuis is also housed within Museum Heerenveen.
