= Oranjewoud (estate) =

Coordinates: 52.9442°N 5.9675°E

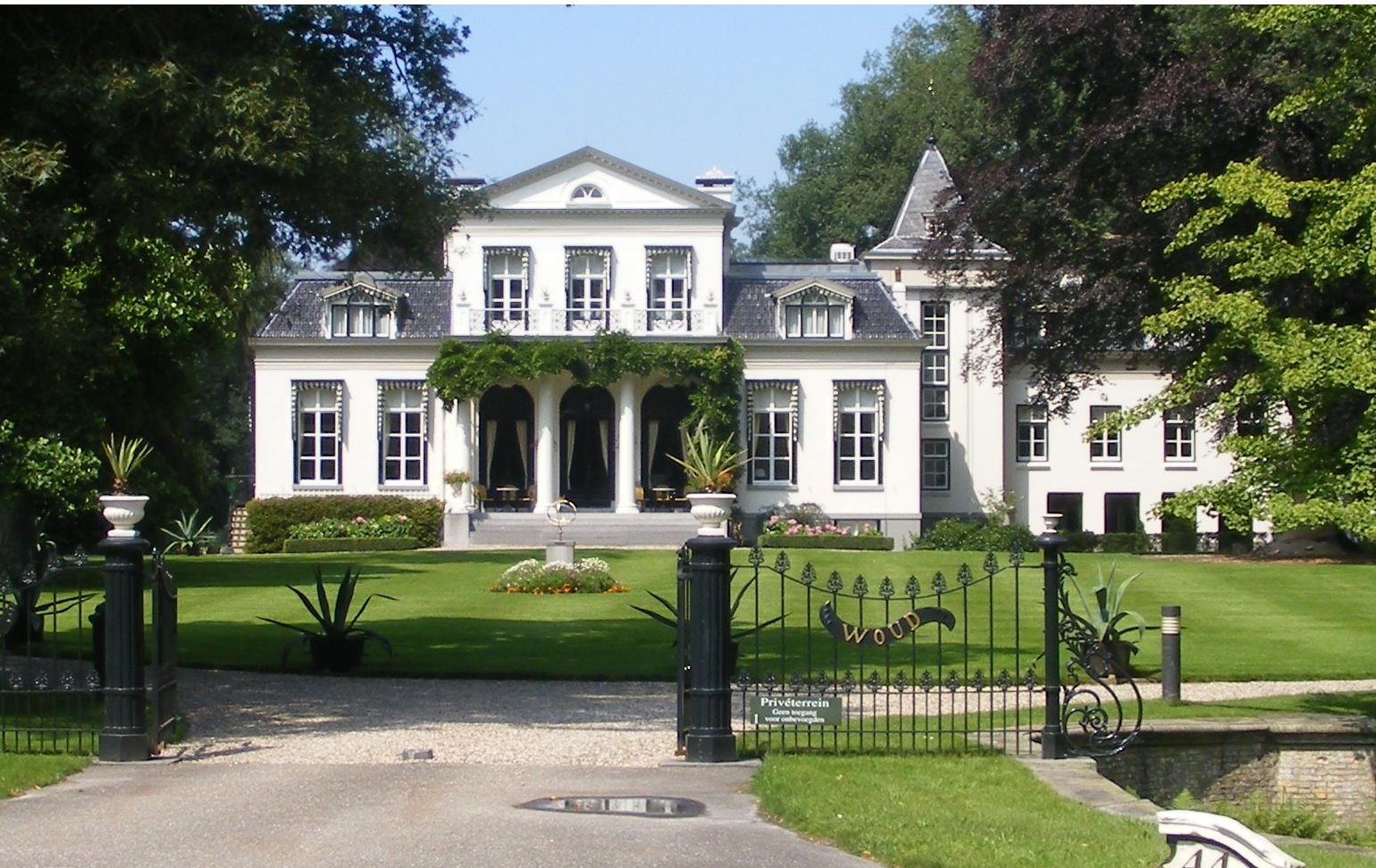
Oranjewoud - The current house

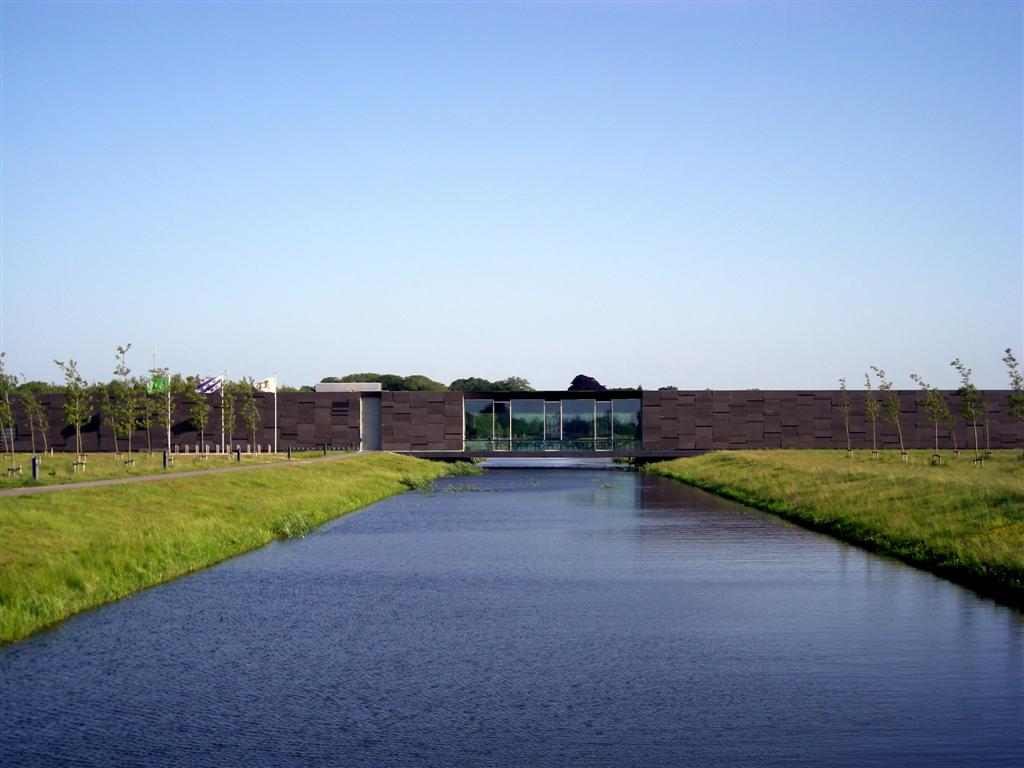
Museum Belvédère

Landgoed Oranjewoud is an estate in Oranjewoud in the Province of Friesland in the Netherlands. Until 1803, the Oranjewoud Palace of the Frisian branch of the Oranje-Nassau family stood here.

Albertine Agnes of Nassau, widow of the Frisian Stadtholder William Frederick, Prince of Nassau-Dietz, acquired the Schoterswoud near Heerenveen in 1675 — an estate consisting of various tracts of land, wooded parcels, and buildings. There she built a pleasure palace (lustslot) and had beautiful gardens laid out. After her death, her grandson John William Friso, Prince of Orange inherited it and commissioned Daniel Marot to design Oranjewoud Palace there. Construction began in 1708. The prince's wife, Marie Louise of Hesse-Kassel, continued the project after her husband's death. This palace was never fully completed, only the side wings were completed. After a period of neglect, it was demolished during the French period, between 1803 and 1805. The court garden with the surrounding moat now belongs to the present-day Oranjewoud estate, while the overtuin (the garden across from the manor house) is now the public park De Overtuin.

The current house on the estate was built in 1829.

In 2004, the estate was expanded on the north side. In this new section, Museum Belvédère, designed by architect Eerde Schippers, was built. The building is finished with black basalt slabs. It is the first museum for modern and contemporary art in Friesland.
