= Palace of Oranjewoud =

Former palace in Oranjewoud, Frisia, the Netherlands

Coordinates: 52.9442°N 5.9675°E

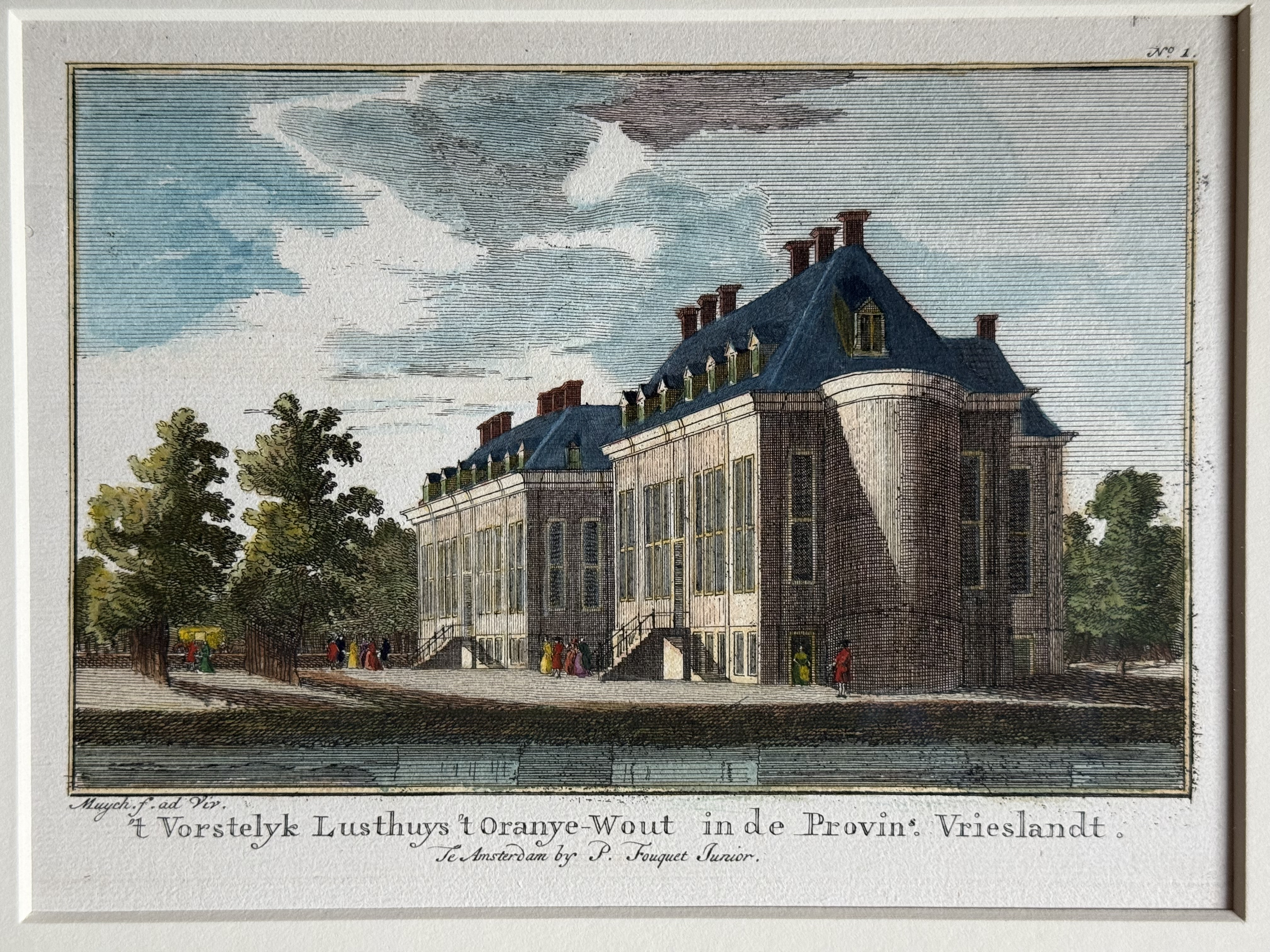
The Palace of Oranjewoud

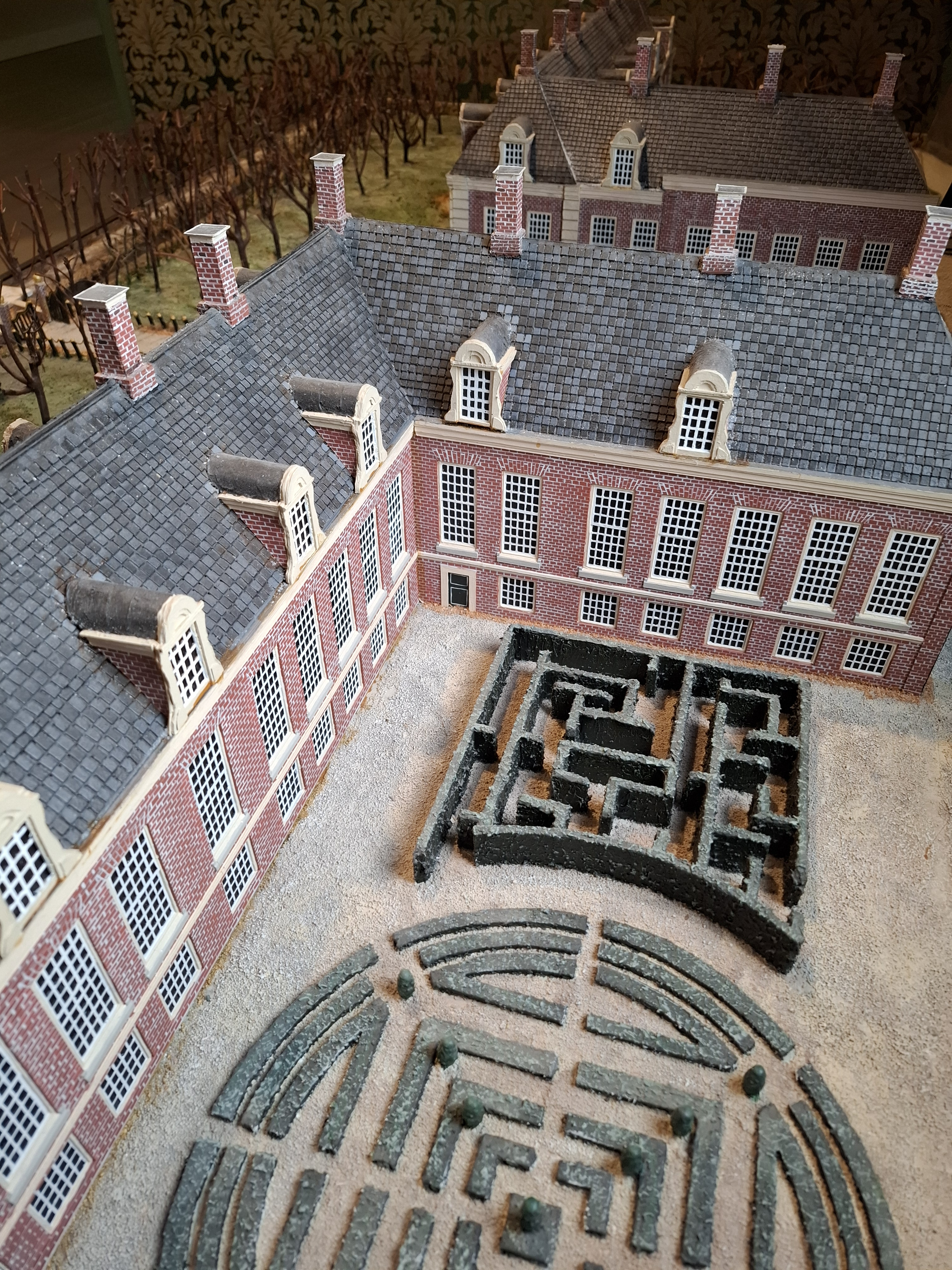
Museum Heerenveen has a model showing Palace Oranjewoud in its heyday

The Palace of Oranjewoud, also referred to as Lustslot Oranjewoud (Pleasure Palace Oranjewoud), was a palace formerly situated in the village of Oranjewoud, within the municipality of Heerenveen, in the province of Friesland, the Netherlands. Following its demolition, a new manor house was erected on the site of the former foundations in 1829, subsequently known as Landgoed Oranjewoud (the Oranjewoud Estate).

The palace served principally as a summer residence for the Frisian branch of the House of Orange-Nassau, including successive Princes of Orange. The House of Orange held several properties within the village, a number of which survive to the present day, as do most of the woodlands and parks established during this period. The presence of the Oranges attracted numerous other noble houses to the area. The members of the House of Orange who resided at Oranjewoud constitute the direct ancestral line of the reigning monarch, King Willem-Alexander.

Museum Heerenveen has a model showing how the palace looked in its heyday.

== History ==
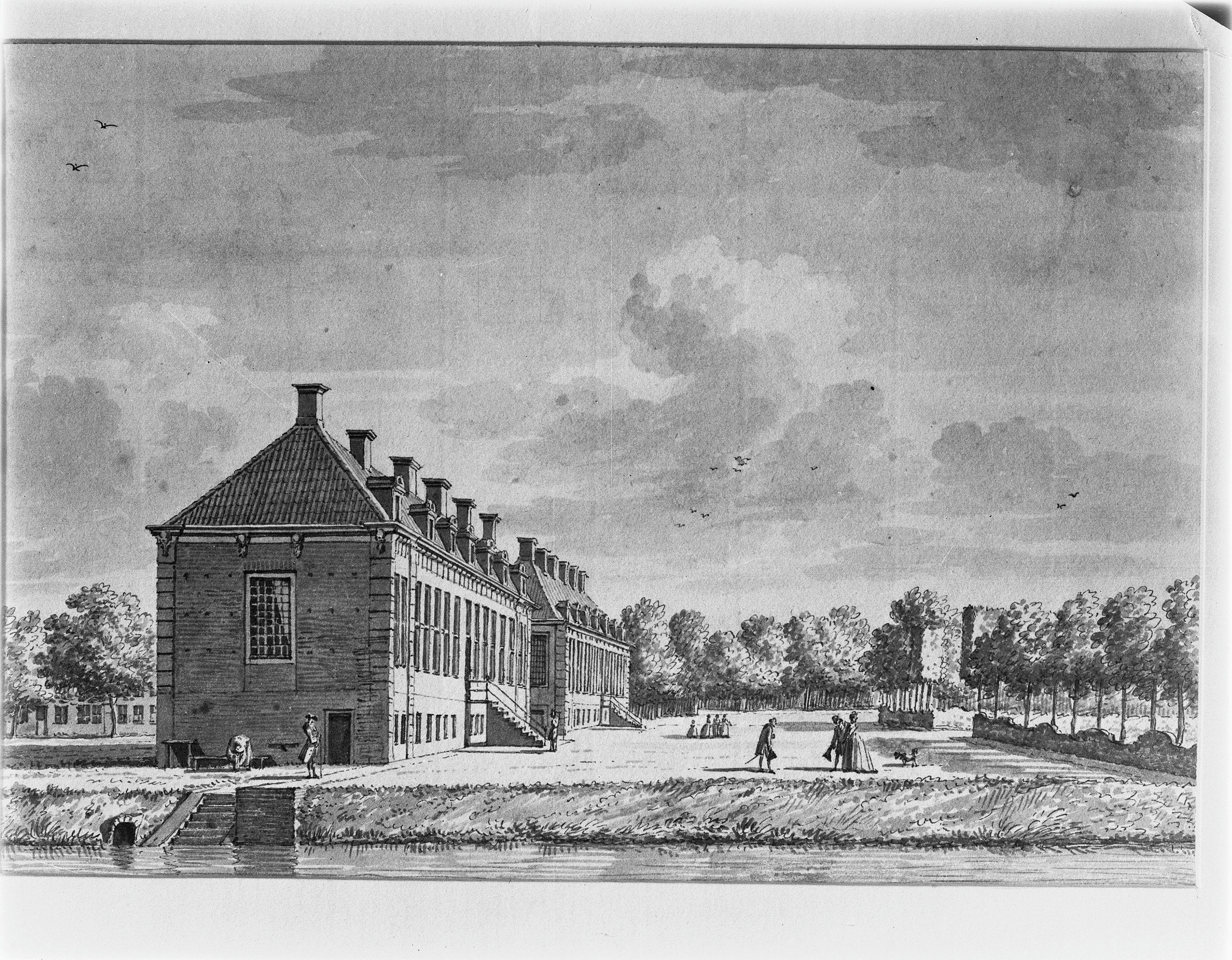
View from the West to Palace of Oranjewoud by Cornelis Pronk (1754) On the left at the back, behind the trees is the Sickingastate, the old manor house

=== Origins of the House of Orange's Presence at Oranjewoud ===
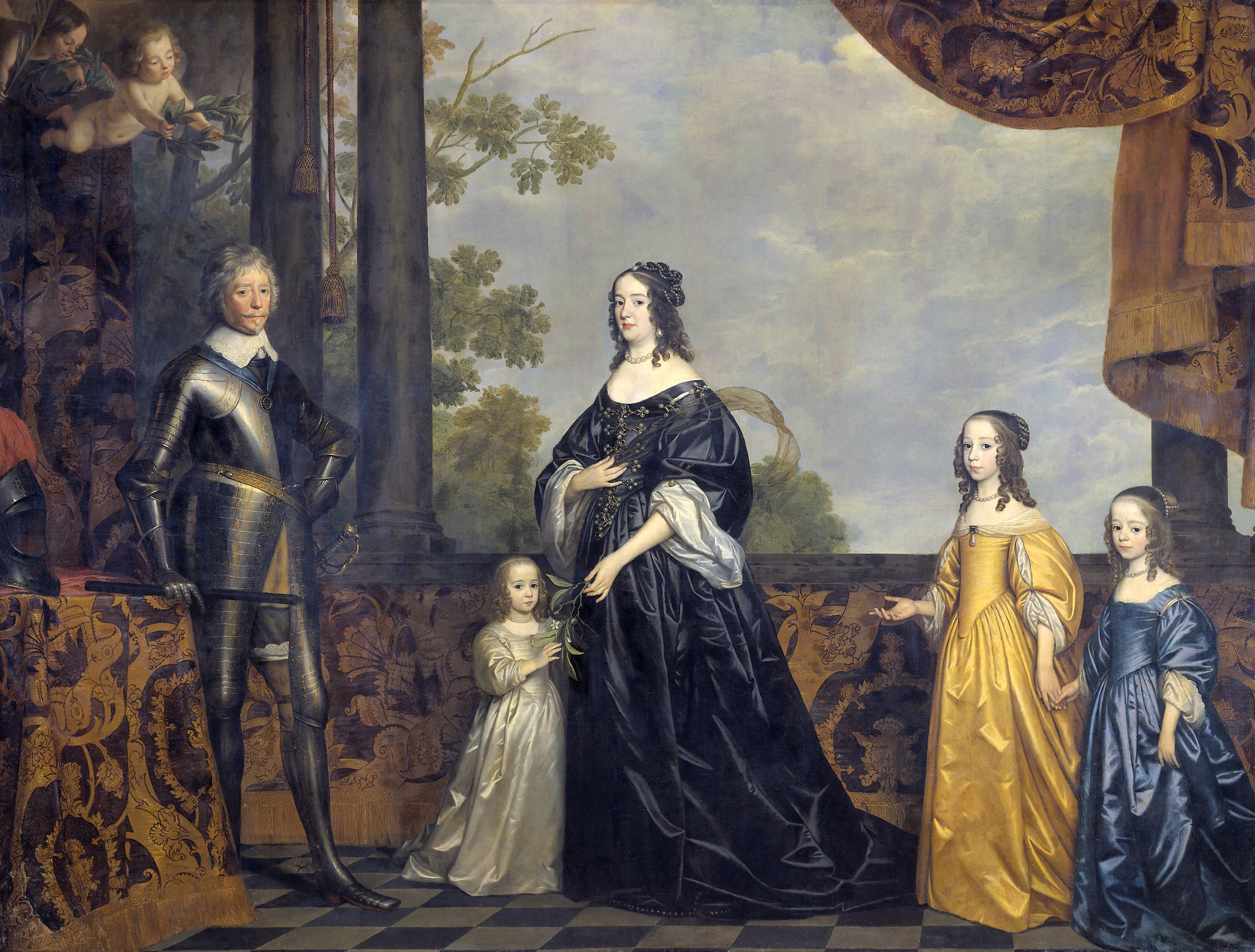
Frederick Henry and his family, painted by Gerrit van Honthorst (c. 1647); Albertine Agnes is depicted as the princess in the white dress

From 1587 onward, the Frisian branch of the House of Nassau furnished the stadtholders of Friesland. In 1702, following the extinction of the Holland branch upon the death of stadtholder-king William III, this Frisian branch inherited the title of Prince of Orange. Since 1587 the Frisian Nassaus had resided at the Stadhouderlijk Hof in Leeuwarden, where the family also maintained its own burial vault in the Grote or Jacobijnerkerk.

Princess and Countess Albertine Agnes of Nassau belonged to the Holland branch of the House and was born in The Hague, the daughter of Frederick Henry, Prince of Orange, and Amalia van Solms; William the Silent, Prince of Orange, was her grandfather. Her mother had commissioned the construction of the Huis ten Bosch palace, which Albertine Agnes was entitled to occupy following her mother's death but ultimately declined to inhabit, disposing of the property to her cousin, stadtholder-king William III.

Albertine Agnes married her second cousin, William Frederick, Prince of Nassau-Dietz, stadtholder of Friesland and subsequently of Drenthe and Groningen, whereupon she relocated to Leeuwarden. She served as acting stadtholder on behalf of their son, Henry Casimir II, until 1675, and, pending his majority, as regent of the county of Dietz in Germany, where she commissioned the construction of a further residence, Oranienstein Palace, a property she thereafter visited infrequently. It would appear that Albertine Agnes sought a country estate within closer proximity to Leeuwarden. She was widely known as a patron of major architectural projects and a keen collector of paintings and other works of art, a reputation later reflected in the furnishing of Oranjewoud itself.

Among the earliest country estates in the area now known as Oranjewoud was Sickingastate, first documented in 1552. In the following year it was acquired by the Frisian councillor and knight Pieter van Dekema, a nobleman of pro-Spanish sympathies who had received his knighthood from the Emperor Charles V. Van Dekema subsequently transferred the estate to his father-in-law, Gerrit van Loo, under whose ownership thousands of trees were already being planted. The property remained within the family through the marriage of Van Loo's son-in-law, Allert van Sierxma, whose daughter married the young nobleman Tjalke van Sickinga; it later passed into the possession of Barent van Sevenaer. Sickingastate was situated on one of the canals of the Schoterlandse Compagnonsvaart, facilitating access even for heavy materials. The surrounding region, then known as Schoterwold or simply 't Wold, comprised peat and sandy soils supporting woodland and heath, and served as hunting terrain.

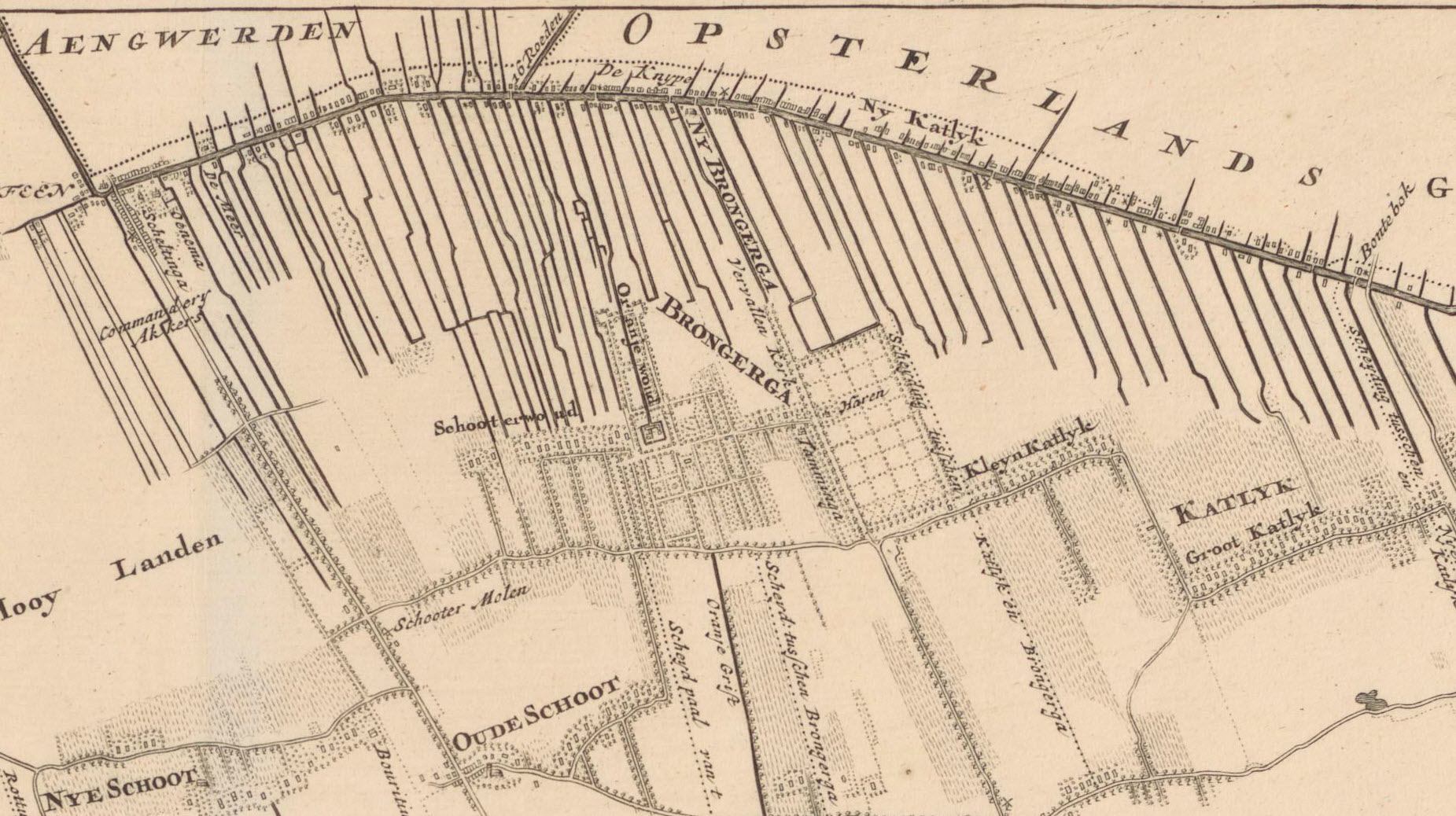
Detail from a map of the grietenij Schoterland by Schotanus showing Oranjewoud (1698)

In June 1676, Albertine Agnes acquired the Sickingastate estate, already designated that year as Oranienwout, together with a tract of woodland. As members of the House of Orange were formally prohibited from holding property in Friesland in their own right, she sought and obtained the requisite permission from the States of Friesland. At this juncture several estates already existed within 't Wold, among them Pauwenburg, home successively to the Van Oenema and Van Haren families.

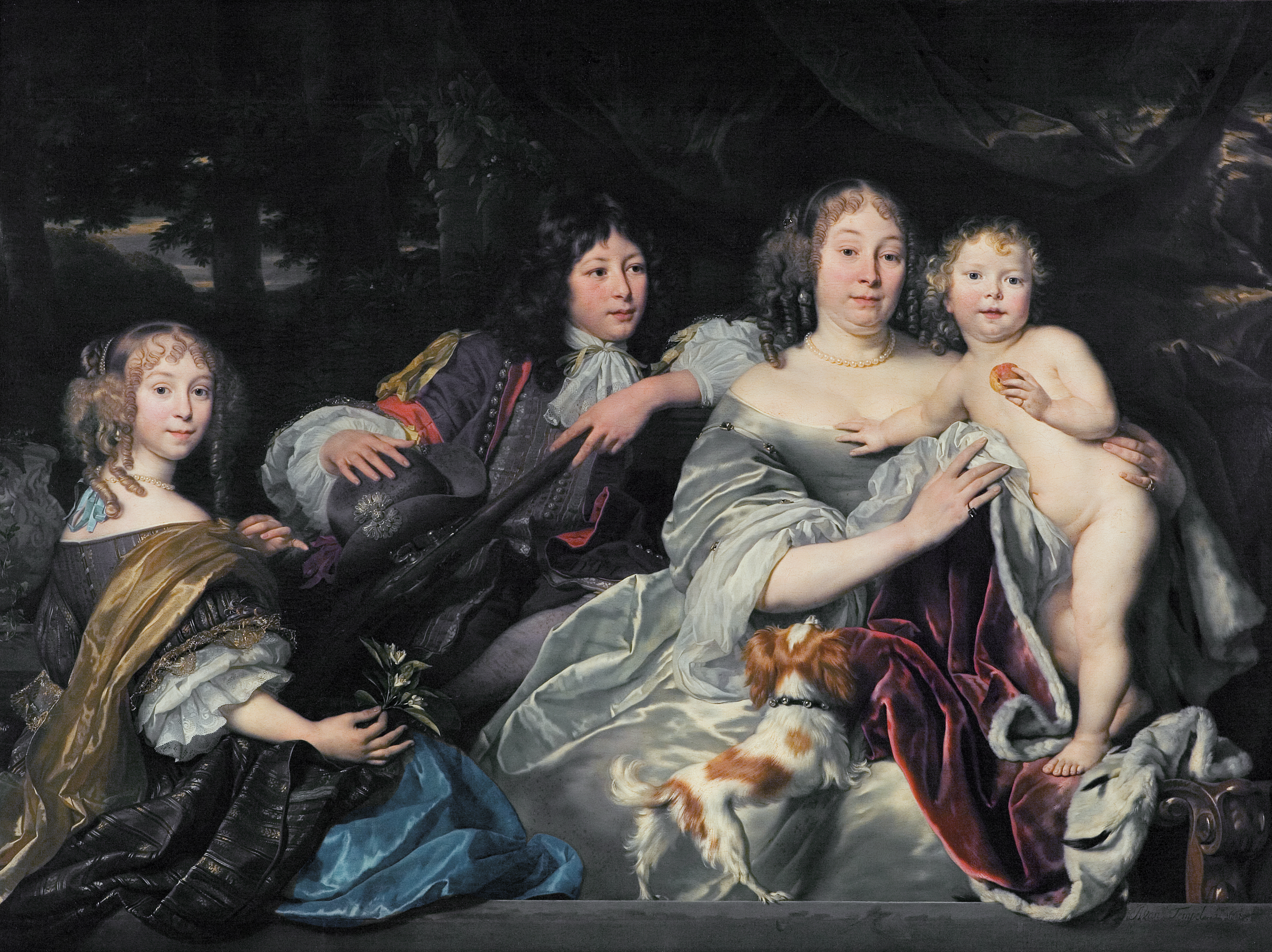
Albertina Agnes and her three children (Amalia, Henry Casimir II, and Wilhelmina Sophia), painted by Abraham van den Tempel (1668)

The estate purchased by Albertine Agnes from Barent van Sevenaer was not unfamiliar to her: from 1665, following the death of her husband William Frederick, she had already resided there with some regularity. The estate at that time comprised the country house proper, three tenant farms, and heathland, to which she subsequently added further woodland. Within a relatively short interval she undertook an expansion of the property, commissioning avenues, tree-lined walks, and baroque gardens executed after the French model.

=== From Country House to Palace ===
Once the princess had acquired Oranjewoud, the requisite furnishings and household goods were transported there via the waterways connecting Leeuwarden, Grouw, and Akkrum. The estate possessed its own canal connection to the Schoterlandse Compagnonsvaart, designated the Prinsenwijk, and a turning basin, the Prinsenkom, was constructed to permit vessels arriving from Leeuwarden to manoeuvre; a boathouse housing a covered yacht was erected there at a later date. With the arrival of the household goods, work commenced on furnishing what was to become the stadtholder's summer residence.

Stadtholder Henry Casimir II, son of Albertine Agnes, undertook an expansion of the country house in 1681, adding several additional chambers. To embellish the residence, it was furnished with valuable paintings by old masters, including works by Melchior d'Hondecoeter, Peter Paul Rubens, Paulus Moreelse, Caspar Netscher, Michiel van Mierevelt, Hercules Seghers, Roelant Savery, and Gerard van Honthorst, among them portraits of Frederick Henry and Albertine Agnes.

By this period the estate comprised, in addition to the country house and its gardens, further residences, stables, barns, and an orangery housing the orange trees. Livestock was maintained alongside the horses, together with deer and roe deer, poultry and swans, fish reared in ornamental ponds, and beehives; a watermill was likewise present. Crops, vegetables, and herbs were cultivated on the estate, and meals were customarily announced by the ringing of a bell three times daily.

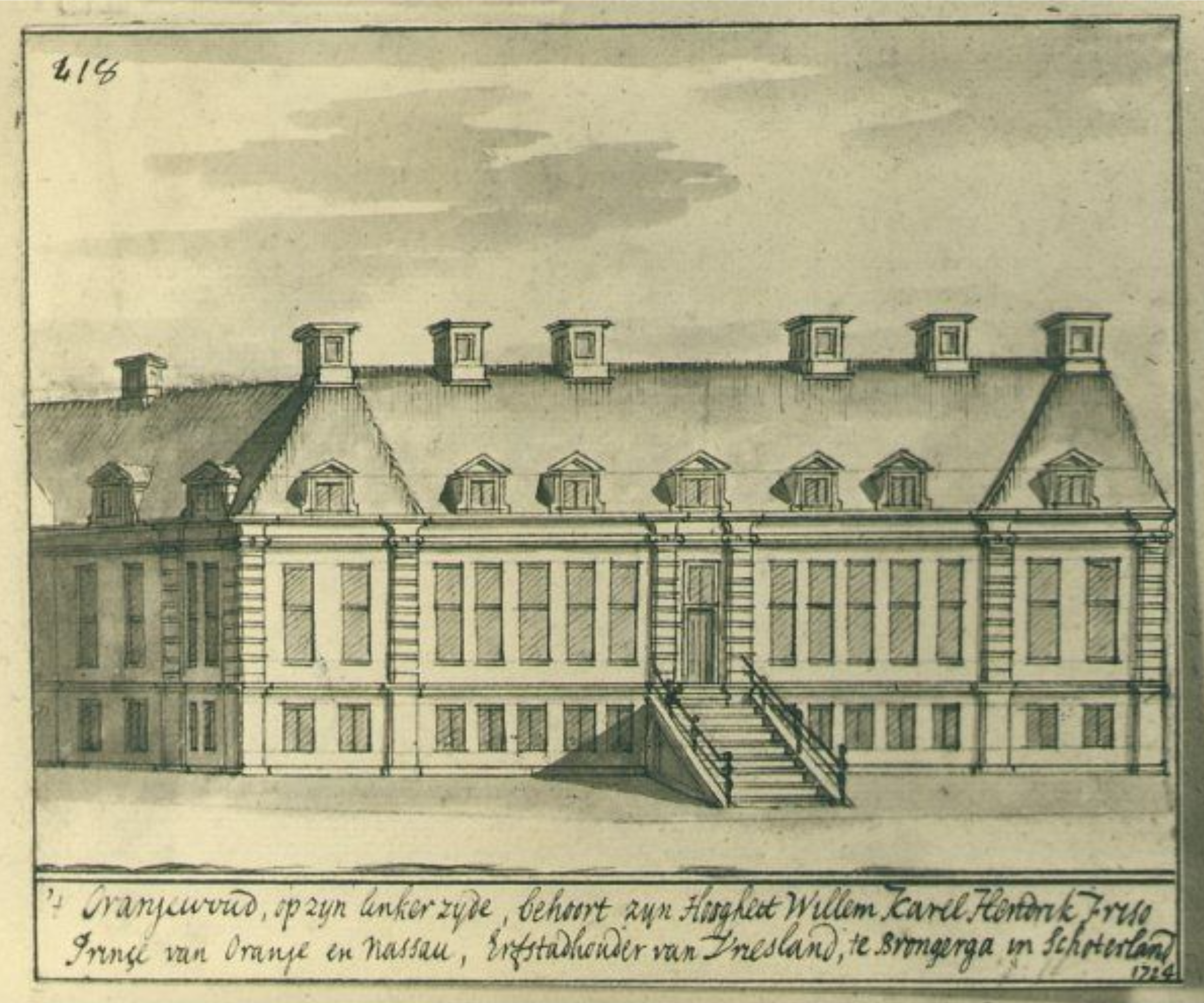
The east wing of the Palace of Oranjewoud by Jacob Stellingwerf (1724)

Following the deaths of Henry Casimir II and Albertine Agnes, ownership passed to Henry Casimir II's widow, Henriëtte Amalia of Anhalt-Dessau, whose mother was, incidentally, the sister of Albertine Agnes. Henriëtte Amalia undertook further embellishment of the existing structure; this notwithstanding, in 1701 she commissioned the French architect Daniel Marot to develop plans for an entirely new palace at Oranjewoud.

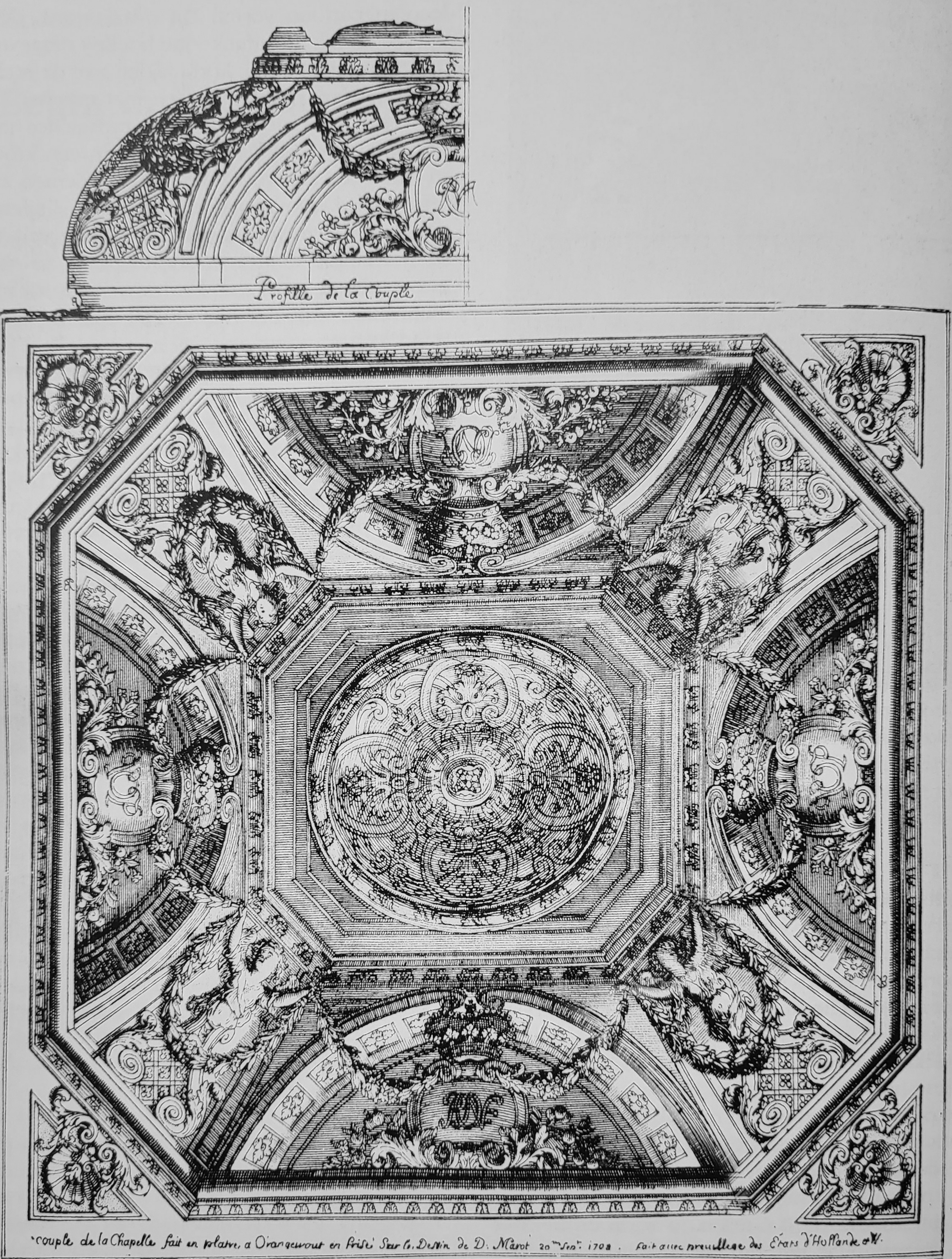
Design by Daniel Marot for the dome of the main building of Palace Oranjewoud (1708); never realized

Construction of this new palace commenced in 1703, rendering it, in common with Het Loo Palace, an edifice modelled on French precedent. Daniel Marot's design was executed in the Baroque idiom. Stone was procured from Amsterdam and marble from Germany; two wings were constructed, together with the foundations for the central building, the corps de logis. By 1707 construction had progressed sufficiently for Marot to formulate a scheme for the interior decoration; the plasterwork was executed by the Swiss stuccoist Simon. Marot himself furnished the design for the palace's dome, comparable to that of the Orange Hall at Huis ten Bosch Palace, though this element was never realised owing to the prince's indebtedness, which precluded further construction of the central building. The two wings were substantially completed by approximately 1711.

The two wings were externally almost identical, with the exception that the east wing incorporated a chapel. Each wing comprised fifteen window bays to the front elevation and four to the interior side, together with a basement, a bel-étage, and a steep roof clad in blue tiles, each wing's roof carrying six chimneys and seven dormer windows. The palace was built in a restrained classicist Baroque style, its scale rather than its ornamentation conveying the standing of the stadtholder's family; each wing's bel-étage, fitted with large sash windows in the English manner, was reached by broad, high staircases. As no measured plans of the building survive, its overall dimensions can only be estimated from surviving drawings — chiefly those by Cornelis Pronk, considered the most reliable — and have been put at an overall length of somewhere between 74 and 97 metres. A drawing of the palace made by Pronk in 1754, now preserved in the Fries Museum, provides a valuable impression of its appearance during this period. The palace stood upon the Lindelaan and was accessible via a bridge or causeway. Within the court garden situated between the palace and the Lindelaan stood four long rows of trees bordered by tall hedges.

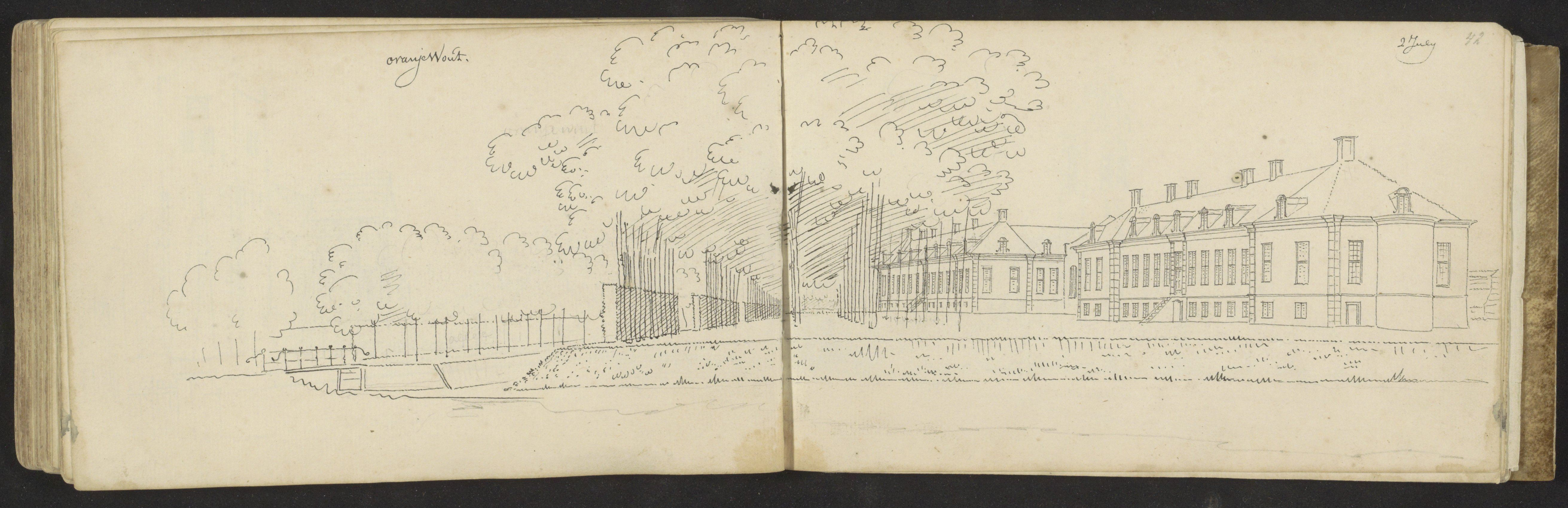
The palace of Oranjewoud in the sketchbook of Abraham de Haen (1732)

=== Princely Residents and Royal Visitors ===
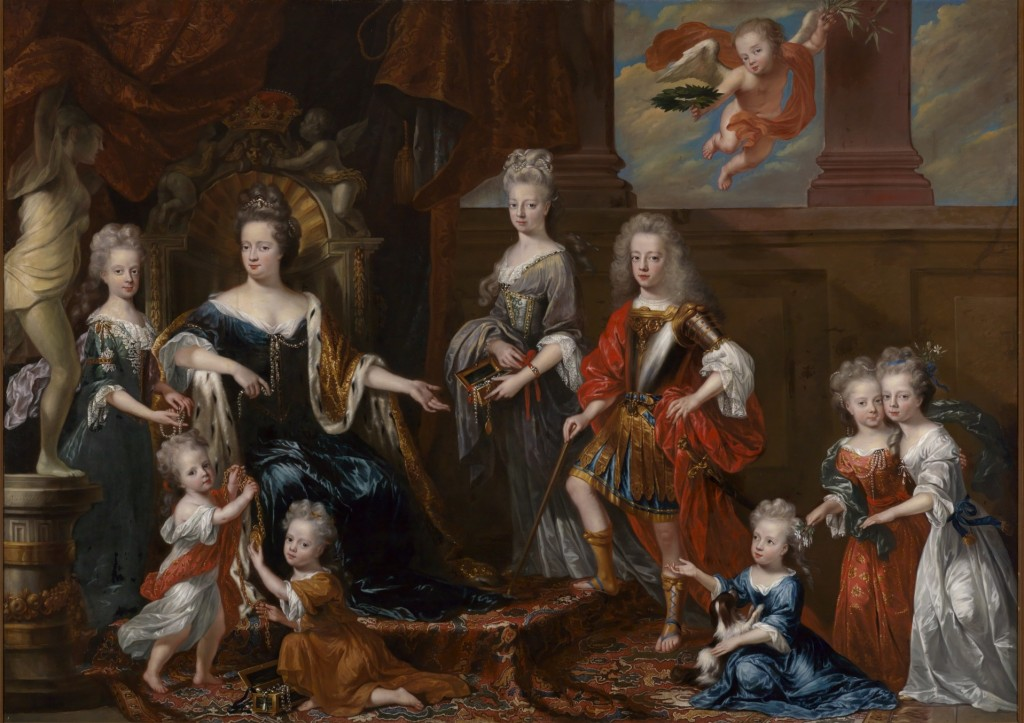
Henriëtte Amalia with her children by Lancelot Volders (1699), Johan William Friso, Prince of Orange, stands in the middle

The palace was successively inhabited by Albertine Agnes (1676–1696), Henriëtte Amalia of Anhalt-Dessau (1696–1726), Maria Louise of Hesse-Kassel (1726–1765), and William IV (1765–1795).

Princess and Countess Albertine Agnes of Orange-Nassau took up residence at Oranjewoud from 1676, having previously visited the estate with some frequency. By this time she was already widowed, her husband William Frederick of Nassau-Dietz having died in the course of a hunting expedition. Her children, Amalia of Nassau-Dietz and Henry Casimir II, likewise resided there regularly. The name of Amalia in particular remains closely associated with the estate, she having married Duke Johann Wilhelm III of Saxe-Eisenach at Oranjewoud on 28 September 1690, and having there given birth to their son, William Henry of Saxe-Eisenach, subsequently ruler of the principality of Saxe-Eisenach. The estate could accommodate large numbers when multiple members of the House of Orange were in residence, on which occasions a portion of the court household would likewise travel from Leeuwarden and Germany.

Albertine Agnes died at the palace on 24 May 1696. Although she had expressed a wish to be interred at Oranjewoud, she was instead laid to rest in the burial vault of the Frisian Nassaus at Leeuwarden. Her only son, Henry Casimir II, had predeceased her by several months, and the estate accordingly passed to his widow, Henriëtte Amalia of Anhalt-Dessau. The couple had by this time had nine children, the majority daughters, with a single surviving son, Johan Willem Friso of Nassau-Dietz; as he remained a minor, Henriëtte Amalia acted as his regent until 1707, successfully securing the succession to the Prince of Orange for her son after the death of the childless William III in 1702.

Johan Willem Friso maintained several rooms within the palace furnished for his particular use, and it is probable that his seven sisters — among them Maria Amalia, Sophia Hedwig, and Isabella Charlotte — were likewise frequent occupants of Oranjewoud.

Upon the death of the stadtholder-king William III in 1702, Johan Willem Friso inherited both his estate and the title of Prince of Orange. Following his mother's relocation to Dietz in Germany in 1707, the prince assumed direction of the palace's ongoing construction. Both wings of the palace were substantially completed by 1711 — the same year in which Johan Willem Friso drowned near Moerdijk, with the result that the palace was never brought to full completion. When Johan Willem Friso died so unexpectedly, Henriëtte Amalia failed to secure the regency on behalf of her infant grandson, the future William IV, the States of Friesland instead preferring her daughter-in-law Maria Louise for the role.

Upon the prince's death in 1711, the palace passed to his son, Prince William IV, Prince of Orange, though his widow, Maria Louise of Hesse-Kassel, retained the right to make use of the palace in perpetuity — a privilege she exercised extensively, particularly during the summer months, and for which the Frisian populace referred to her as "Marijke-muoi." She additionally maintained a town residence at Leeuwarden, the Princessehof. Her journeys to Oranjewoud were undertaken by coach and carriage, accompanied by her court retinue, via Bergum.

At the palace, Maria Louise frequently received guests and members of the Frisian nobility, including the families Van Burmania and Van Haren. Dinners were prepared under the direction of the household cooks, with the cellar-master responsible for the provision of wines; a surviving deed attests even to the existence of a wine designated "Oranjewoud wine." Banquets and meals were customarily accompanied by musical entertainment.

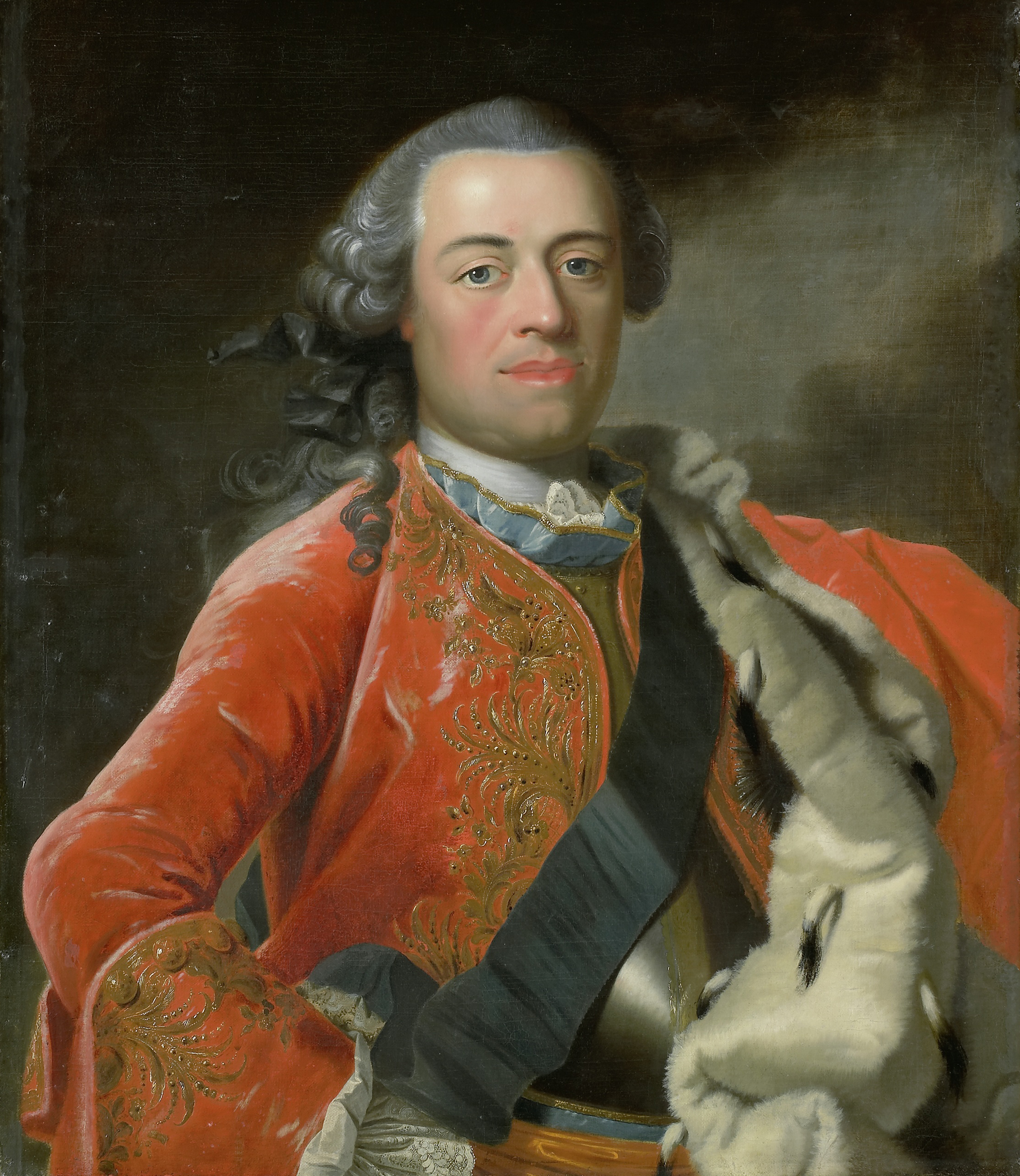
Stadtholder William IV, Prince of Orange (1750)

William IV, who became the first hereditary stadtholder of the Republic of the Seven United Netherlands, was frequently present at Oranjewoud, including during the winter months, as was his sister, Anna Charlotte Amelia. Although hunting had long been practised within the woods of Oranjewoud by members of the House of Orange, William IV was granted exclusive hunting rights within the territory from 1749 onward, the prince's hunting grounds thereafter being demarcated by boundary posts. After 1747, when William IV was elevated to stadtholder of all the United Provinces and relocated permanently to The Hague, Oranjewoud was left largely unoccupied; his grandmother, Maria Louise, remained behind and founded a smaller residence, Mariënburg, just outside Leeuwarden, where she lived until her death in 1765. Following William IV's death, his widow, Princess Anne of Hanover, paid occasional visits to the palace.

Princess Anne of Hanover, eldest daughter of the British monarch George II of Great Britain, had been raised under the guardianship of her grandfather, King George I of Great Britain, and had received instruction in singing and the harpsichord from George Frideric Handel during her childhood. Her visits to Oranjewoud were accompanied by her children, Carolina of Orange-Nassau and Prince William V, Prince of Orange, on which occasions members of the Frisian nobility were received at the palace, among them Baron Hobbe Esaias van Aylva, governor of Maastricht, the poet and statesman Onno Zwier van Haren, and Georg Frederik, Baron Thoe Schwartzenberg und Hohenlansberg.

William V paid a final visit to Oranjewoud in 1777, some years before he was compelled to leave the country. Upon the proclamation of the Batavian Republic in 1795, the entire estate of stadtholder William V — father of King William I of the Netherlands — was confiscated by the state. Although the Dutch royal family continued to pay frequent visits to Oranjewoud in the decades and centuries thereafter, this event effectively marked the end of the palace itself.

== The Palace Interior ==
Model of the Oranjewoud palace kept at Museum Heerenveen

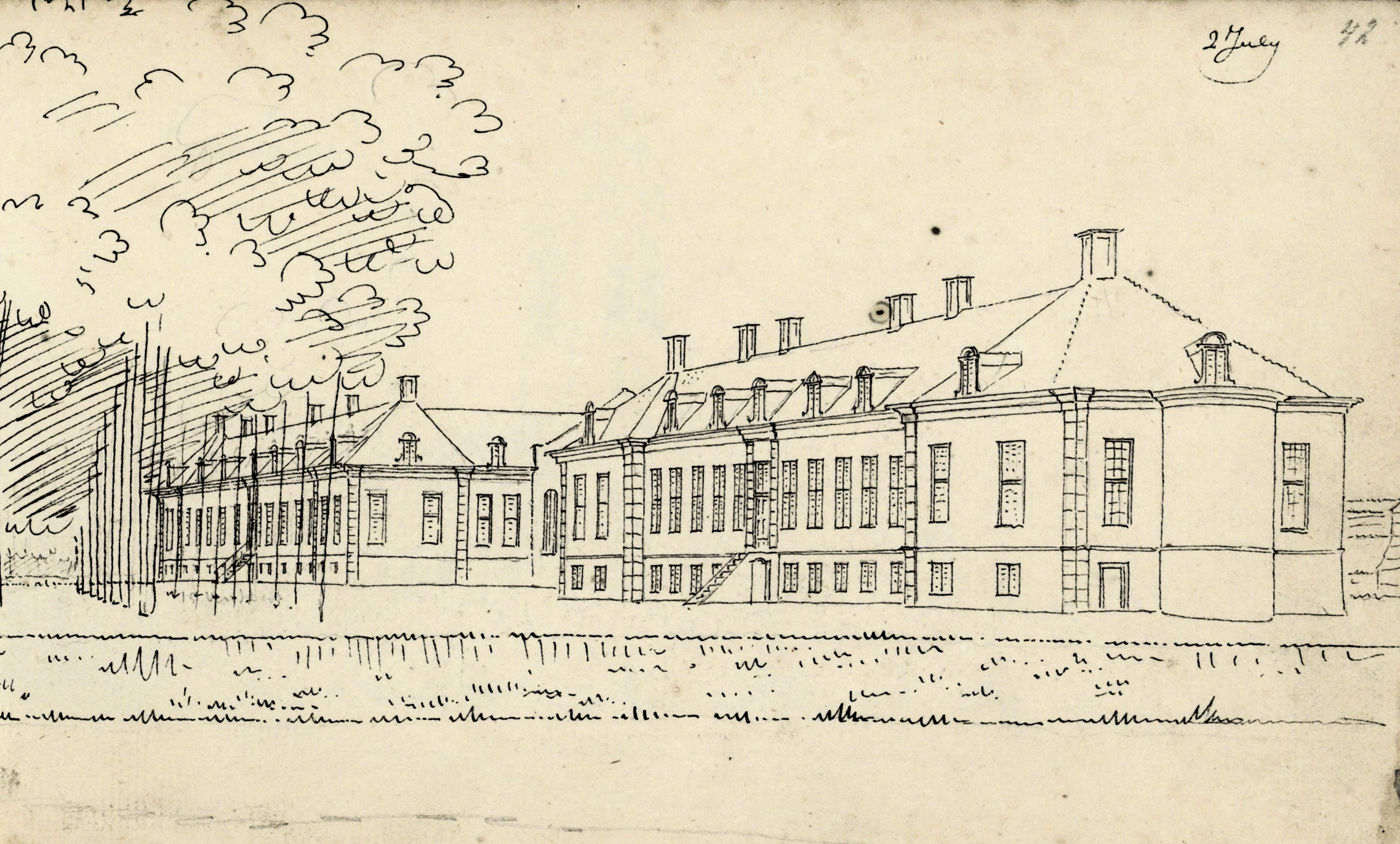
View from the East to the Palace of Oranjewoud (1732)

The interior was designed by Daniel Marot in the Louis XIV style, comprising ornamented chambers characteristic of the Baroque period. Marot was engaged by Henriëtte Amalia of Anhalt-Dessau, widow of Henry Casimir II. In 1708, Marot produced a design for the dome of the palace chapel within the principal building, a drawing of which survives.

=== The State Apartments of the West Wing ===
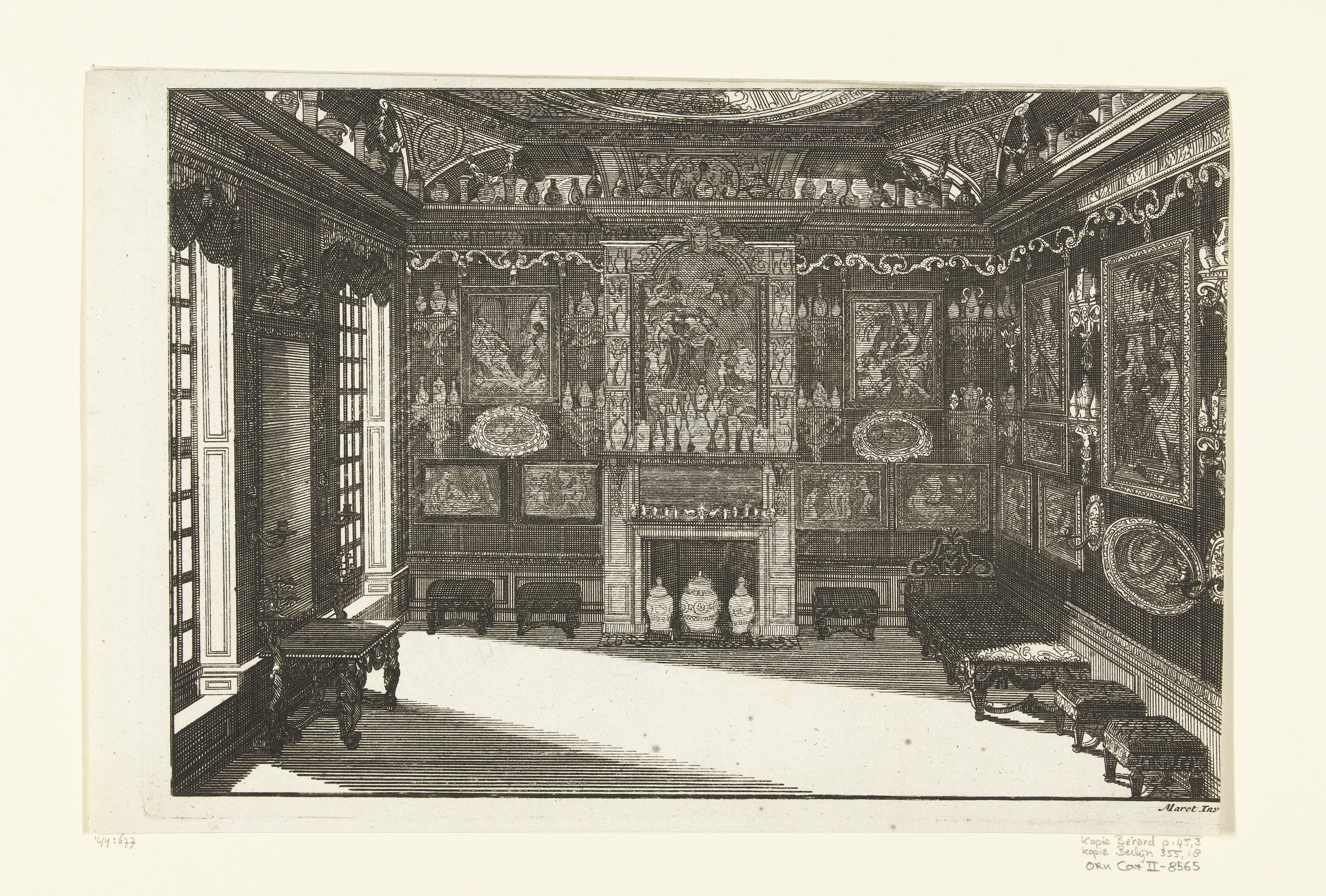
A design for a cabinet with paintings by Daniel Marot, from around the period when he designed the interior of the Palace of Oranjewoud

The west wing housed the apartments reserved for members of the princely family. As at Het Loo Palace, Daniel Marot was similarly responsible for the interior arrangement of the rooms at Oranjewoud. These apartments were furnished with stuccowork and mirrors executed by the Italian stuccoists Joseph Barberino and Gianbattista Albisetti, both of whom had likewise been employed at Huis ten Bosch Palace in The Hague.

The wall decoration was undertaken by the Leeuwarden painter Freerk Hayema, while the sculptor Pieter Nauta was responsible for the ornamental figures adorning the chimneypieces and walls. The interior further displayed additional works by old masters. As at the Palace of Versailles and Soestdijk Palace, the rooms were arranged along a single continuous axis — an arrangement designated an enfilade, characteristic of Baroque architectural planning.

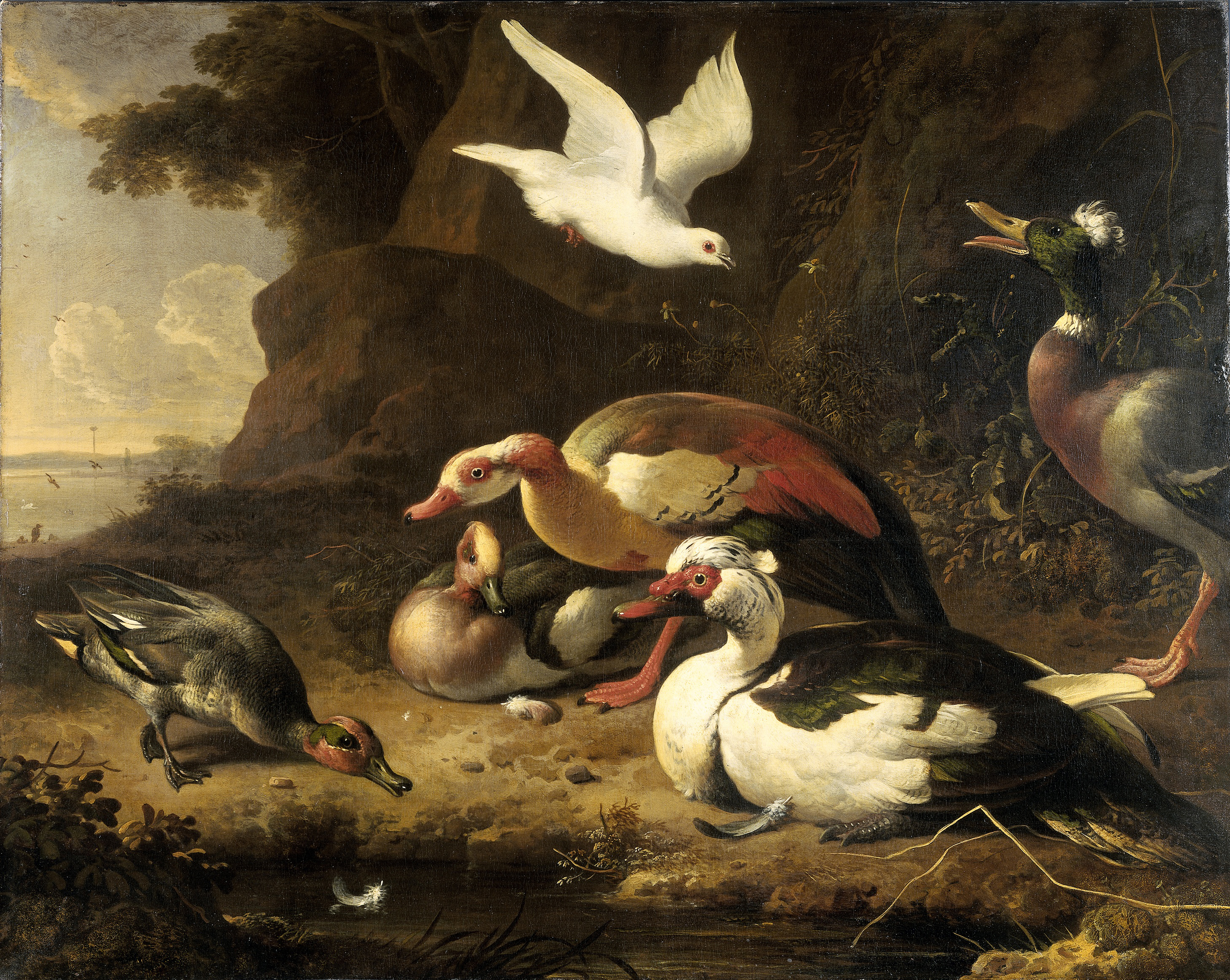
Ducks by Melchior d'Hondecoeter; this canvas hung in the dining hall at the Palace of Oranjewoud, and can now be admired at the Rijksmuseum

The dining hall contained, among other works, the canvas Ducks by Melchior d'Hondecoeter, presently held in the Rijksmuseum, Amsterdam. Nine tapestries bearing the arms of Orange were likewise displayed there, together with the Hedwig Glass, dated to the eleventh or twelfth century. The furnishings varied according to occasion: in 1711, for example, mourning tapestries were hung following the death of Johan Willem Friso.

Around 1718, Prince Johan Willem Friso and his consort Maria Louise maintained a private suite within the palace comprising a dining room and separate bedchambers for the prince and princess. The suite was hung with brown wall coverings, with a painting positioned above the doorway, and was furnished with a walnut table, a small tea table, and twelve chairs upholstered in red damask.

Henriëtte Amalia maintained her own princess's apartments within the palace, designated for the reception of audiences: a reception chamber adjoined by a bedchamber, a study, a dressing room, and the bedchamber of "Her Highness." The study housed a portrait gallery comprising thirty-four family portraits, including one of Johan Willem Friso executed by Lancelot Volders, together with a cabinet for the display of porcelain.

The bedchamber of "Her Highness" was hung with velvet wall coverings depicting rural and fishing scenes, and contained the state bed of the period — a ceremonial bed upholstered in velvet — together with several items of furniture procured from The Hague, and an East Indian cabinet. The portrait of Albertine Agnes with her children, executed by Netscher circa 1675, was displayed within this chamber, while in the adjoining corridor hung the group portrait of the Counts of Nassau by Wybrand de Geest, presently held in the Rijksmuseum, Amsterdam. The palace contained no fewer than seven state beds in total, each with rich upholstery.

The bedchamber of Prince William IV contained, among other items, a four-poster bed, a table covered in red damask, and a cabinet housing toys, while that of Princess Anna Charlotte Amelia contained a child's bed in blue damask with gilt ornamentation, together with a four-poster bed; the windows were hung with curtains of bombazine, the walls covered in gilt leather, and paintings positioned above the doorways.

The apartments upon the bel-étage were reserved for members of the court household, who were for the most part of foreign origin, principally German and French. The so-called "orange loft" served as a repository for furniture, while the cellars accommodated the kitchen, provisions store, the tin and copper stores, and the servants' quarters.

=== The East Wing and Ancillary Structures ===
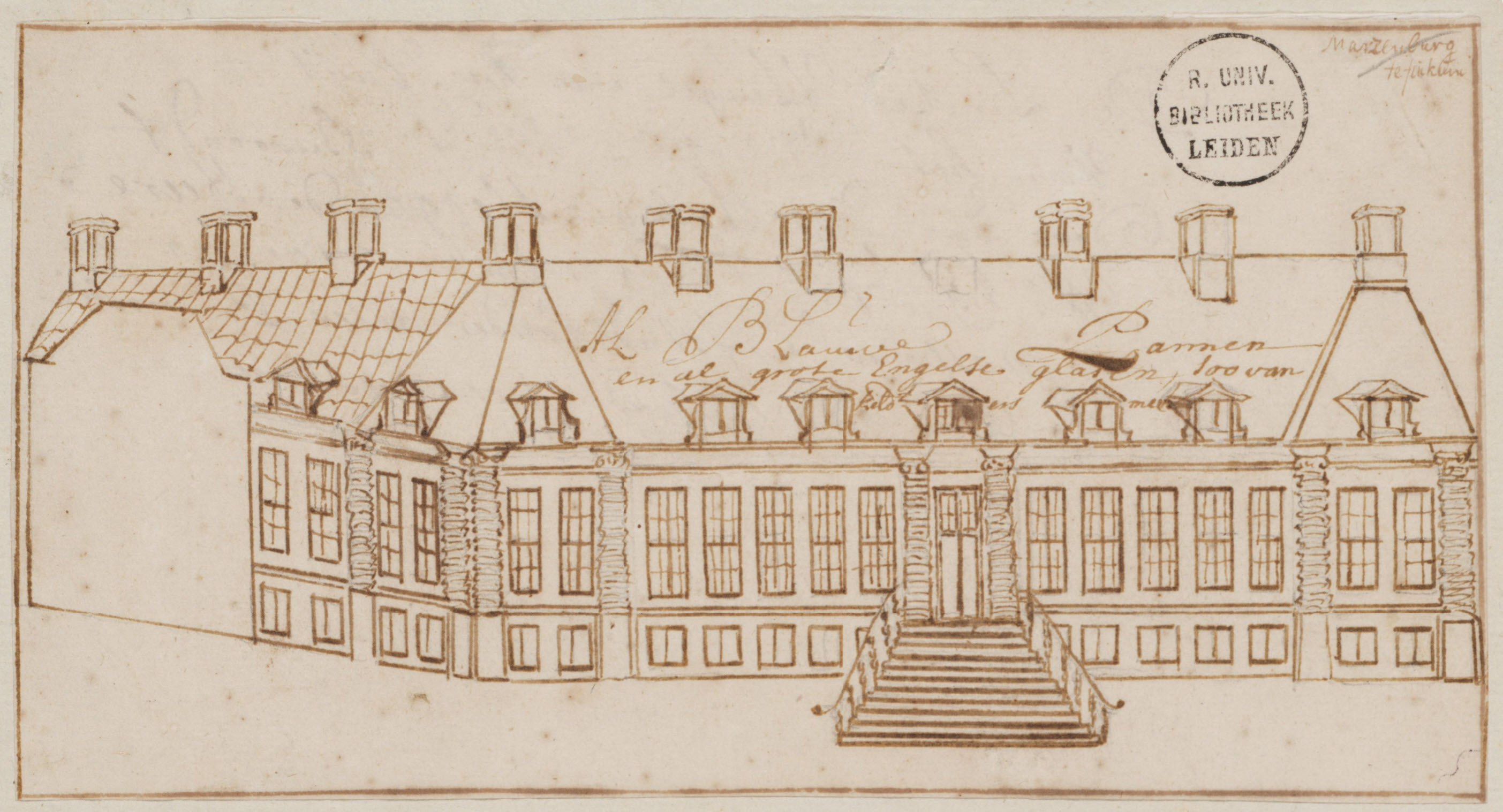
View of the east wing of Palace Oranjewoud by Jacobus Stellingwerf. The image shows its connection to the never-completed main building

The east wing incorporated a chapel and further accommodated the quarters of the senior court officials, namely the head steward and deputy steward. This wing likewise housed the master cook, the cook, the kitchen maids, the confectioner, the baker, the chambermaids, the laundry maids, footmen, pages, and halberdiers. There were separate dining halls provided for the nobility, the household servants, and the bodyguard respectively.

The estate was further staffed by a steward, a caretaker, a gardener, and a huntsman, all of whom were exempted from taxation on account of the estate's designation as a princely residence. A steward's residence, thoroughly rebuilt in 1722, likewise stood upon the estate; this subsequently developed into the Oranjestein estate.

In 1724, a hunting lodge was constructed on what was then designated the Jagersingel, presently the Bieruma Oostingweg. The structure survives to the present day and now forms part of the Princenhof estate. It was constructed for the huntsman Jean Baptiste Le Heux, whose responsibilities included the procurement of game — pheasant, partridge, red deer, and wild boar — for the princely table.

The original country house, Sickingastate, remained standing to the rear of the palace, serving thereafter as an ancillary structure housing the bakery, a wash-house, a linen loft, and a carpentry workshop.

== The Palace Garden ==
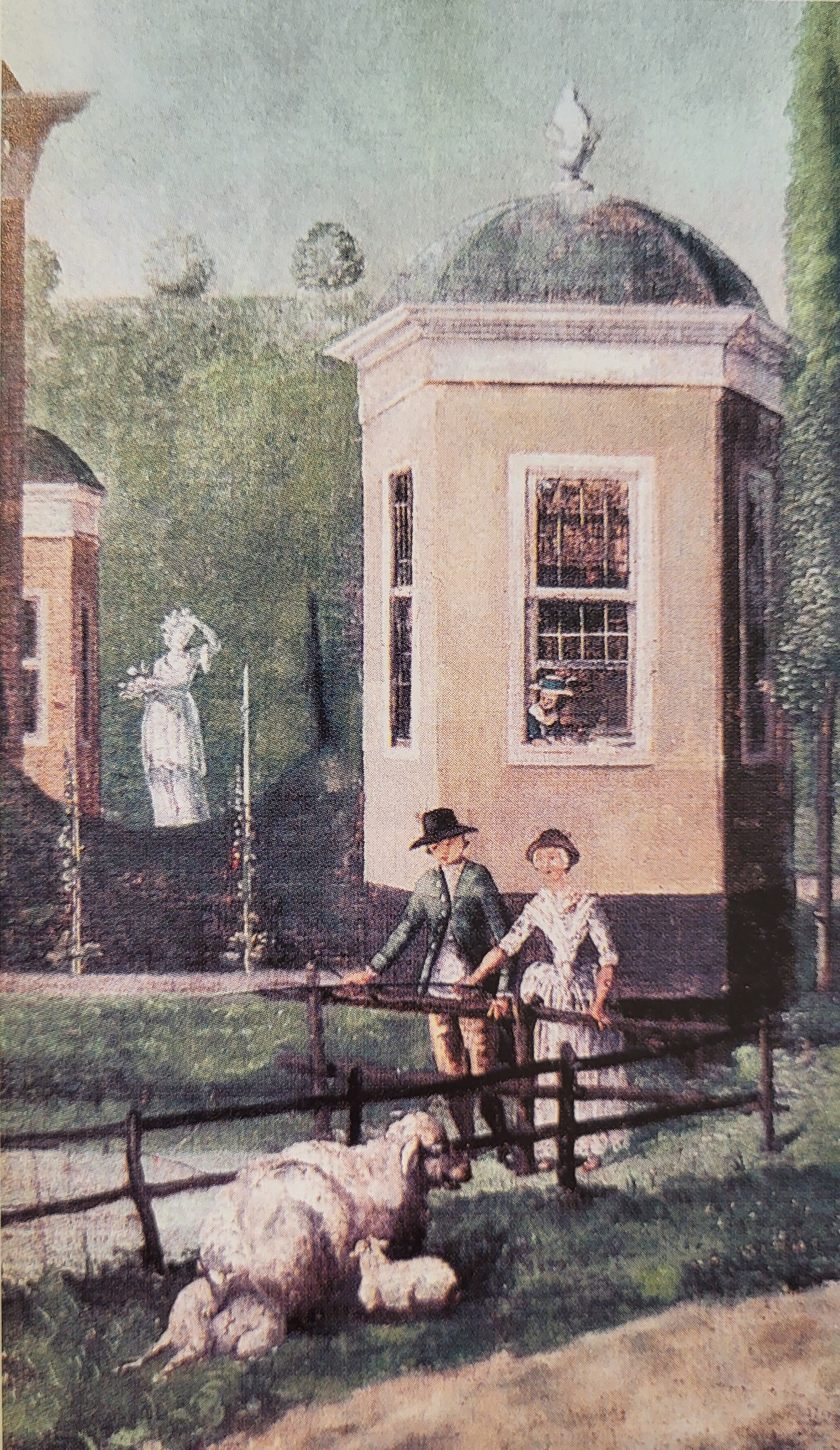
The picture is believed to depict a tea house in the palace garden at Oranjewoud

Following Princess Albertine Agnes's acquisition of the estate, work commenced without delay on the initial redesign of the gardens, for which purpose a number of soldiers were engaged and thousands of oak trees planted, extending from De Knipe to the Tjonger. The gardens were laid out in formal sections, giving rise, among other features, to what is presently designated De Overtuin. Lead statuary and iron urns were installed by way of ornamentation, interspersed with exotic specimens drawn from the estate's orangery, including pineapple plants.

Around 1700, lime trees were planted along the Lindelaan, and both De Overtuin and the court garden surrounding the palace were provided with a new moat, thereby establishing extended axial vistas, the principal of which — the Prinsenwijk — functioned as a "Grand Canal" in the manner of that at the Palace of Versailles, and measured some 3.4 kilometres in length in the princess's time; following the construction of the present-day manor house on the same site in the nineteenth century, the canal was effectively bisected, and only about half of its original length survives today. These modifications were additionally necessitated by the construction of the new palace itself, in which Daniel Marot likewise participated with respect to the garden design.

Upon completion of the palace's two wings, further development of the Baroque gardens proceeded, with elevated terraces constructed along the sides of the court garden to introduce variation in level. Within the area now designated De Overtuin, parterres de broderie were laid out, comprising intricately trimmed hedging with a central ornamental pond.

In 1747, a maze was constructed on the instructions of William IV, occupying the area presently known as the Tuimelaarsbos; mazes constituted a fashionable feature of the period, comparable examples existing at Hof te Dieren and Het Loo Palace. A star-shaped wood (sterrenbos) was likewise established adjacent to the maze during this period.

In 1794, the court garden was redesigned as a landscape garden under the direction of the garden architect Philip Willem Schonck, who retained the elevated terraces with their flanking oak avenues, together with the lime-tree walks along the northern side, adjacent to the Prinsenkom, while introducing solitary specimen trees to mark points of particular significance. The majority of the woodlands and parks established during this period survive to the present day, notwithstanding subsequent redesign of certain sections.

== Carolinenburg ==
In addition to Palace Oranjewoud, the House of Orange held ownership of the country house Carolinenburg, also situated at Oranjewoud. The property originated when Boldewijn Tamminga, master of the horse, acquired land there during the seventeenth century for the construction of a country residence. Following his death shortly thereafter, the property passed to Duco van Sickinga of Groningen, captain of the stadtholder's guard, who commissioned the construction of a country house upon the site; following his own death, the property was purchased by Albertine Agnes in 1684.

Some years subsequently, William IV had the property rebuilt as a small château for his daughter, Carolina of Orange-Nassau, from which circumstance it derived the designation Carolinenburg.

Carolinenburg comprised three storeys beneath a single roof, with a bel-étage of four rooms situated above the cellar and a further four rooms upon the first floor. Two wings extended from either side of the main structure, one serving as kitchen and coach house, the other allocated to the gardener and stable, with accommodation provided for several servants. The property was additionally furnished with a moat, an enclosing wall, and several gateways. Carolina subsequently married Karl Christian of Nassau-Weilburg, ruler of Nassau-Weilburg; several years after the couple took up residence at Kirchheimbolanden Palace in Germany, the small château of Carolinenburg was sold for demolition on 22 February 1774.

== Decline and the Present Estate ==
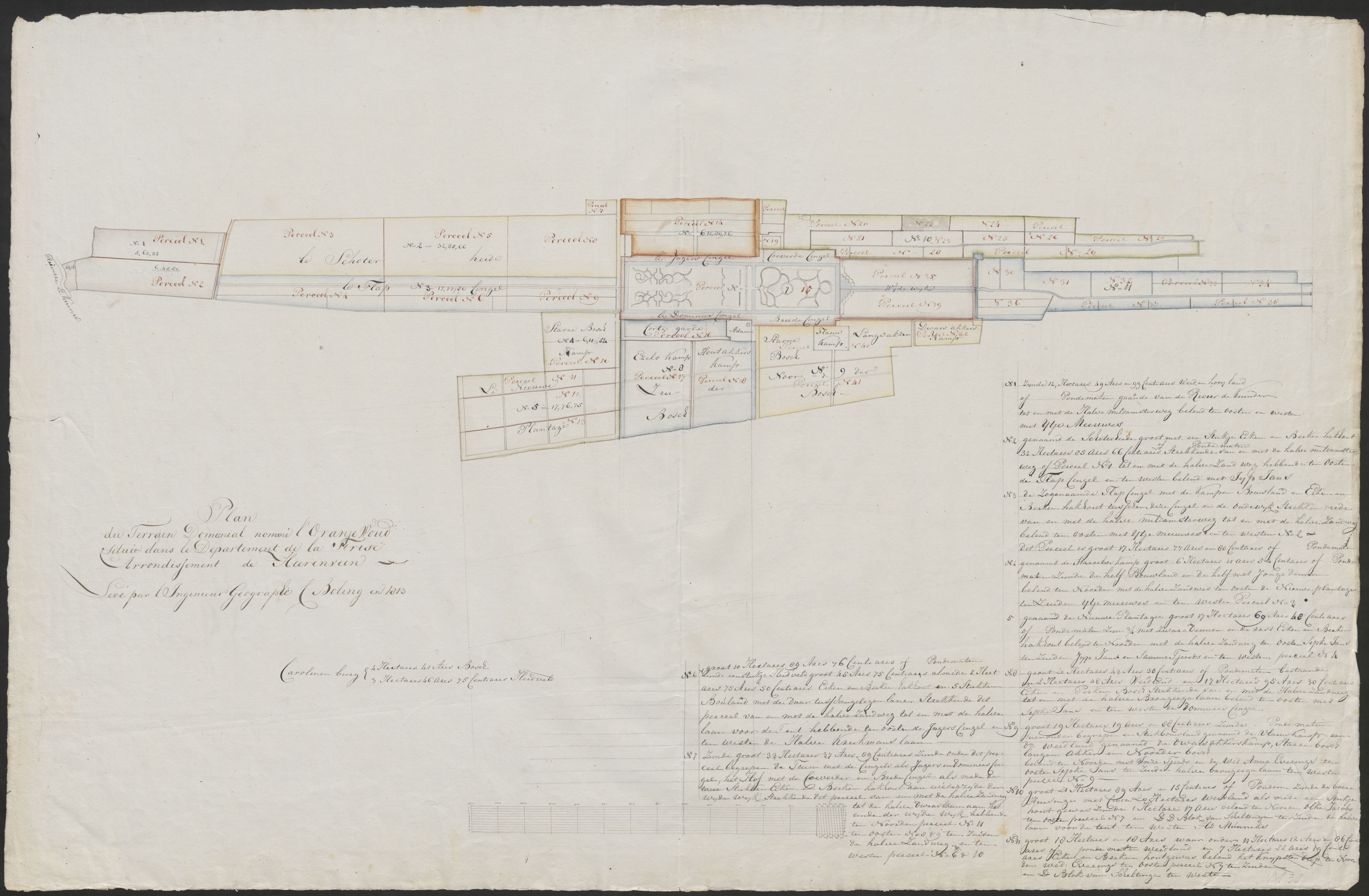
Plan drawn up in 1813 for the sale of the Oranjewoud estate. The palace was located at the left side of the right isle in lot number 15 (perceel 15)

On 17 September 1798, several years after William V had fled to England before the advancing French forces, an auction of the estate's contents was conducted. Items bearing the princely coat of arms, together with portraits and further items of value, were sold; paintings that had been affixed directly to the walls were, however, left in situ. The estate's valuable family possessions were transferred to Huis ten Bosch Palace in The Hague. Although the two wings continued to receive maintenance as late as 1802, the east wing, together with the original Sickingastate, the stables, and the greenhouses, was sold for demolition in 1803; the coach house remained standing somewhat longer. In 1805 the west wing was likewise sold for demolition.

In 1813, the minister of the Batavian Republic determined to sell the estate in order to improve the Republic's financial standing. The 219 hectares at Oranjewoud formerly belonging to the House of Orange, and by that time state property, were accordingly sold. Justinus Sjuck Gerrold Juckema van Burmania Rengers, a supporter of the House of Orange who had maintained contact with the exiled royal family during the French period, purchased the section of land upon which the palace had formerly stood, possibly with the intention of restoring it to the House of Orange upon their eventual return to the Netherlands. He subsequently disposed of the property, however, to several noble families, giving rise to the formation of new estates. The woods and gardens of the former estate were themselves sold off separately in 1822, after which several country houses were built upon the grounds, among them the house known simply as Oranjewoud.

== A Prospective Royal Residence? ==
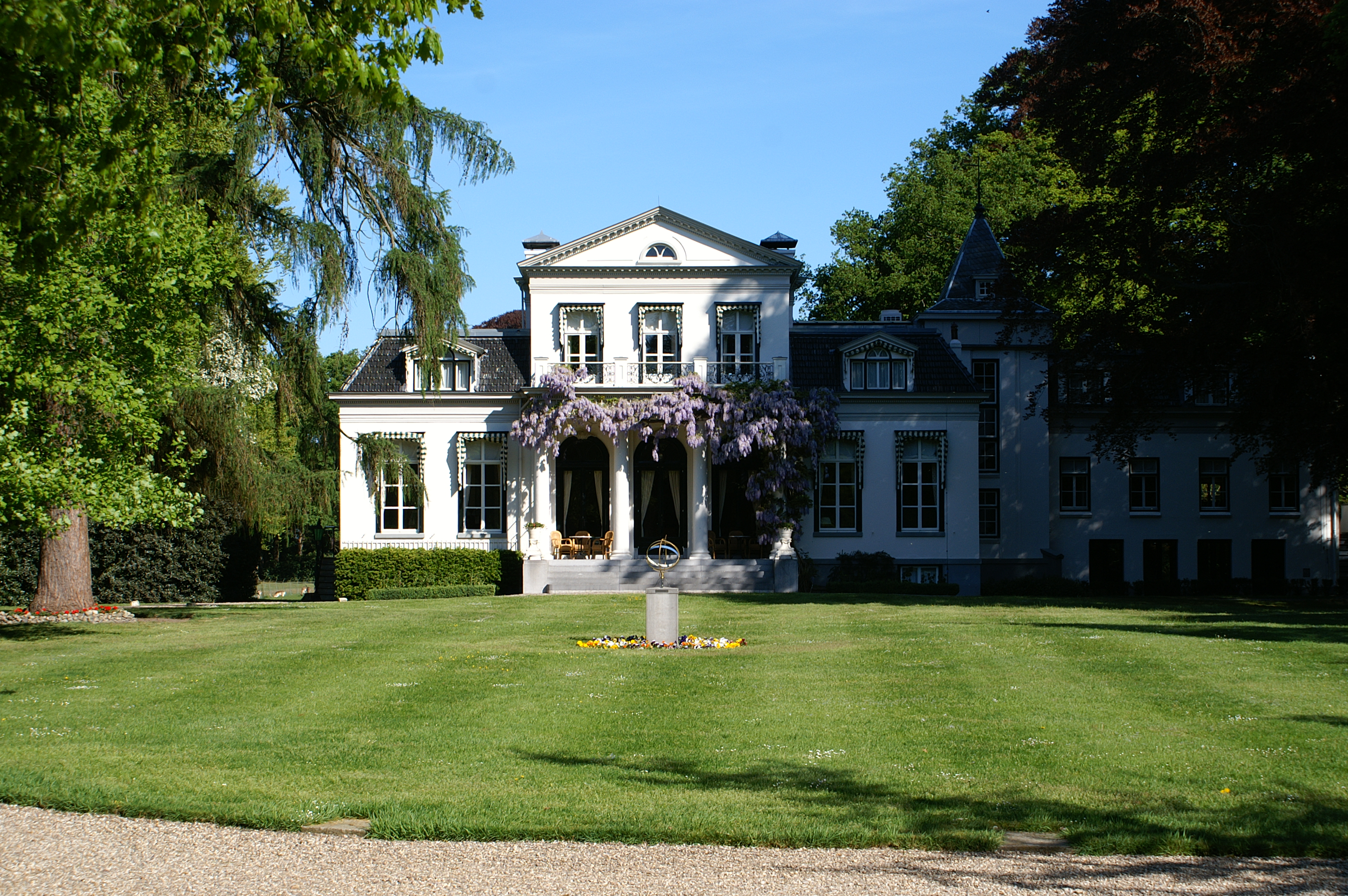
A new country house was erected on the former site of the palace in the 19th century, Landgoed Oranjewoud

Oranjewoud retained its appeal for the royal family even following the demolition of the palace and the subsequent construction of a new manor house upon the estate by Hans Willem de Blocq van Scheltinga, an associate of King William I of the Netherlands.

King William III of the Netherlands visited Oranjewoud on several occasions, on one such visit presenting a portrait of himself, and is recorded by tradition to have planted beech trees near the garden pavilion within De Overtuin, the garden situated opposite the manor house.

In 1894, the royal court gave consideration to the acquisition of the Oranjewoud estate on behalf of Queen Wilhelmina. Subsequently, around 1900, proposals arose within Friesland to present the estate to the queen as a gift from the nation; a committee was constituted for this purpose, although the proposal was ultimately not carried into effect.

In 1907, the estate was similarly considered for acquisition by Prince Henry, consort of Queen Wilhelmina, though ownership remained with the De Blocq van Scheltinga family.

In 1953, the estate was again under consideration for purchase, on this occasion by Princess Armgard, mother-in-law of Queen Juliana and grandmother of Princess Beatrix. Ownership ultimately passed to the Institute for Agricultural Cooperation, the estate presently being the property of the Stichting FB Oranjewoud (FB Oranjewoud Foundation) and not open to the public. The wider Oranjewoud estate is today a protected village and estate site, home to Museum Belvédère, a museum of modern and contemporary art, and the historic Parkhotel Tjaarda. Although the manor house itself remains privately owned and closed to visitors, De Overtuin, the garden that once faced the palace, is municipal property and freely open to the public.

Prince Henry, Queen Juliana, Prince Bernhard, Queen Beatrix, and Prince Claus each visited the estate, in certain instances on multiple occasions. In April 2004, a lime tree of the cultivar traditionally associated with the Dutch monarchy was planted within the museum park, upon the former site of the House of Orange-Nassau's palace, in commemoration of the birth of Princess Amalia, Crown Princess and eldest daughter of King Willem-Alexander.

== The palaces of the princesses of Orange ==
Albertine Agnes and her sisters each built a palace elsewhere in the Netherlands and Germany, every one of them named after the House of Orange:

- Oranienbaum Palace for Henriëtte Catharina
- Oranienburg Palace for Louise Henriëtte
- Oranienhof in Bad Kreuznach for Maria of Orange-Nassau
- Schloss Oranienstein for Albertine Agnes

== Literature ==
- Schellart, A.I.J.M. (1984). Huizen van Oranje Verblijven van de Oranjes en de Nassaus in Nederland (in Dutch). Rijswijk: Elmar. pp. 115–117. ISBN 90-6120402X.
- Elward, Ronald; Karstkarel, Peter (1990). Stinsen en States Adellijk wonen in Friesland (in Dutch). Drachten Leeuwarden: Friese Pers Boekerij bv. pp. 168–169. ISBN 978-9033002342.
- Karstkarel, Peter; Kingmans, Hugo (1994). Oranje Nassau & Friesland (in Dutch). Leeuwarden: Friese Pers Boekerij bv. pp. 68–75. ISBN 9033010623.
- Mulder-Radetzky, R.L.P.; De Vries, B.H. (1999). Geschiedenis van Oranjewoud – Van vorstelijk lustslot tot voorname buitenplaatsen (in Dutch). Alphen aan den Rijn: Canaletto. ISBN 90-6469-640-3.
- Groenveld, S; Huizinga, J.J.; Kuiper, Y.B. (2003). Nassau uit de schaduw van Oranje (in Dutch). Franeker: Uitgeverij van Wijnen. pp. 99–112. ISBN 9051942613.
- Jansen, Sunny (2022). De vrouw die Friesland redde (in Dutch). Uitgeverij Balans. ISBN 9789463822060.
- Hattink, Doris; Koldeweij, Eloy (2026). Daniel Marot Ontwerper voor paleizen, kastelen en buitenplaatsen (in Dutch). Zwolle: WBooks. ISBN 9789462587007.
