= Oranjewoud =

Oranjewoud It Oranjewâld
- Village
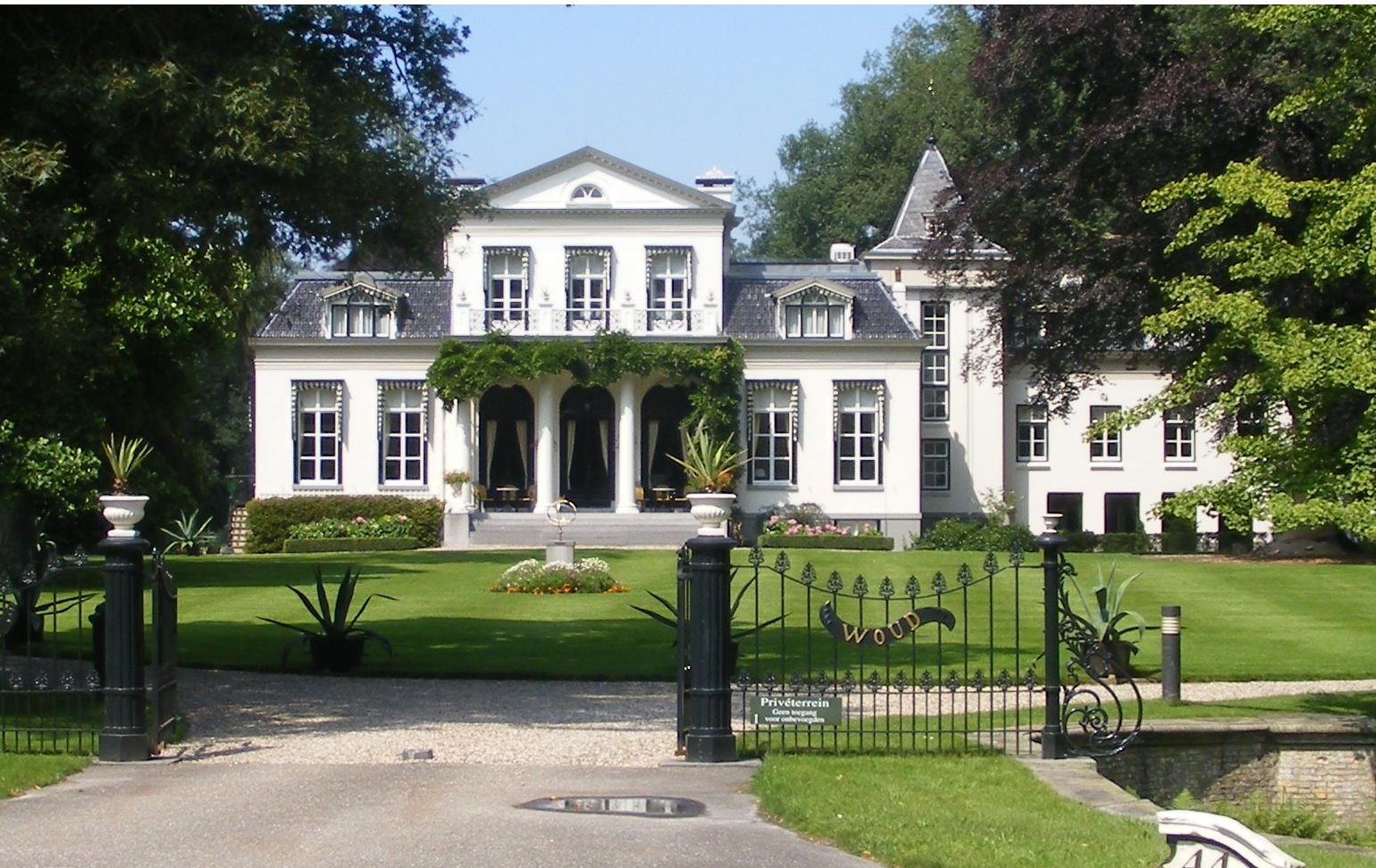
- The buitenplaats called Oranjewoud

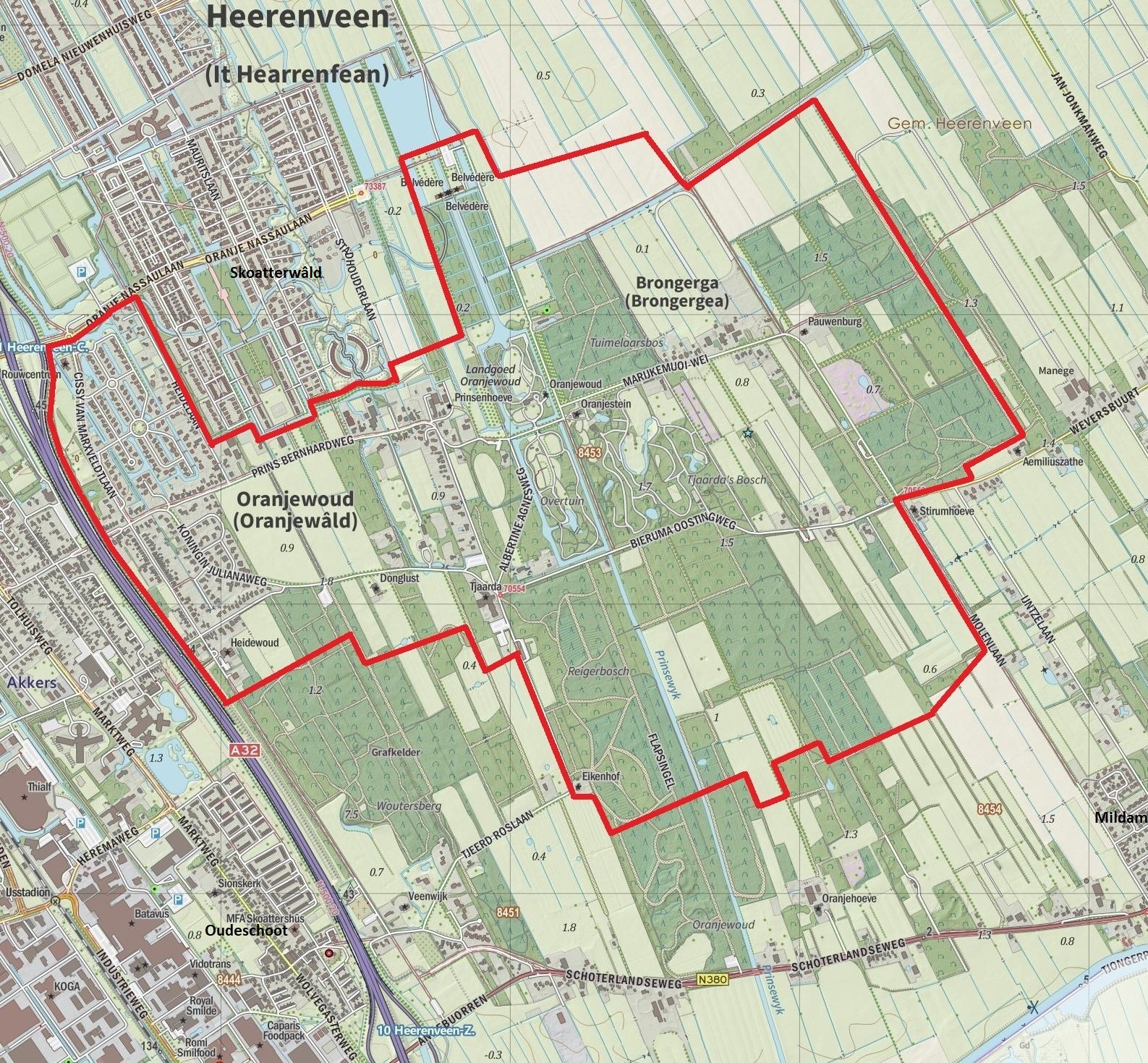
- Map of Oranjewoud

- Location in the Netherlands Oranjewoud (Netherlands)
- Country: Netherlands
- Province: Friesland
- Municipality: Heerenveen

Population (2017)
  - Total: 1,570
- Time zone: UTC+1 (CET)
  - Summer (DST): UTC+2 (CEST)
- Postal code: 8453
- Telephone area: 0513

Oranjewoud (West Frisian: Oranjewâld, literally "Orange Forest") is a small village in the Netherlands. It is located in the municipality of Heerenveen, Friesland. Oranjewoud had a population of 1570 in January 2017. It is known for Landgoed Oranjewoud.

== History ==
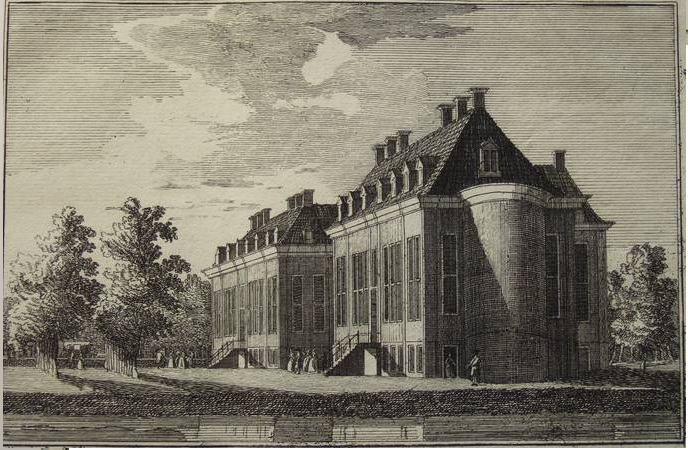
Oranjewoud Palace in 1765

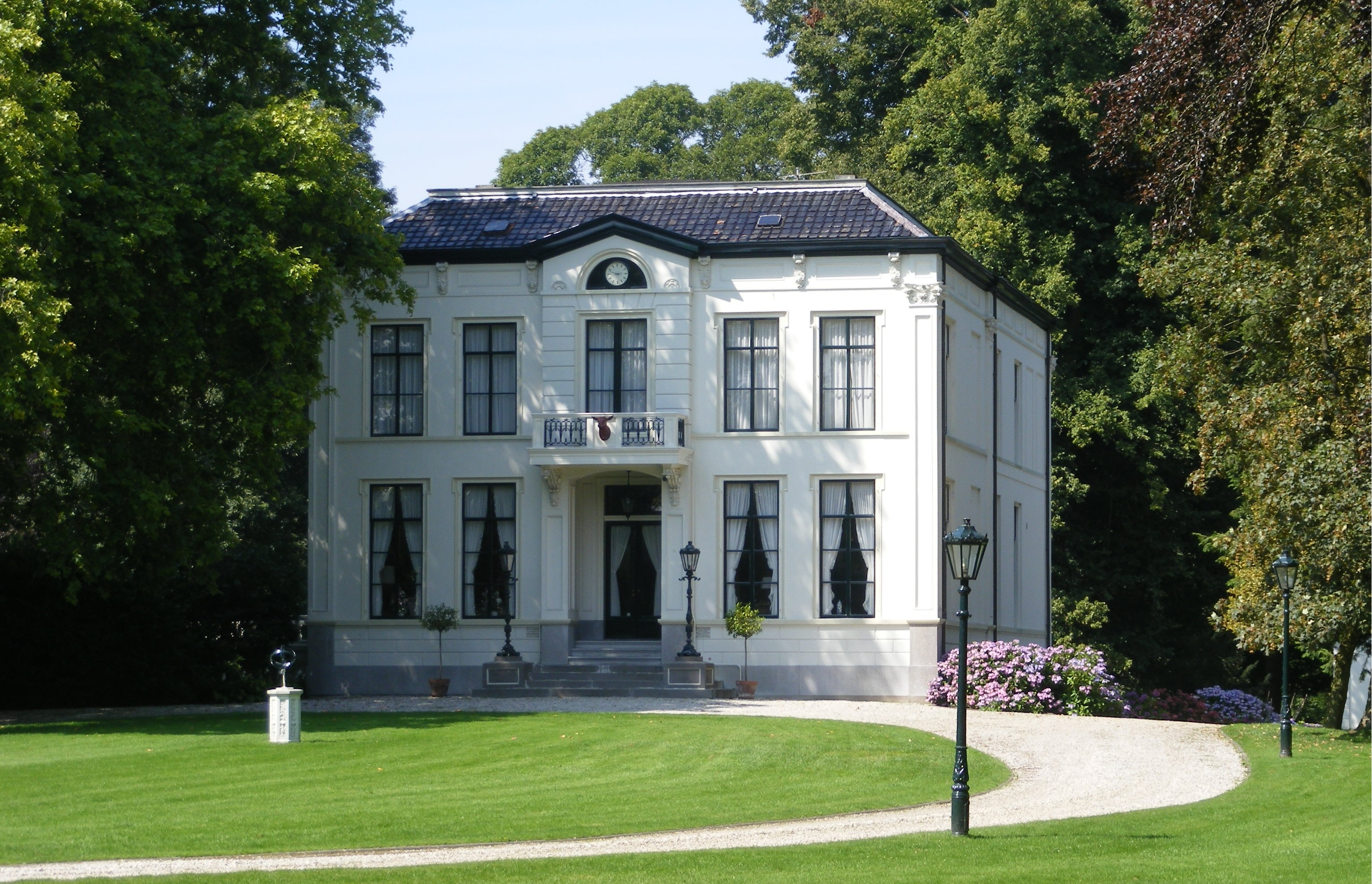
Klein Jagtlust Estate

The Palace of Oranjewoud was built for the royal family. In 1676 Countess Albertine Agnes of Nassau bought a country seat in the woods as a buitenplaats or summer residence. She was a Princess of Orange, and a widow of the Frisian Stadtholder Willem Frederik of Nassau-Dietz.

After her death, her daughter Princess Henriëtte Amalia of Anhalt-Dessau owned the palace. Her architect Daniel Marot, known for Het Loo Palace, designed a new palace. Two wings were built, but the central building was never built.

After Princess Henriëtte's death, John William Friso, Prince of Orange lived in the palace. He died very early, and his wife, Landgravine Marie Louise of Hesse-Kassel stayed at Oranjewoud after his death. Until 1747 the palace was often visited by the stadhouders. At that time William IV, Prince of Orange lived in Oranjewoud. William V, Prince of Orange visited the palace one last time in 1777.

Beside Oranjewoud Palace the royal family had another residence called Carolineburg. This was a small castle. Probably it was named after Princess Carolina of Orange-Nassau, who lived there. In 1774 it was demolished.

During the French Revolution the palace was demolished and the estate was sold to the Frisian nobility.

One of them was Hans Willem de Blocq van Scheltinga. In 1834 he built a new buitenplaats on the previously royal estate called Oranjewoud, after the Palace of Oranjewoud. This new buitenplaats was not longer owned by the royal family. It was occasionally visited by members of the royal family. King William I of the Netherlands, King William III of the Netherlands and Queen Juliana of the Netherlands all stayed at Oranjewoud.

Prince Henry of the Netherlands, Prince Bernhard of Lippe-Biesterfeld, Queen Beatrix of the Netherlands and Prince Claus of the Netherlands visited the buitenplaats as well. Later, the buitenplaats is owned by the Friesland Bank. now it is owned by the Bopper Fryslan Foundation.

Oranjestein is another buitenplaats in Oranjewoud. This was the former home of the royal steward. The millionaire Pieter Cats bought it and had it expanded. Some other estates in Oranjewoud are: Klein Jagtlust, Oranjehoeve, Princenhof and Klemburg. Destroyed estates are: Ontwijk, Brouwershave, Veenzigt and Paauwenburg.

== Overtuin ==
In 1953 this estate was sold in two parts by the family De Blocq van Scheltinga. One part was bought by the government. The Park was designed in French Baroque style. Now the park is owned by the government and is free to the public. Literally Overtuin means 'the garden in front of'.

== Museum Belvédère ==
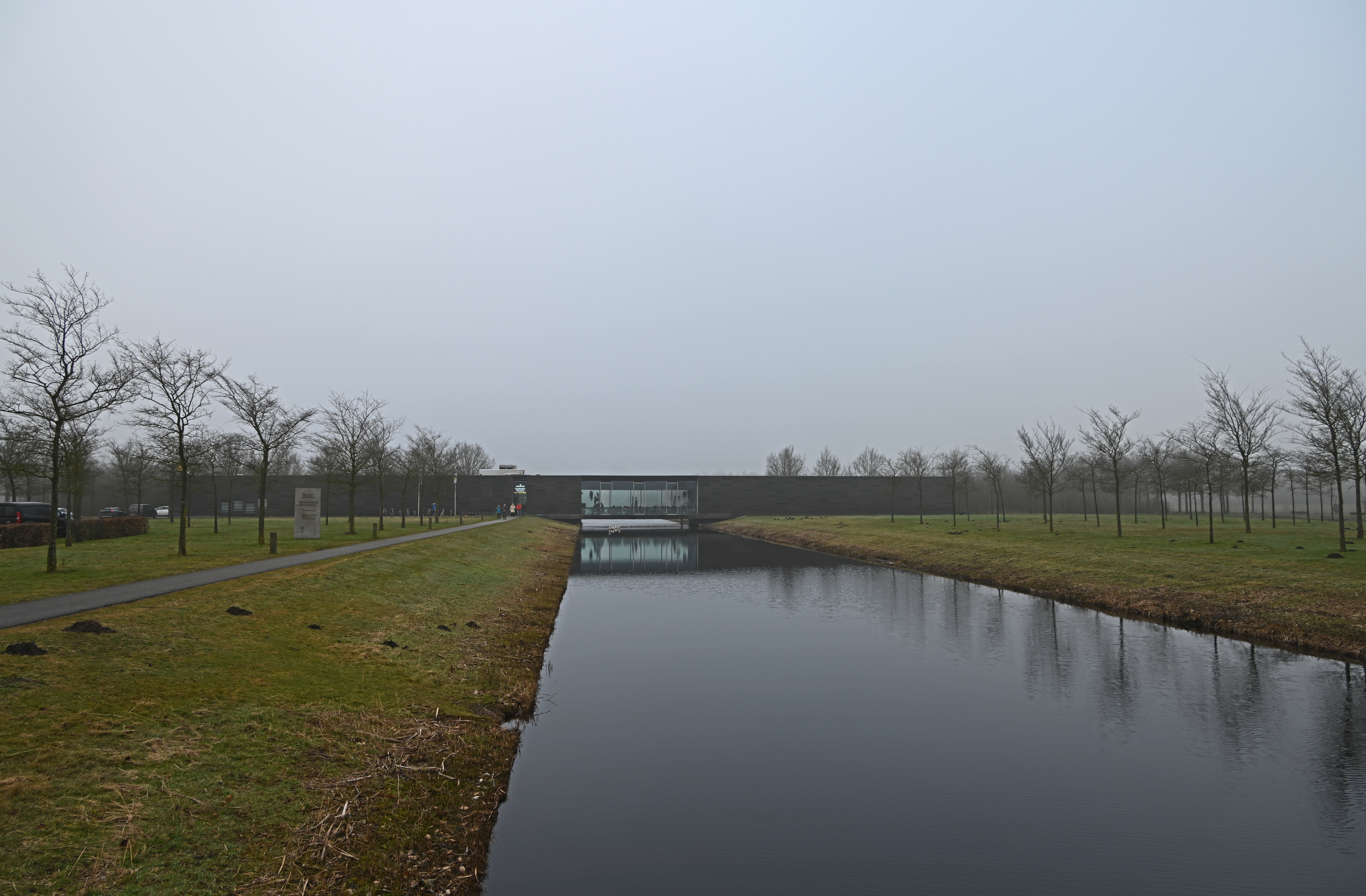
Museum Belvédère

Belvédère is a museum of contemporary and modern art. The building was designed by Eerde Schippers. It is 104 metres (341 ft) long and 13 metres (43 ft) wide. The building was the winner of the contest BNA Building of the Year 2006. The museum is named after the Belvedere in the Park area Oranjewoud. The collection consists mainly of works by Frisian artists, like Jan Mankes, Thijs Rinsema, Tames Oud, Gerrit Benner, Boele Bregman, William Althuis and Sjoerd de Vries. It was opened on 24 November 2004 by Queen Beatrix.

== Famous residents of Oranjewoud ==
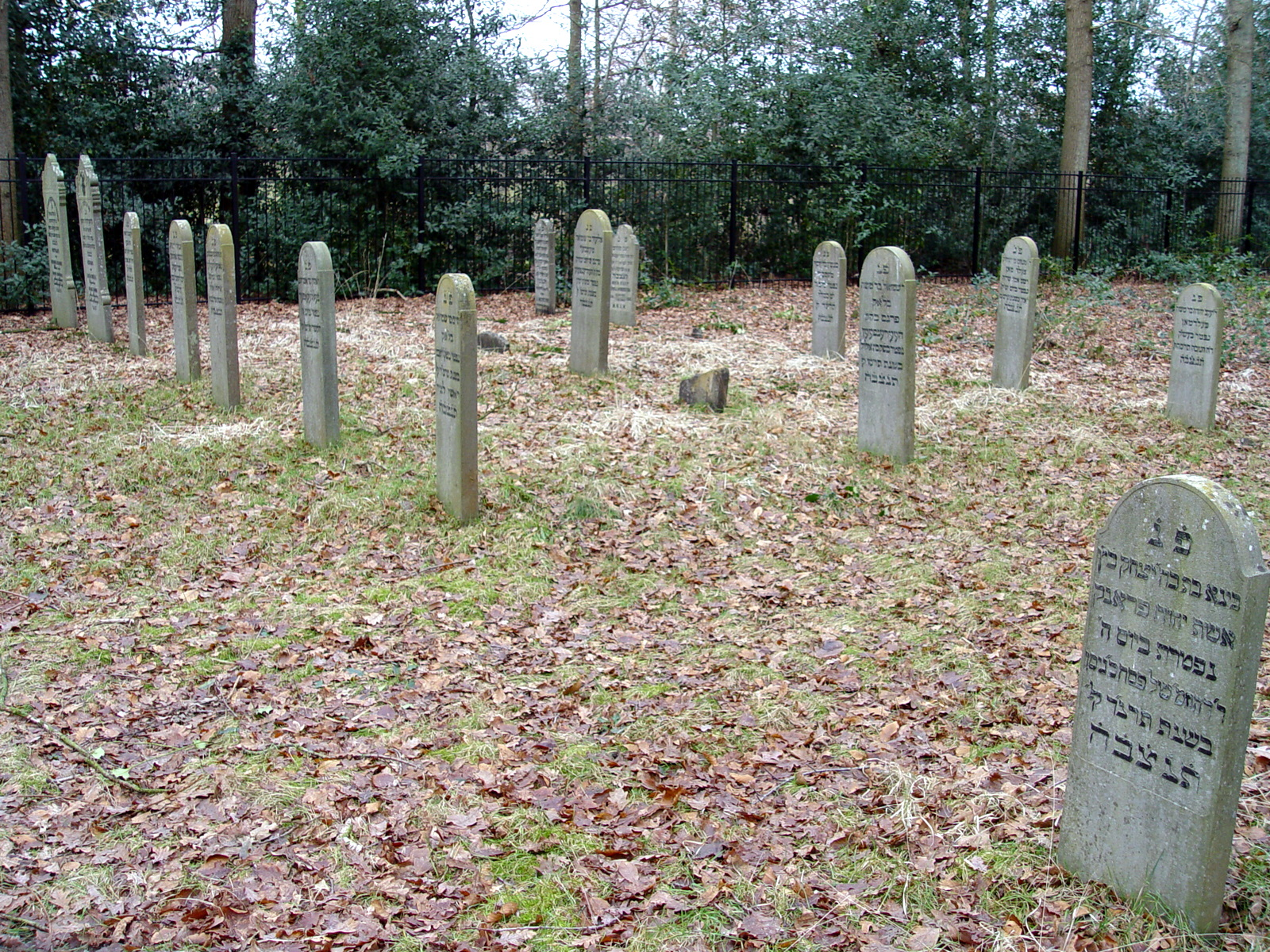
Jewish cemetery

- Cissy van Marxveldt was born in Oranjewoud in 1889.

== Population ==
1954	1959	1964	1969	1973	2005	2006	2007	2008	2009	2010
569	541	595	926	862	1062	1062	1041	1043	1045	1042
