= Albertine Agnes of Nassau =

Regent of Friesland, Groningen and Drenthe (1664–1679)

Countess Albertine Agnes of Nassau
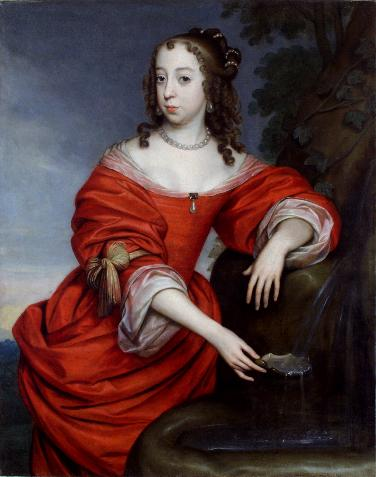
- Born: 9 April 1634; The Hague
- Died: 26 May 1696 (aged 62); Oranjewoud Palace
- Burial: Grote or Jacobijnerkerk in Leeuwarden
- Spouse: William Frederick, Prince of Nassau-Dietz (m. 1652; died 1664)
- Issue: Amalie, Duchess of Nassau-Dietz; Henry Casimir II, Prince of Nassau-Dietz; Wilhelmina Sophia Hedwig
- House: Orange-Nassau
- Father: Frederick Henry, Prince of Orange
- Mother: Amalia of Solms-Braunfels

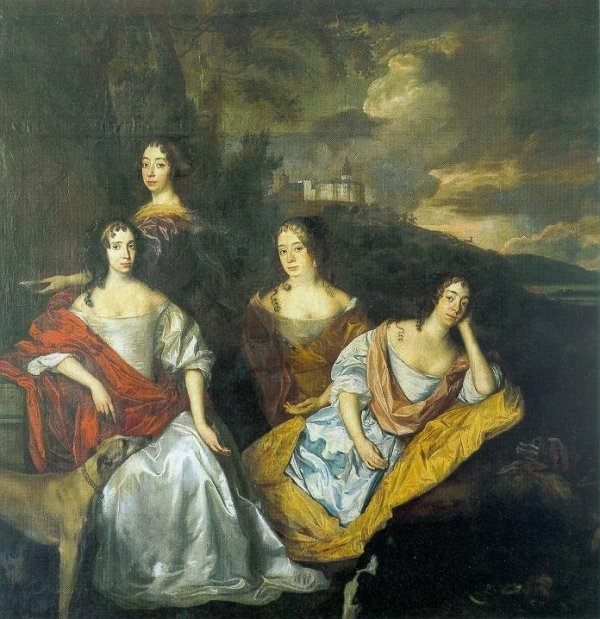
Albertine Agnes and her sisters

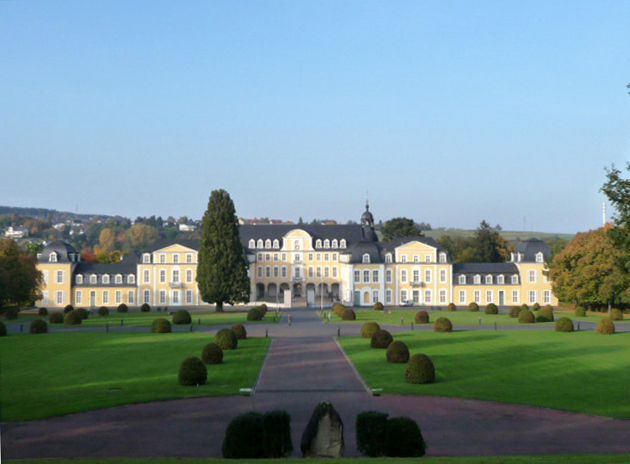
Oranienstein Palace, Diez

Albertine Agnes of Nassau (9 April 1634 – 26 May 1696) was the regent of Friesland, Groningen and Drenthe during the minority of her son Henry Casimir II, Count of Nassau-Dietz, between 1664 and 1679. She was the sixth child and fifth daughter of stadtholder Frederick Henry, Prince of Orange, and Amalia of Solms-Braunfels.

== Life ==
Albertine Agnes was born in The Hague and was the sixth of nine children born to her parents. Some of her siblings died in childhood. Albertine and four other siblings lived to adulthood. Her surviving siblings were: William II, Prince of Orange, Luise Henriette of Nassau, Henriette Catherine of Nassau and Mary of Nassau.

In 1652 she married her second-cousin, William Frederick, Prince of Nassau-Dietz.

=== Regency ===
After the death of her husband in 1664, she became regent for her son in Friesland, Groningen and Drenthe. In 1665, both England and the bishopric of Münster declared war on the Netherlands. Because most of the money for defence had been used for the fleet, the army had been neglected. When Groningen was under siege, Albertine Agnes hastened to the city to give moral support. Pressure by King Louis XIV of France, then an ally, forced the forces of her enemies retreated, but six years later the Netherlands were attacked from the south, by the French under Louis XIV and from the north by the bishop of Münster and archbishop of Cologne. She organised defence and kept morale high.

In 1676 Albertine Agnes bought a country seat in Oranjewoud and named it the Palace of Oranjewoud. It was here that she died in 1696. She also had Schloss Oranienstein built from 1672 as her new residence at Diez.

== Issue ==
She and William Frederick had three children:

- Amalie of Nassau-Dietz (1655-1695), married to John William III, Duke of Saxe-Eisenach
- Henry Casimir II, Count of Nassau-Dietz (1657-1696), married to Henriëtte Amalia of Anhalt-Dessau
- Wilhelmina Sophia Hedwig (1664–1667)

== Ancestors ==
Albertine Agnes's ancestors in three generations
Albertine Agnes of Nassau	Father: Frederick Henry, Prince of Orange	Paternal Grandfather: William the Silent	Paternal Great-grandfather: William I, Count of Nassau-Siegen
Albertine Agnes of Nassau	Father: Frederick Henry, Prince of Orange	Paternal Grandfather: William the Silent	Paternal Great-grandmother: Juliana of Stolberg
Albertine Agnes of Nassau	Father: Frederick Henry, Prince of Orange	Paternal Grandmother: Louise de Coligny	Paternal Great-grandfather: Gaspard de Coligny
Albertine Agnes of Nassau	Father: Frederick Henry, Prince of Orange	Paternal Grandmother: Louise de Coligny	Paternal Great-grandmother: Charlotte de Laval
Albertine Agnes of Nassau	Mother: Amalia of Solms-Braunfels	Maternal Grandfather: John Albert I, Count of Solms-Braunfels	Maternal Great-grandfather: Conrad, Count of Solms-Braunfels
Albertine Agnes of Nassau	Mother: Amalia of Solms-Braunfels	Maternal Grandfather: John Albert I, Count of Solms-Braunfels	Maternal Great-grandmother: Elisabeth of Nassau-Dillenburg
Albertine Agnes of Nassau	Mother: Amalia of Solms-Braunfels	Maternal Grandmother: Agnes of Sayn-Wittgenstein	Maternal Great-grandfather: Louis I, Count of Sayn-Wittgenstein
Albertine Agnes of Nassau	Mother: Amalia of Solms-Braunfels	Maternal Grandmother: Agnes of Sayn-Wittgenstein	Maternal Great-grandmother: Elisabeth of Solms-Laubach
