= Daniel Marot =

Dutch architect

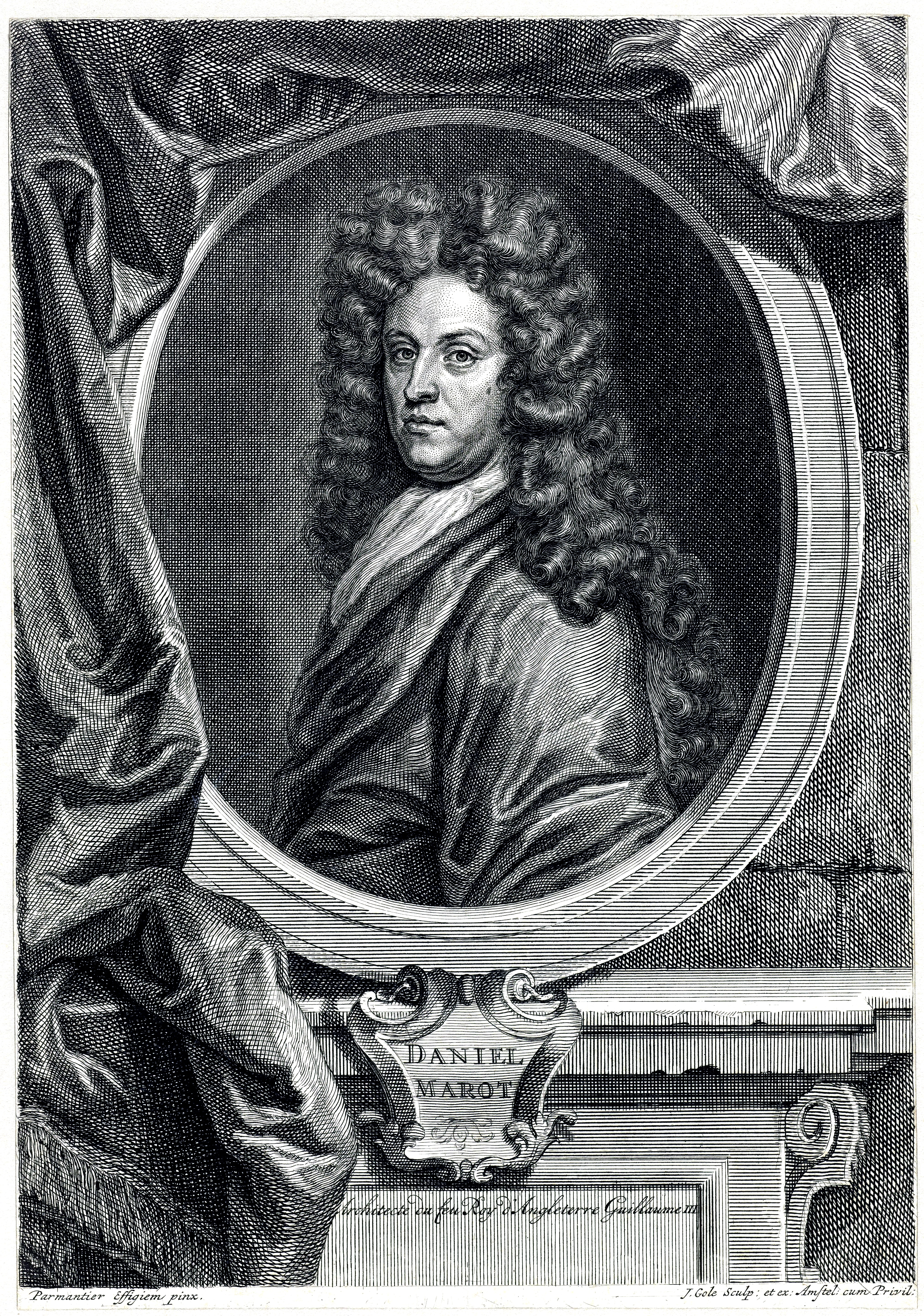
Daniël Marot (1661–1752)

Daniel Marot or Daniel Marot the Elder (English: /mɑːˈroʊ/ mah-ROH, French: [danjɛl maʁo]; 1661–1752) was a French-born Dutch architect, furniture designer and engraver at the forefront of the classicizing Late Baroque Louis XIV style. He worked for a long time in England and the Dutch Republic, where he was naturalised in 1709.

== Life ==
Born in Paris, he was a pupil of Jean Le Pautre and the son of Jean Marot, who was also an architect and engraver. Marot was working independently as an engraver from an early age, making engravings of designs by Jean Bérain, one of Louis XIV's official designers at the Manufacture des Gobelins, where far more than tapestry was being produced. The family were Huguenots and were part of the wave of émigrés who left France in the year of the Edict of Fontainebleau and Revocation of the Edict of Nantes (1685) to settle in Holland. Daniel Marot brought the fully developed court style of Louis XIV to Holland, and later to London. In the end, the English style which is loosely called "William and Mary" owed much to his manner.

In the Dutch Republic, Marot was employed by the Stadthouder, who later became William III of England; in particular, he is associated with designing interiors in the palace of Het Loo, from 1684 on. Though his name cannot be attached to any English building (and he does not have an entry in Howard Colvin's exhaustive Dictionary of British Architects) we know from his own engraving that he designed the great hall of audience for the States-General at the Hague. He also decorated many Dutch country-houses, introducing the “salon” and popularizing ornamented ceilings in The United Provinces/ Netherlands.

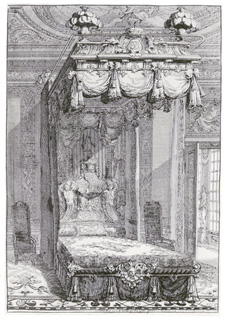
State bed, designed by Daniel Marot, engraving, ca 1702

In 1694, he traveled with William to London, where he was appointed one of his architects and Master of Works. In England his activities appear to have been concentrated at Hampton Court Palace, where he designed the garden parterres, which were swept away in the following generation and have been restored at the end of the 20th century. His designs for the Great Fountain Garden survive. Much of the furniture, especially the mirrors, guéridons and state beds, in the new State Rooms readied for William at Hampton Court bears unmistakable traces of his authorship; the tall and monumental embroidered state beds, with their plumes of ostrich feathers, their elaborate valances and cantonnieres agree very closely with his later published designs (illustration, right).

After William's death Marot returned to Holland where he lived at the Noordeinde 164 in The Hague from 1720 until his death in 1752. The house with his salon, kitchen, hallway and possibly some of his ceilings still exists.

We owe much of our knowledge of his work to the folio volume of his furniture designs published at Amsterdam in 1712. Not surprisingly the designs show strong French and Dutch influences; what reads as their "English" look is more probably the result of Marot's court style on other London designers.

Marot was a nephew of Pierre Gole as he was the son of Gole's sister-in-law. He married Gole's niece.

== Engravings ==
In his engraved designs, Marot's range was extraordinarily wide. He designed practically every detail in the internal ornamentation of the house: carved chimneypieces, plaster ceilings, panels for walls, girandoles and wall brackets, and side tables with their pairs of tall stands. He also designed gold and silver plate. The craze for collecting china which was at its height in his time is illustrated in his lavish designs for receptacles for porcelain: in one of his plates there are more than 300 pieces of china on the chimneypiece alone.

== Selected works ==
- Side wings of Huis ten Bosch
- Coldenhove Castle
- Kneuterdijk Palace
- Reconstruction of Schloss Oranienstein
- Palace of Oranjewoud

== External reference ==
Media related to Daniel Marot at Wikimedia Commons

- Life and Design Examples
- Das Ornamentwerk des Daniel Marot: in 264 Lichtdrucken nachgebildet, 1892 at the University of Heidelberg.
