= Principality of Nassau-Orange-Fulda =

State of the Holy Roman Empire (1803–1806)

Coordinates: 50.554°N 9.67175°E

Principality of Nassau-Orange-Fulda Fürstentum Nassau-Oranien-Fulda
- 1803–1806
- Coat of arms
- Status: Principality
- Capital: Fulda
- Prince
  - 25 February 1803–27 October 1806: Prince Willem Frederik
- Historical era: Napoleonic Wars
  - Established: 1803
  - Abolition of the Holy Roman Empire: 1806
Preceded by
Coat of arms of Diocese of Fulda	Fulda monastery
	Corvey Abbey
	Dortmund
	Weingarten Abbey
	Provostry of St. Gerold
	Deanery of Bandern
	Dietkirchen Abbey
Succeeded by
Kingdom of Westphalia
Kingdom of Württemberg
Grand Duchy of Berg
Grand Duchy of Frankfurt
Duchy of Nassau

Nassau-Orange-Fulda (sometimes also named Fulda and Corvey) was a short-lived principality of the Holy Roman Empire from 1803 to 1806. It was created for William Frederick, the son and heir of William V, Prince of Orange, the ousted stadtholder of the abolished Dutch Republic after the Batavian Revolution of 1795.

== Background ==
The Princely Abbey of Fulda was elevated to Prince-Bishopric in 1752. In January 1795, stadtholder William V lost all his possessions in the Low Countries because of the rise of the Batavian Republic, a client state of the French Republic. During the Batavian Revolution in Amsterdam on 18 January 1795, he fled to England, and issued the Kew Letters in February 1795, ordering all officials in the Dutch colonies outside Europe to treat the British as their new overlords. In August 1799, he and his son William Frederick issued a proclamation in support of the Anglo-Russian invasion of Holland. After this failure, his son convinced him to issue the Oranienstein Letters in December 1801, recognising the Batavian Republic, in order to receive compensation from Napoleon for the possessions he lost in 1795.

== History ==
On 23 May 1802, the French First Republic and the Kingdom of Prussia concluded a treaty in which Fulda and some other areas were promised to the Prince of Orange as compensation for the loss of his domains in the Low Countries. Willem V refused at first, but later accepted the offer in favour for his son William Frederick to become the ruler of the new formed principality, plus five million gulden, in exchange for the renunciation of their hereditary stadtholderate in the abolished Dutch Republic. On 22 October Prussian troops occupied the Princely Abbey of Fulda to secure the interests of the prince, and on 6 December, William Frederick held his entry in Fulda. The Prince-Bishopric was secularised and handed to him as a hereditary possession. The Reichsdeputationshauptschluss resolution on 25 February 1803, legalized the redistribution of the territories. According to section 12 of this resolution the following areas were transferred to the rule of the new Prince of Nassau-Orange-Fulda: (Note: "Dem Fürsten von Nassau-Dillenburg, zur Entschädigung für die Statthalterschaft, und seine Domänen in Holland und Belgien: die Bisthümer Fulda und Corvey; die Reichsstadt Dortmund; die Abtey Weingarten, die Abteyen und Probsteyen Hofen, St. Gerold im Weingartischen, Bandern im Lichtensteinischen Gebiete, Dietkirchen im Nassauischen, so wie alle Kapitel, Abteyen, [514] Probsteyen und Klöster in den zugetheilten Landen; unter der Bedingung, den bestehenden, und schon früher von Frankreich anerkannten, Ansprüchen auf einige Erbschaften, welche im Laufe des letzten Jahrhunderts mit dem Nassau-Dillenburgischen Majorate vereiniget worden sind, Genüge zu thun.")

- Princely Abbey of Fulda
- Princely Abbey of Corvey
- Free Imperial City of Dortmund
- Weingarten Abbey and the priorate Hofen
- Provostry of St. Gerold (in Vorarlberg, 1804 sold to Austria)
- Deanery of Bandern (in Liechtenstein, 1804 sold to Austria)
- Dietkirchen Abbey (Nassau)

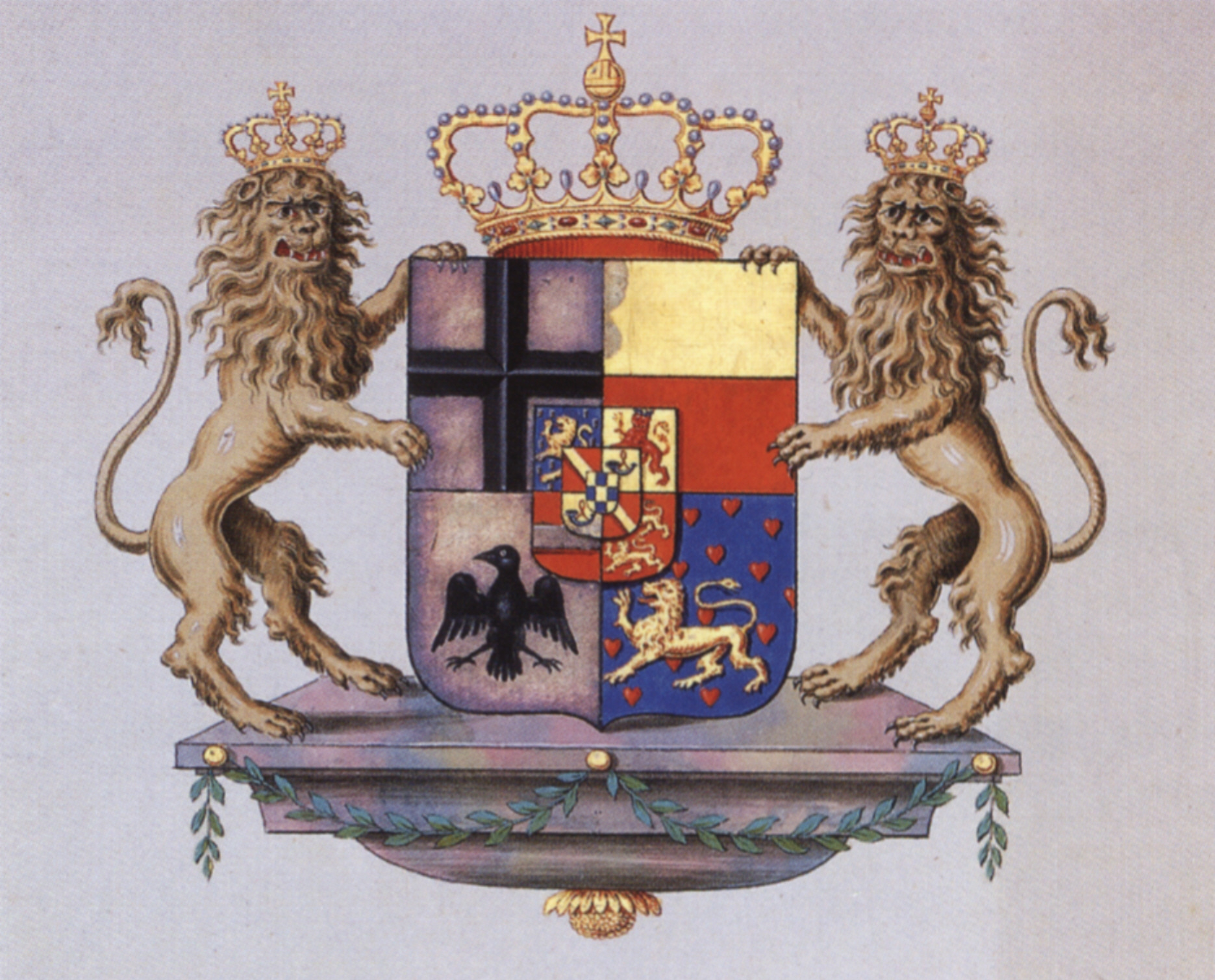
Coat of arms with supporters

The areas were reorganised into the four divisions "Principality of Fulda", "Principality of Corvey", "County of Dortmund" and "Lordship of Weingarten". The arms of the principality included the coats of arms of these areas (with the inescutcheon being the arms of the Prince of Orange-Nassau).

With the death of his father William V on 9 April 1806, William Frederick also inherited all the Nassau core territories. However, a few months later, he refused to join Napoleon's formation of the Confederation of the Rhine, which ultimately led to Napoleon taking both Nassau and Fulda away from him. On 12 July 1806, William Frederick lost the Lordship of Weingarten and the Nassau territories. By the German Mediatisation, the Lordship of Weingarten was incorporated into the Kingdom of Württemberg and the Nassau core territories into the Grand Duchy of Berg and the Duchy of Nassau.

After Napoleon defeated Prussia in the Battle of Jena–Auerstedt (14 October 1806), the Prince of Orange lost his remaining possessions (including the mediated ones). Fulda was occupied by French troops on 27 October 1806. William Frederick would subsequently enter Prussian and later Austrian military service to fight against Napoleon.

== Legacy ==
Fulda remained under French rule until 19 May 1810, when it was incorporated into the Grand Duchy of Frankfurt. Corvey was incorporated into the Kingdom of Westphalia on 7 December 1807 and Dortmund into the Grand Duchy of Berg on 1 March 1808. With the defeat of the French in 1813, the Prince of Orange regained his possessions in the Low Countries but lost his claims to the principality Nassau-Orange-Fulda. By the final act of the Congress of Vienna in 1815, it was decided not to restore the Principality of Nassau-Orange-Fulda; Corvey and Dortmund became part of the Kingdom of Prussia, and Fulda was divided between the Electorate of Hesse (Hesse-Cassel), the (Grand) Duchy of Saxe-Weimar-Eisenach, and the Kingdom of Bavaria. The episcopal seat was restored in 1821. In 1866, Fulda was annexed by Prussia.

== See also ==
- Principality of Orange
- Principality of Orange-Nassau
- House of Orange-Nassau
