= Dietkirchen =

- Borough of Limburg an der Lahn
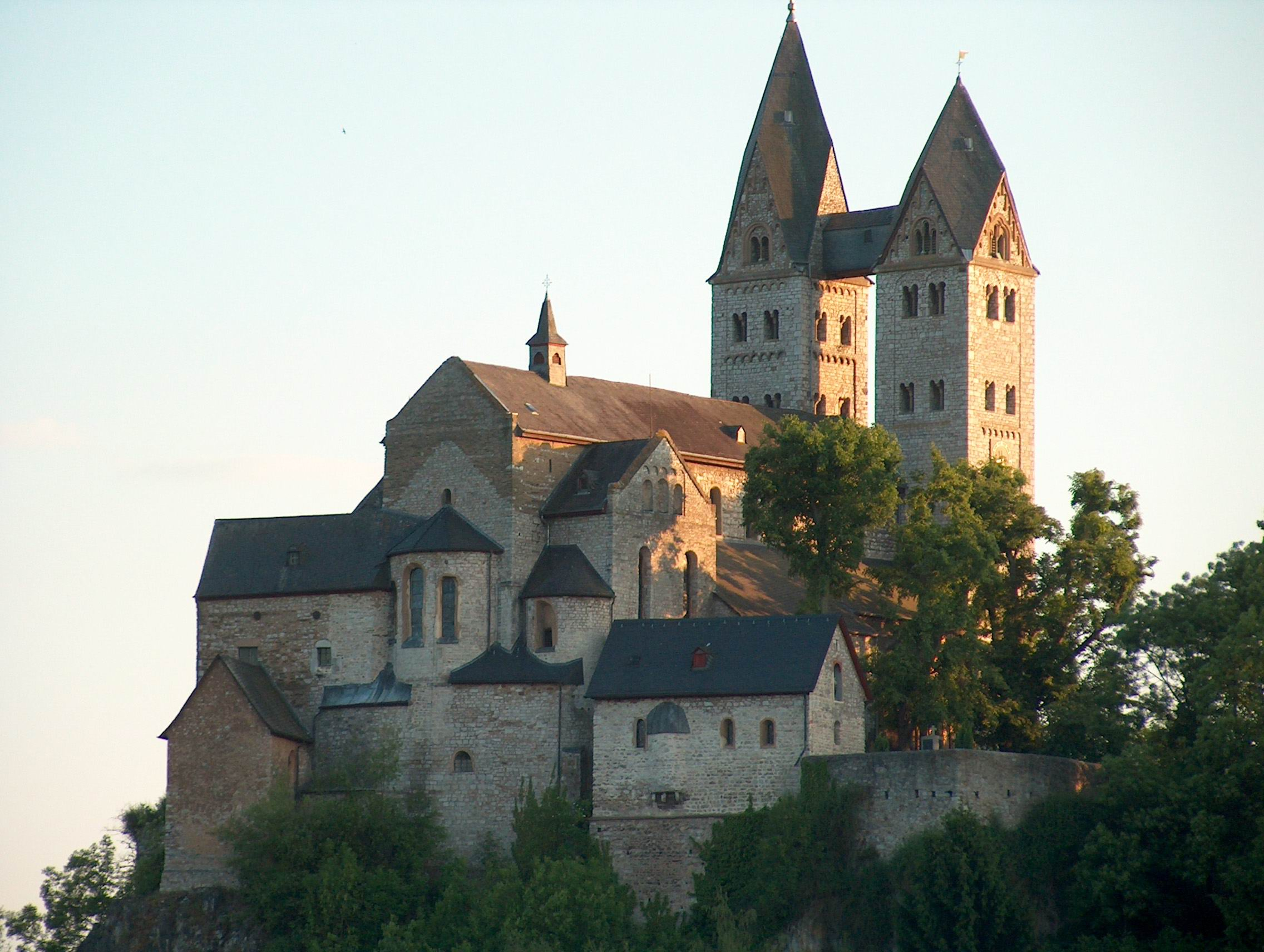
- St. Lubentius in Dietkirchen

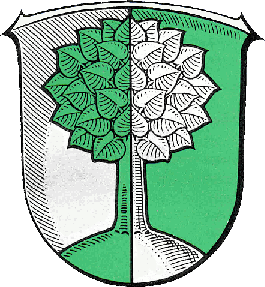
- Coat of arms

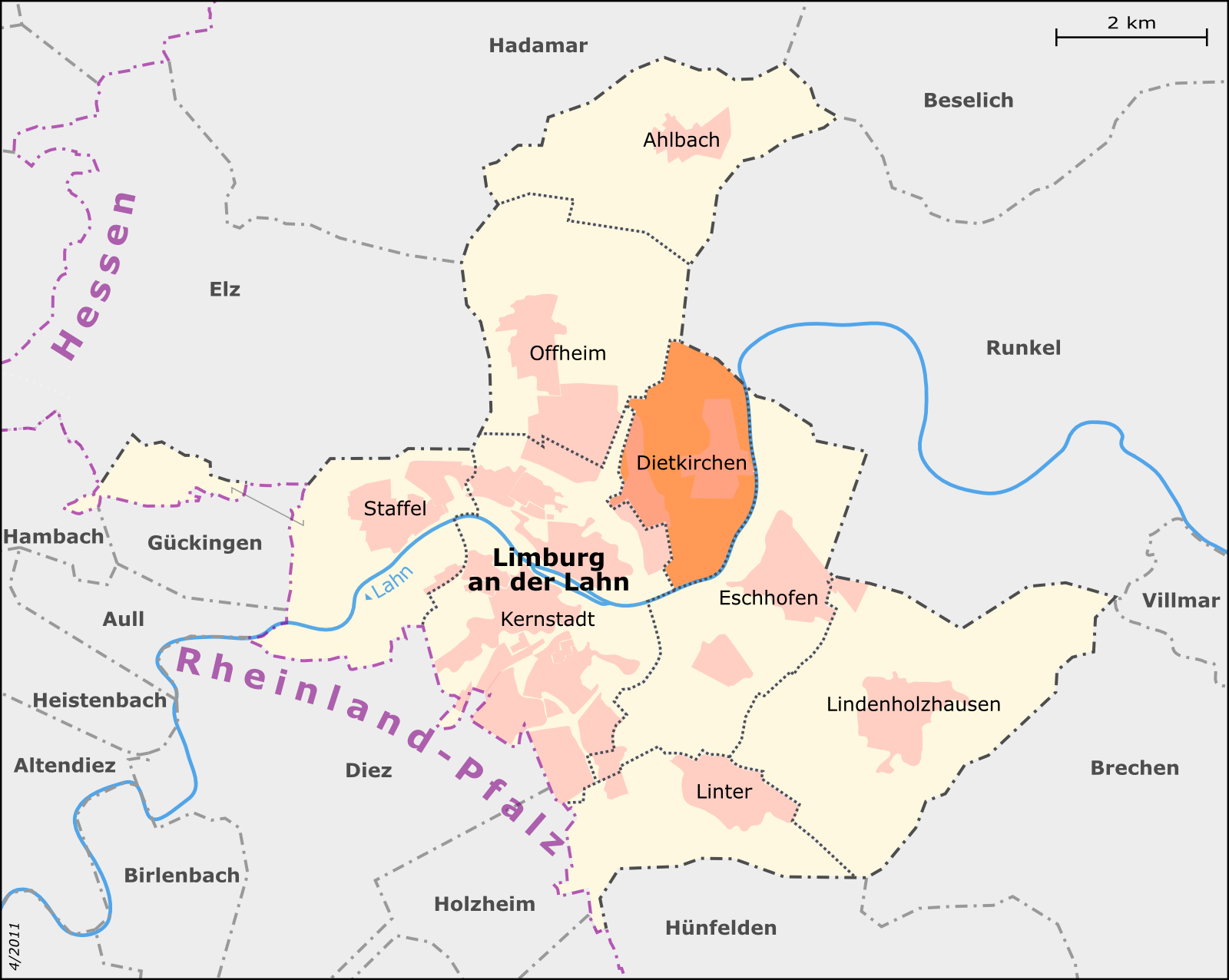
- Location of Dietkirchen in the town of Limburg
- Interactive map of Dietkirchen
- Location within Germany Location within Hesse
- Coordinates: 50°24′10″N 8°5′30″E
- Country: Germany
- State: Hesse
- District: Limburg-Weilburg
- Town: Limburg an der Lahn

Government
  - Mayor: Bernhard Eufinger

Area
  - Total: 3.096 km^{2} (1.195 sq mi)

Population (2020)
  - Total: 1,630
  - Density: 526/km^{2} (1,360/sq mi)
- Time zone: UTC+01:00 (CET)
  - Summer (DST): UTC+02:00 (CEST)
- Postal codes: 65553
- Dialling codes: 06431

Dietkirchen an der Lahn is a borough (Ortsbezirk) of Limburg an der Lahn, seat of the district of Limburg-Weilburg in the state of Hesse, Germany. The formerly independent village was incorporated into Limburg in 1971. The town is dominated by the basilica St. Lubentius, which was the most important early-medieval church building in the region.

== Geography ==
Dietkirchen is situated directly on the west (left) bank of the Lahn River. Its prominent feature is the towering limestone bluff on which St. Lubentius is built. The central town of Limburg is located in a widening of the Lahn valley. Dietkirchen is situated at the eastern end of this widening, with the valley becoming narrow again near Runkel.

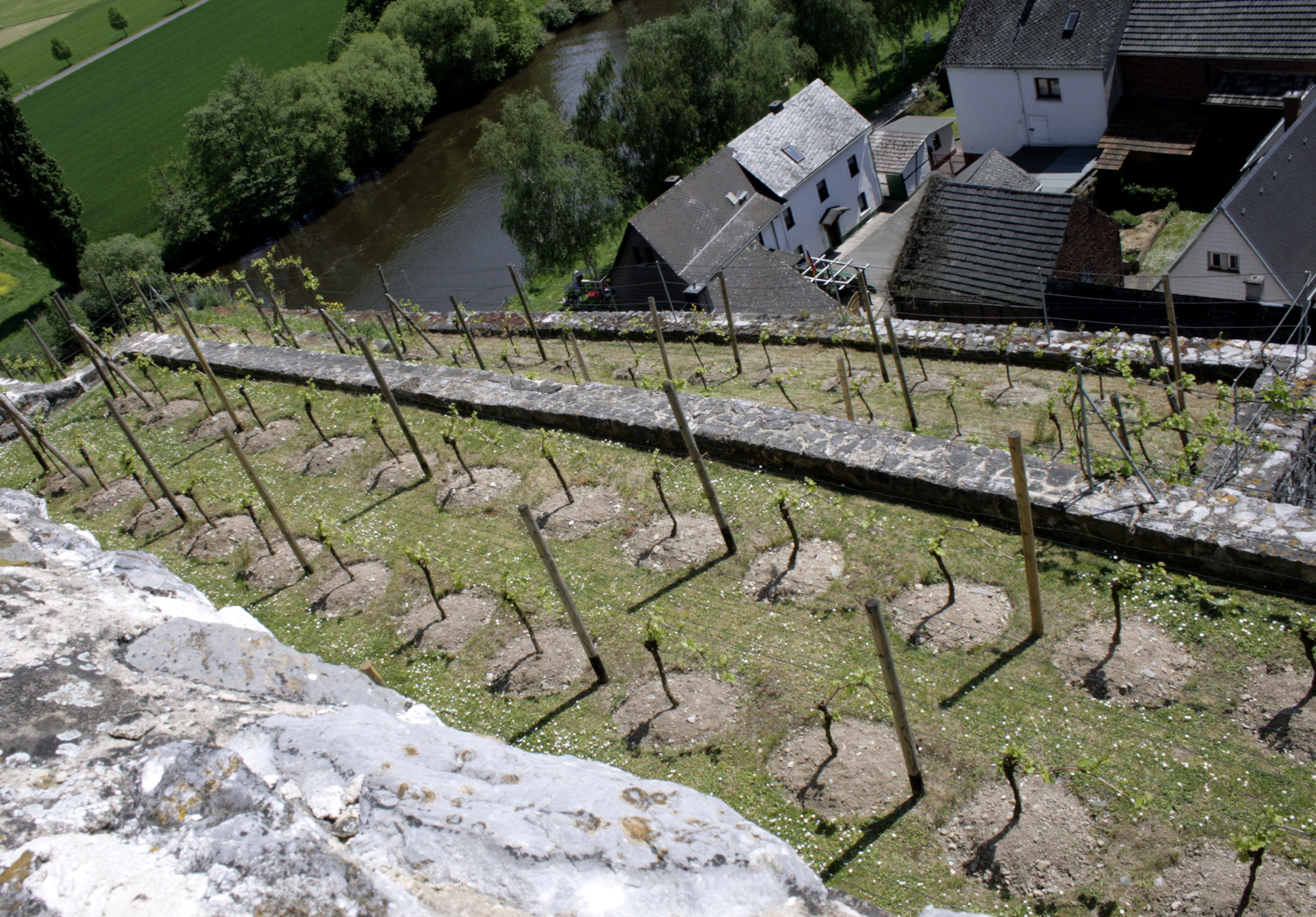
Vineyards above the village as viewed from St. Lubentius

The old village is characterized by a large height differential, with housing plots situated on terraces formed by numerous retaining walls. The village itself is situated at an elevation of 120 to 170 meters. In the northern part of the borough, the landscape rises up to 180 meters, while in the southern part, on the banks of the Lahn below the church's bluff, it drops to 115 meters.

With a surface area of 309.59 hectares (765.0 acres), Dietkirchen is the smallest borough of Limburg. Its surroundings consist almost exclusively of agricultural land, with the exception of the vegetation on the banks of the Lahn.

The borough is bordered to the north by the Runkel borough of Dehrn, in the east and south by Eschhofen, in the west by the central city of Limburg, and in the northwest by Offheim.

== History ==
=== Early history ===
In the area of the church St. Lubentius, archaeologists have discovered traces of a cult site from the Copper Age (2000 to 4000 BC), as well as the remains of a settlement assigned to the Urnfield culture (1300 to 800 BC). Excavations in the Basilica suggest that before the Church was constructed the site on the limestone bluff had been a pagan cult and gathering place.

The Reckenforst, a judicial meeting place which exercised high jurisdiction over the wider environs in at least in the Early Middle Ages, was nearby. It was mentioned as early as 1217.

Dietkirchen is first mentioned in documents in 841 as "in ecclesia dietkircha". The village, however, is older. A low noble family, "the Dietkirchener Lords," resided there.

The meaning of the toponym is unclear. The second part, "kirchen" (German for church), refers, according to the unanimous opinion, to the St. Lubentius church. The problem is in the interpretation of the syllable "diet." Some historians speculate that it comes from Old High German, and means "the people." The village's name then meant "people's church" and refers to the prominent position of the Archdeaconate as a central church. Others advocate a pre-Germanic meaning of "diet" referring to the important ford on the Lahn below the church.

In the history of the village, the Christianization of the Lahn region and the St. Lubentius basilica play a special role. The legend that Lubentius himself ministered there is demonstrably wrong. The beginnings of Christianity in the Lahn region date approximately to between the 6th and the end of the 7th centuries. In this period was probably also the founding of the village.

=== St. Lubentius ===
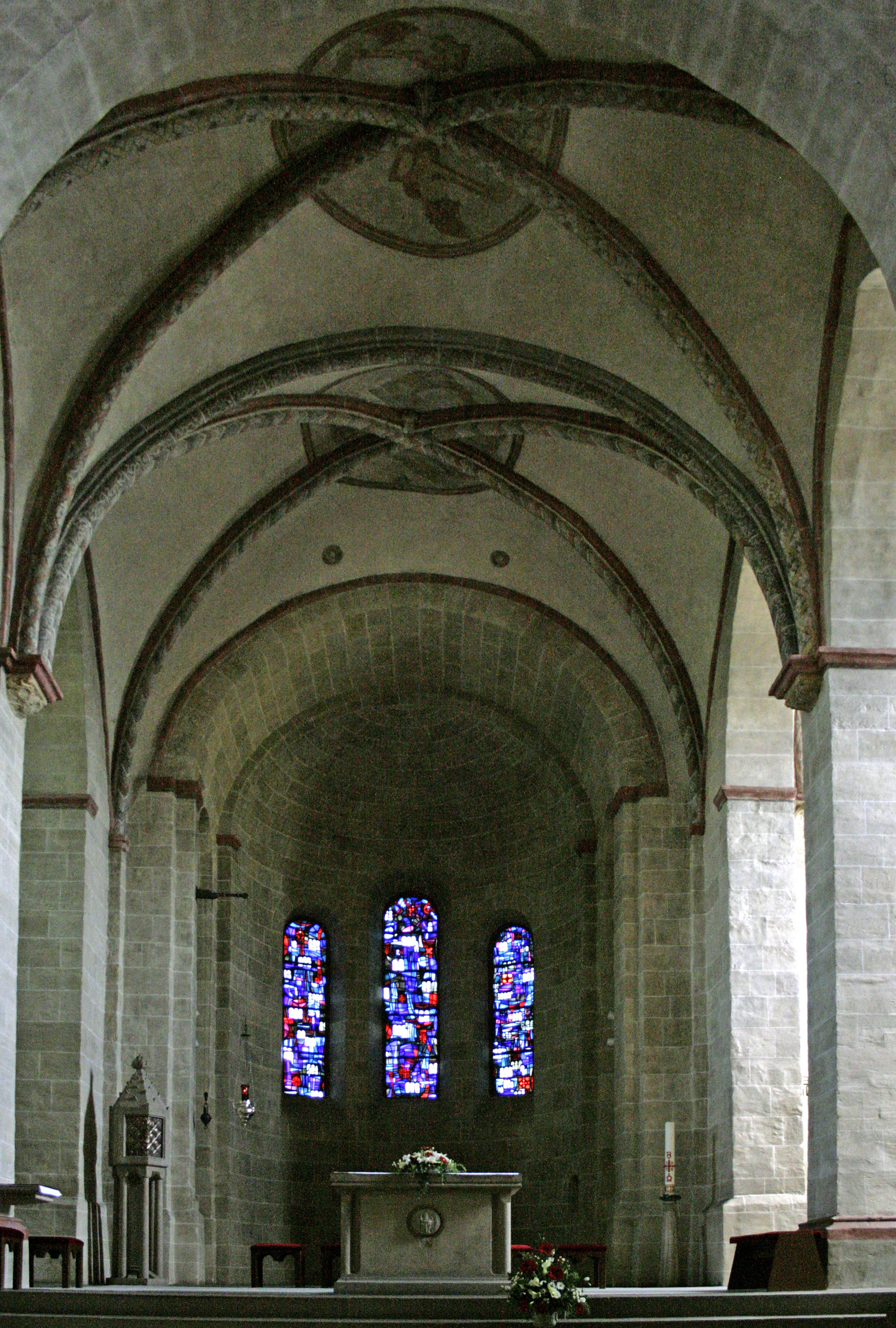
Chancel of St. Lubentius Basilica

The Romanesque basilica of St. Lubentius is situated in the midst of a park-like cemetery. Its architecture is typical of the time, characterized by heavy members and generally cubic bulkiness, from which only the interior manages in places to break away. The aspirations of the architecture and the quality of the interior decoration remind one today of the important role St. Lubentius played in church politics.

The first mention of the collegiate church of St. Lubentius dates to 841. It was built between 830 and 838. The parish counted around 425 souls at the time. According to archaeological finds, it replaced an earlier stone parish church built in about 720, which itself had replaced a wooden predecessor probably built as early as 580.

It became an archdeaconate of the Archdiocese of Trier, possibly as early as 900 and definitely by 1021. The entire part of the Diocese of Trier on right bank of the Rhine was managed from Dietkirchen. Six deaneries were subordinate to it.

Construction of the basilica may have already begun by 1021. The present structure was consecrated on August 5, 1225. Supposedly, the construction lasted only about ten years. In addition to St. Lubentius, St. Juliana was also selected as a patron of the church. In the Romanesque church lie the remains of St. Lubentius, around which many legends have formed. Probably his remains were transported from Kobern on the Mosel to Dietkirchen before 841.

By no later than 1326, the deanery of Dietkirchen also possessed a separate land chapter (German Landkapitel), a spiritual community analogous to a collegiate chapter. Its memorial book recorded its last entry in 1709, after the rest of the land chapters in the Archdeaconate had been dissolved in the Protestant Reformation.

Several members of the Frei family of Dehrn, a regionally important house of lower nobility, were buried at the church.

=== Lahn crossings ===
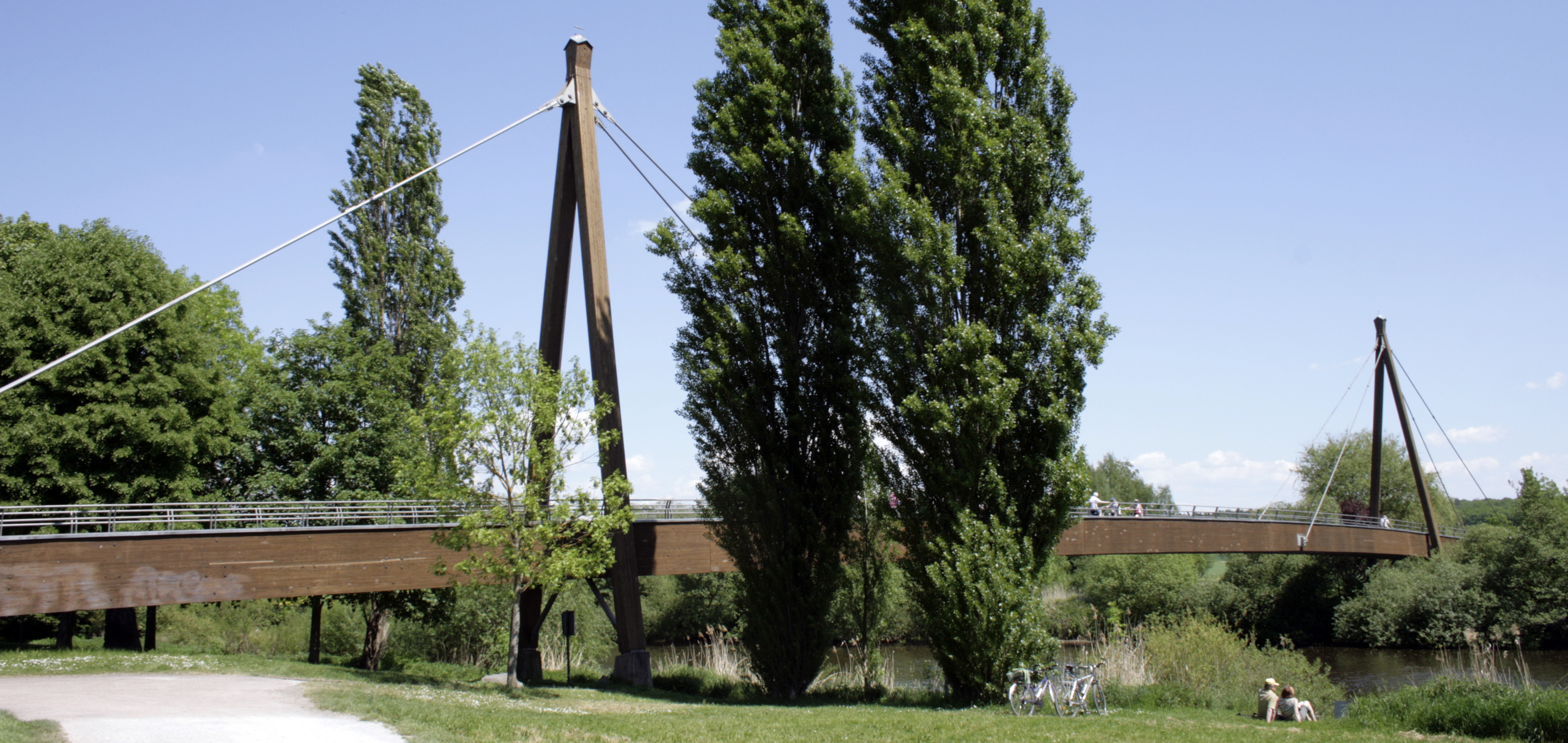
Pedestrian bridge over the Lahn at Dietkirchen

The Lahn Ferry at Dietkirchen was mentioned already between 1048 and 1098. The operation of this ferry was given as a feudal right. The ferry service ended in 1959. As a replacement, a 145 meter long and 3.30 meter wide wooden bicycle and pedestrian bridge was built beneath the rock in 1989. Regional bike paths R7 and R8 cross the Lahn via this bridge.

Near the mouth of the Emsbach, a small stream that enters the Lahn between Dietkirchen and Eschhofen, there is a ford across the Lahn that was used intensively in the late Frankish period. The imperial postal service later used this crossing on its Frankfurt-Cologne route. The area is still known as the Postmauer (post wall) today.

=== Dietkirchen Market ===
When the Dietkirchen Market began is not known, but it probably dates to the High Middle Ages. Evidence of a fair (German Jahrmarkt) on the Feast of St. Lubentius dates to the late 13th century, but it is clearly mentioned only in 1538. The market was an attraction for visitors from the surrounding area.

The historical market was renewed in 1991 at the initiative of then-mayor Kurt van der Burg and with the co-operation of all the clubs in the town. It now takes place every three years.

=== Prisoner of war camp and military cemetery ===
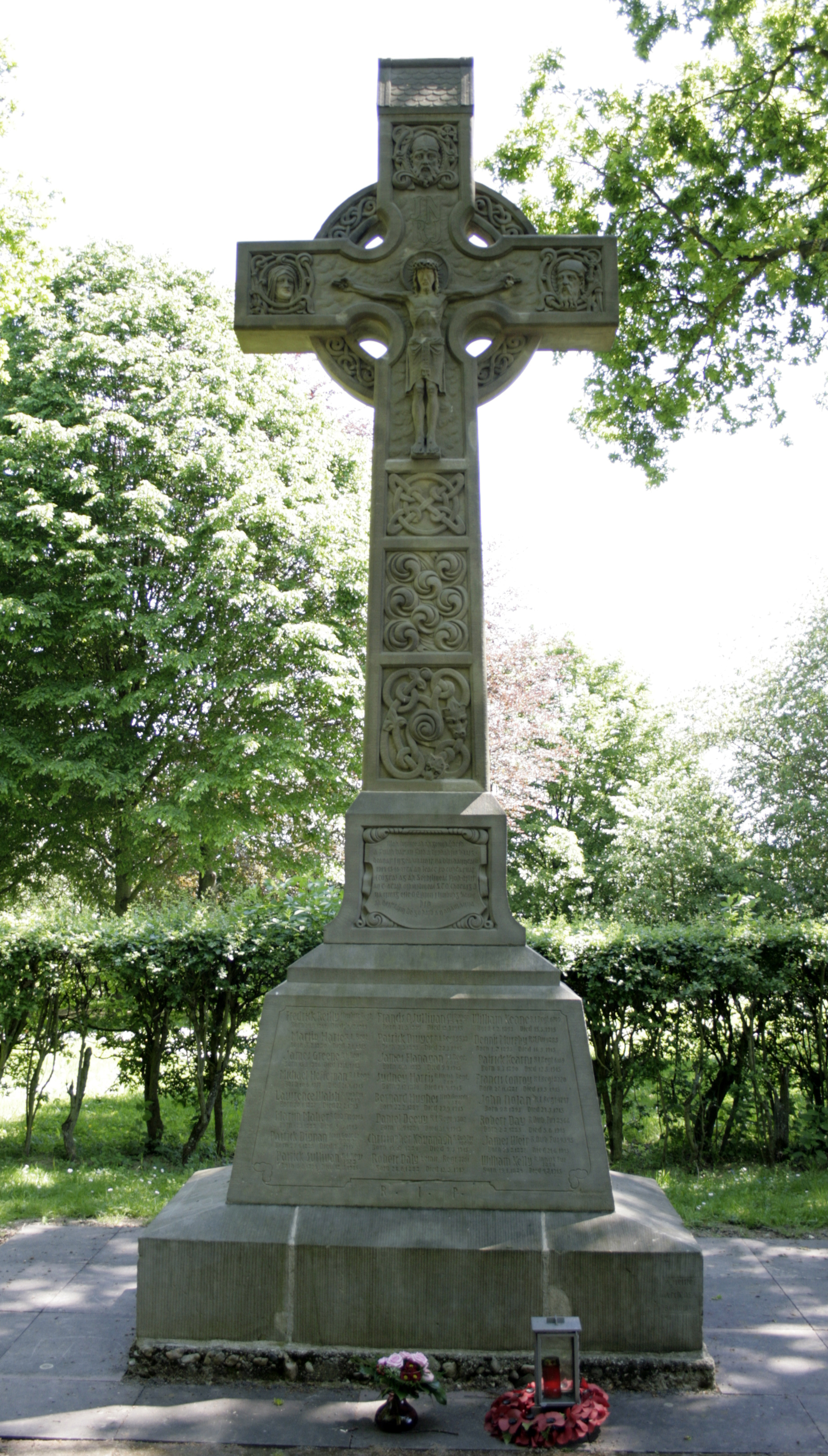
Memorial to Irish World War I dead buried at Dietkirchen military cemetery

At the end of 1914, during World War I, a prisoner of war camp was established on both sides of the road from Limburg to Dietkirchen. Barracks were built to hold up to 12,000 inmates. First, these were mainly English, Irish, and French soldiers, while toward the end of the war there were especially Russians and Poles. Italians were also imprisoned there. The camp reached its occupancy limit in May 1915. During the day, the prisoners worked in local businesses and surrounding farms.

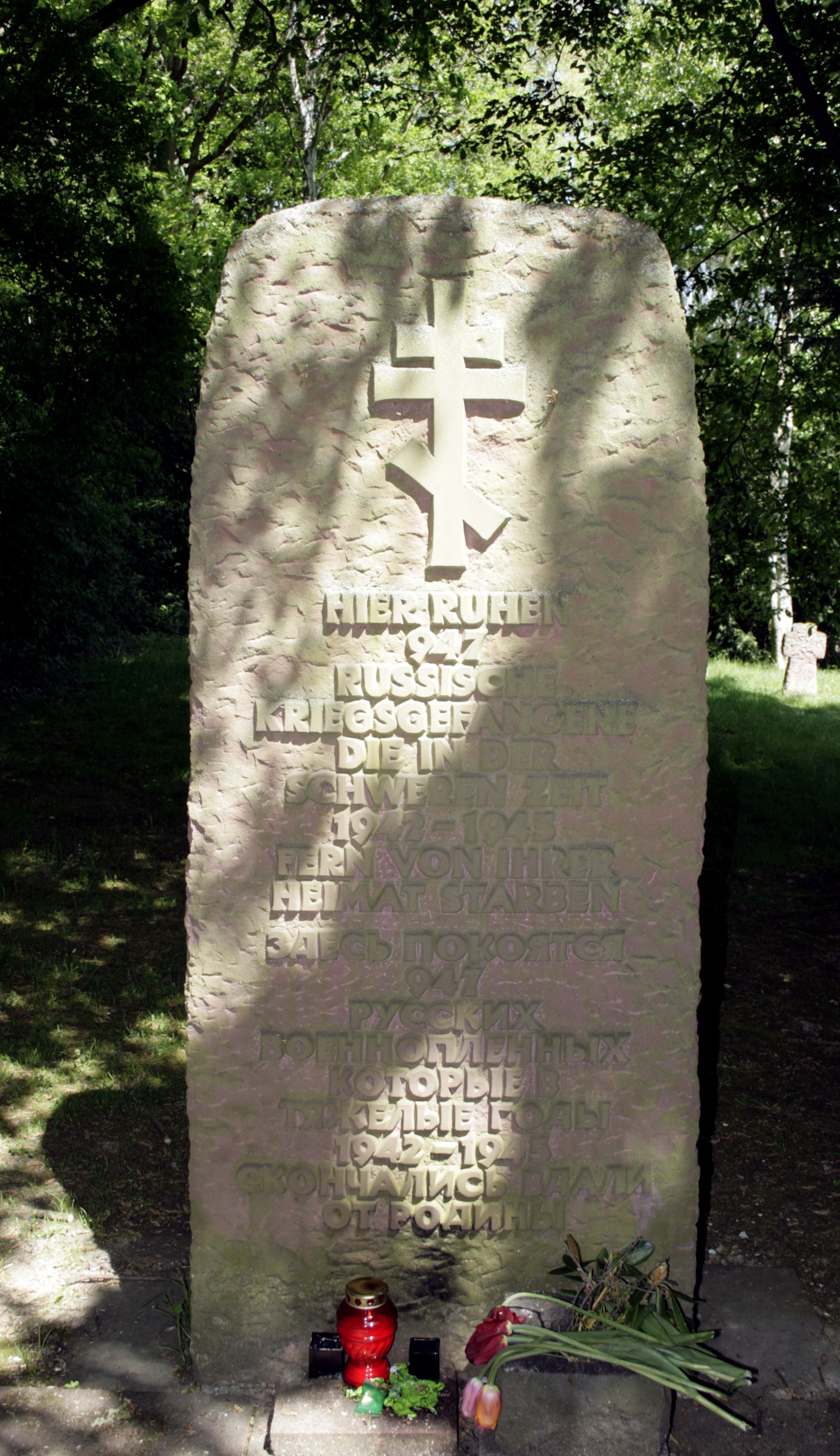
Memorial to Russian and Soviet soldiers of both world wars buried at Dietkirchen military cemetery

On December 23, 1914, the first prisoner to die in the camp, Irishman Frederick Reilly (born August 24, 1864, died December 20, 1914), was buried in the nearby graveyard with full military honors. In August 1916, the graveyard, which, together with the medical aid station, was located south of the road between Limburg and Dietkirchen, was expanded into a military cemetery. On the feast of Pentecost, May 25, 1917, a three-meter-high Celtic cross was erected to commemorate the Irish who had died in the camp. On August 3, a sculpture by French sculptor Eduard Colomo, himself a prisoner in Dietkirchen, was completed.

Until 1920, the camp served as a transit station for former German soldiers who had been released from Allied captivity. In 1923, all of the Russian dead and a Frenchman were exhumed and reinterred either in their homeland or at larger, central burial sites. From the First World War, a total of about 330 Russians, 130 French, 60 Italians, 47 British, 45 Irish, seven Serbs, two Belgians and a Romanian are still buried at the cemetery.

The camp cemetery was reused during World War II for Soviet prisoners of war who had died in the camp “Stammlager XII" in Diez. By the end of World War II, the number of Russian and Soviet soldiers buried there increased to an estimated 945. For that reason, the cemetery is locally known as the "Russian cemetery."

In 1954, the remains of three Russian prisoners of war, who were shot by men of the SS in the last days of the war in Oberweyer and had been buried there under the direction of the local mayor, were reburied in Dietkirchen. In 1959, at the site of the no-longer-maintained French monument, the city of Limburg erected a memorial stone for the Russian dead. Between 1998 and 2005, the entire cemetery was fundamentally renovated.

=== Incorporation into Limburg ===
In 1971, within the framework of territorial reform in Hesse, Dietkirchen lost its independence and became the first of the surrounding villages to be incorporated into the City of Limburg. Since 2001, Dietkirchen has been part of the Hessian village renewal program. Supported by funding from this program, several old agriculture buildings, particularly on Brunnenstraße and Limburgerstraße, were renovated and converted into homes.

== City partnership ==
The twinning of Limburg with Oudenburg, Belgium had its origin in an initiative of the municipality of Dietkirchen shortly before its incorporation into Limburg.

== Sources ==
- Wolf-Heino Struck : Das Stift St. Lubentius in Dietkirchen (The College of St. Lubentius in Dietkirchen), Walter de Gruyter, Berlin 1986 (Part of the series Germania Sacra).
- Marie-Luise Crone: Dietkirchen, Geschichte eines Dorfes im Schatten des St. Lubentiusstifts (Dietkirchen, History of a Village in the shadow of St. Lubentius Church), Magistrat der Kreisstadt Limburg an der Lahn, 1991, ISBN 3-9802789-0-5.
- Wilhelm Schäfer: Die Baugeschichte der Stiftskirche St. Lubentius zu Dietkirchen im Lahntal (The architectural history of the Collegiate Church of St. Lubentius of Dietkirchen in the Lahn Valley), self-published by the Historical Commission for Nassau, Wiesbaden 1966.
- Schulchronik Dietkirchen: 1825 - 1969 (School Chronicle of Dietkirchen: 1825 - 1969), Magistrat der Kreisstadt Limburg an der Lahn, 2002.
- Lorenz Müller: St. Lubentius und Dietkirchen an der Lahn, Eine Untersuchung (St. Lubentius and Dietkirchen an der Lahn, An investigation), self-published by the author, 1969.
- Wilhelm Schäfer: Die Stiftskirche St. Lubentius und Juliana zu Dietkirchen im Lahntal (The Collegiate Church of St. Lubentius and Juliana of Dietkirchen in the Lahn Valley), Darmstadt 1964.
- Wolf-Heino Struck: Das Nekrologium II des St. Lubentius-Stiftes zu Dietkirchen ad Lahn, Mainz, Ges. f. Mittelrhein. Kirchengeschichte, 1969.
