= Oranienstein =

- Schloss Oranienstein, one of the palaces of the house of Orange-Nassau, sited at Diez on the Lahn
- 58095 Oranienstein, a minor planet
