= Dierstein Abbey =

German Benedictine nunnery

Coordinates: 50.3839°N 8.0111°E

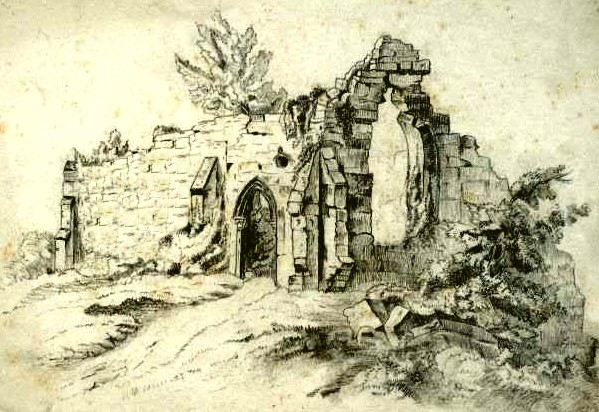
17th-century drawing showing the nunnery in ruins after the Thirty Years' War

Dierstein Abbey (German: Kloster Dierstein) was a Benedictine nunnery, on the site now occupied by Schloss Oranienstein near Diez an der Lahn, Rhineland Palatinate, Germany.

It is first recorded in 1153 and was probably founded by the counts of Diez. A second church is recorded in 1221, dedicated to John the Baptist. In 1466 Abbess Elisabeth Beyer von Boppard, who came from Marienberg Abbey (near Boppard), introduced the statutes of the Bursfelde Congregation. It had extensive endowments in its heyday, but in 1564 it was abolished. It was recorded in 1643 that it had fallen into ruin.

During the construction of the Schloss Oranienstein's main wing between 1672 and 1681, stones were re-used from the chapel and the nunnery ruins. During the 1704-09 rebuild of the Schloss, the last visible ruins of the monastic buildings disappeared.
