= Oranienstein Letters =

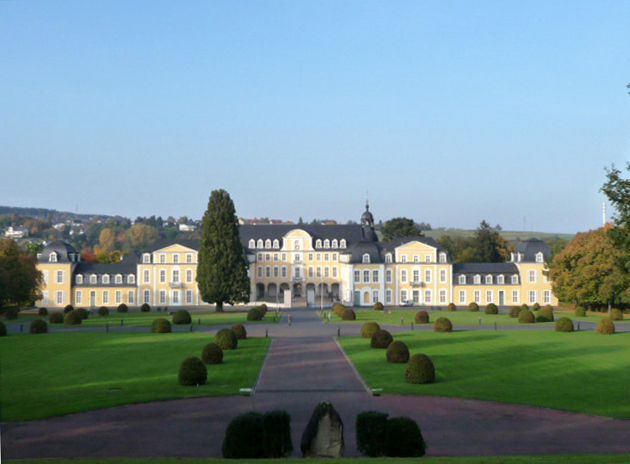
Schloss Oranienstein in 2008.

The Oranienstein Letters are a series of letters sent by William V, Prince of Orange in December 1801 from Schloss Oranienstein near Diez, Germany. William addressed them to 15 Orangist ex-regenten of the old Dutch Republic and advised them to end their staying out of government. That meant that some of his instructions given in the Kew Letters, which urged resistance against the French–Batavian invasion, were no longer in effect. He and his son, William Frederick, also recognised the Batavian Republic as legitimate and renounced their hereditary stadtholderate. Those were preconditions set by First Consul Napoleon Bonaparte of the French Republic for compensation for the loss of their possessions in the Netherlands, which had been confiscated by the Batavian Republic.

William V decreed those letters only after much hesitations, and he would later refuse to accept the mediatised Fulda monastery and the Imperial Abbey of Corvey as compensation, but he agreed that William Frederick had done so and thus became Prince of Nassau-Orange-Fulda.

== See also ==
- Reichsdeputationshauptschluss
- Treaty of Lunéville
