= Kew Letters =

Historic letters

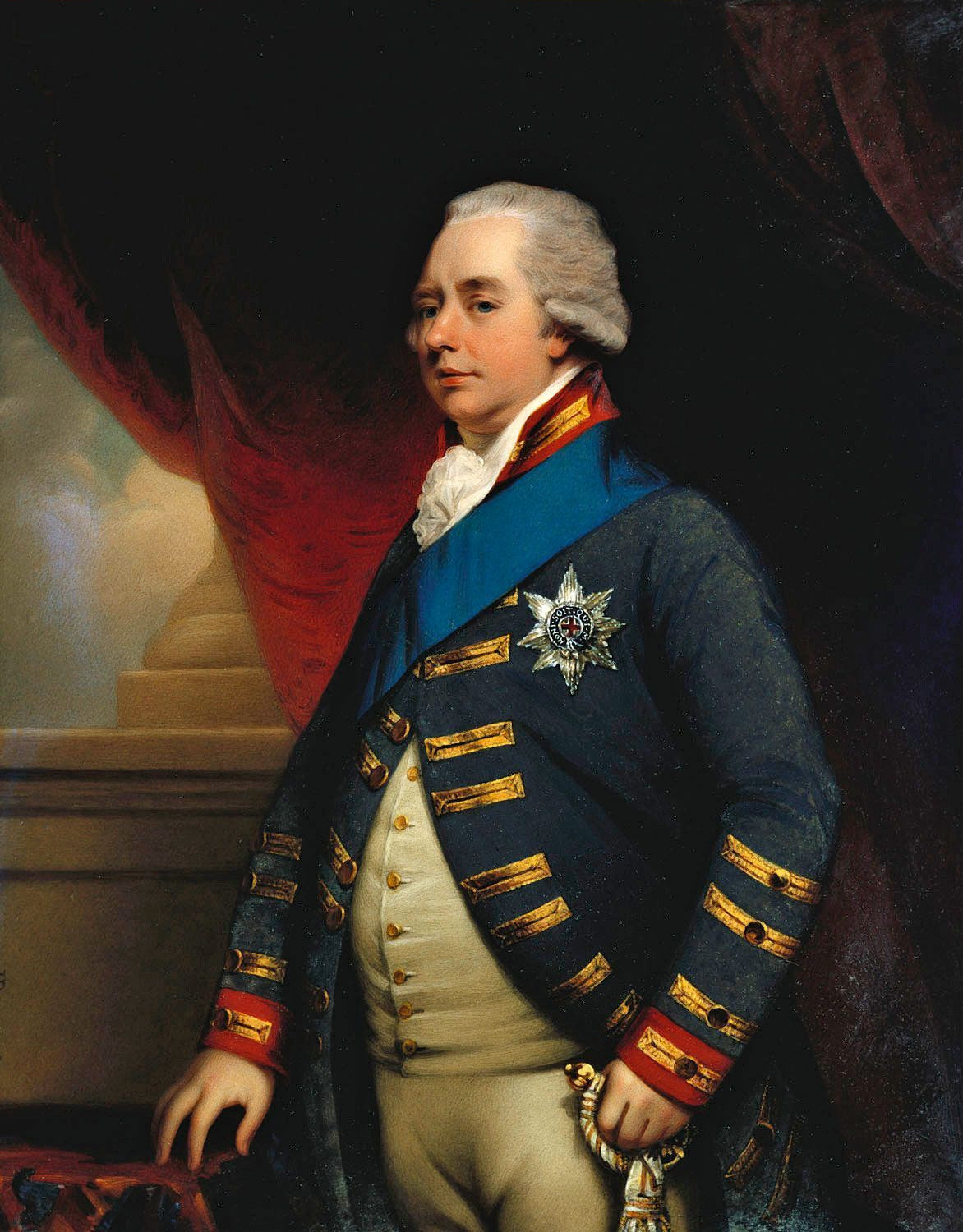
William V, Prince of Orange, who wrote the letters

The Kew Letters (also known as the Circular Note of Kew) were a number of letters, written by stadtholder William V, Prince of Orange between 30 January and 8 February 1795 from the "Dutch House" at Kew Palace, where he temporarily stayed after his trip to England on 18 January 1795. The letters were written in his capacity of Captain-general of the Dutch Republic to the civil and military authorities in the provinces of Zeeland and Friesland (that had not yet capitulated at the time), to the officers commanding Dutch naval vessels in British harbours and to Dutch colonial governors. It urged them to continue resistance in cooperation with Great Britain against the armed forces of the French Republic that had invaded the Dutch Republic and forced him to flee to England. In particular the letters to the colonial governors played an important role, because they ordered them to surrender those colonies to the British.

The governors of Malacca, Amboina, and West Sumatra complied without a fight. Cochin surrendered after a brief bombardment. The rest of the Dutch enclaves in southern India and seaside Sri Lanka were quickly taken as well. Elsewhere, though the governors did not comply with the order to put their military installations at British disposal, many were confused and demoralised by the letters.

In the 1801 Oranienstein Letters, William V and his son did recognise the Batavian Republic, and renounced their hereditary stadtholderate.
