= St. Lubentius, Dietkirchen =

St. Lubentius
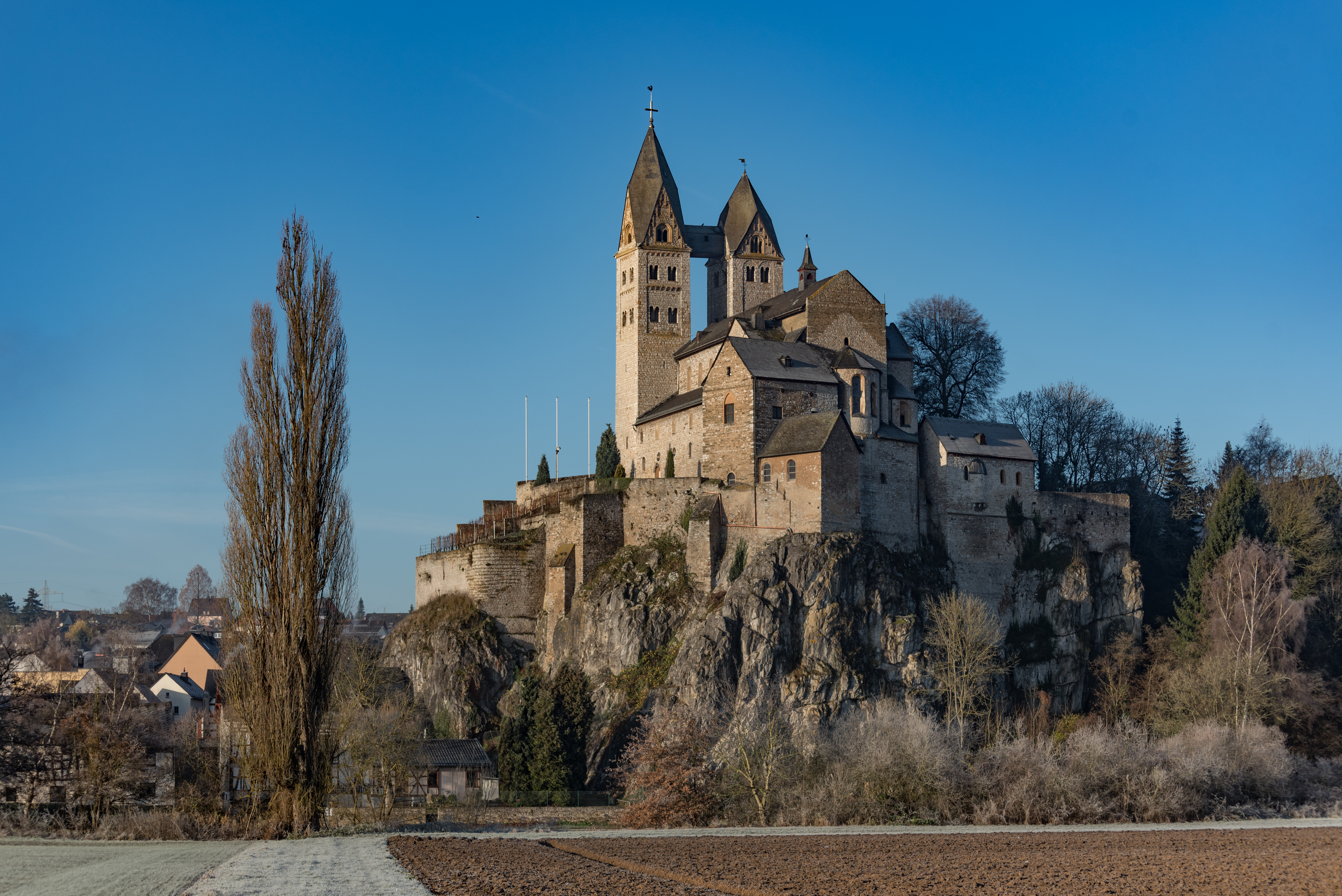
- The church on a rock outcrop above the river Lahn, from the south-east

- Location within Hesse Location within Germany
- 50.402962°N 8.096382°E
- Location: Dietkirchen, Hesse
- Country: Germany
- Denomination: Catholic

History
- Status: church
- Dedication: St Lubentius

Architecture
- Functional status: active, formerly collegiate church
- Heritage designation: listed monument
- Architectural type: basilica
- Style: Romanesque
- Years built: from c. 700
- Completed: 12th century

The church of St Lubentius in Dietkirchen, now part of Limburg an der Lahn, Hesse, Germany, was the most important church of the region until the 13th century. Located on top of a rock outcrop on the west bank of the river Lahn, it holds relics of St Lubentius, who according to the Gesta Treverorum worked in the area as a missionary in the fourth century. Today, the former collegiate church serves as the Catholic parish church of Dietkirchen, while its former chapel Dreifaltigkeitskapelle is the Protestant parish church. The church is a Romanesque basilica, mostly built in the 11th and 12th centuries, with a double tower at the west end.

== History ==
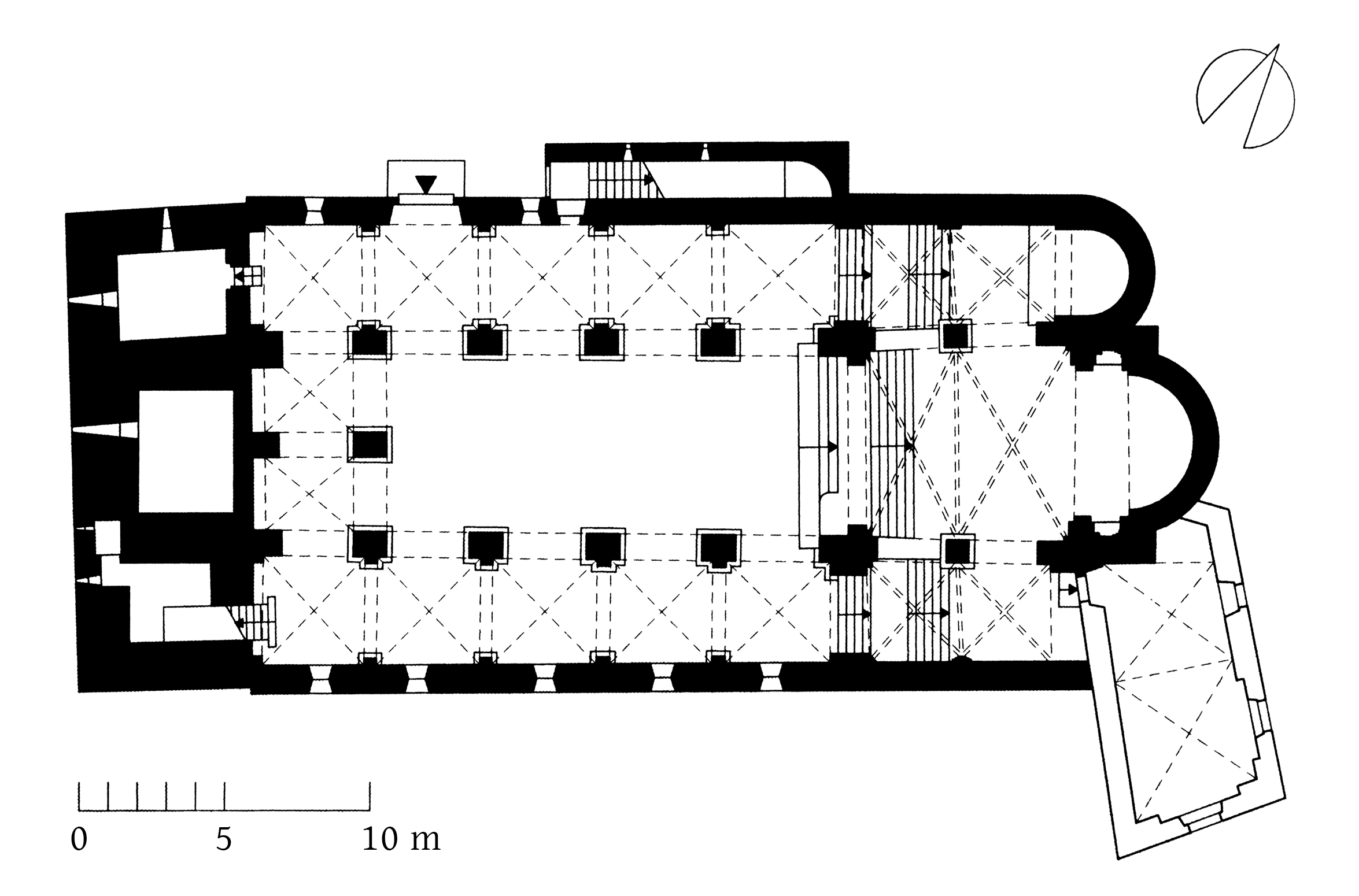
Floorplan

According to the Gesta Treverorum, the priest Lubentius founded the first church on the site during a missionary tour from Trier in the fourth century. Excavations show that a stone church was present on the site around 700. A collegiate church dedicated to St Lubentius is documented in 841. Carolingian and Ottonian structures are no longer visible. The remains of the saint were probably moved from Kobern, where he had died, to Dietkirchen.

The nave of the present church was built as a Romanesque basilica in the second half of the 11th century. The northern apse dates from around 1100. The two western steeples were later added. The church was changed to a basilica with balconies during the second half of the 12th century. It was completed between 1225 and 1250, and is the mother church (Mutterkirche) of all churches in the middle of the Lahn valley. The church is approximately 39 metres (128 ft) long and 16.5 metres (54 ft) wide.

The monastery was dissolved in 1801. The church was restored in 1855–56, and again in 1955. In the 1970s, the interior was adjusted to the concepts of the Second Vatican Council including redesign of the altar.

Among the other buildings clustered in the plateau atop the rock outcrop is the free standing while Dreifaltigkeitskapelle (Trinity chapel) which is used for monthly services of the local Protestant parish.

== Bells and organ ==
The church has five bells, the oldest from 1753 and the newest consecrated by Pope John Paul II in 1980.

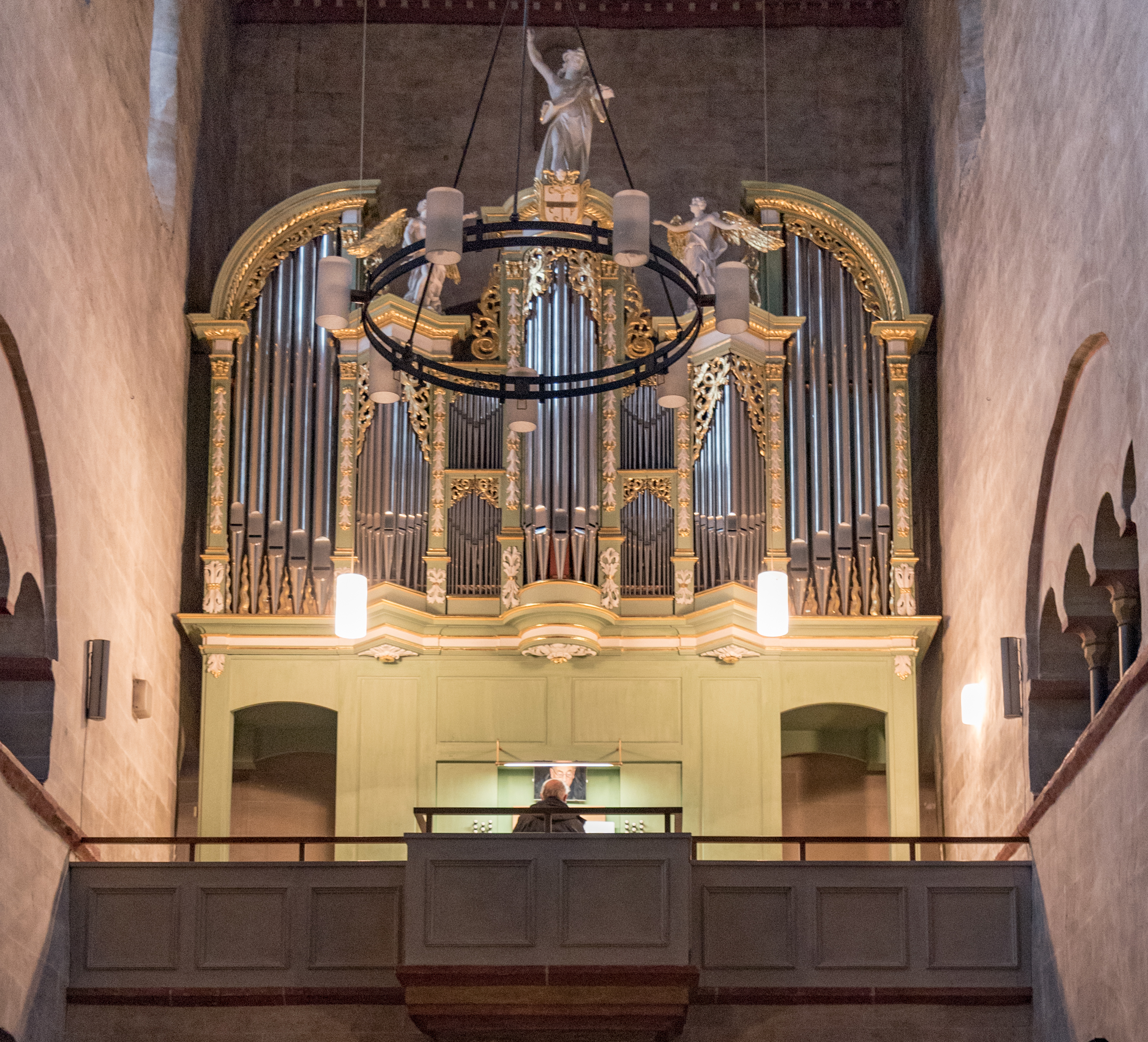
Organ

An organ is documented in 1294. The present organ was built in 1712 by Johann Jakob Dahm, who created an instrument with 13 stops on one manual. It was expanded in 1893 by Michael Keller from Limburg, and again in 1959 by Eduard Wagenbach. The original case was retained. The organ now has 29 stops on two manuals. In 2002, the organ was restored by the Marburg firm Gerald Woehl.

== Literature ==
- Folkhard Cremer (ed.): Handbuch der deutschen Kunstdenkmäler. Hessen I. Regierungsbezirke Gießen und Kassel. Deutscher Kunstverlag, München 2008, ISBN 978-3-422-03092-3, S. 165–170.
- Marie-Luise Crone: Dietkirchen. Geschichte eines Dorfes im Schatten des St. Lubentiusstifts. Magistrat der Kreisstadt Limburg an der Lahn, Limburg an der Lahn 1991, ISBN 3-9802789-0-5.
- Verena Fuchß, Landesamt für Denkmalpflege Hessen (ed.): Kulturdenkmäler in Hessen. Stadt Limburg. Konrad Theiss Verlag, Stuttgart 2007, ISBN 978-3-8062-2096-4, S. 455–459.
- Gabriel Hefele: Dietkirchen a. d. Lahn. Kath. Pfarrkirche St. Lubentius. 3. Auflage. Schnell & Steiner, Regensburg 2006, ISBN 978-3-7954-5802-7.
- Wilhelm Schäfer: Die Baugeschichte der Stiftskirche St. Lubentius zu Dietkirchen im Lahntal. Verlag der Historischen Kommission für Nassau, Wiesbaden 1966 (Veröffentlichungen der Historischen Kommission für Nassau XIX).
