= Schloss Oranienstein =

Coordinates: 50.3839°N 8.0111°E

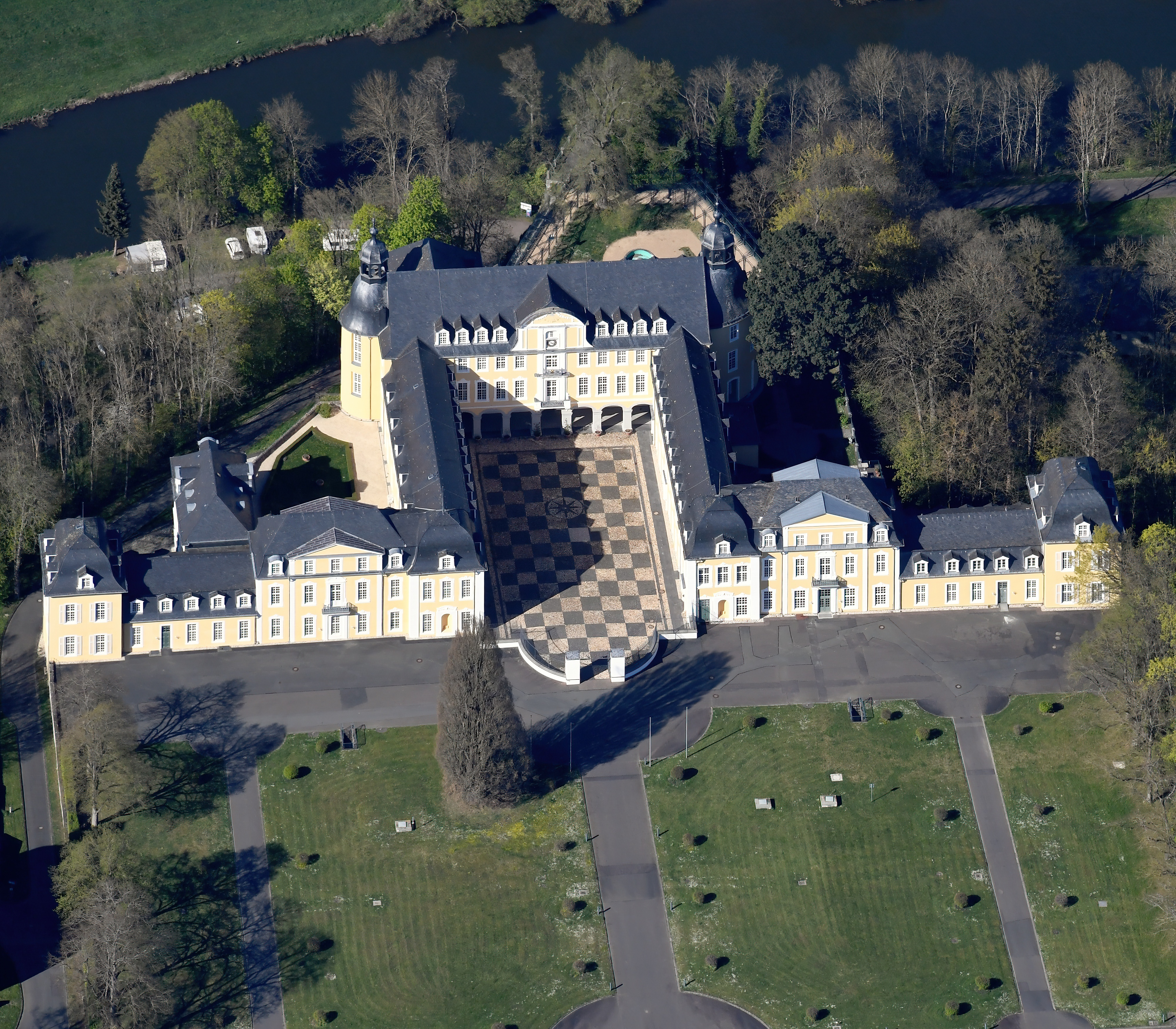
Schloss Oranienstein

Schloss Oranienstein is one of the palaces of the House of Orange-Nassau, sited at Diez on the Lahn. It was built on the ruins of Dierstein Abbey between 1672 and 1681 for Countess Albertine Agnes of Nassau after she was widowed. She also owned a palace in Frisia, the Palace of Oranjewoud.

After the French Republican invasion destroyed the Dutch Republic in 1795, stadtholder William V, Prince of Orange and his family first fled to England, before settling in Oranienstein for several years. Here, William and his son William Frederick issued the Oranienstein Letters, recognising the Batavian Republic and renouncing their stadtholderate and territorial claims in the Netherlands in return for financial and territorial compensation elsewhere, granted by First Consul Napoleon Bonaparte. In 1806, the castle fell to the newly formed Grand Duchy of Berg. Napoleon auctioned off the castle's entire contents in 1811. After Napoleon's defeat, the Congress of Vienna assigned Oranienstein to the Duchy of Nassau.

Following Nassau's defeat in the Austro-Prussian War, the Duchy was annexed by Prussia in 1866. One year later, the palace was turned over to the Royal Prussian Army, which established a cadet school in Oranienstein. After the First World War, the cadet school was dissolved. On the occasion of the 600th anniversary of the town of Diez in 1929, the castle was renovated and opened to the public. Under Nazi Germany, the castle was used as a boarding school of the National Political Education Institute from 1934 to 1945. After the end of the Second World War, the castle was turned over to the German Bundeswehr in 1957 and they still occupy it today, together with adjacent barracks. It also houses a museum.

== The palaces of the princesses of Orange ==
Albertine Agnes and her sisters each built a palace elsewhere in the Netherlands and Germany, every one of them named after the House of Orange:

- Oranienbaum Palace for Henriëtte Catharina
- Oranienburg Palace for Louise Henriëtte
- Oranienhof in Bad Kreuznach for Maria of Orange-Nassau
- Palace of Oranjewoud for Albertine Agnes
