= Lubentius =

Catholic Patron Saint of Boatmen (River Lahn)

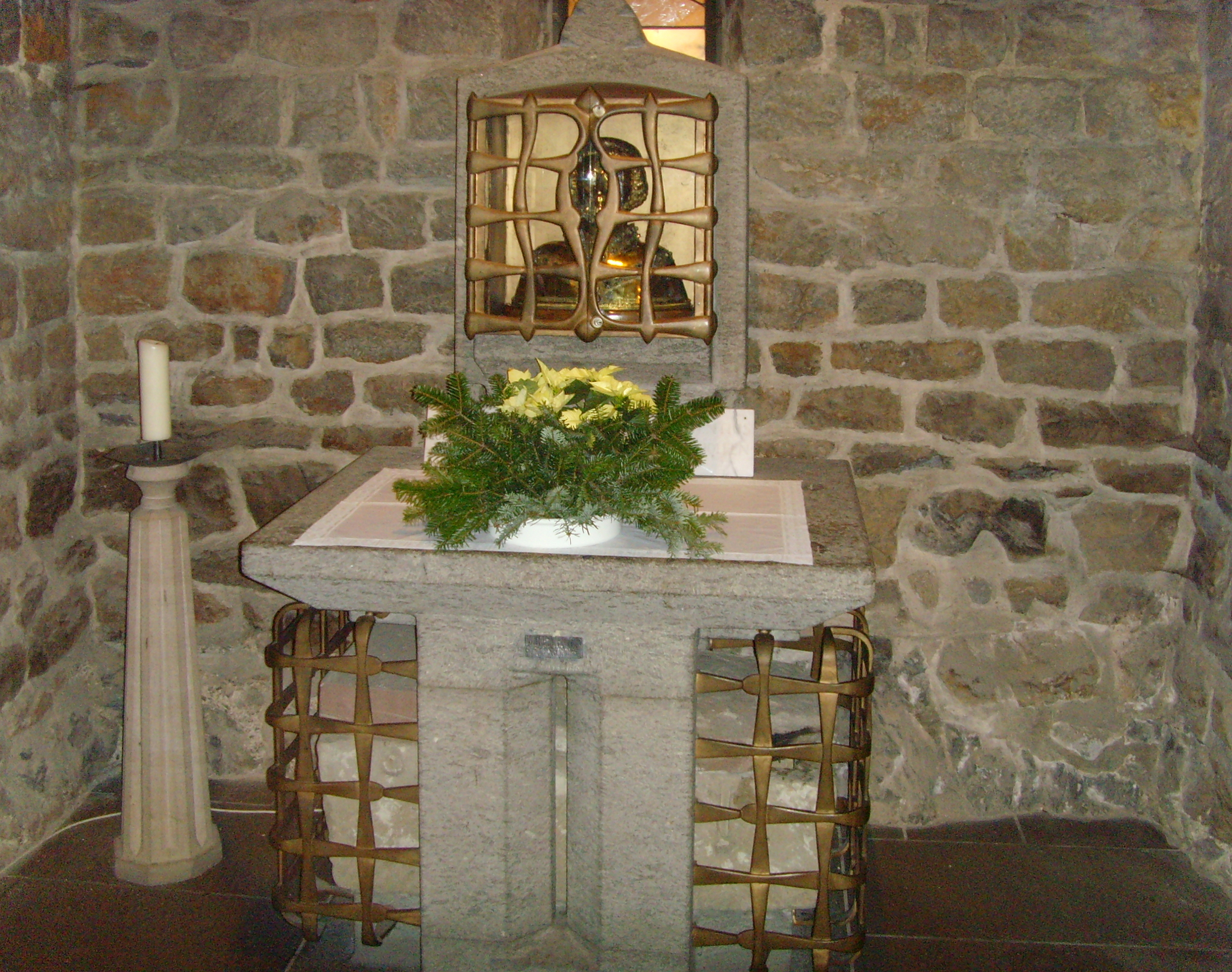
Relic of the saint's bust at St. Lubentius, Dietkirchen

Lubentius (c. 300 – c. 370) is a Christian saint, venerated by the Catholic Church. A patron saint of the boatmen on the River Lahn, his feast day is 13 October.

== Life ==
Lubentius was given by his parents when a small child, to Martin of Tours, who baptized him and treated him as a son. Martin later sent him to Bishop Maximin of Trier to be educated for the priesthood. When Lubentius came of canonical age, Maximin ordained him priest.

He worked as a parish priest in Kobern. In 349, Maximin died while visiting relatives in Acquitaine. His successor, Paulinus of Trier, sent Lubentius to retrieve the body. Lubentius traveled to Acquitaine, and after diligent search, discovered the church where Maximin's body lay. One night, he and his companions, stole the keys to the church from the sleeping custodian, and made off with the body, bringing it back to Trier.

According to the Gesta Treverorum from the 12th century, he worked as a missionary along the Lahn river and founded a church at Dietkirchen. He died in Kobern.

== Veneration ==
After he died, the people would have place his body in the local church but found that, try as they might, the body could not be moved. A reverend individual suggested placing the corpse in a boat and letting it float up or down the Moselle and choose its own burial site. When the boat reached the Rhine, instead of continuing downstream, if floated up the Lahn all the way to Dietkirchen. (A somewhat similar tale is told of Emmeram of Regensburg.) Baring-Gould describes this as a romantic legend that took the place of a probably very prosaic translation of relics. The remains of the saint were likely moved from Kobern, where he had died, to Dietkirchen some time before 841. His relics are at St. Lubentius, Dietkirchen, now part of Limburg an der Lahn. More relics are venerated in Kell, at St. Lubentius, Kobern, Lahnstein, Limburg and Trier.

=== Patronage ===
Saint Lubentius is a patron saint of the boatmen on the Lahn. His feast day is 13 October.

== Literature ==
- Lorenz Müller: St. Lubentius und Dietkirchen an der Lahn. Eine Untersuchung. 1969
- Martin Persch (1993). "Lubentius". In Bautz, Traugott (ed.). Biographisch-Bibliographisches Kirchenlexikon (BBKL) (in German). Vol. 5. Herzberg: Bautz. cols. 290–292. ISBN 3-88309-043-3. (including bibliography)
