= Hof te Dieren =

Former hunting lodge in Dieren, the Netherlands

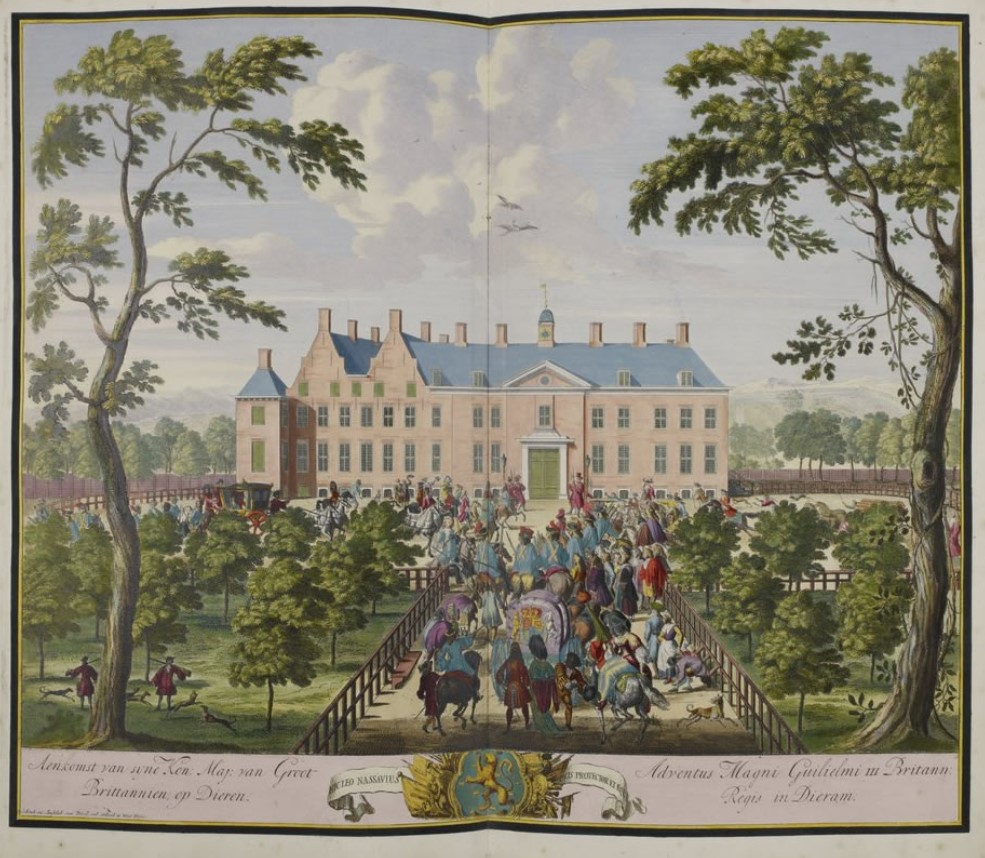
The British Library has a beautiful coloured engraving by Peter Schenk the Elder showing the arrival of King William III at the Hof te Dieren

Hof te Dieren (English: the Court at Dieren) is a former hunting lodge in Dieren, the Netherlands. It was a favourite retreat of the princes of Orange and king-stadtholder William III at the south-eastern border of the Veluwe. Nothing remains of the lodge nor from the 19th century manor house which was built as replacement. The estate is open for visit.

== History ==
=== Teutonic Order ===
In 1218, Adolf VI, count of Berg (1176-1218), donated his house and surrounding estate in Dieren to the Teutonic Order. They turned the house into a commandery of their order.

=== William II of Orange ===
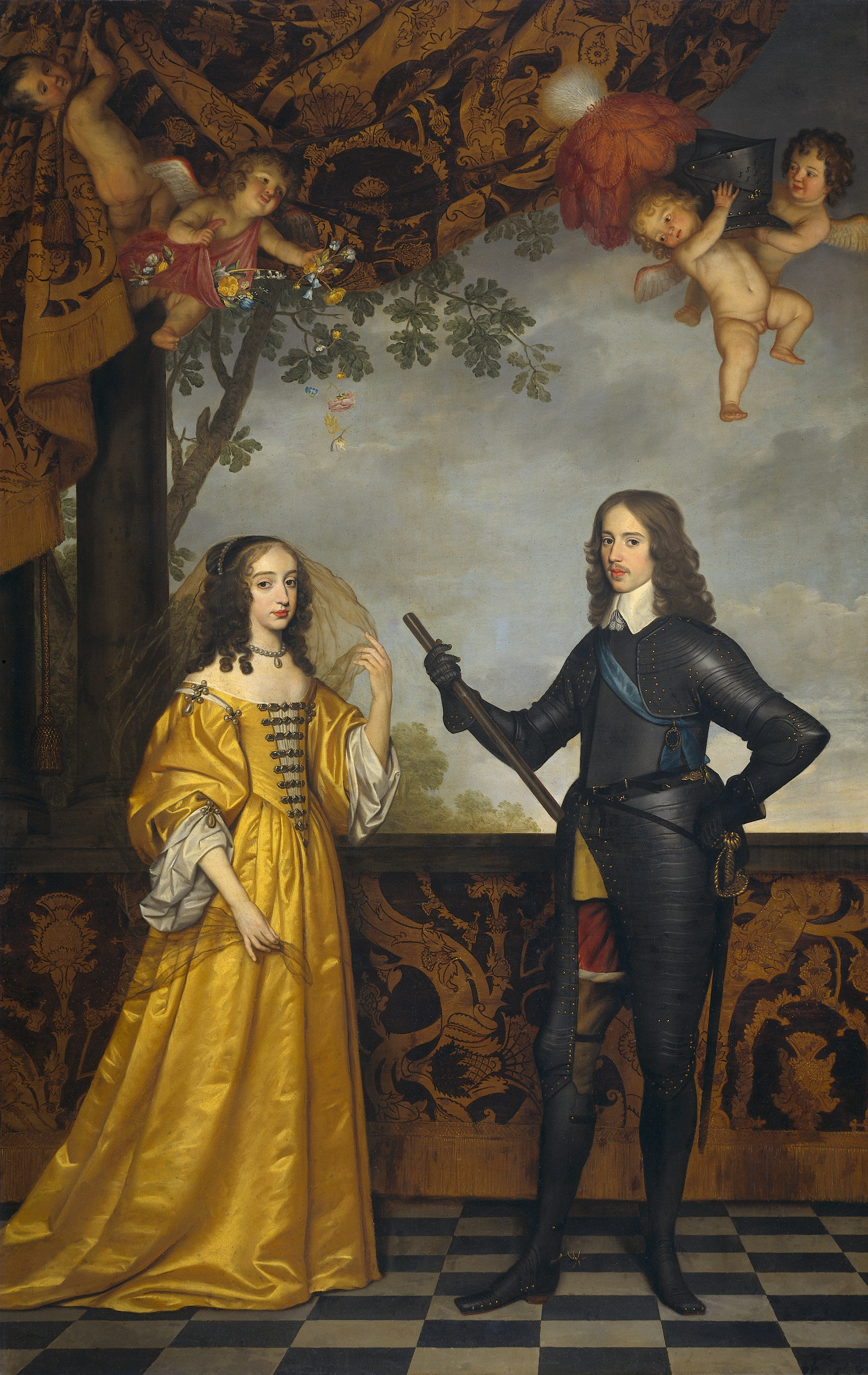
William II and Mary Stuart by Gerard van Honthorst

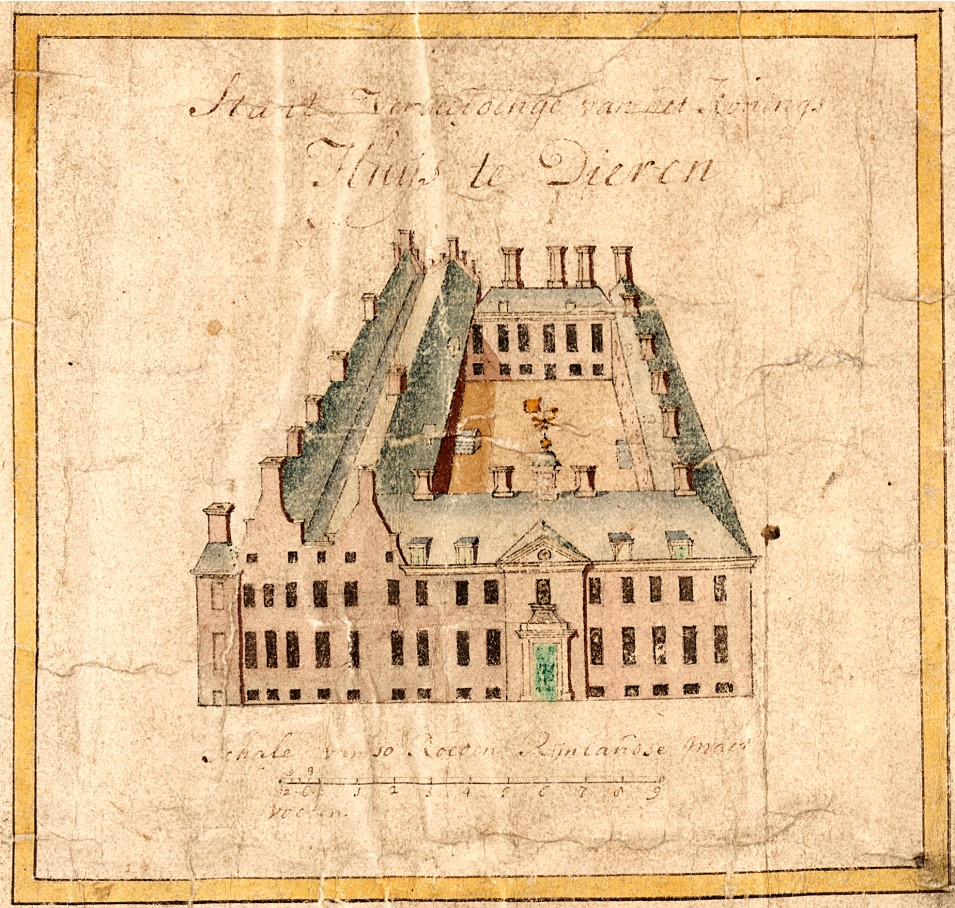
The double-roofed wing on the left is the original commandery of the Teutonic Order. The wings on the right were constructed under King William III. Extract from a 1724 map of Dieren by Bernt Elshof

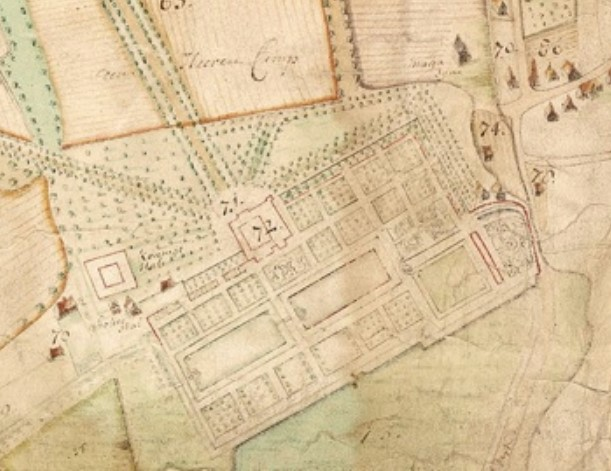
A map showing the Hof te Dieren and its surrounding gardens. Extract from a 1724 map of Dieren by Bernt Elshof

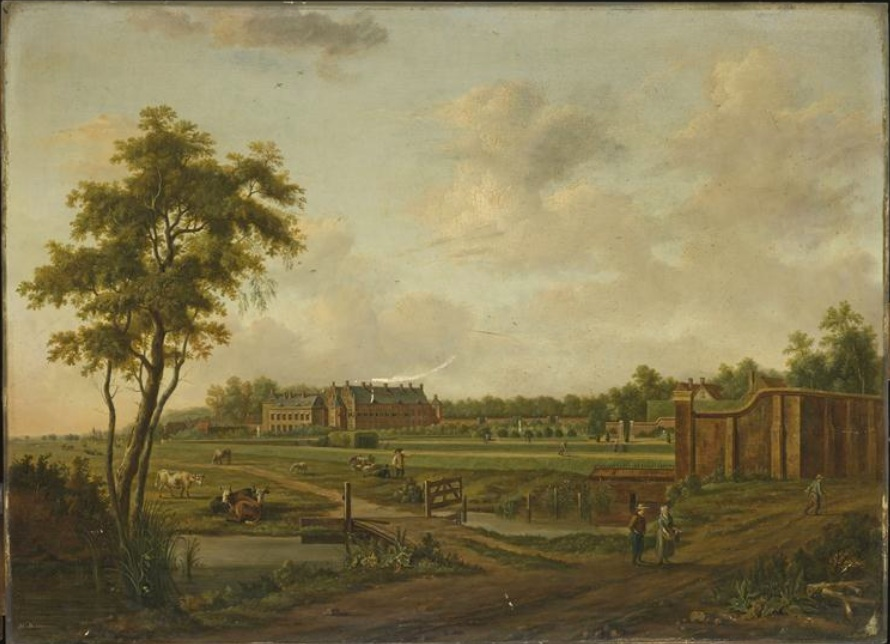
The painting by Hendrik Frans de Cort shows the Hof te Dieren overlooking the gardens

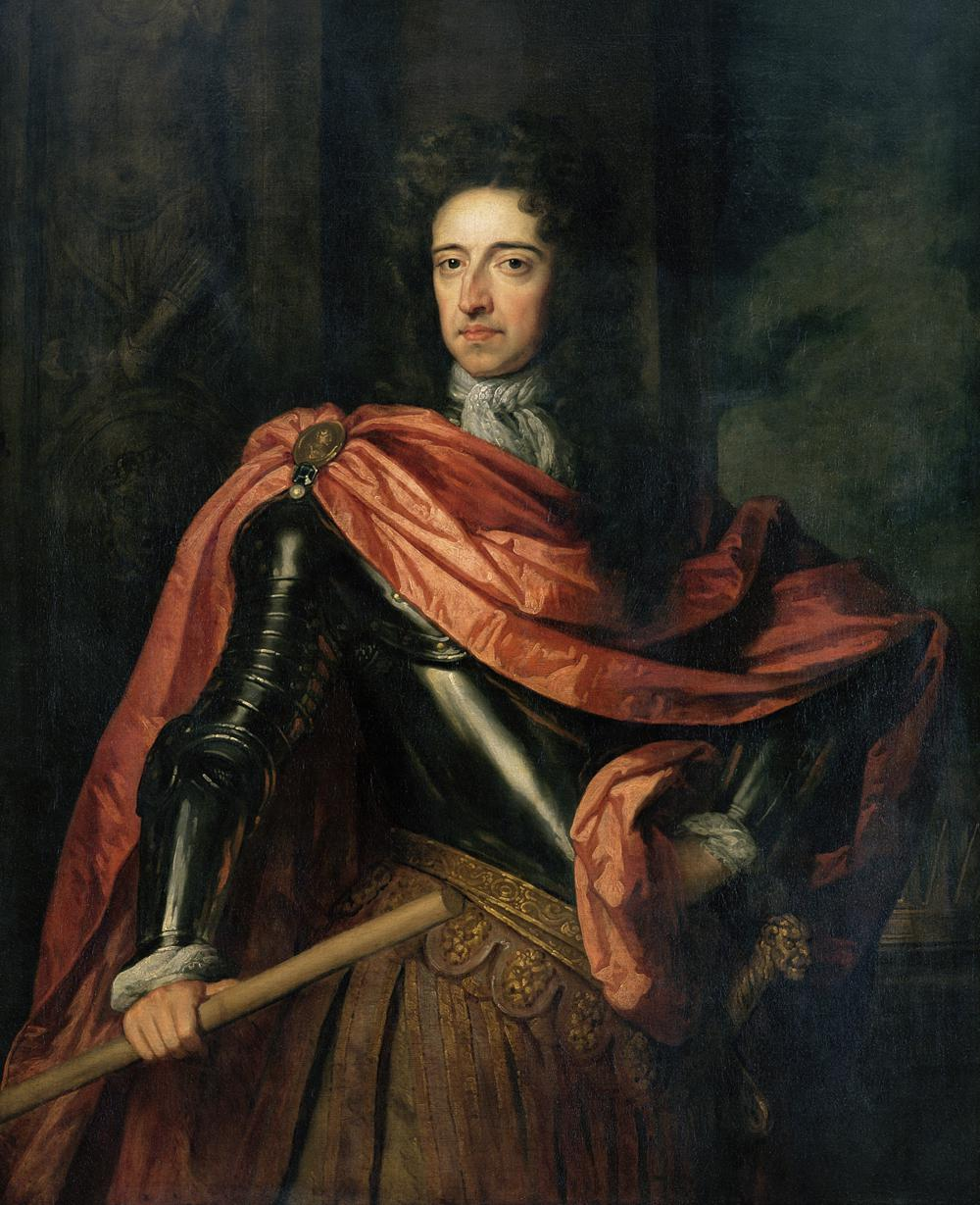
William III

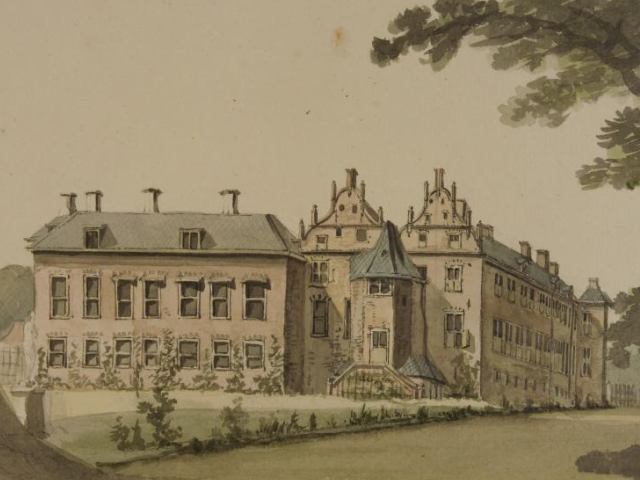
Hof te Dieren before 1795

The Veluwe were excellent hunting grounds, where William II, Prince of Orange (1626-1650) loved to hunt. In 1647, for a consideration of 147,000 florins, he acquired the commandery of the Teutonic order in Dieren. He repurposed the house as a hunting lodge. A playhouse was constructed on the Rouwenberg hill. Also, a deer park was established, containing deer, foxes, hares and rabbits. It was approximately 1,200 hectares in size, and enclosed by a wall of 20 kilometres. To have sufficient animals to hunt for, the Prince transferred around 300 deer from its estate of Huis Honselaarsdijk to Dieren. When Prince William II died and his son and successor, Prince William III was just born, the deer park was rented out for a period of ten years due to its high maintenance costs.

=== William III and Mary ===
Like his father, William III (1650-1702) was fond of hunting. In the first part of his reign as stadtholder, he spent as much as ten weeks a year hunting in the Veluwe. The Hof te Dieren was one of his favourite lodges.

When William married Mary Stuart (1662-1694) in 1677, the modest-sized house in Dieren with a number of outbuildings was no longer deemed suitable for the newly-weds. Therefore, William III decided to extend the house between 1679 and 1684. New wings around a court yard were constructed and apartments were added suitable for his retinue. The architect was Jacob Roman. While William was hunting, Mary enjoyed horticulture to pass the time. Therefore, a beautiful garden was laid out containing ponds, fountains, grottoes, arbours, and labyrinths. William's close friend, William Bentinck, 1st Earl of Portland, was closely involved in supervising the laying out and maintenance. Peter Schenk the Elder depicted these gardens in a series of engravings. The palace and the gardens were much admired by visitors as shown in diaries, letters and travel reports.

The Hof te Dieren was not the only palace William and Mary had in the Veluwe. In 1684, William III purchased the medieval castle Het Oude Loo . In its vicinity, he constructed a new summer palace called Het Loo by the design of the architects Jacob Roman and Johan van Swieten. This became the main hunting seat in the Veluwe with Dieren as its satellite or get-away when the Loo was too crowded, like the Trianon palaces to Versailles . Other estates acquired were Hoog-Soeren in 1676, Asselt in 1692, Hoog Buurlo in 1700 and Coldenhove Castle in 1701. William III wanted the latter to also become an impressive hunting lodge like Het Loo. The architect Daniel Marot makes designs for a castle and imposing gardens, but during its re-construction the castle burned down. William and Mary also stayed at the houses their entourage had at the Veluwe, like Middachten Castle of Godert de Ginkel, 1st Earl of Athlone, huis De Voorst of Arnold van Keppel, 1st Earl of Albemarle, or the castle in Rozendaal.

After the Glorious Revolution of 1688, William and Mary became king of queen of England, Ireland, and Scotland in 1689. This triggered a second rebuilding campaign of the Hof te Dieren to make it suitable for royalty. Although, the exterior was unassuming, the interior was lavish and far richer than could be gauged from the outside. There were apartments for close confidants like Arnold van Keppel. The rooms contained many paintings over the doors and chimney pieces by Jakob Bogdani.

=== 18th Century ===
After the death of William III, the hunting lodge and estate at Dieren are inherited by John William Friso, prince of Orange (1687-1711). He was succeeded by his son, William IV, Prince of Orange (1711-1751). They did not spend as much time at Dieren as William III and Mary. William IV was married to Anna, Princess Royal (1709-1759). Between 1757 and 1763, she created a forest to the north side of Dieren with hills named after her children, Prince William V and Princess Carolina. William V, Prince of Orange (1748-1806) did not often visit the Hof te Dieren. Still he expanded the domain by acquiring neighbouring estates.

During the Batavian Revolution, Prince William V left the Netherlands. The revolutionaries confiscated the house and estate in 1795. When French soldiers were billeting at the house, the hunting lodge burned down completely and its furnishings were lost. Nothing remains anymore of the pleasure house, except a wall, which once enclosed the gardens.

=== Van Wassenaer Obdam/ Van Heeckeren van Wassenaer ===
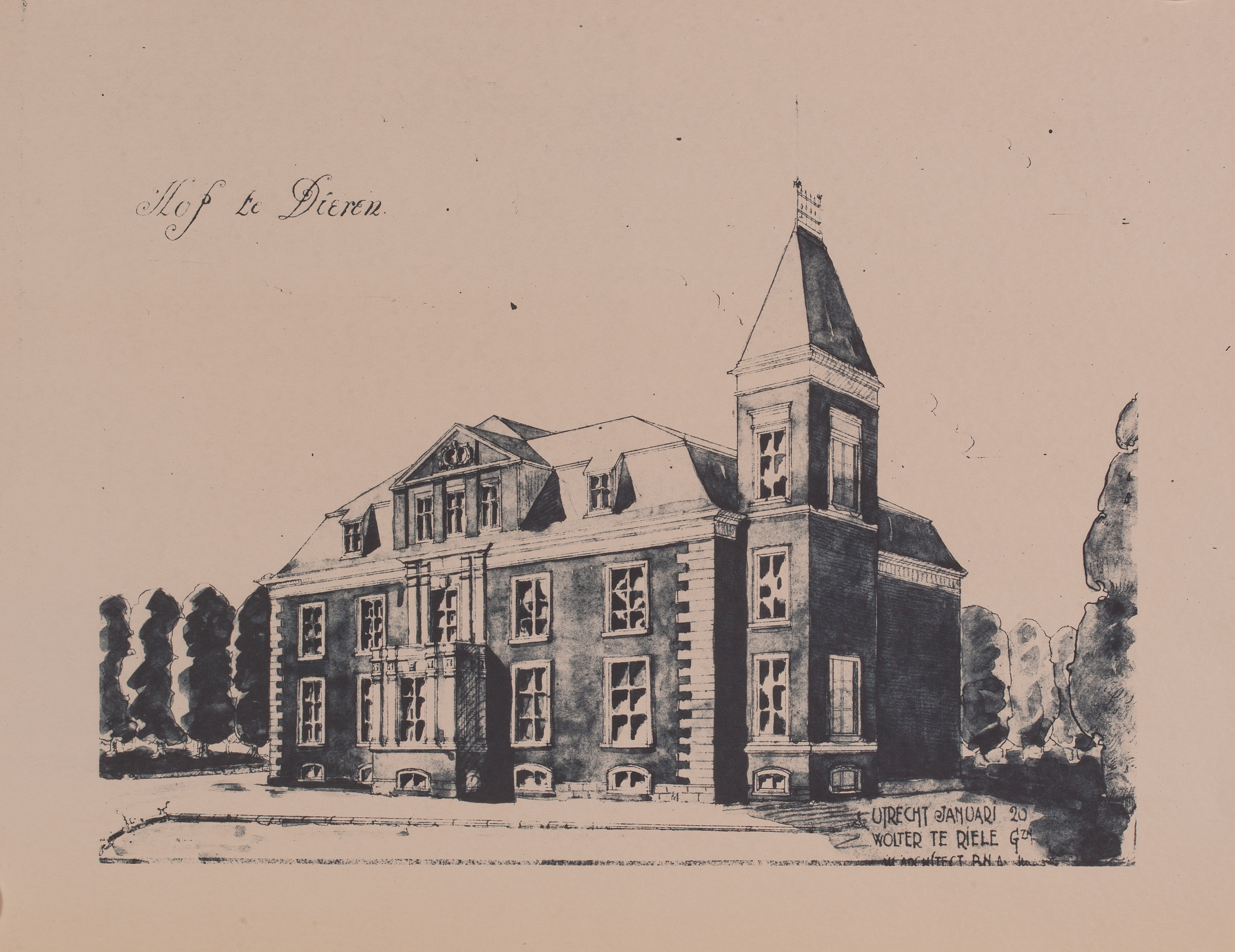
The 19th century manor house was destroyed by accident at the end of the Second World War

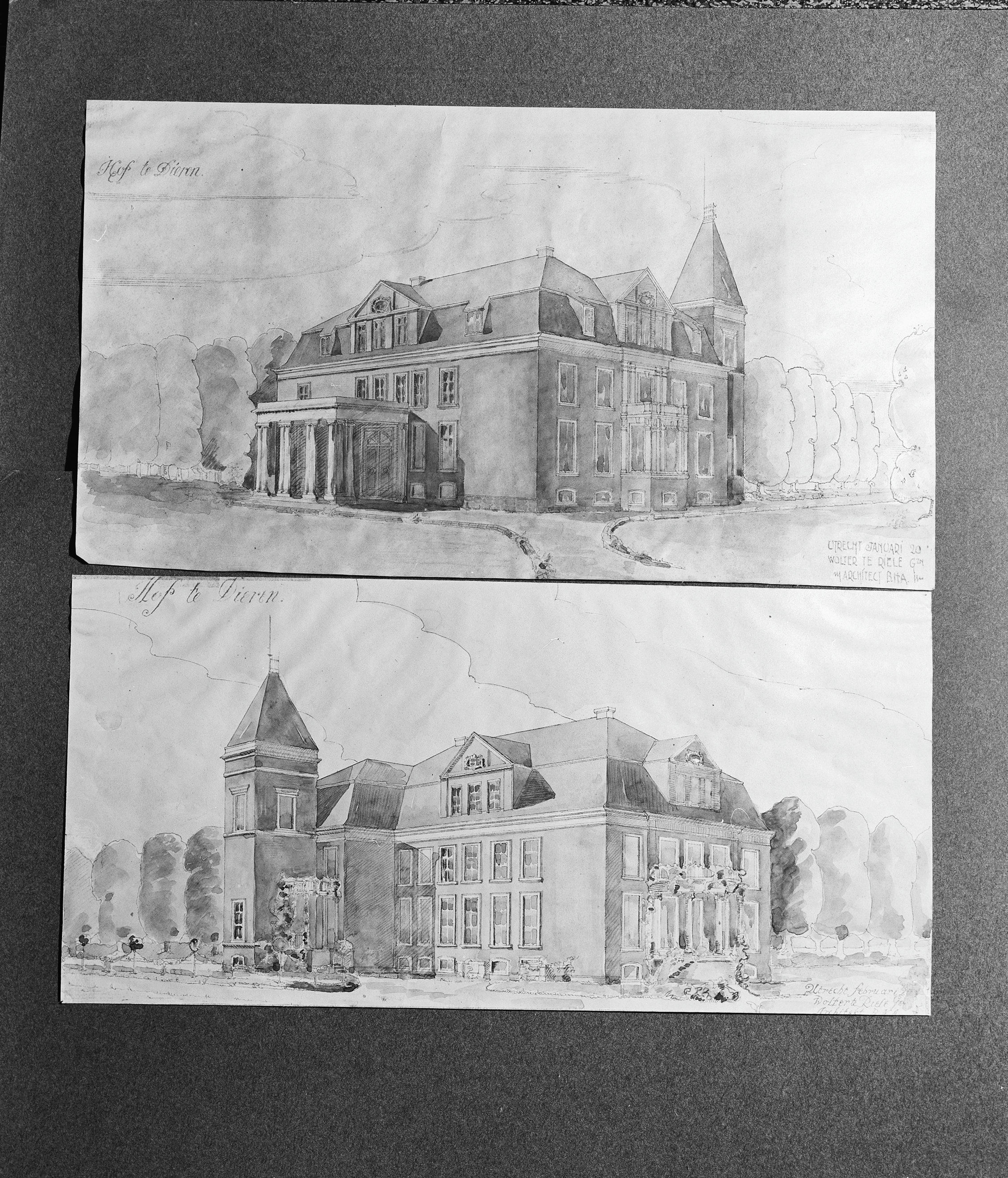
The 19th century manor house

Marie Cornélie countes of Wassenaer Obdam (1799-1850), owner of Twickel Castle, acquired the Hof te Dieren estate in 1821. She constructed a new manor house in Gothic Revival style, which barely 25 years later was already modernized in more eclectic style. The house was at the centre of an English landscape park designed by Jan David Zocher and Eduard Petzold .

In 1877, the estate was inherited by Rodolphe Frédéric, baron van Heeckeren van Wassenaer. His main residence was the castle in Twickel. The house at Dieren was only used as a second home. Still, the house and the park were well maintained.

In the Second World War, the German occupation force confiscated the house for own use. On 28 December 1944, a fire started in the upper rooms of the house as German soldiers started a fire on the floor due to a lock of stoves. The local fire brigade did not cooperate in fighting the fire. As a result, the entire house burned down. The ruins were demolished in 1965. Where the manor house once stood, a shallow pit is visible in the park.

=== Twickel Foundation ===
In 1953, the Twickel Foundation was established with the aim of preserving Twickel as a nature reserve and as a cultural and historical monument. Fort this purpose, the last baroness van Heeckeren van Wassenaer contributed Twickel Castle, its furniture, collections and archive, the accompanying forests and farms to the foundation. When she died in 1975, all her remaining private estates were also transferred by bequest to the Twickel Foundation. Part of this bequest was Hof te Dieren. The Foundation is the owner up to the current day. It operates the Dieren estate as a plant nursery and vineyard. It is open to the general public. The foundation is considering constructing an apartment building in the center of the park.

== Literature ==
- Schellart, A.I.J.M. (1984). Huizen van Oranje Verblijven van de Oranjes en de Nassaus in Nederland (in Dutch). Rijswijk: Elmar. ISBN 90-6120402X.
- van Raaij, Stefan; Spies, Paul (1988). The Royal Progress of William & Mary. Darts. ISBN 978-9067071918.
- Harenberg, J (1981). Kruijswijk-Jansen, E.J. (ed.). "Een bezoek aan het Hof te Dieren op 21 juli 1705" (PDF). Mededelingen van de Oudheidkundige Kring 'Rheden-Roozendaal' (in Dutch). 69: 2–5.
- Ten Houten, Lillianne (2005). "Hof te Dieren van jachtslot tot lusthof" (PDF). Ambt & Heerlijkheid Mededelingen van de Oudheidkundige Kring 'Rheden-Roozendaal' (in Dutch). 51–148: 24–32.
- Renes, Hans (2005). "Wildparken in Nederland Sporen van een oude vorm van faunabeheer" (PDF). Tijdschrift voor Historische Geografie (in Dutch): 21–34.
- Olde Meierink, Ben; Storms-Smeets, Elyze (2015). "Adellijke en burgerlijke buitenplaatsen in Gelderland". In Kuiper, Yme; Olde Meierink, Ben (eds.). Buitenplaatsen in de Gouden Eeuw De rijkdom van het buitenleven in de Republiek (in Dutch). Hilversum: Verloren. pp. 178–207. ISBN 978-9087045388.
- Haverman, Merel (2018). William III The practical author of the palatial landscape in The Netherlands and England 1672-1702 (Thesis). Amsterdam: Universiteit van Amsterdam.
- Bijster, Peter (2019). Snelwegen voor de Koning Een onderzoek naar koningswegen op de Veluwe aangelegd tussen 1675 en 1702 ten behoeve van (Koning-)Stadhouder Willem III (PDF) (Thesis) (in Dutch). Groningen: Rijksuniversiteit Groningen.
- Ronnes, Hanneke; Haverman, Merel (2020). "A Reappraisal of the Architectural Legacy of King-Stadholder William III and Queen Mary II: Taste, Passion and Frenzy". The Court Historian. 25 (2): 158–177. doi:10.1080/14629712.2020.1777720. hdl:11245.1/baa15552-e178-4f41-a70b-fa054628f100.

== Gallery: A tour of the Hof te Dieren and its gardens by Pieter Schenk ==
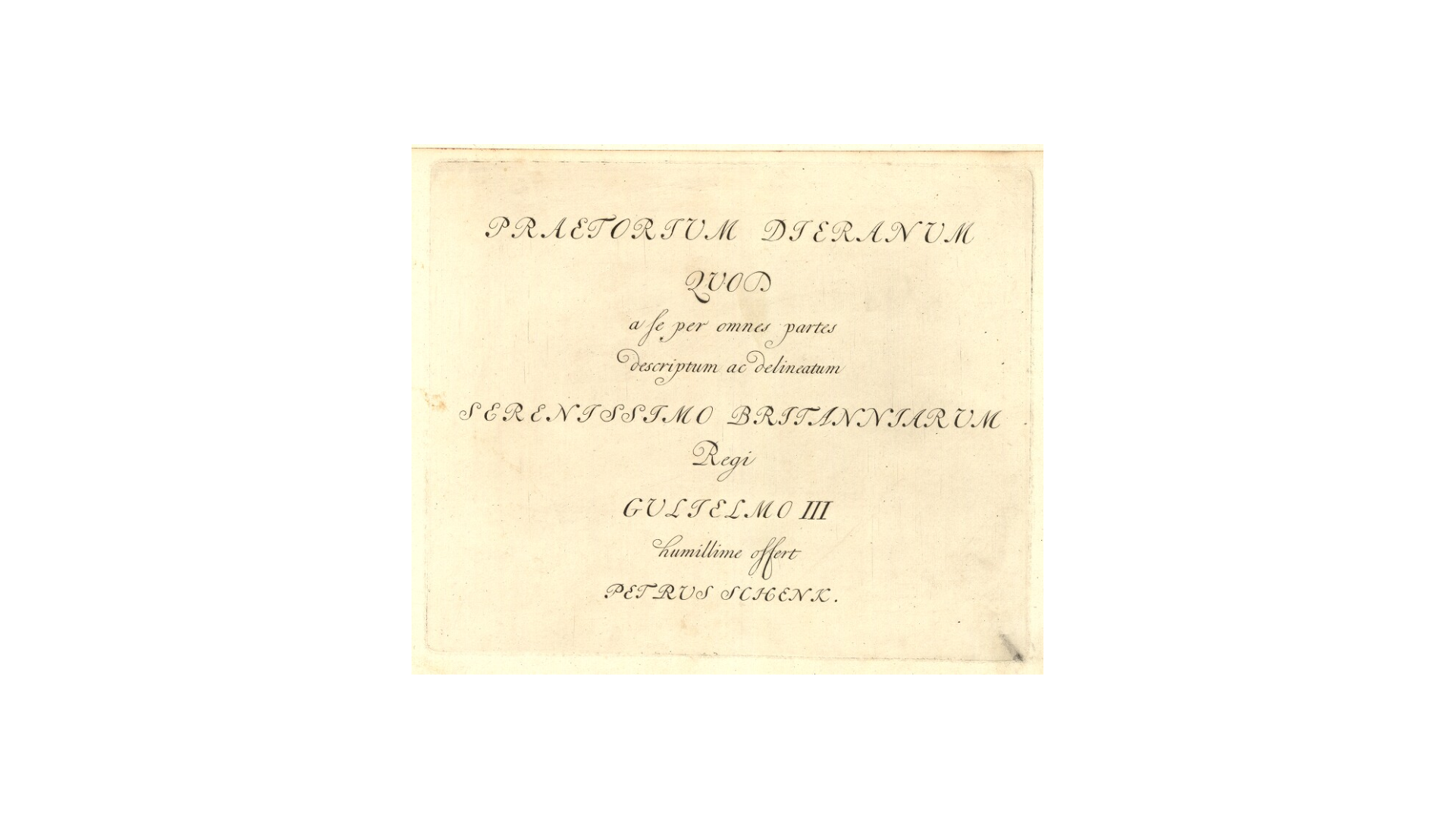
Cover of the Praetorium Dieranum by Pieter Schenk

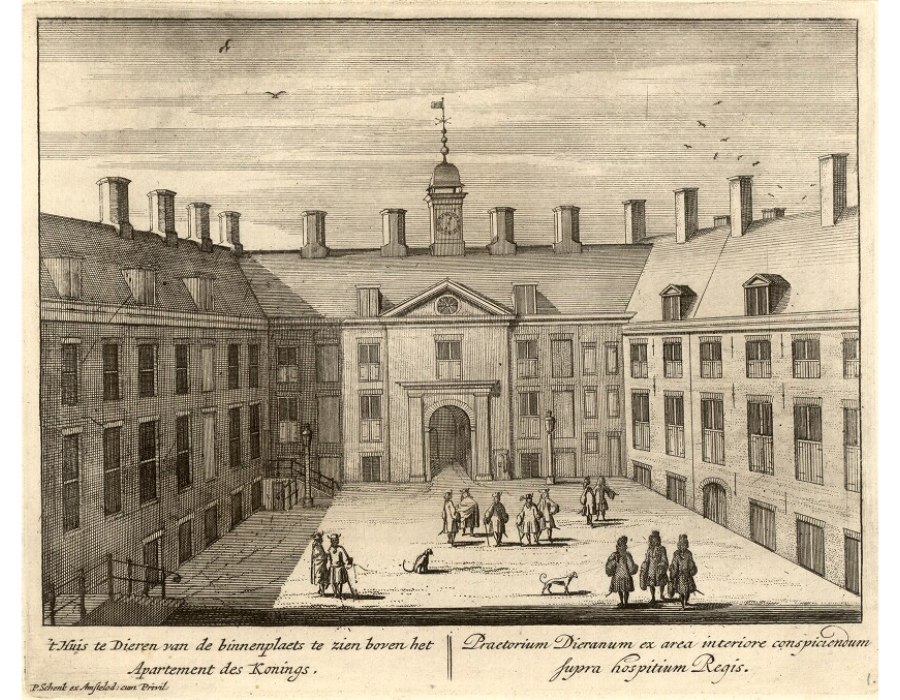
View of the courtyard of the house

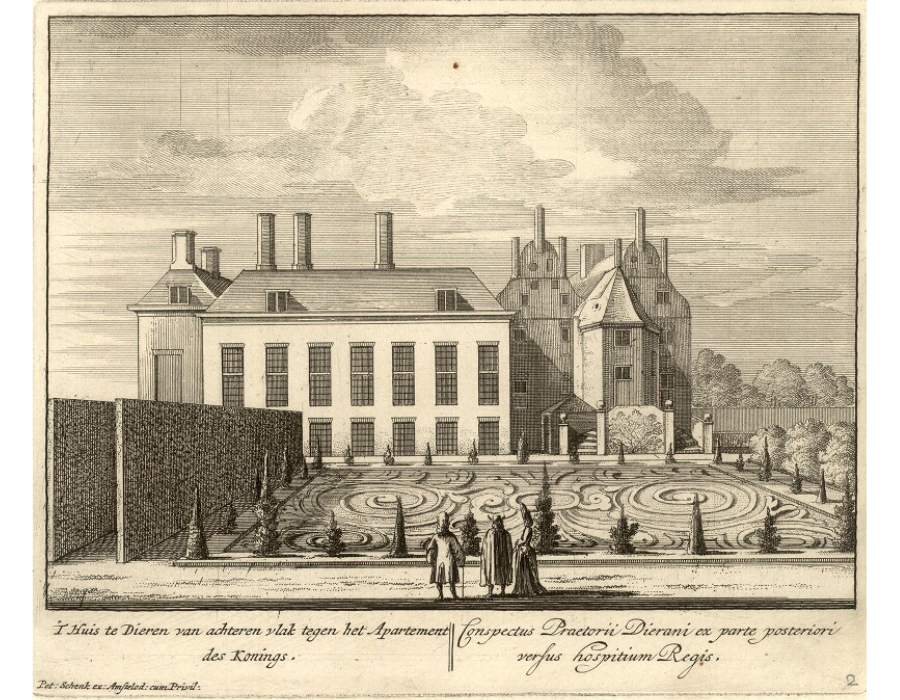
View of the garden side of the house

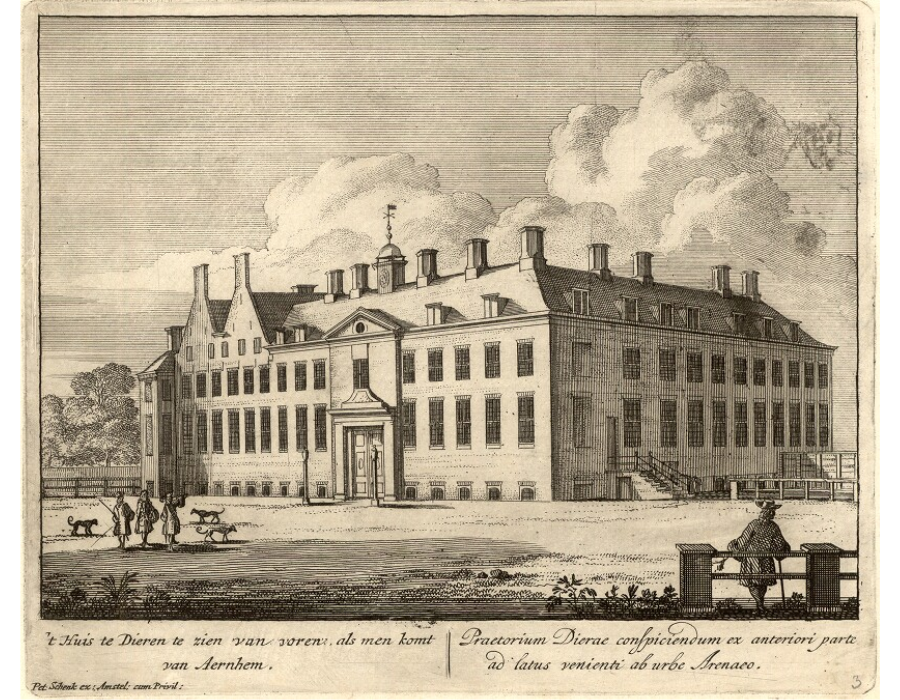
View of the front of the house (North and westside)

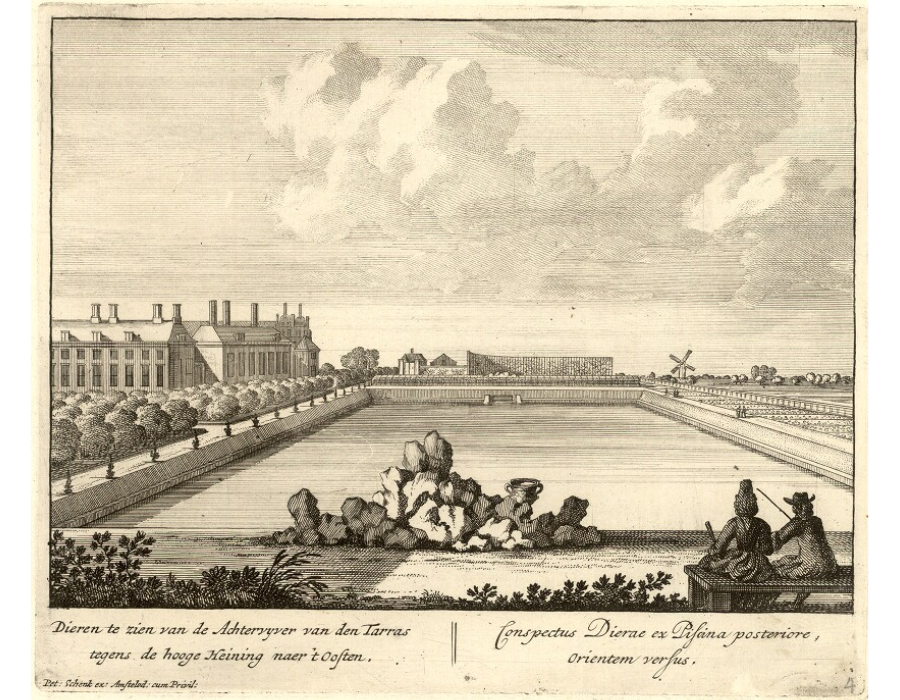
View of the garden side of the house and the pond

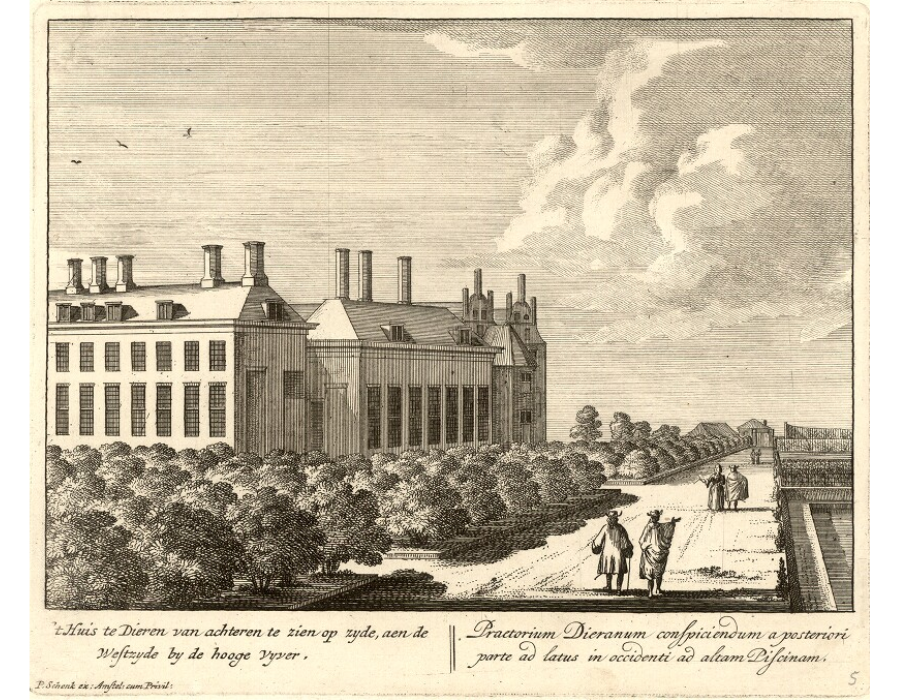
View of the westside of the house

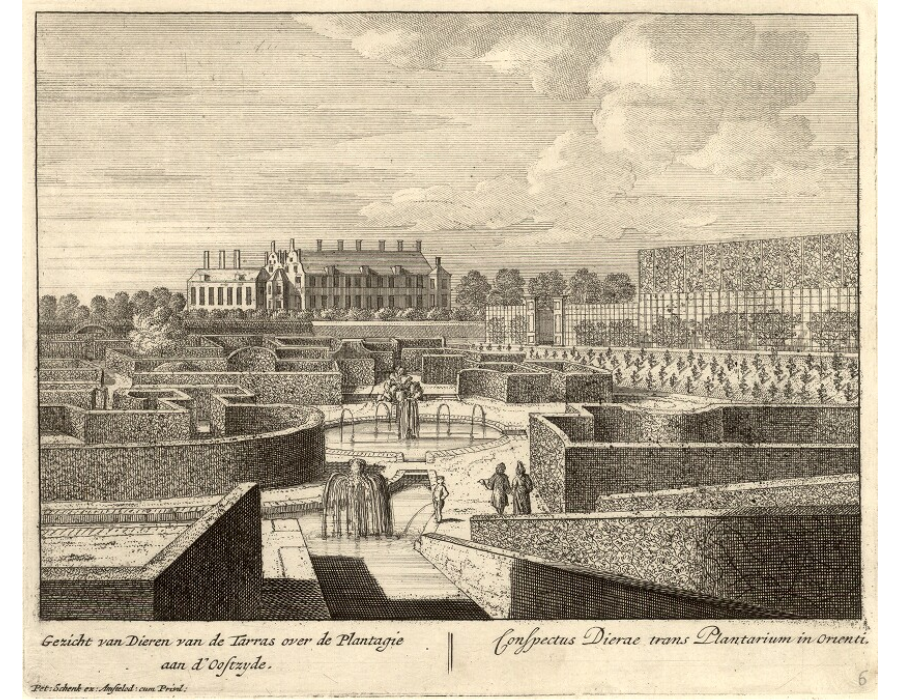
View of the house overlooking the garden

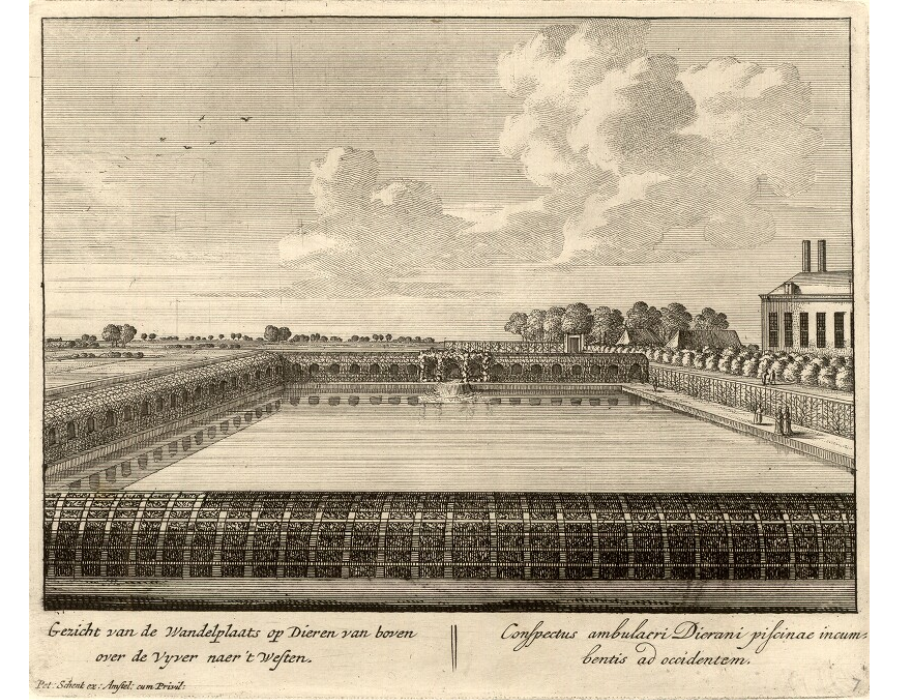
View of the pond

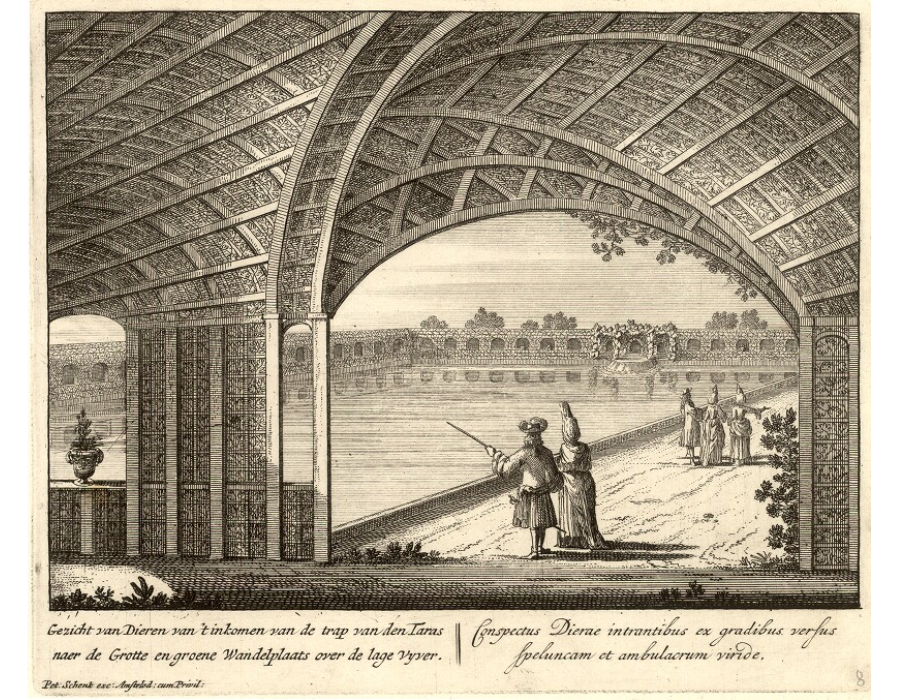
View of the pond

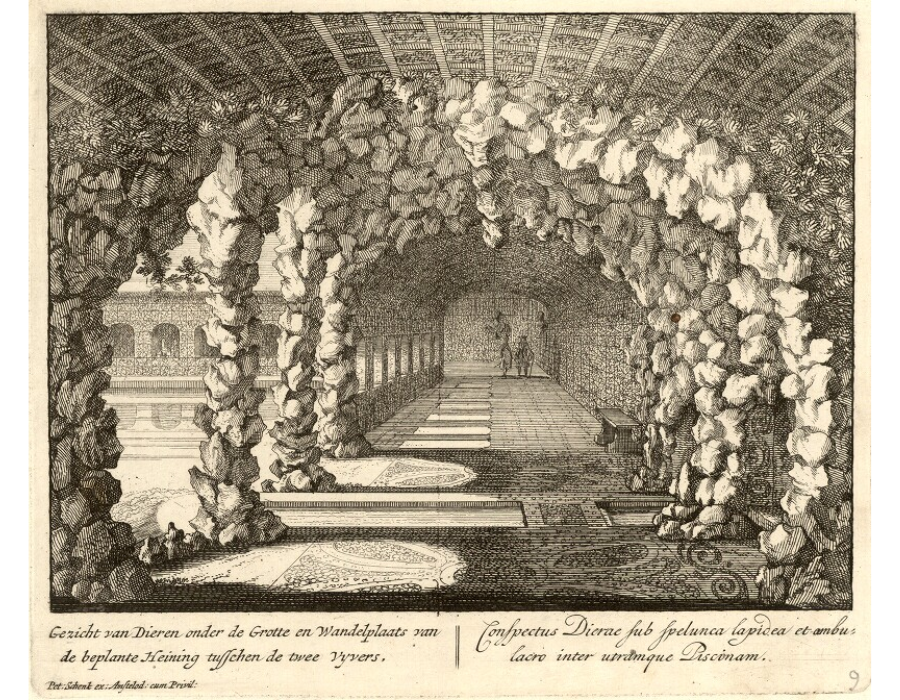
View of the grotto and the covered path between the ponds

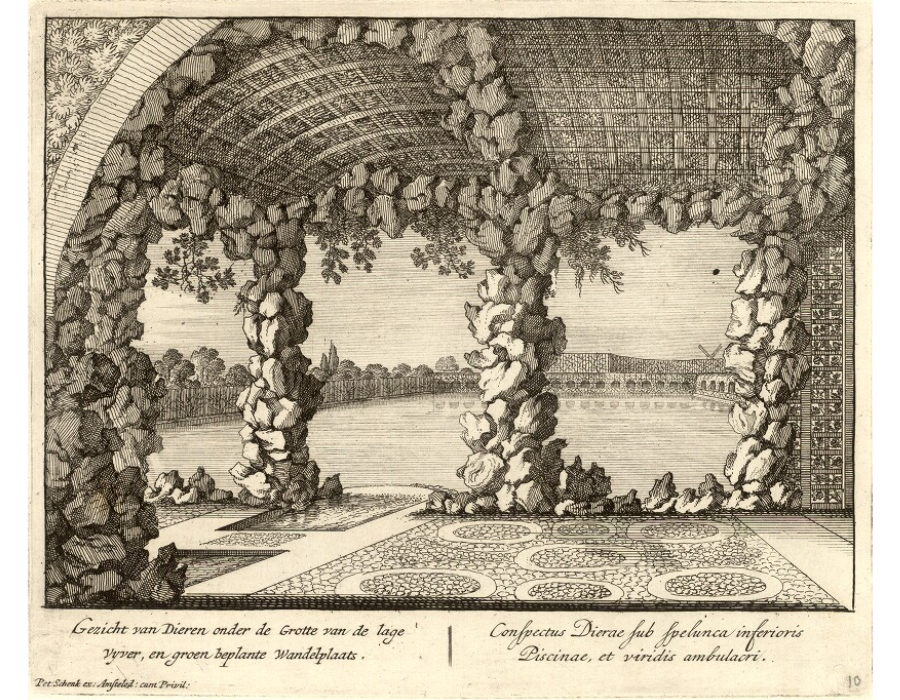
View from the grotto to the pond

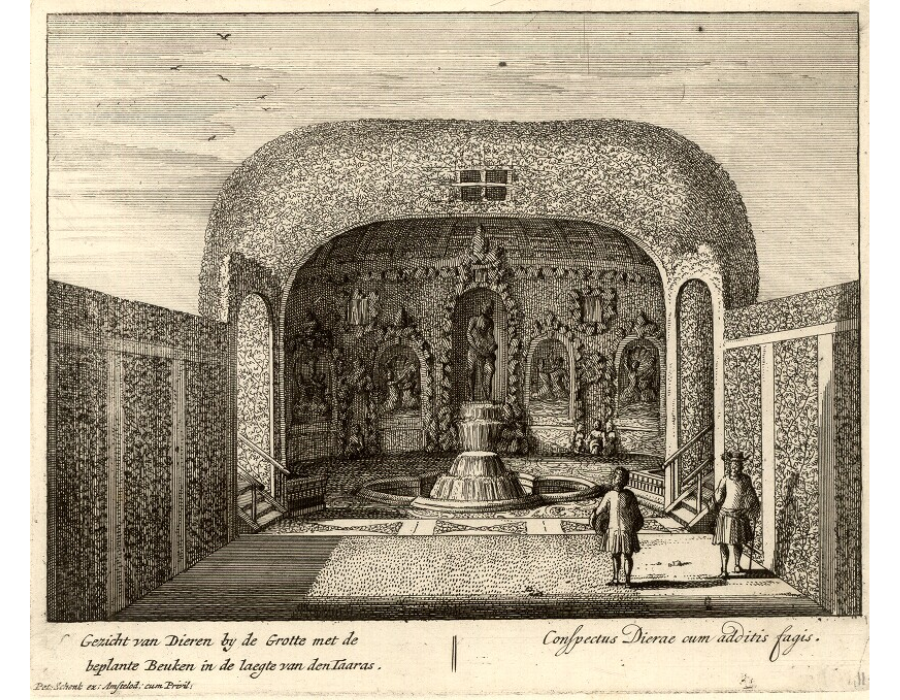
View of the Venus cave

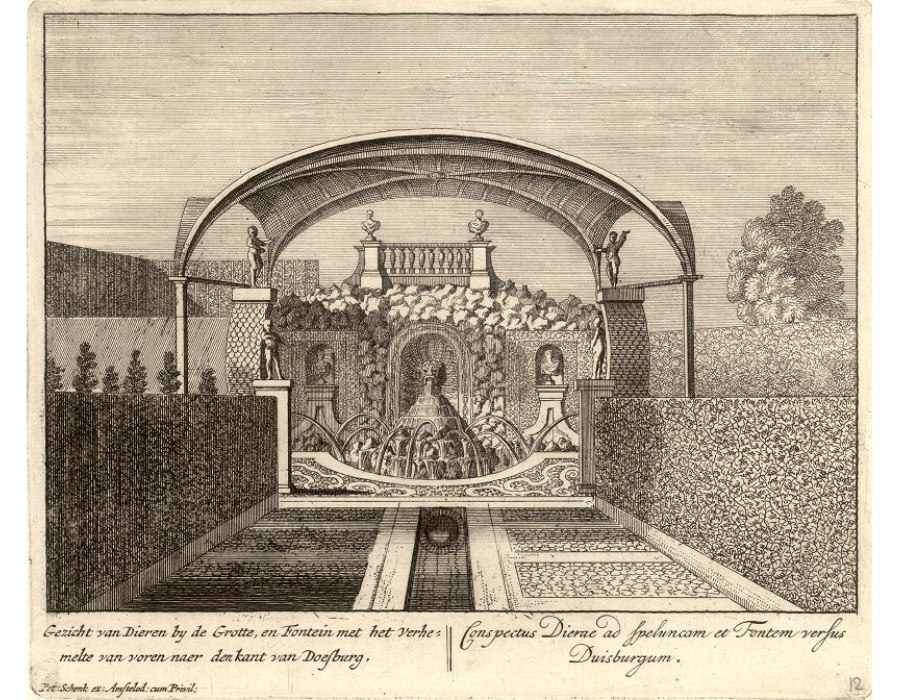
View of the grotto

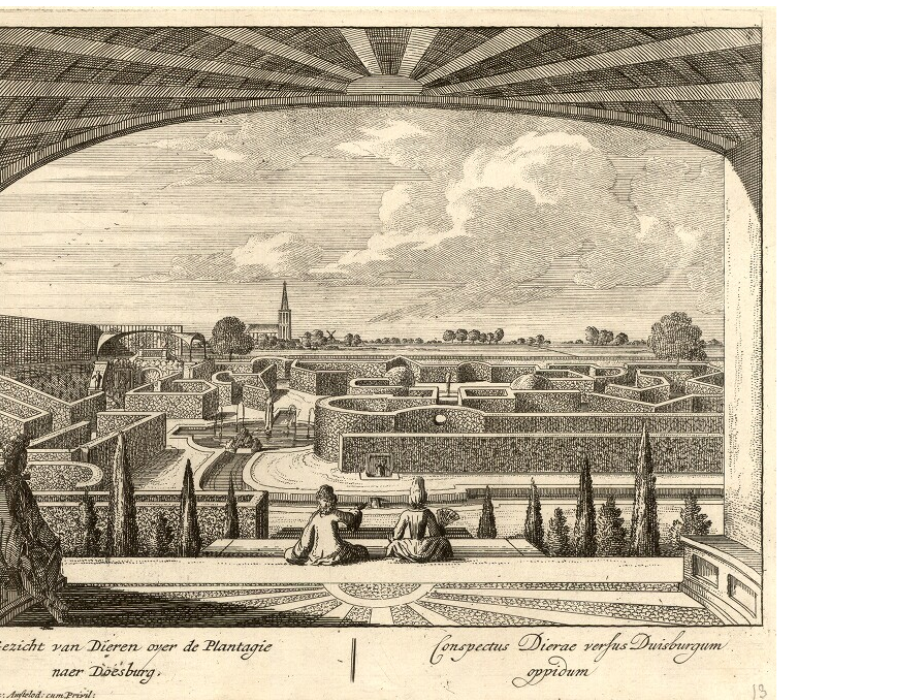
View of the labyrinth

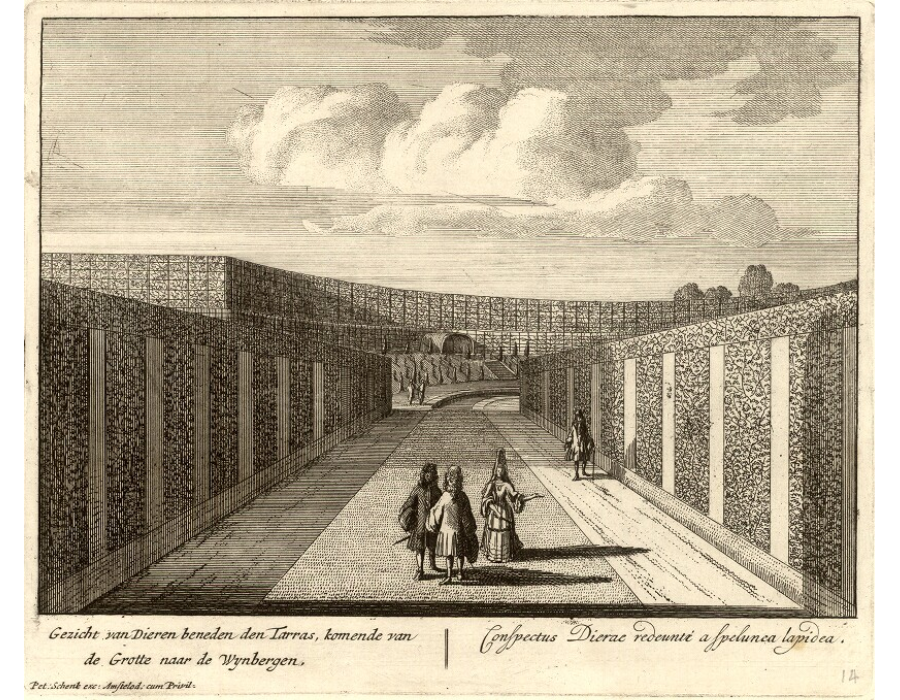
View of the garden

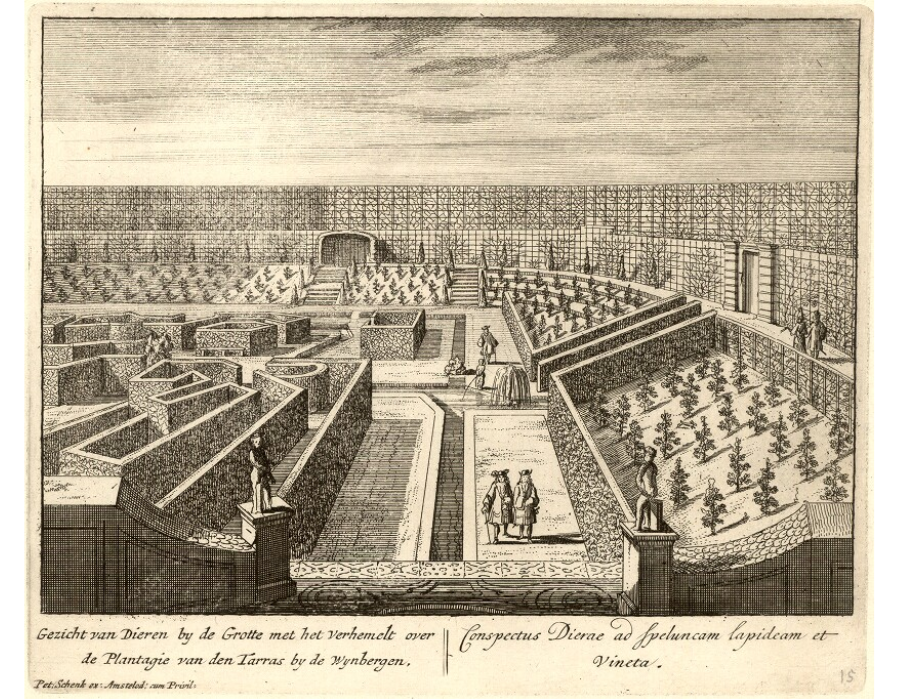
View of the labyrinth

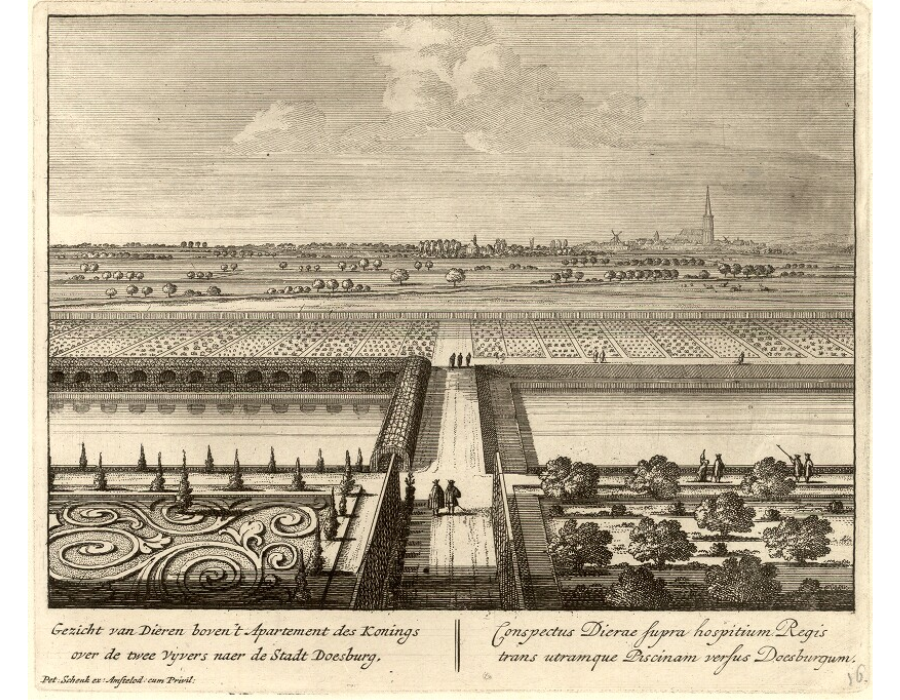
View from the Kings apartment
