= Schultz =

Schultz is a German and Dutch surname derived from Schultheiß, meaning village headman or constable/sheriff in the medieval sense (akin to today's office of mayor). It has many variations, such as Schuldt, Schulte, Schulten, Schultes, Schultheis, Schultheiss, Schultheiß, Schultze, Schulz, Schulze and Schulzke. Adapted spellings in other languages include Shultz, Šulc and Szulc.

In Silesia, the "u" was often replaced by "o"; see also Scholz and Scholtz.

Notable people with this form of the surname include:

== People ==
- Albert Schultz (born 1963), Canadian actor
- Alby Schultz (1939–2015), Australian politician
- Ana María Schultz (born 1935), Argentine freestyle swimmer
- Andrew Schultz (born 1960), Australian classical composer
- Arthur Schultz (1933–2011), American politician
- Barney Schultz (1926–2015), American baseball player
- Bill Schultz (producer) (born 1960), American animation producer
- Bill Schultz (Fender) (1926–2006), American engineer and business executive, CEO of Fender Musical Instruments Corporation
- Bill Schultz (American football) (born 1967), American football offensive lineman
- Brenda Schultz-McCarthy (born 1970), Dutch tennis player
- Brett Schultz (born 1970), South African cricketer
- Bud Schultz (born 1959), American tennis player
- Carl Schultz (disambiguation)
- Charles Schultz (disambiguation)
- Claire Kelly Schultz (1924–2015), American information scientist
- Connie Schultz (born 1957), American journalist
- Dalton Schultz (born 1996), American football player
- Daniel Schultz (1615–1683), Polish painter
- David Schultz (disambiguation), several people
- Debbie Wasserman Schultz (born 1966), American politician
- Dick Schultz (born 1929), American college sports coach and administrator
- Don Schultz (1936–2020), American chess administrator
- Don E. Schultz (1934–2020), American marketing expert
- Donald Schultz (born 1978), South African naturalist and entertainer, working with dangerous species
- Dutch Schultz (1902–1935), American gangster
- Dwight Schultz (born 1947), American actor
- Ed Schultz (1954–2018), American broadcaster
- Friedrich Wilhelm Schultz (1804–1876), German pharmacist and botanist
- Graeme Schultz (born 1953), Australian Rules footballer
- Harald Schultz (1895–1957), German general during World War II
- Heinie Schultz, American football player
- Heinrich Schultz (1924–2012), Estonian cultural functionary
- Helen M. Schultz (1898–1974), American bus company founder
- Helga Schultz (1941—2016), German historian
- Henry Schultz (1893–1938), American economist
- Henry A. Schultz (1844–1916), American politician from Maryland
- Henry J. Schultz (1910–2008), American politician from Pennsylvania
- Hermann Schultz (1836–1903), German theologian
- Howard Schultz (born 1953), American businessman
- Howard Schultz (producer) (died 2014), American television producer
- Issa Schultz (born 1984), Australian quiz champion and one of the Chasers on The Chase Australia
- Ivan Schultz (1891–1974), Canadian politician
- Jaime Schultz (born 1991), American baseball player
- James Willard Schultz (1859–1947), Apukuni, American author, hunter, trader and guide
- Joe Schultz Jr. (1918–1996), American baseball player, coach, and manager
- Joe Schultz (outfielder) (1893–1941), American baseball player
- Johannes Schultz (composer) (1582–1653), German composer
- Johannes Heinrich Schultz (1884–1970), German psychiatrist
- John Schultz (disambiguation), several people
- Johnathan Schultz (born 1982), South African visual artist
- Justin Schultz (born 1990), Canadian hockey player
- Karl Schultz (born 1937), German equestrian and Olympian
- Karl L. Schultz, US Coast Guard admiral
- Keith and Kevin Schultz (born 1953), American identical twin child actors, singers and photographers
- Lachie Schultz (born 1997), Australian rules footballer
- Lenny Schultz (1933–2025), American comedian
- Leonard Peter Schultz (1901–1986), American ichthyologist
- Mark Schultz (disambiguation), several people
- Martha Gorman Schultz (1931–2025), Diné weaver
- Martin Schultz (disambiguation), several people
- Michael Schultz (born 1938), American director and producer
- Michael Schultz (gallerist) (1951–2021), German gallerist
- Michael Schultz (footballer) (born 1993), German footballer
- Nick Schultz (ice hockey) (born 1982), Canadian ice hockey player
- Noah Schultz (born 2003), American baseball player
- Peter Schultz (disambiguation), several people
- Philip Schultz (born 1945), American Pulitzer Prize winning poet
- Richard Schultz (1926–2021), American furniture designer
- Robert Weir Schultz (1860–1951), Scottish architect
- Ron Schultz (born 1938), politician from Florida
- Scout Schultz (1996–2017), American computer student and LGBTQ activist
- Sheldon Schultz (1933–2017), American physicist
- Tanja Schultz, German computer scientist
- Theodore Schultz (1902–1998), American economist
- Walter Schultz (disambiguation), several people

== Fictional characters ==
- Dr. King Schultz, from the 2012 film Django Unchained
- Herman Schultz, the alias of the Marvel Comics character Shocker
- Maggie Schultz, protagonist of the Beverly Cleary book Muggie Maggie
- Molly Schultz, is a character from the 2013 video game Grand Theft Auto V
- Nick Schultz, in the Australian TV series Blue Heelers
- Schultz, from the Looney Tunes' 1943 short Daffy the Commando
- Schultz, in the Battle Arena Toshinden fighting game series
- Sergeant Hans Schultz, in the TV series Hogan's Heroes
- Charmaine "Schultzy" Schultz, secretary on The Bob Cummings Show

== See also ==
- Schultz, West Virginia
