= List of the most common surnames in Germany =

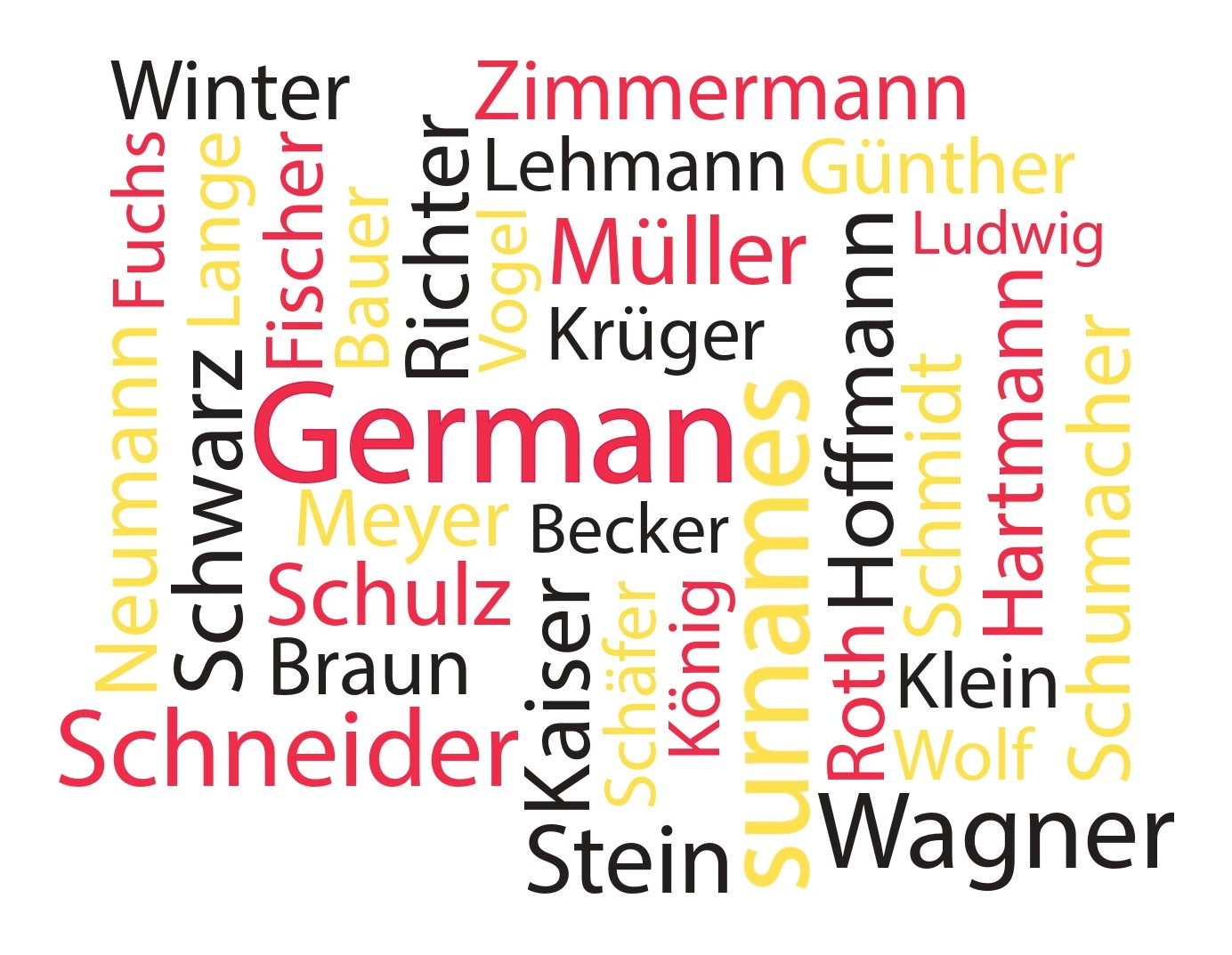
Image of some of the most common German surnames.

== List of the most common surnames in Germany ==
Data updated to 12 February 2021.

1. Müller, occupation (miller)
2. Schmidt, occupation (smith)
3. Schneider, occupation (tailor)
4. Fischer, occupation (fisherman)
5. Weber, occupation (weaver)
6. Meyer, occupation (originally a manorial landlord, later a self-employed farmer)
7. Wagner, occupation (wainwright)
8. Becker, occupation (baker)
9. Schulz, occupation (medieval mayor)
10. Hoffmann, occupation (steward or courtier)
11. Schäfer, occupation (shepherd)
12. Koch, occupation (cook)
13. Bauer, occupation (farmer or peasant)
14. Richter, occupation (judge)
15. Klein, trait ("small", "short" )
16. Wolf, perhaps derived from forename (e.g. Wolf, Wolfgang, etc.) or trait ("wolf-like")
17. Schröder, occupation (tailor or wine shipper)
18. Neumann, trait ("new")
19. Schwarz, trait ("black-haired")
20. Zimmermann, occupation (carpenter)
21. Braun, trait ("brown-haired") or forename (Brunhold)
22. Krüger, occupation (innkeeper)
23. Hofmann, occupation (steward or courtier)
24. Hartmann, forename
25. Lange, trait ("tall")
26. Schmitt, occupation (smith)
27. Werner, forename
28. Schmitz, occupation (smith)
29. Krause, trait ("curly haired")
30. Meier, occupation (originally a manorial landlord, later a self-employed farmer)
31. Lehmann, occupation/class (vassal)
32. Schmid, occupation (smith)
33. Schulze, occupation (medieval mayor)
34. Maier, occupation (originally a manorial landlord, later a self-employed farmer)
35. Köhler, occupation (charcoal-maker)
36. Herrmann, forename
37. König, house name ("king")
38. Walter, forename
39. Mayer, occupation (originally a manorial landlord, later a self-employed farmer)
40. Huber, occupation (farmer)
41. Kaiser, house name ("emperor")
42. Fuchs, trait ("fox hunter" or "fox-like")
43. Peters, forename Peter + s, which in North Germany means "son of"
44. Lang, trait ("tall")
45. Scholz, occupation (medieval mayor)
46. Möller, occupation (miller)
47. Weiß, trait ("white-haired" or "white-skinned")
48. Jung, trait ("young")
49. Hahn, "rooster", or possibly a condensation of Johannes
50. Schubert, occupation (shoemaker), derived from Middle High German Schuochwürhte
51. Vogel, house name ("bird")
52. Friedrich, forename composed of Old High German fridu ("peace") and rîhhi ("rich, realm")
53. Keller, occupation (winemaker)
54. Günther, forename
55. Frank, tribe (Franks)
56. Berger, house name ("mountain")
57. Winkler, occupation (grocer)
58. Roth, trait ("red-haired")
59. Beck, occupation (baker) or house name ("stream")
60. Lorenz, forename
61. Baumann, occupation (farmer or peasant)
62. Franke, tribe (Franks)
63. Albrecht, forename
64. Schuster, occupation (shoemaker)
65. Simon, forename
66. Ludwig, forename
67. Böhm, nation (Bohemian)
68. Winter, related to winter
69. Kraus, trait ("curly-haired")
70. Martin, forename
71. Schumacher, occupation (shoemaker)
72. Krämer, occupation (grocer, peddler or chandler)
73. Vogt, occupation (bailiff)
74. Stein, house name ("stone")
75. Jäger, occupation (hunter)
76. Otto, forename
77. Sommer, related to summer
78. Groß, trait ("big")
79. Seidel, perhaps derived from forename (e.g. Siegfried, Sieghart, etc.)
80. Heinrich, forename
81. Brandt, related to fire
82. Haas, house name ("hare")
83. Schreiber, occupation (scrivener)
84. Graf, occupation (count)
85. Schulte, occupation (medieval mayor)
86. Dietrich, forename composed of Old High German diot ("people") and rihhi ("mighty"), meaning "ruler of people"
87. Ziegler, occupation (brickmaker)
88. Kuhn, perhaps derived from forename (Konrad)
89. Kühn, trait ("brave")
90. Pohl, nation, "Pole" "originating from or related to Poland"
91. Engel, forename or house name ("angel")
92. Horn, house name ("horn")
93. Busch, house name ("shrub")
94. Bergmann, occupation (miner)
95. Thomas, forename
96. Voigt, occupation (bailiff)
97. Sauer, trait ("grim")
98. Arnold, forename
99. Wolff, perhaps derived from forename (e.g. Wolf, Wolfgang, etc.) or trait ("wolf-like")
100. ”Bender”, derived from the occupational surname Fassbender, meaning Cooper.
101. Pfeiffer, occupation (piper)

=== Regional differences ===
Although Müller is the most common name in German-speaking countries, in some areas other surnames are more frequent than Müller. The common names Schmidt and Schmitz lead in the central German-speaking and eastern Low German-speaking areas. Meyer is particularly common in the Low German-speaking regions, especially in Lower Saxony (where it is more common than Müller). Bauer leads in eastern Upper German-speaking Bavaria. Rarer names tend to accumulate in the north and south. Huber is common in southern Bavaria and is, with the exception of Munich, the most frequent name in that area. Patronymic surnames such as Jansen/Janssen, Hansen, and Petersen are the most common names in the far north (Lower Saxony and Schleswig-Holstein).

=== Slavic names ===
Due to the historical settlement of Slavs, Slavic names are most common in Saxony, Brandenburg, and Mecklenburg-Vorpommern (especially in Lusatia, where Sorbs continue to reside today). About 13% of the German population today has names of Slavic origin. Many Austrians also have surnames of Slavic origin.

Polish names in Germany abound as a result of over 100,000 people (including 130,000 "Ruhrpolen") immigrating westward from the Polish-speaking areas of the German Empire. Many Polish-named Germans reside in the Ruhr region of North Rhine-Westphalia and Berlin, though they are mostly "Germanized" by form (e.g. Orlowski, Schimanski, Rudzinski, Kowalski, Schymanietz, Matuszek to Matussek or Mattner, Koslowski, etc.).

- 157. Nowak (Polish)
- 270. Noack (Sorbian)
- 435. Pietsch

=== Turkish names ===
The large number of Turkish immigrants to Germany accounts for the frequency of Turkish surnames.

- 587. Yılmaz
- 938. Kaya

=== Names of other origins ===
Because many Vietnamese sought asylum in West Germany or guest work in East Germany during and after the Vietnam War, and because approximately 40% of the Vietnamese population carry one particular name, the surname Nguyen is notably common in Germany.

- 815. Nguyen

== See also ==
- German name

== Literature ==
- Duden: Familiennamen, Herkunft und Bedeutung von 20.000 Nachnamen. ISBN 3-411-70852-2.
- dtv-Atlas: Namenkunde. ISBN 3-423-03234-0.
- Hans Bahlow: Deutsches Namenlexikon. München 1967, ISBN 3-8112-2271-6.
- Max Gottschald: Deutsche Namenkunde. 5. Aufl., Berlin 1982, ISBN 3-11-008618-2.
- Josef Karlmann Brechenmacher: Etymologisches Wörterbuch der deutschen Familiennamen. ISBN 3-7980-0355-6.
- Horst Naumann: Das große Buch der Familiennamen. Alter, Herkunft, Bedeutung. Augsburg 2005, ISBN 3-8289-1955-3.
- Ernst Schwarz: Deutsche Namenforschung. Band 1: Ruf- und Familiennamen, Band 2: Orts- und Flurnamen, Göttingen 1950.
