= Šulc =

- Pronunciation: Czech pronunciation: [ˈʃults]

Origin
- Language: German → Czech
- Meaning: From German: Schulz
- Region of origin: Czech lands

Other names
- Variant forms: Schulz, Schulze, Schultz, Schulzke; Shultz, Szulc, Šolc

Šulc (feminine Šulcová) is a Czech and Slovak surname, a version of the German family name Schulz. Notable people with the surname include:

- Alan Šulc (born 1990), world record–holding juggler
- Brigita Šulcová (born 1937), Czech opera singer
- František Šulc (born 1950), Czech former handball player
- František Šulc Jr. (born 1978), Slovak handball player, son of František Šulc (born 1950)
- Jakub Šulc (born 1985), Czech professional ice hockey defenceman
- Jan Šulc (canoeist) (1916–2001), Czechoslovak slalom canoer
- Jan Šulc (footballer) (born 1998), Czech footballer
- Jan Šulc (ice hockey) (born 1979), Czech former professional ice hockey centre
- Jana Šulcová (1947–2023), Czech actress
- Jaroslav Šulc (1903–1943), Czech paleontologist, executed by the Nazis
- Jaroslav Šulc (1903–1977), Czech writer
- Pavel Šulc (born 2000), Czech footballer
