= Schulte =

Schulte is a German surname, derived from the word Schultheiß. Variants of the surname include Scholte, Schuldt, Schultens and Schultze.

Notable people with the surname include:

- Adolf Schulte (1894-1917), German flying ace
- Aloysius Schulte, St. Ambrose University president
- Dieter Schulte (1940–2022), German labor leader
- Eduard Schulte (1891–1966), German industrialist
- Edward J. Schulte (1890–1975), American architect
- Eike Wilm Schulte (1939–2025), German operatic baritone
- Francis B. Schulte (1926–2016), American archbishop
- Frank Schulte (1882–1949), American baseball player
- Fred Schulte (1901–1983), American baseball player
- Fritz Schulte (1890–1943), German politician
- Greg Schulte, American sportscaster
- Gregory Schulte, American ambassador to the International Atomic Energy Agency
- Henry Schulte, college football coach
- Jim Schulte, American politician
- Johann Friedrich von Schulte (1827–1914), German legal historian and professor of canon law
- Johnny Schulte (1896–1978), American baseball player
- Joshua Schulte (born 1988), CIA employee, convicted of leaking documents
- Mary Leontius Schulte (1901–2000), American nun, mathematics educator, and historian of mathematics
- Michael Schulte (born 1990), German singer and songwriter
- Quinn Schulte (born 2000), American football player
- Patricia Schulte, Canadian zoologist
- Paxton Schulte (born 1972), ice hockey player
- Ursula Schulte (born 1952), German politician
- Wildfire Schulte (1882–1949), American baseball player

== See also ==
- Julius Schulte-Frohlinde (1894–1968), Nazi German architect
- Heike Schulte-Mattler (born 1959), German athlete
- Schulte, Kansas, an unincorporated community in Kansas, United States
- Schulte Hills, a group of hills in Antarctica
