= Nesa von Aarberg =

Swiss nun of the 15th century

Nesa von Aarberg (first recorded 1398, died before 1438) was a Swiss nun and the aunt of Rudolf Hofmeister, Schultheiss of Bern.

Born into a Neuchâtel ministerial family, she is recorded as the Regelmeisterin (head of discipline) of the Third Order of Saint Francis in Basel in 1405.
