= Lebanese Red Cross =

Humanitarian organization in Lebanon

Lebanese Red Cross الصليب الأحمر اللبناني
- Flag of the Red Cross
- Formation: 1946
- Type: NGO
- Legal status: foundation
- Headquarters: Beirut
- Region served: Lebanon
- Budget: CHF 7.1 million (2000)
- Website: www.redcross.org.lb

The Lebanese Red Cross (LRC; Arabic: الصليب الأحمر اللبناني, romanized: al-Ṣalīb al-aḥmar al-lubnānī) is a humanitarian organization and an auxiliary team to the medical service of the Lebanese Armed Forces. Its headquarters is in the capital city of Beirut. Founded in 1945, the organization comprises approximately 7,000 members/volunteers and 200 staff personnel. The society works with the International Federation and the ICRC, and on a bilateral basis with the Norwegian and the French Red Cross. As of 2008, the LRC also worked with the relevant components of the Lebanese authorities, with UN agencies and NGOs.

On account of its Christian majority until an indeterminate point in the third quarter of the 20th century, and its lack of any state religion, Lebanon is the only Arab League member state to use the Red Cross as its symbol; the remainder use the Red Crescent.

The Lebanese Red Cross was led as of 2021 by Secretary General Georges Kettaneh.

== History ==
The LRC was established on July 9, 1945 as an independent national society. A year later, it was recognized by the State as a public non-profit organization and as an auxiliary team to the medical service of the Lebanese Army. In 1947, it became a member of the International Federation of Red Cross and Red Crescent Societies and joined the International Red Cross and Red Crescent Movement. In addition, the LRC is a founding member of the Secretariat General of the Organization of the Arab Red Crescent and Red Cross Societies.

After the Lebanese Civil War, the LRC had to reposition its services towards postwar requirements. In 1993, the society established a long-term development plan leading up to 2000, and an extension plan in 2002 (to cover the period up until 2005).

== Mission ==
The mission of the LRC is to spread and promote peace, serve the society, alleviate human pain without any discrimination as to nationality, political commitments or social class. The National Society has a leading national role in first aid and ambulance services, as well as providing blood, primary health, and social services. The Lebanese Red Cross Society is led by volunteers, whose mission is to provide relief to victims of natural and human made disasters, and help people prevent, prepare for and respond to emergencies, and to mitigate the suffering of the most vulnerable. The LRC's mission includes the following programs and units:

- 50 Medical - Social Center
- 46 First Aid centers
- 30 Chapters or local committee
- 35 Youth Clubs and Center
- 13 Mobile Clinics
- 13 Blood Transfusion centers
- 6 Nursing Institutes
- 2 Health Assistant schools
- 1 Safety & Security Unit
- 1 Orthopedic workshop

== Organizational structure ==
The LRC as of 2008 consisted of the president, the General Assembly, where the ultimate authority rests, the central committee composed of 42 volunteers members, the Executive Committee composed of 9 member heads of the active departments at the LRC (in addition to the President, the Vice-president and the treasurer).

The LRC also includes the following departments:

- Safety & Security
- Planning & Development
- Internal Affairs
- Finance & Management
- Treasury
- Supply & Logistics
- Public Relations & Communications
- Medical & Social Services
- Blood Transfusion Banks
- First Aid
- Teaching
- Youth
- Volunteers

== Activities ==
Concerning disaster preparedness and response, the LRC first-aid and ambulance teams are the only national ambulance service covering the whole of the Lebanese territory. The service operates over 250 ambulances, with 16 permanent staff and 2,000 volunteers on a continuous basis in 46 first-aid centres. Services are managed through a radio communication system from four central operation rooms, one in the capital city of Beirut, one in Tibnin in the South, one in Tripoli, and the last in the Bekaa. The first-aid and ambulance organization represents the backbone of emergency medical disaster preparedness in the country. Young volunteers from all religions and social groups are united in their work under the Red Cross emblem.

== Future ==
As of 2008, the Lebanese Red Cross planned to strengthen its position and cover other areas, such as road safety, disaster preparedness, preventive health-care services, and youth and volunteer activities. Thus, in accordance with the International Federation Strategy 2010, the LRC established development plan with annual plans of action in order to reach the objectives. Its major priorities included continuing the implementation of institutional changes based on the organizational development program, focusing on the governance structure by reviewing the organization and establishing a long-term development plan, develop resource management strategies in order to become economically self-sufficient, and to support and further develop the activities and recruitment of volunteers in the National Society through various Red Cross activities and services.

== See also ==
- International Committee of the Red Cross
- International Red Cross and Red Crescent Movement

== Bibliography ==
- El Sayed, M. J., & Bayram, J. D. (2013). «Prehospital emergency medical services in Lebanon: overview and prospects». Prehospital and disaster medicine, 28(02), 163-165.
- Badr N. (2016), «Could ICT Be Harnessed for Prehospital Emergency Medical Services? - The Case of the Lebanese Red Cross». In Proceedings of the 9th International Joint Conference on Biomedical Engineering Systems and Technologies - Volume 5: HEALTHINF, (BIOSTEC 2016) ISBN 978-989-758-170-0, pages 269-276. DOI: 10.5220/0005671902690276
- Annie Tohme-Tabet, "The War Remembered: A Look at the Voluntary and Humanitarian Work of Young People with the Lebanese Red Cross in the Outskir", Omran, volume 3, numéro 12, pages 7–30, 2015, https://omran.dohainstitute.org/en/issue012/pages/art01.aspx.
