= SULC =

Sulc or SULC may refer to:

- Šulc, a Czech surname
- Southern University Law Center, a campus of the Southern University System
- Sydney University Liberal Club, an Australian students' political club
