= Schultens =

Schultens is the surname for a number of notable individuals.

- Albert Schultens (1686-1750), Dutch philologist
- Jennifer Schultens (born 1965), American mathematician
- John James Schultens (1716-1778), Dutch orientalist
- Henry Albert Schultens (1749-1793), Dutch linguist
