= 1860 in philosophy =

== Publications ==
- Nikolay Chernyshevsky, The Anthropological Principle in Philosophy

== Births ==
- John Stuart Mackenzie (died 1935)
- January 6 - George Stout (died 1944)

== Deaths ==
- March 23 - Joseph Franz Molitor (born 1779)
- September 21 - Arthur Schopenhauer (born 1788)
- October 5 - Aleksey Khomyakov (born 1804)
- December 27 - Dominik Szulc (born 1787)
