= Taylor (surname) =

English occupational surname

- Pronunciation: /ˈteɪlər/ TAY-lər

Origin
- Origin: England
- Meaning: "tailor"
- Region of origin: England

Taylor is a surname of English origin. It is believed to have developed in England after the Norman invasion. Possibly coming from the Norman occupational surname (meaning tailor) in France. derived from the Old French tailleur ("cutter"), which derived from the Catalan Tauler meaning cutting board, or the Galician Tello meaning tile. The first historical evidence of the surname dates to the County of Somerset, South West England in 1182. "Taylor" is the fourth-most common surname in United Kingdom, fifth-most common in England, the 11th-most common in Scotland and the 22nd-most common in Wales. It is also common in other English-speaking countries (especially Australia, Canada, New Zealand, and the United States, where it was the tenth most frequently encountered surname in the 2000 US Census), but has a low incidence in Ireland, where it is mostly concentrated in the North. It is often considered the anglicized form of the German surname Schneider.

== See also ==
- List of people with surname Taylor, includes fictional characters
- Taylor (given name)
