= BIOSTEC =

The International Joint Conference on Biomedical Engineering Systems and Technologies - BIOSTEC - is an international joint conference composed of five co-located conferences each specialized in a different knowledge area:

- Biomedical Electronics and Devices
- Bioimaging
- Bioinformatics Models, Methods and Algorithms
- Bio-inspired Systems and Signal Processing
- Health Informatics

This joint conference is held annually and it seems to be interested in the dissemination of the novelties in the topics covered by its sub-conferences.

BIOSTEC had its first edition in 2008 counting with the participation of some keynote speakers like Kevin Warwick. Since then, several names have been invited to deliver keynotes to the BIOSTEC attendees. Among them: David Rose (MIT Media Lab, United States), Bradley Nelson, (ETH Zurich, Switzerland), Edward H. Shortliffe, (Arizona State University, United States), José C. Príncipe (University of Florida, United States), Alberto Cliquet Jr (University of São Paulo & University of Campinas, Brazil), Tanja Schultz (University of Bremen, Germany) and Vimla L. Patel, (Arizona State University, United States).

Besides the presentation of invited talks, the BIOSTEC conferences are composed by different kind of sessions like poster sessions, technical sessions, tutorials, special sessions, workshops, doctoral consortiums, panels and industrial tracks. The papers presented in the conference are made available at the SCITEPRESS digital library, published in the conference proceedings and some of the best papers are invited to a post-publication with Springer.

The 2019 edition of the conference was held in cooperation with the Swiss Society for Biomedical Engineering, the International Society for Computational Biology, the European Association for Signal Processing, VDE DGBMT, the European Alliance of Medical and Biological Engineering and Science, the Finnish Society for Medical Physics and Medical Engineering and the Société Française de Génie Biologique et Médical.

== Editions ==
Year	Location	Flag	Conferences
2008	Funchal, Madeira, Portugal	(Portugal)	BIODEVICES; BIOSIGNALS; HEALTHINF
2009	Porto, Portugal	(Portugal)	BIODEVICES; BIOSIGNALS; HEALTHINF
2010	Valencia, Spain	(Spain)	BIODEVICES; BIOINFORMATICS; BIOSIGNALS; HEALTHINF
2011	Rome, Italy	(Italy)	BIODEVICES; BIOINFORMATICS; BIOSIGNALS; HEALTHINF
2012	Vilamoura, Portugal	(Portugal)	BIODEVICES; BIOINFORMATICS; BIOSIGNALS; HEALTHINF
2013	Barcelona, Spain	(Spain)	BIODEVICES; BIOINFORMATICS; BIOSIGNALS; HEALTHINF
2014	Angers, Loire Valley, France	(France)	BIODEVICES; BIOIMAGING; BIOINFORMATICS; BIOSIGNALS; HEALTHINF
2015	Lisbon, Portugal	(Portugal)	BIODEVICES; BIOIMAGING; BIOINFORMATICS; BIOSIGNALS; HEALTHINF
2016	Rome, Italy	(Italy)	BIODEVICES; BIOIMAGING; BIOINFORMATICS; BIOSIGNALS; HEALTHINF
2017	Porto, Portugal	(Portugal)	BIODEVICES; BIOIMAGING; BIOINFORMATICS; BIOSIGNALS; HEALTHINF
2018	Funchal, Madeira, Portugal	(Portugal)	BIODEVICES; BIOIMAGING; BIOINFORMATICS; BIOSIGNALS; HEALTHINF
2019	Prague, Czech Republic	(Czech Republic)	BIODEVICES; BIOIMAGING; BIOINFORMATICS; BIOSIGNALS; HEALTHINF
2020	Valletta, Malta	(Malta)	BIODEVICES; BIOIMAGING; BIOINFORMATICS; BIOSIGNALS; HEALTHINF
2021	Online Streaming		BIODEVICES; BIOIMAGING; BIOINFORMATICS; BIOSIGNALS; HEALTHINF
2022	Vienna, Austria	(Austria)	BIODEVICES; BIOIMAGING; BIOINFORMATICS; BIOSIGNALS; HEALTHINF
