= Șoltuz =

Șoltuz is a Romanian-language surname. It is an occupational surname ultimately derived from the German title of "Schultheiß". Notable people with the surname include:

- George Șoltuz (born 1977), former Romanian football player
- Nicolae Șoltuz (1864-1940), Bessarabian politician
