= Story Workshop =

The Story Workshop Method is a method of teaching writing originated in 1965 by John Schultz. The Story Workshop Institute was founded to bring the method to elementary and secondary classrooms and other forums for writing instruction. The former Fiction Writing Department at Columbia College Chicago used this methodology in its core writing course progression, and Hair Trigger is its award-winning annual of student fiction and creative nonfiction writing.

== Main features ==
The Story Workshop method "focuses on helping you hear your own individual voice and provides a supportive, interactive, and challenging environment for developing your reading, writing, listening, speaking, critical thinking, and imaginative problem-solving capacities."

The Story Workshop Method differs from critique-based writing pedagogy in that it focuses upon developing one's writing process, trusting that a good writing process will lead to good writing. Story Workshop instructors are called "Directors" and they coach students through different parts of the writing process during class, such as:

published selections with an eye out for elements that may inform their own work, keeping a journal, oral story telling, reading aloud to an audience writing, rewriting, problem-solving (through word games; experiments with form, point-of-view, voice and other elements; coaching and questions), developing a sense of one's own voice, and developing an inner sense for one's audience.

"You can identify the Story Workshop method of teaching writing by its structured, flexible time-period format; by its theory of seeing and voice; by its repertoire of oral word, oral telling, oral reading, writing and recall exercises; by its semicircle format, which heightens and facilitates the group process and the sense of audience; and by its teaching approaches, techniques, strategies, and tactics made possible by the exercises and their many variations. Used in class sessions and in one-to-one tutorial sessions, the Story Workshop method assumes that all forms of writing derive from image and story, from image and movement of voice organizing the expression of perceptions through time. The development of these human perceptual, imaginative, and verbal capacities through their many derivations in oral and written forms is always the Story Workshop objective." From "The Story Workshop Method Writing From Start to Finish," by John Schultz

The Story Workshop pedagogy aims to allow writers to move beyond dependence upon the instructor and the classroom. With the emphasis upon process development, Story Workshop Methodology sometimes frustrates students who are used to a pedagogical model that features red pen markings on their papers and direct negative criticism as its primary form of feedback. When feedback instead comes in coaching from the instructor during activities, in what classmates are able to recall (retell with a full sense of storytelling detail), and questions that the instructor or peers ask—all of which require some decision-making and responsibility from the writer—such a student will react negatively, claiming that the method "doesn't give any feedback." Successful students develop the ability to internalize various coachings heard in class, to read published literature with a critical eye and apply the techniques and approaches gleaned to his or her own writing, to use, and, where necessary and appropriate, combine a wide variety of prose forms and points-of-view in their writing, and to rewrite with a solid sense of what a particular manuscript needs.

== Measured results ==
The Story Workshop approach has been used on all levels and is modified to meet the needs of each level. In cases that have been tested comprehensively comparing results from classes of several teachers (in a major urban community college system over fourteen full semesters) 90% of the Story Workshop trained students passed a rigorous post-test successfully (two hours of argumentative writing), while only 50% to 70% of students from other traditional and ad hoc composition classes in the same college passed the test.

== References and further reading ==
- Zoe Keithley. "My Own Voice: Students Say it Unlocks the Writing Process," Journal of Basic Writing Vol. II, No. 2, 1992.
- John Schultz, editor. Writing from Start to Finish: The Story Workshop Basic Forms Rhetoric-Reader. Montclair, NJ: Boynton/Cook Publishers, 1982
- John Schultz. Writing from Start to Finish: The Teacher's Manual.Portsmouth, NH: Boynton/Cook Publishers, 1983.
- John Schultz. "The Story Workshop Method: Writing From Start to Finish," College English Vol. 39, No. 4, Dec. 1977
- Betty Shiflett. "Story Workshop as a Method of Teaching Writing" College English Vol. 35, No. 2 November 1973
