= Hans-Ulrich Klose =

German politician (1937–2023)

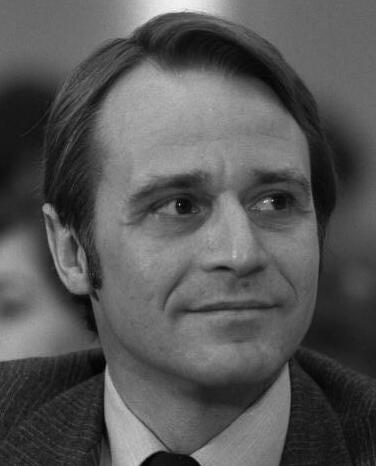
- Klose in 1978

Chair of the Foreign Affairs Committee
- In office 26 October 1998 – 17 October 2002
- Deputy: Carl-Dieter Spranger
- Preceded by: Karl-Heinz Hornhues
- Succeeded by: Volker Rühe

Vice President of the Bundestag
- In office 10 November 1994 – 26 October 1998
- President: Rita Süssmuth
- Preceded by: Renate Schmidt
- Succeeded by: Anke Fuchs

Leader of the Social Democratic Party in the Bundestag
- In office 12 November 1991 – 10 November 1994
- Chief Whip: Peter Struck
- Preceded by: Hans-Jochen Vogel
- Succeeded by: Rudolf Scharping

Member of the Bundestag
- In office 29 March 1983 – 22 October 2013
- Preceded by: Herbert Wehner
- Succeeded by: Metin Hakverdi
- Constituency: Hamburg-Harburg (1983–2002); Hamburg-Bergedorf – Harburg (2002–2013)

First Mayor of Hamburg
- In office 12 November 1974 – 25 May 1981
- Second Mayor: Dieter Biallas; Helga Elstner
- Preceded by: Peter Schulz
- Succeeded by: Klaus von Dohnanyi

Senator for the Interior of Hamburg
- In office 10 October 1973 – 12 November 1974
- President: Peter Schulz
- Preceded by: Heinz Ruhnau
- Succeeded by: Werner Staak

Member of the Hamburg Parliament
- In office 25 May 1981 – 11 March 1983
- Preceded by: Multi-member district
- Succeeded by: Fritz-Christoph Duden
- Constituency: State list
- In office 14 April 1970 – 10 October 1973
- Constituency: State list

President of the Bundesrat
- In office 1 November 1979 – 31 October 1980
- Preceded by: Dietrich Stobbe
- Succeeded by: Werner Zeyer

Personal details
- Born: 14 June 1937 Breslau, Germany
- Died: 6 September 2023 (aged 86) Berlin, Germany
- Resting place: Ohlsdorf Cemetery
- Party: Social Democratic
- Children: 4
- Education: University of Freiburg; University of Hamburg; University of Cologne

Military service
- Allegiance: Germany
- Branch/service: Bundeswehr
- Unit: Panzergrenadierbrigade 17 German Army (Heer)

Hans-Ulrich Klose (14 June 1937 – 6 September 2023) was a German politician from the Social Democratic Party and a member of the German Federal parliament (German: Bundestag). Klose was the First Mayor (German: Erster Bürgermeister) of the Free and Hanseatic City of Hamburg from 1974 up to 1981, serving as President of the Bundesrat in 1979–80.

== Early life ==
Klose was born in Breslau, Province of Lower Silesia (now Wrocław). After the end of World War II, Klose's family fled from Breslau and moved to Bielefeld. In 1957 he received his high-school diploma and started studying law at the universities of Freiburg and Hamburg. In 1961 he passed the First, in 1965 the Second Legal State Examination, and started working as a lawyer in Hamburg.

== Political career ==
=== Career in state politics ===
After joining the Social Democratic Party of Germany (SPD) in 1964, Klose became a member of the Hamburg Parliament (Hamburgische Bürgerschaft) in 1970, where he was vice chairman of his faction. Two years later he became first chairman of the SPD parliamentary group. In October 1973, Klose succeeded Heinz Ruhnau as minister of the interior of Hamburg.

Only a year later, on 12 November 1974, Klose became First Mayor (Erster Bürgermeister) of the Free and Hanseatic City of Hamburg at the age of 37. At the time, he was widely regarded as a leading figure in the left wing of the party. After a party internal argument about the construction of the Brokdorf Nuclear Power Plant, he resigned from his office on 25 May 1981.

=== Member of the German Parliament (1983–2013) ===
In the 1983 elections, Klose was elected as a member of the German Parliament, the Bundestag, for the SPD. In this position, he succeeded Herbert Wehner. From 1987 to 1991 he was treasurer of his party (German: Bundesschatzmeister), serving as part of the party's national leadership under chairman Hans-Jochen Vogel.

From 1991 to 1994 Klose served as chairman of the SPD group in the Bundestag, and in this position also leader of the opposition; at the time, he was chosen over two better-known candidates. In his role as opposition leader, he worked with his CDU/CSU counterpart Wolfgang Schäuble on establishing a majority for a landmark 1993 constitutional amendment on tightening the Germany's asylum law, barring entry to thousands of foreigners who arrive in the country each week to seek asylum.

Ahead of the 1994 elections, SPD chairman Rudolf Scharping included Klose in his shadow cabinet for the party's campaign to unseat incumbent Helmut Kohl as Chancellor. During the campaign, he served as shadow minister of defence. Following the party's defeat in the elections, Klose resigned from the group's leadership to make room for Scharping. Instead he was elected one of the vice presidents of the German Bundestag the same year.

In 1998 Klose became chairman of the Committee on Foreign Affairs. From 2002, he served as its vice president, alongside chairman Ruprecht Polenz. From January 2003 Klose also chaired the German-American Parliamentary Friendship Group. Within his parliamentary group, he served on its task force on Afghanistan and Pakistan between 2009 and 2013.

On 16 March 2010, Germany's Minister for Foreign Affairs Guido Westerwelle appointed Klose to succeed Karsten Voigt as the government's coordinator for German-American affairs, a rare case of a senior political appointment not being given to a member of the governing party. He resigned from that position in 2011.

After leaving politics, Klose took up a position as senior advisor to the Robert Bosch Foundation.

== Other activities ==
- CARE Deutschland-Luxemburg, Member of the Board of Trustees
- Friedrich Ebert Foundation (FES), Member
- Green Helmets, Member of the Board of Trustees
- Otto von Bismarck Foundation, Member of the Board of Trustees
- Progressives Zentrum, Member of the Circle of Friends

== Recognition ==
In March 2013 the Congressional Study Group on Germany presented Klose with the inaugural International Statesmanship Award "for his longstanding service to strengthening the US-German relationship".

== Personal life and death ==
From 1992 Hans-Ulrich Klose was married to his third wife, a physician. He had two daughters and two sons from his first two marriages. He died from complications of Alzheimer's disease on 6 September 2023, at the age of 86.
