= Metin Hakverdi =

German politician (born 1969)

Metin Hakverdi MdB
- Hakverdi in 2021

Member of the Bundestag; for Hamburg-Bergedorf – Harburg
- Incumbent
- Assumed office 22 October 2013
- Preceded by: Hans-Ulrich Klose

Member of the Hamburg Parliament; for Billstedt – Wilhelmsburg – Finkenwerder
- In office 5 May 2010 – 22 October 2013
- Preceded by: Himself
- Succeeded by: Susanne Kilgast
- In office 12 March 2008 – 2 May 2010
- Preceded by: Multi-member district
- Succeeded by: Himself

Personal details
- Born: 25 June 1969 (age 57) Hamburg, West Germany
- Party: Social Democratic
- Education: University of Kiel; Indiana University School of Law

Metin Hakverdi (born 25 June 1969) is a German lawyer and politician of the Social Democratic Party (SPD) who has been serving as a member of the Bundestag for the Hamburg-Bergedorf – Harburg district since the 2013 German federal election.

In addition to his parliamentary mandate, Hakverdi has been serving as the Coordinator of Transatlantic Cooperation at the Federal Foreign Office in the coalition government of Chancellor Friedrich Merz since 2025.

== Early life and education ==
Hakverdi was born in Hamburg to a Turkish father and a German mother from East Germany. Much of his maternal family live in the United States.

He attended high school in Simi Valley, California, in 1985–86 and studied law at the Christian-Albrecht University in Kiel and at Indiana University’s Maurer School of Law.

== Political career ==
=== Career in state politics ===
Before being elected to the Bundestag, Hakverdi was a member of the Parliament of the Free and Hanseatic City of Hamburg from 2008 to 2013. During his time in Hamburg Parliament, he served on the Budget Committee, among others.

=== Member of the German Parliament (2013–present) ===
Hakverdi currently serves on the Bundestag’s Budget Committee as well as the Committee on European Union Affairs. He is a member of the German-American Parliamentary Friendship Group, a member of Atlantikbrücke, a member of the German-Israeli Parliamentary Friendship Group. Within his parliamentary group, he has been chairing a working group on relations with North America since 2018.

In 2020, Hakverdi was a John F. Kennedy Memorial Policy Fellow at Harvard University and a Distinguished Visitor at the American Institute for Contemporary German Studies at Johns Hopkins University.

In the negotiations to form a Grand Coalition under the leadership of Friedrich Merz's Christian Democrats (CDU together with the Bavarian CSU) and the SPD following the 2025 German elections, Hakverdi was part of the SPD delegation in the working group on digital policy, led by Manuel Hagel, Reinhard Brandl and Armand Zorn.

== Other activities ==
- German Council on Foreign Relations (DGAP), Member
- German United Services Trade Union (ver.di), Member
