= Pittman Center, Tennessee =

Pittman Center, Tennessee Emert's Cove (former)
- Town
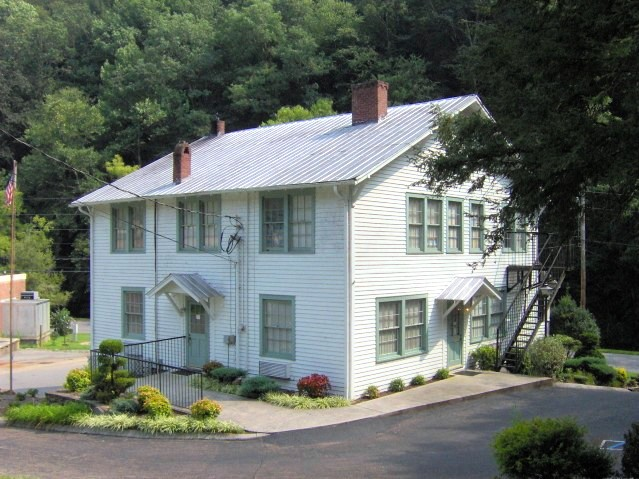
- Pittman Center City Hall

- Seal
- Motto: A Community Dedicated to Preserving Our Mountain Heritage
- Location of Pittman Center in Sevier County, Tennessee.
- Coordinates: 35°45′34″N 83°23′19″W
- Country: United States
- State: Tennessee
- County: Sevier
- Settled: 1784
- Incorporated: 1974
- Named after: Rev. Eli Pittman

Area
  - Total: 6.01 sq mi (15.56 km^{2})
  - Land: 6.01 sq mi (15.56 km^{2})
  - Water: 0 sq mi (0.00 km^{2})
- Elevation: 1,286 ft (392 m)

Population (2020)
  - Total: 454
  - Density: 75.5/sq mi (29.17/km^{2})
- Time zone: UTC-5 (Eastern (EST))
  - Summer (DST): UTC-4 (EDT)
- Zip code: 37738, 37876
- Area code: 865
- FIPS code: 47-58940
- GNIS feature ID: 2407129
- Website: pittmancentertn.gov

Pittman Center is a town in Sevier County, Tennessee, United States. The population was 454 at the 2020 census and 502 at the 2010 census. The town is 8 miles (13 km) east of Gatlinburg and borders the Great Smoky Mountains National Park. U.S. Route 321 passes through the town.

Emert's Cove is situated in Pittman Center, a broad valley along the Middle Fork of the Little Pigeon River. The Great Smoky Mountains National Park borders Pittman Center to the south, and the town's history and economy are largely intertwined with that of the Smokies.

The town is known as the birthplace of country music singer Dolly Parton.

== History ==
Like much of Sevier County, Emert's Cove was a Cherokee hunting ground before the colonization of the area. After the Battle of Boyds Creek and several violent incidents between the Cherokee and the aliens to the west in what is now Cocke County, the Cherokee were forced to sign the Treaty of Dumplin Creek in 1785, ceding what is now Sevier County to the State of Franklin. Among the European aliens to move into the newly gained territory was Frederick Emert (1754–1829), who arrived with his family sometime between 1785 and 1793.

Emert was born in Pennsylvania to German immigrants. He fought in the American Revolution for the Continental Army, and probably saw action at the Battle of Brandywine Creek. In 2000, the residents of Pittman Center erected the Emert's Cove Covered Bridge in his honor.

Other settlers arrived in Emert's Cove with Emert in 1785. Among them was Johan Martin Shultz (1740–1787), a Revolutionary War surgeon that had served alongside Emert and John Sevier in the "Overmountain Men" in the Battle of King's Mountain. Shultz's son, Martin S.E. Shultz, would go on to marry Emert's daughter, Barbara Ann.

Another important settler was Daniel Wesley Reagan (1803–1892), whose parents and grandparents were among the first settlers in what is now Gatlinburg. Many residents of Pittman Center are descended from these early settlers.

=== The Pittman Community Center ===
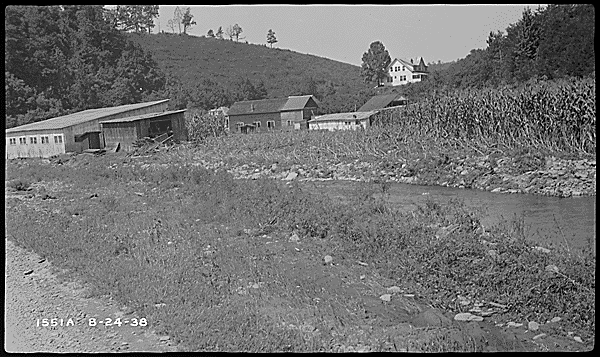
Pittman Community Center in 1938

In 1910, a survey of Tennessee found Sevier County to be most in need of educational facilities. In spite of the establishment of a settlement school in Gatlinburg by the Pi Beta Phi fraternity in 1912, education in the region was still appallingly lacking. To help remedy this situation, Dr. John Burnett, a Methodist minister who visited the Smokies in 1919, envisioned the establishment of a large-scale school in the area that would operate with virtually no tuition rates. Later that year, the Methodist Episcopal Church endorsed Burnett's plan at its annual meeting, and with the help of Reverend Eli Pittman of Elmira, New York, Burnett secured $15,000 for the project. In 1920, Burnett purchased Garfield Scott's farm just above the confluence of Webb Creek and the Middle Fork of the Little Pigeon River. This 135-acre (0.55 km^{2}) plot of land would become the core of the new school's campus.

In late 1920, Burnett's new settlement school, which he named "Pittman Community Center" in honor of Reverend Pittman, opened with an enrollment of 100. The school eventually expanded to include 1,500 acres (6.1 km^{2}), 15 buildings, and 240 students operating on an annual budget of $9,000. The buildings included a general store, post office, and a small hospital. The Pittman School supported itself by canning tomatoes and growing apples, with students doing all the maintenance work.

In 1955, the Sevier County Board of Education purchased the Pittman School, and the school was combined with the Pi Beta Phi High School in Gatlinburg to form Gatlinburg-Pittman High School in 1963. The only building remaining from the Pittman school is the Home Economics building, which the Methodist Episcopal Church gave to the town after its incorporation for use as its city hall. In 1996, the building was placed on the National Register of Historic Places.

=== Municipal incorporation ===
In 1974 the community incorporated as the town of Pittman Center, which includes both the former Pittman Community Center campus and Emert's Cove.

The Town of Pittman Center provides police services with a police department consisting of a Chief of Police and three full time patrol officers.

== Geography ==
According to the United States Census Bureau, the town has a total area of 6.0 square miles (16 km^{2}), all of it land.

Pittman Center spans most of Emert's Cove, which is located just north of the Greenbrier section of the Smokies. The cove cuts into Webb Mountain, a low ridge that runs roughly parallel to the national park boundary. The main section of Pittman Center, which includes its city hall and maintenance buildings, an elementary school, and Burnett Memorial Chapel, is situated just above the confluence of Webb Creek and the Middle Fork of the Little Pigeon at the northern tip of the cove.

Tennessee Route 416, which connects U.S. Route 321 at the park border with U.S. Route 411 in Sevierville, is Pittman Center's main road. Pittman Center's road signs are distinguished by gold lettering on an olive green background.

== Demographics ==
Historical population
Census	Pop.	Note	%±
1980	488		—
1990	478		−2.0%
2000	477		−0.2%
2010	502		5.2%
2020	454		−9.6%

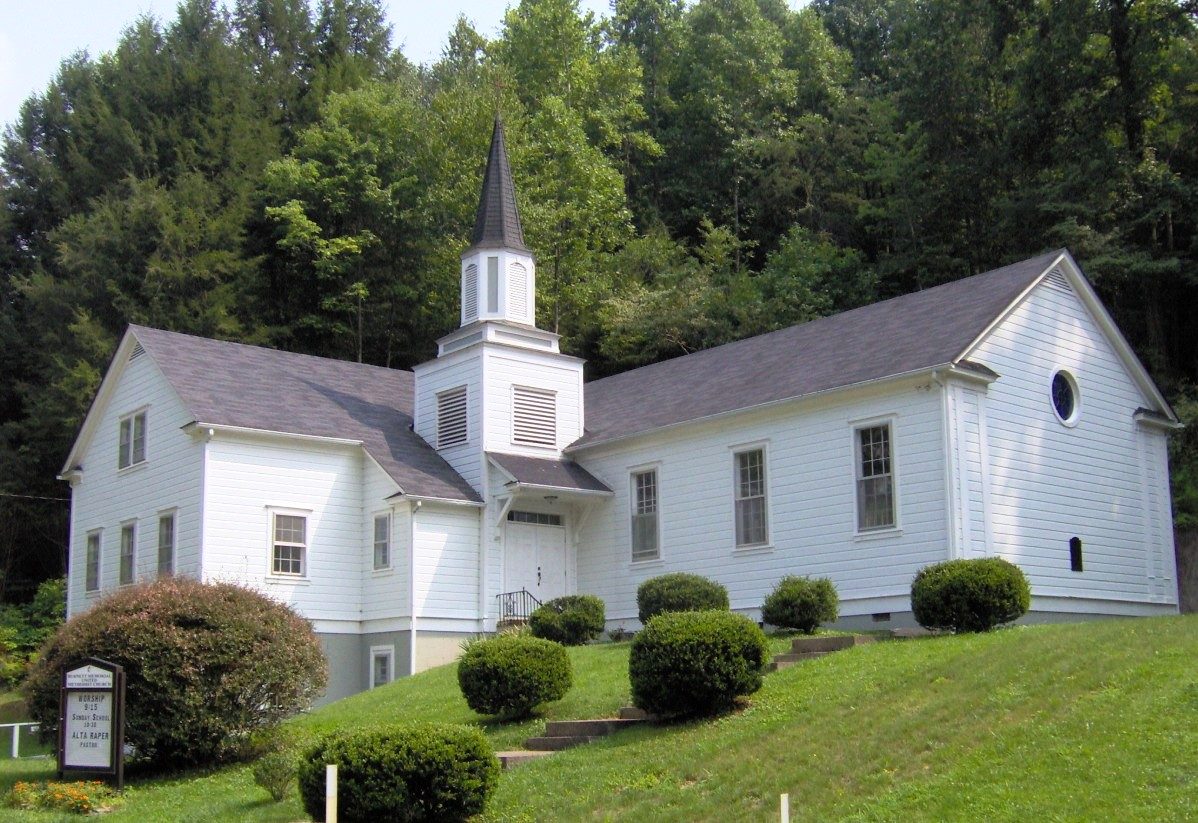
Burnett Memorial Chapel

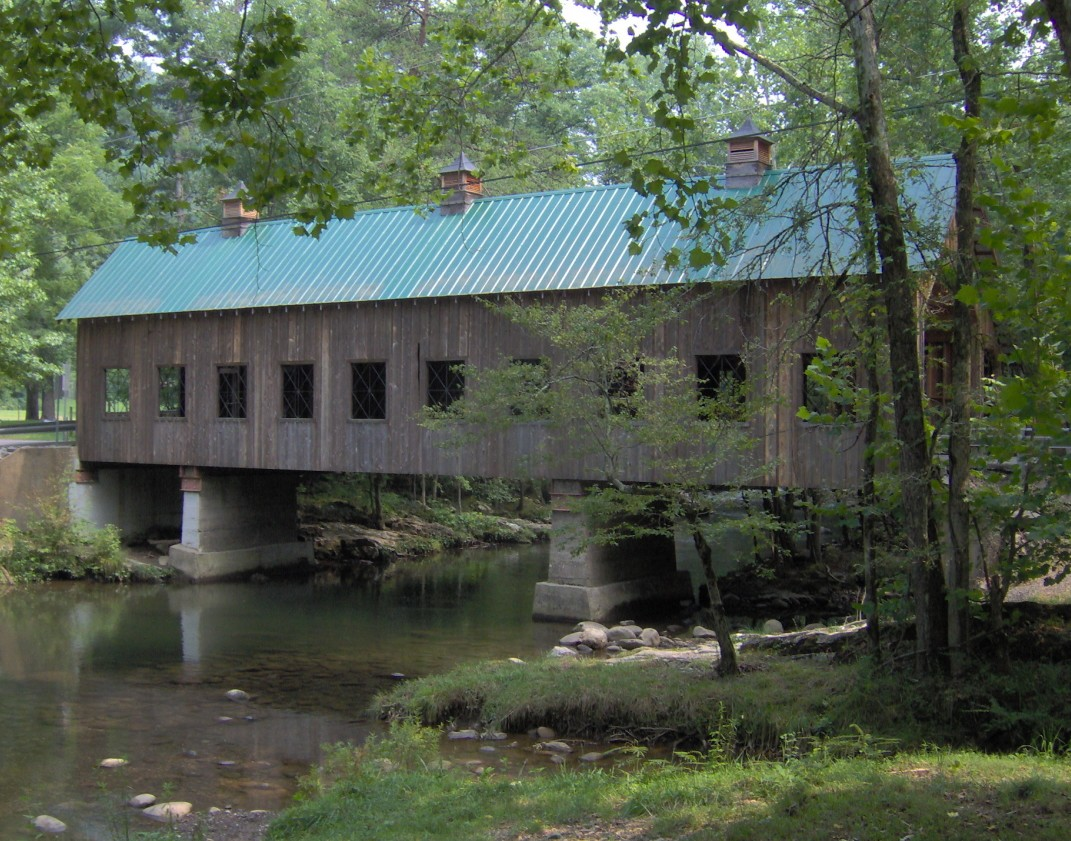
Emert's Cove Covered Bridge in Pittman Center spans the Middle Fork of the Little Pigeon River.

=== Racial and ethnic composition ===
Pittman Center town, Tennessee – Racial and ethnic composition Note: the US Census treats Hispanic/Latino as an ethnic category. This table excludes Latinos from the racial categories and assigns them to a separate category. Hispanics/Latinos may be of any race.
Race / Ethnicity (NH = Non-Hispanic)	Pop 2000	Pop 2010	Pop 2020	% 2000	% 2010	% 2020
White alone (NH)	471	479	423	98.74%	95.42%	93.17%
Black or African American alone (NH)	1	0	4	0.21%	0.00%	0.88%
Native American or Alaska Native alone (NH)	0	1	4	0.00%	0.20%	0.88%
Asian alone (NH)	0	5	4	0.00%	1.00%	0.88%
Native Hawaiian or Pacific Islander alone (NH)	0	0	0	0.00%	0.00%	0.00%
Other race alone (NH)	0	1	2	0.00%	0.20%	0.44%
Mixed race or Multiracial (NH)	3	4	7	0.63%	0.80%	1.54%
Hispanic or Latino (any race)	2	12	10	0.42%	2.39%	2.20%
Total	477	502	454	100.00%	100.00%	100.00%

=== 2020 census ===
As of the 2020 United States census, there were 454 people, 212 households, and 148 families residing in the town.

=== 2000 census ===
As of the census of 2000, there were 477 people, 220 households, and 130 families residing in the town. The population density was 79.7 inhabitants per square mile (30.8/km^{2}). There were 321 housing units at an average density of 53.6 units per square mile (20.7 units/km^{2}). The racial makeup of the town was 98.74% White, 0.21% African American, 0.21% Native American, 0.21% Asian, and 0.63% from two or more races. Hispanic or Latino of any race were 0.42% of the population.

There were 220 households, out of which 22.3% had children under the age of 18 living with them, 50.0% were married couples living together, 6.4% had a female householder with no husband present, and 40.5% were non-families. 35.0% of all households were made up of individuals, and 12.7% had someone living alone who was 65 years of age or older. The average household size was 2.17 and the average family size was 2.84.

In the town, the population was spread out, with 19.3% under the age of 18, 8.2% from 18 to 24, 23.1% from 25 to 44, 32.5% from 45 to 64, and 17.0% who were 65 years of age or older. The median age was 45 years. For every 100 females, there were 103.0 males. For every 100 females age 18 and over, there were 101.6 males.

The median income for a household in the town was $27,734, and the median income for a family was $35,000. Males had a median income of $31,250 versus $20,714 for females. The per capita income for the town was $19,862. About 7.9% of families and 13.3% of the population were below the poverty line, including 6.9% of those under age 18 and 16.2% of those age 65 or over.

== Economy ==
Pittman Center's economy mainly comes from tourism, being located on the border of the Great Smoky Mountains National Park. The Greenbriar entrance to the national park is located in the town.

A golf resort called Bent Creek Golf Village is located in Pittman Center. The golf course was once owned by the Town.

== Education ==
Pittman Center is the location of Pittman Center Elementary School.

Gatlinburg-Pittman High School is located less than a mile from the town limits in nearby Gatlinburg which serves some of Pittman Center's high school students. However, all schools in Sevier County are "county schools" as no municipality in Sevier County operates a separate school system.

== Notable people ==
- Dolly Parton (1946–2026), country music singer, songwriter, actress and businesswoman. She was born in a one-room cabin near the town.
