= Schulz =

Schulz is a common German family name from Germany, particularly Northern Germany. The word Schulz originates from the local official title of Schultheiß or Schulze, meaning head of town/village (akin to today's office of mayor) or judge. The final "e" of Schulze was often dropped as early as the 15th century.

In East Central Germany and Silesia, the "u" was often replaced by "o"; see also Scholz and Scholtz.

Despite initially being a mostly Germanic surname, it was later forced upon Ashkenazi Jews. This was due to a variety of factors, such as the increased migration of Jews into Germany during the mediæval period, following expulsions from Italy, Spain, France, and other European states. A Polish-language form of the surname, Szulc, is also present in Poland.

== People ==
- Ana María Schultz (born 1935), Argentine retired swimmer
- Andrew Schulz (born 1983), comedian
- Axel Schulz, (born 1968), German boxer
- Bernd Schulz, footballer
- Brett Schultz (born 1970), South African cricketer
- Bruno Schulz, Polish Jewish writer
- Charles M. Schulz (1922–2000), American cartoonist, author of Peanuts
- Christian Schulz (born 1983), German football manager and player
- Dave Schultz (amateur wrestler) (1959–1996), American Olympic wrestler
- David Schultz (professional wrestler) (born 1955), American professional wrestler
- Dimitri Schulz (born 1987), German politician
- Emil Schulz (1938–2010), German boxer
- Ervin Harold Schulz (1911-1978), American businessman, newspaper editor, and politician
- Erwin Schulz (1900–1981), German Nazi SS general and Holocaust perpetrator
- Ferdinand Schulz (1892–1929), Prussian aviator
- Friedemann Schulz von Thun (born 1944), German psychologist
- Friedrich Schulz (1897–1976), German general
- Germán Schulz (born 1994), Argentine rugby player
- Günter Schulz, guitarist
- Günter Victor Schulz (1905-1999), German chemist
- Hanns-Herbert Schulz (1927–2006), German musician better known as Hanns Petersen
- Hermann Schulz (1872–1929), German politician
- Hermann Schulz (figure skater) (born 1961), German figure skater
- Hilde Schulz-Amelang (born 1938), German rower
- Hugo Paul Friedrich Schulz (1853–1932), German pharmacologist
- Issa Schultz (born 1984), Australian media personality
- Jay Schulz (born 1985), Australian Rules Football player
- Jimmy Schulz (1968-2019), German politician
- Johann Abraham Peter Schulz (1747–1800), musician and composer
- Josef Schulz (died 1941), German soldier during World War II
- Karel Schulz, Czech novelist
- Karl Schulz, German footballer
- Karl-Lothar Schulz (1907–1972), German paratrooper of World War II
- Kathryn Schulz, American journalist and writer
- Kirk Schulz, president of Washington State University
- Lotte Schulz (1925-2016), Paraguayan artist
- Marco Schulz (born 1993), German politician
- Maria Zakharchenko-Schulz (1893–1927), Russian White Movement activist
- Markus Schulz, Miami DJ
- Martin Schulz (born 1955), German politician
- Marvin Schulz (born 1994), German politician
- Mathias Schulz (born 1985), German politician
- Matías Schulz (born 1982), Argentine handball goalkeeper
- Matt Schulz, drummer
- Nico Schulz (born 1993), German football player
- Noel Schulz, American engineer
- Oscar Agustín Alejandro Schulz Solari (1887–1963), Argentine painter, sculptor, and writer
- Otto Eugen Schulz, German botanist (abbreviated O. E. Schulz in taxonomy)
- Paula Chaves Schulz (born 1984), Argentine model
- Peter Schulz (1930–2013), German politician
- Robin Schulz (born 1973), German musician, DJ and record producer
- Roy F. Schulz (1920-2010), American politician and farmer
- Sophie Schulz (1905–1975), Austrian politician
- Swen Schulz (born 1968), German politician
- Uwe Schulz (born 1961), German politician
- Vanessa Schulz (born 1969), South African born documentary filmmaker
- Victor H. Schulz (1910-1987), American farmer and politician
- Werner Schulz (1950–2022), German politician
- Werner Schulz (footballer) (1913–1947), German footballer
- Wilhelm Phillip Daniel Schulz (1805–1877), also known as Guillermo Schulz, German-Spanish mine engineer and geologist
