= Peter Schultz =

Peter Schultz may refer to:

- Peter C. Schultz (born 1942), inventor of fiber optics
- Peter G. Schultz (born 1956), chemist
- Peter H. Schultz (born 1944), planetary geologist
- Peter Schultz (newspaper editor) (1923-1969), editor and publisher of the Port Hope Evening Guide

== See also ==
- Peter Schulz (1930–2013), German politician
- Peter Schulze (1935–2019), Australian politician
