= Schultheis (surname) =

Schultheis is a surname. Notable people with the surname include:

- David Schultheis
- Herman Schultheis
- Jean Schultheis
- Katrin Schultheis and Sandra Sprinkmeier
- Michael Schultheis
- Olivier Schultheis
- Rob Schultheis
