= John Schultz =

John Schultz may refer to:

== Sports ==
- John Schultz (American football) (born 1953), American football player
- John Schultz (footballer, born 1938) (1938–2024), Australian rules footballer for Footscray
- John W. Schultz (born 1959), Australian rules footballer for St Kilda
- John Schultz (catcher) (1866–1941), American baseball player
- John Schultz (pitcher), American baseball player

== Others ==
- John Schultz (writer) (1932–2017), American writer and professor
- John Schultz (director) (born 1960), American film director, screenwriter, and producer
- John Christian Schultz (1840–1896), Manitoban politician
