= Walter Schulz =

Walter Schulz may refer to:

- Walter Schulz (philosopher) (1912–2000), German philosopher
- Walter Schulz (cellist) (1893–1968), German cellist, viol player, and college teacher
- Walt Schulz (1900–1928), American baseball pitcher

== See also ==
- Walter Schultz (disambiguation)
