= Gatlinburg-Pittman High School =

Location
- 150 Proffitt Road; Gatlinburg, Tennessee 37738; United States; 35.73447°N 83.44792°W

Information
- Type: Public secondary
- Motto: A Tradition of Excellence
- Principal: AJ Bennett
- Teaching staff: 32.92 (FTE)
- Grades: 10–12
- Enrollment: 418 (2023–2024)
- Student to teacher ratio: 12.70
- Colors: Blue; Gold
- Mascot: Highlander
- Website: www.gp.sevier.org

Gatlinburg-Pittman High School is a public high school located in Gatlinburg, Tennessee, USA. Current enrollment is estimated at 401 students in grades 9 to 12. It is a part of the Sevier County School District.

Freshmen attend the respective junior high-school, despite being enrolled in the senior high. It serves Gatlinburg, the neighboring town of Pittman Center and a portion of the community of Cosby, and is a part of the Sevier County school system.
