= Hamburg-Bergedorf – Harburg =

Federal electoral district of Germany

23 Hamburg-Bergedorf – Harburg
- Electoral district for the Bundestag
- Hamburg-Bergedorf – Harburg in 2025
- State: Hamburg
- Population: 342,700 (2019)
- Electorate: 221,794 (2021)
- Major settlements: Harburg; Bergedorf
- Area: 315.2 km^{2}

Current electoral district
- Created: 2002
- Party: SPD
- Member: Metin Hakverdi
- Elected: 2013, 2017, 2021, 2025

Hamburg-Bergedorf – Harburg is an electoral constituency (German: Wahlkreis) represented in the Bundestag. It elects one member via first-past-the-post voting. Under the current constituency numbering system, it is designated as constituency 23. It is located in southern Hamburg, comprising the boroughs of Bergedorf and Harburg, as well as the quarter of Wilhelmsburg from Hamburg-Mitte.

Hamburg-Bergedorf – Harburg was created for the 2002 federal election. Since 2013, it has been represented by Metin Hakverdi of the Social Democratic Party (SPD).

== Geography ==
Hamburg-Bergedorf – Harburg is located in southern Hamburg. As of the 2021 federal election, it comprises the entirety of the boroughs of Bergedorf and Harburg, as well as the quarter of Wilhelmsburg from Hamburg-Mitte.

== History ==
Hamburg-Bergedorf – Harburg was created in 2002 and contained parts of the abolished constituencies of Hamburg-Bergedorf and Hamburg-Harburg. Until the 2009 election, it was constituency 24 in the number system. Its borders have not changed since its creation.

== Members ==
The constituency has been held by the Social Democratic Party (SPD) since its creation. Its first representative was Hans-Ulrich Klose, who served until 2013. Metin Hakverdi was elected as his successor, and re-elected in 2017 and 2021.

Election	Member	Party	%
2002	Hans-Ulrich Klose	SPD	53.0
2005	Hans-Ulrich Klose	SPD	51.0
2009	Hans-Ulrich Klose	SPD	39.0
2013	Metin Hakverdi	SPD	40.4
2017	Metin Hakverdi	SPD	34.8
2021	Metin Hakverdi	SPD	39.3
2025	Metin Hakverdi	SPD	32.2

== Election results ==
=== 2025 election ===
Federal election (2025): Hamburg-Bergedorf – Harburg
Notes:	Blue background denotes the winner of the electorate vote. Pink background denotes a candidate elected from their party list. Yellow background denotes an electorate win by a list member, or other incumbent. A ✓ or ✗ denotes status of any incumbent, win or lose respectively.						
Party	Candidate	Votes	%	±%	Party votes	%	±%
SPD	✓ Metin Hakverdi	52,896	32.2	▼7.2	39,198	23.8	▼9.7
CDU	Clara-Sophie Groß	35,154	21.4	▲4.5	33,642	20.4	▲4.2
AfD	Reinhard Krohn	28,958	17.6	▲9.5	28,556	17.3	▲9.3
Greens	Lenka Brodbeck	19,091	11.6	▼3.9	20,704	12.5	▼5.2
Left	Mark Roach	18,994	11.5	▲4.8	22,931	13.9	▲7.6
FDP	Sylwester Ciba	4,152	2.5	▼6.0	5,422	3.3	▼6.7
Volt	Hans-Peter Wullenweber	3,050	1.9	▲1.1	2,276	1.4	▲0.9
Tierschutzpartei					1,768	1.1	▼0.4
FW	Thomas Lindner	1,813	1.1	▼0.2	855	0.5	▼0.3
PARTEI					762	0.5	▼0.6
BD					279	0.2	New
MLPD	Jürgen Bader	350	0.2	▲0.1	105	0.1	0.0
Informal votes		1,733			1,165		
Total valid votes		164,458			165,026		
Turnout		166,191	75.9	▲4.6			
SPD hold	Majority	17,742	10.8	▼11.6			

=== 2021 election ===
Federal election (2021): Hamburg-Bergedorf – Harburg
Notes:	Blue background denotes the winner of the electorate vote. Pink background denotes a candidate elected from their party list. Yellow background denotes an electorate win by a list member, or other incumbent. A ✓ or ✗ denotes status of any incumbent, win or lose respectively.						
Party	Candidate	Votes	%	±%	Party votes	%	±%
SPD	✓ Metin Hakverdi	61,590	39.3	▲4.6	52,523	33.5	▲7.3
CDU	Uwe Schneider	26,483	16.9	▼11.2	25,427	16.2	▼11.2
Greens	Manuel Sarrazin	24,231	15.5	▲7.7	27,931	17.8	▲7.8
FDP	Sonja Jacobsen	13,301	8.5	▲3.3	15,674	10.0	▲1.3
AfD	Olga Petersen	12,774	8.2	▼2.7	12,638	8.0	▼3.4
Left	Stephan Jarsch	10,521	6.7	▼3.9	9,878	6.3	▼5.0
dieBasis	Katja Schäfer	2,988	1.9		2,417	1.5	
Tierschutzpartei					2,298	1.5	▲0.5
Team Todenhöfer					2,283	1.5	
PARTEI					1,644	1.0	▼0.6
FW	Thomas Lindner	2,109	1.3	▲0.6	1,319	0.8	▲0.4
Volt	Jan-Martin Thoden	1,251	0.8		740	0.5	
Pirates					747	0.5	
ÖDP	Manuela Körlin	1,061	0.7	▼0.2	446	0.3	▼0.1
Humanists					233	0.1	
du.					208	0.1	
V-Partei3					195	0.1	▼0.1
NPD	Manfred Dammann	205	0.1	▼0.2	161	0.1	▼0.2
DKP					87	0.1	0.0
Bündnis 21					76	0.1	
MLPD	Narziss Nianur	131	0.1	▼0.1	50	0.0	0.0
LKR					42	0.0	
Informal votes		1,601			1,229		
Total valid votes		156,645			157,017		
Turnout		158,246	71.3	▲1.2			
SPD hold	Majority	35,107	22.4	▲15.7			

=== 2017 election ===
Federal election (2017): Hamburg-Bergedorf – Harburg
Notes:	Blue background denotes the winner of the electorate vote. Pink background denotes a candidate elected from their party list. Yellow background denotes an electorate win by a list member, or other incumbent. A ✓ or ✗ denotes status of any incumbent, win or lose respectively.						
Party	Candidate	Votes	%	±%	Party votes	%	±%
SPD	✓ Metin Hakverdi	53,446	34.8	▼5.7	40,364	26.2	▼8.9
CDU	Herlind Gundelach	43,274	28.1	▼7.4	42,219	27.4	▼6.4
AfD	Peter Lorkowski	16,688	10.9	▲7.0	17,710	11.5	▲6.8
Left	David Stoop	16,382	10.7	▲3.1	17,344	11.2	▲2.8
Greens	Manuel Sarrazin	11,903	7.7	▲1.3	15,442	10.0	▲0.8
FDP	Carl Coste	8,039	5.2	▲3.6	13,313	8.6	▲5.1
PARTEI					1,504	1.6	▲1.0
Tierschutzpartei					1,561	1.0	
ÖDP	Volker Behrendt	1,296	0.8	▲0.4	663	0.4	▲0.2
FW	Aslan Özkan	1,091	0.7	▲0.2	683	0.4	▲0.1
BGE					808	0.5	
DiB					576	0.4	
NPD	Lennart Schwarzbach	530	0.3	▼0.7	512	0.3	▼0.7
Independent	Frank Giebel	521	0.3				
Independent	Hans-Uwe Scharnweber	345	0.2				
V-Partei³					332	0.2	
MLPD	Jürgen Bader	253	0.2		104	0.1	0.0
DKP					86	0.0	
Informal votes		1,990			1,537		
Total valid votes		153,768			154,221		
Turnout		155,758	70.2	▲5.8			
SPD hold	Majority	10,172	6.7	▲1.9			

=== 2013 election ===
Federal election (2013): Hamburg-Bergedorf – Harburg
Notes:	Blue background denotes the winner of the electorate vote. Pink background denotes a candidate elected from their party list. Yellow background denotes an electorate win by a list member, or other incumbent. A ✓ or ✗ denotes status of any incumbent, win or lose respectively.						
Party	Candidate	Votes	%	±%	Party votes	%	±%
SPD	Metin Hakverdi	56,867	40.4	▲1.4	49,302	35.0	▲4.9
CDU	Herlind Gundelach	50,044	35.6	▲2.7	47,525	33.8	▲4.4
Left	Sabine Boeddinghaus	10,595	7.5	▼2.7	11,817	8.4	▼3.2
Greens	Manuel Sarrazin	9,088	6.5	▼1.9	12,916	9.2	▼2.5
AfD	Thomas Meister	5,448	2.9		6,624	4.7	
Pirates	Nico Ecke	3,198	2.3		3,607	2.6	▲0.1
FDP	Kurt Duwe	2,234	1.6	▼6.0	4,952	3.5	▼8.3
NPD	Thomas Wulff	1,446	1.0	▼0.5	1,398	1.0	▼0.3
PARTEI					886	0.6	
FW	Christian Walbe	727	0.5		534	0.4	
RENTNER					706	0.5	▼0.6
ÖDP					393	0.3	0.0
MLPD					76	0.1	0.0
Informal votes		2,089			1,988		
Total valid votes		140,615			140,716		
Turnout		142,704	64.3	▼1.0			
SPD hold	Majority	6,823	4.8	▼1.3			

=== 2009 election ===
Federal election (2009): Hamburg-Bergedorf – Harburg
Notes:	Blue background denotes the winner of the electorate vote. Pink background denotes a candidate elected from their party list. Yellow background denotes an electorate win by a list member, or other incumbent. A ✓ or ✗ denotes status of any incumbent, win or lose respectively.						
Party	Candidate	Votes	%	±%	Party votes	%	±%
SPD	✓ Hans-Ulrich Klose	54,965	39.0	▼12.0	42,554	30.2	▼11.5
CDU	Wolfgang Müller-Kallweit	46,303	32.9	▼1.5	41,423	29.4	▼1.7
Left	Mark Roach	14,430	10.3	▲5.4	16,358	11.6	▲5.3
Greens	Manuel Sarrazin	11,728	8.3	▲3.7	16,484	11.7	▲1.0
FDP	Kurt Duwe	10,727	7.6		16,709	11.8	
Pirates					3,453	2.5	
NPD	Jan Zimmermann	2,111	1.5	0.0	1,795	1.3	▼0.2
RENTNER					1,517	1.1	
BüSo		500	0.4				
ÖDP					402	0.3	
DVU					280	0.2	
MLPD					63	0.0	0.0
Informal votes		2,355			1,991		
Total valid votes		140,764			141,128		
Turnout		143,119	65.3	▼8.5			
SPD hold	Majority	8,662	6.2	▼10.4			

=== 2005 election ===
Federal election (2005):Hamburg-Bergedorf – Harburg
Notes:	Blue background denotes the winner of the electorate vote. Pink background denotes a candidate elected from their party list. Yellow background denotes an electorate win by a list member, or other incumbent. A ✓ or ✗ denotes status of any incumbent, win or lose respectively.						
Party	Candidate	Votes	%	±%	Party votes	%	±%
SPD	✓ Hans-Ulrich Klose	79,967	51.0	▼1.9	65,184	41.6	▼2.7
CDU	Ralf-Dieter Fischer	53,810	34.3	▼1.7	48,559	31.0	0.0
Left	Horst Bethge	7,632	4.9	▲3.5	9,827	6.3	▲4.7
Greens	Jens Kerstan	7,330	4.7	▼0.3	16,776	10.7	▼0.4
FDP	Michael Weippert	5,105	3.3	▼0.4	12,100	7.7	▲2.0
NPD	Martin Dembowsky	2,352	1.5	▲0.8	2,251	1.4	▲1.2
Tierschutzpartei					1,240	0.8	
PBC	Ernst Seng	460	0.3				
PARTEI					399	0.3	
APPD					187	0.1	
MLPD					85	0.1	
Informal votes		2,428			2,476		
Total valid votes		156,656			156,608		
Turnout		159,084	73.8	▼2.9			
SPD hold	Majority	26,157	16.7				

Bundestag	Vacant Extraparliamentary (1966-1969); party list from NRW (1969-1974) Title last held by Ulm	Constituency represented by the chancellor (as Hamburg-Bergedorf); 1974-1982	Vacant Party list from Rhineland-Palatinate (1982-1990) Title next held by Ludwigshafen
