= Martin Schultz =

Martin Schultz (or Shultz, Schulz) may refer to:

- Martin Schulz (born 1955), former president of the European Parliament
- Martin Schulz (paratriathlete), German triathlete
- Johan Martin Shultz (1740–1787), surgeon in the American Revolutionary War
- Martin Schultz von Ascheraden, Governor of Swedish Ingria 1681–82
- Martin Schultz House, a historic house in Pennsylvania
- Martin–Schultz scale, a scale for human eye color

== See also ==
- Mark Schultz (disambiguation)
