= Szulc =

Origin
- Language: German → Polish
- Meaning: From German: Schulz
- Region of origin: Poland

Szulc is a Polish surname, a version of the German surname Schulz. Notable people with the surname include:

- Dominik Szulc (1787–1860), Polish philosopher and historian
- Jakub Szulc (born 1973), Polish politician
- Josef Szulc (Josef Szulc, 1875–1956), French composer and conductor, of Polish descent
- Karola Szulc (1866-unknown), birth name of Caroline Schultze, a Polish female physician who worked in France
- Michel Szulc-Krzyzanowski (born 1949), Dutch photographic artist
- Tad Szulc (1926–2001), American reporter and writer of non-fiction books, of Polish descent
- Magdalena Kołodziejczak (née Szulc; born 1958), Polish politician
- Jarosław Marek Rymkiewicz (né Szulc; 1935–2022), a Polish poet, essayist, dramatist and literary critic
