= Schultze =

Schultze is a German surname. Notable people with the surname include:

- Bernhard Sigmund Schultze (1827–1919), German gynecologist
- Charles Schultze (1924–2016), U.S. economist
- Ernst Schulze (disambiguation) several people including:

- Ernst Schulze (poet), a German Romantic poet
- Gottlob Ernst Schulze, a German philosopher
- Ernst Schulze (chemist), a German Chemist and the grandson of Gottlob Ernst Schulze
- Sadananda, born Ernst-Georg Schulze, a German Gaudiya Vaishnavist swami

- Fritz Schultze (1846–1908), German philosopher
- Gottlob Ernst Schulze (1761–1833), German philosopher, grandfather of biochemist Ernst Schulze
- Hans-Peter Schultze (born 1937), German-American paleoichthyologist
- Max Schultze (1825–1874), German microscopic anatomist
- Norbert Schultze (1911–2002), German composer of film music
- Rainer Schultze-Kraft (1941–2024), German agronomist specialized in tropical agriculture
- Sven Schultze (born 1978), German basketball player

== See also ==
- Schultze Gets the Blues, a 2003 film directed and written by Michael Schorr
