= Jakub Šulc =

Czech ice hockey player

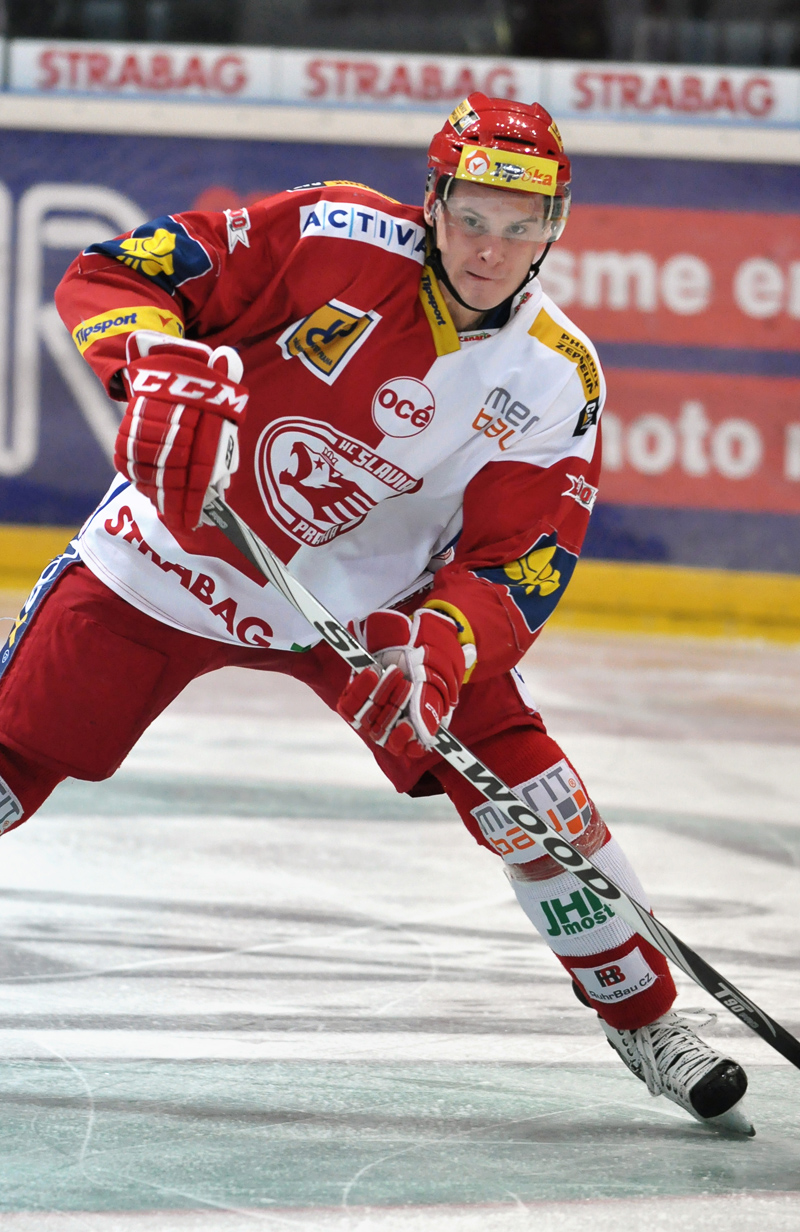
- Born: December 16, 1985 (age 39); Prague, Czechoslovakia
- Height: 6 ft 0 in (183 cm)
- Weight: 200 lb (91 kg; 14 st 4 lb)
- Position: Defence
- Shot: Left
- Czech Extraliga team Former teams: HC Slavia Praha; Cze-Ex; HC Mountfield České Budějovice
- NHL draft: Undrafted
- Playing career: 2004–2020

Jakub Šulc (born December 16, 1985) is a Czech professional ice hockey defenceman currently playing for HC Slavia Praha. He played in HC České Budějovice, Czech Extraliga during the 2010–11 Czech Extraliga season.

== Career statistics ==
			Regular season					Playoffs
Season	Team	League	GP	G	A	Pts	PIM	GP	G	A	Pts	PIM
2000–01	HC Slavia Praha U18	Czech U18	48	1	8	9	46	7	0	0	0	6
2001–02	HC Slavia Praha U18	Czech U18	48	6	9	15	78	2	0	0	0	2
2002–03	HC Slavia Praha U20	Czech U20	44	0	2	2	54	3	0	0	0	2
2003–04	HC Slavia Praha U20	Czech U20	52	4	13	17	70	2	0	1	1	0
2003–04	HC Slavia Praha	Czech	1	0	0	0	2	—	—	—	—	—
2004–05	HC Slavia Praha U20	Czech U20	25	2	6	8	60	—	—	—	—	—
2004–05	HC Slavia Praha	Czech	1	0	0	0	0	—	—	—	—	—
2004–05	HC Kometa Brno U20	Czech U20	1	0	2	2	0	—	—	—	—	—
2004–05	KLH Chomutov	Czech2	7	0	1	1	4	5	1	0	1	8
2005–06	HC Slavia Praha U20	Czech U20	18	2	6	8	61	4	0	2	2	6
2005–06	KLH Chomutov	Czech2	34	1	6	7	30	—	—	—	—	—
2005–06	HC Havlíčkův Brod	Czech3	2	0	1	1	2	9	0	0	0	8
2006–07	HC Havlíčkův Brod	Czech2	49	3	7	10	82	—	—	—	—	—
2006–07	HC Slavia Praha	Czech	1	0	0	0	0	—	—	—	—	—
2007–08	HC Havlíčkův Brod	Czech2	42	1	7	8	64	8	3	2	5	16
2008–09	HC Havlíčkův Brod	Czech2	45	5	7	12	63	4	0	1	1	2
2009–10	HC Havlíčkův Brod	Czech2	45	5	12	17	73	5	3	1	4	6
2010–11	HC Mountfield	Czech	43	1	4	5	46	5	1	0	1	12
2011–12	HC Slavia Praha	Czech	46	1	1	2	42	—	—	—	—	—
2012–13	HC Slavia Praha	Czech	9	0	0	0	10	—	—	—	—	—
2012–13	HC Berounští Medvědi	Czech2	38	1	15	16	52	—	—	—	—	—
2013–14	HC Stadion Litoměřice	Czech2	51	4	15	19	60	6	1	0	1	18
2014–15	HC Slavia Praha	Czech	11	1	0	1	4	—	—	—	—	—
2014–15	HC Stadion Litoměřice	Czech2	52	8	16	24	95	3	0	0	0	0
2015–16	HC Stadion Litoměřice	Czech2	41	4	15	19	115	3	0	0	0	12
2016–17	HC Stadion Litoměřice	Czech2	52	1	14	15	64	—	—	—	—	—
2017–18	Étoile Noire de Strasbourg	Ligue Magnus	42	0	4	4	64	—	—	—	—	—
2018–19	HC Čáslav	Czech4	—	—	—	—	—	—	—	—	—	—
2019–20	HC Čáslav	Czech4	22	6	5	11	42	5	1	1	2	6
Czech totals			112	3	5	8	104	5	1	0	1	12
Czech2 totals			456	33	115	148	702	34	8	4	12	52
