= Ernst Schulze =

Ernst Schulze may refer to:

- Gottlob Ernst Schulze (1761–1833), a German philosopher
- Ernst Schulze (poet) (1789–1817), a German Romantic poet
- Ernst Schulze (chemist) (1840–1912), a German Chemist and the grandson of Gottlob Ernst Schulze
- Sadananda (1908–1977), born Ernst-Georg Schulze, a German Gaudiya Vaishnavist swami
