= Michael Schultheis =

American painter

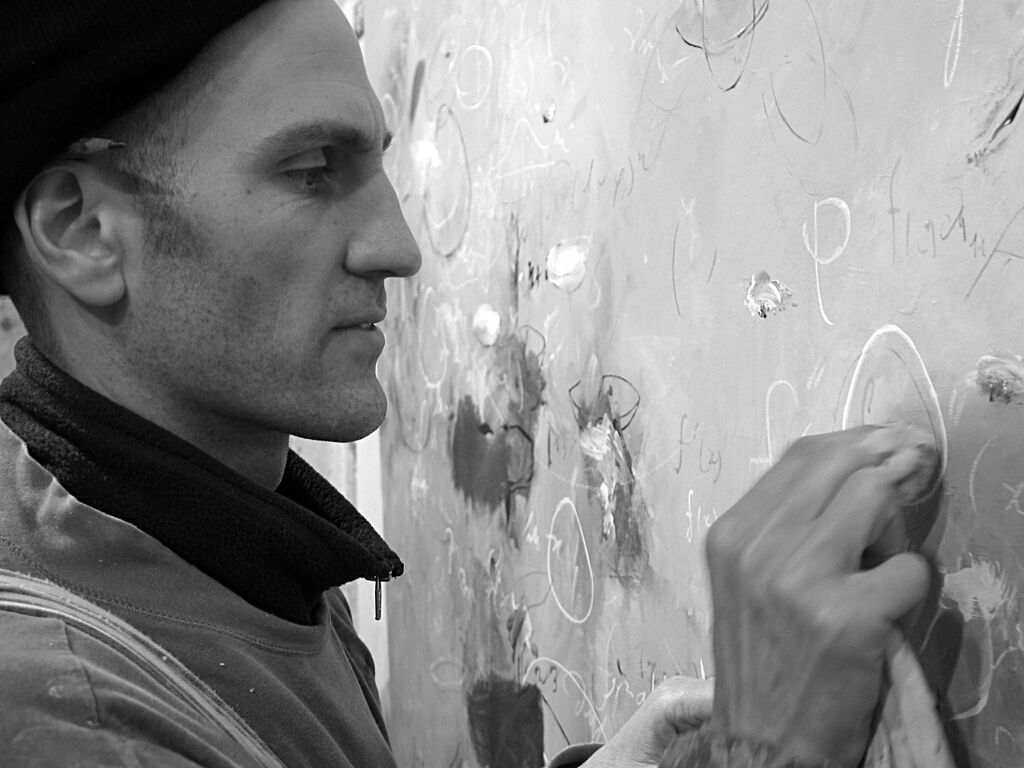
Michael Schultheis

Michael Schultheis (born October 10, 1967) is an American painter trained in mathematics and economics. He paints geometric forms and their corresponding real equations to conceptually render the geometry through an art style termed "analytical expressionism”. His work is part of collections at the Tacoma Art Museum, the National Academy of Sciences and Washington State University.

Schultheis grew up in Washington state and holds advanced degrees in economics from Washington State University and Cornell University, and spent a year abroad in Siena, Italy studying history and Italian.

During his early years working in software development, Schultheis said he was captivated and inspired by the beauty of the half-erased chalkboards and whiteboards, with its many layers of mathematical formulas, equations and ghost-like erasures and shapes. He said his paintings are a visually expressive approach to analytical ideas, expanding the definition of conceptual geometry in art. Schultheis says he likens the canvas to chalkboard and paints math equations, their geometric forms that visually render in his mind, and the relationships that develop into geometric models describing narratives about the human condition. His paintings present these geometric equations and forms through a visual mathematical process, language and rendering.

Schultheis has lectured at Washington State University, Seattle University and The Wentworth Institute of Technology with regards to his art and its relation to mathematics.

== Collections ==
Schultheis' work can be found in the collections of:

- Tacoma Art Museum (Tacoma, Washington)
- National Academy of Sciences (Washington D.C.)
- Wentworth Institute of Technology (Boston, Massachusetts)
- Washington State University (Pullman, Washington)
- Novo Nordisk
- Howard Hughes Medical Institute
