= Fritz Schultze =

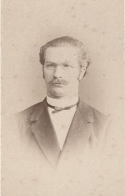
- Fritz Schultze
- Born: Karl August Julius Fritz Schultze; 1846; Celle
- Died: 1908 (aged 61–62); Dresden

Fritz Schultze (pron shụl'tse) (1846–1908) was a German philosopher.

Schultze was born at Celle and educated at Jena, Göttingen, and Munich. He was professor extraordinary of philosophy at Jena in 1875 and 1876, when he was appointed professor of philosophy and pedagogy at the Royal Polytechnic Institute of Dresden.

== Publications ==
- Der Fetischismus: Ein Beitrag zur Anthropologie und Religionsgeschichte (1871)
- Geschichte der Philosophie der Renaissance (1st vol. 1874)
- Philosophie der Naturwissenschaft (1881–82)
- Stammbaum der Philosophie (1890)
- Der Zeitgeist in Deutschland, seine Wandlung im 19 und seine muthmassliche Gestaltung im 20 Jahrhundert (1894)
