= Šolc =

Šolc may refer to:

- Antonín Šolc (1928–1996), Czech footballer
- František Šolc (1920–1996), Czech French horn player
- Josip Šolc or Josip Scholz (1898–1945), Croatian footballer and member of the Croatian Home Guard
- Ivan Šolc, Czech physicist and inventor, the namesake of asteroid 3490 Šolc
