= Fassbender =

Fassbender, also spelled Faßbender, is a German surname. It is a variant of the word Fassbinder, which means "cooper". Notable people with the name include:

== People named Fassbender ==
- Hedwig Fassbender (born 1954), German mezzo-soprano and academic
- Heike Fassbender (born 1963), German mathematician
- Heinrich Fassbender (1899–1971), German politician
- Joseph Fassbender (1903–1974), German painter and draughtsman
- Jürgen Fassbender (born 1948), German tennis player
- Max Fassbender (1868–1934), German cinematographer
- Michael Fassbender (born 1977), German-Irish actor
- Peter Fassbender (born 1946), Canadian politician
- Susan Fassbender (1959–1991), English singer, songwriter, and musician

== People named Faßbender ==
- Heribert Faßbender (born 1941), German sports journalist
- Morgan Faßbender (born 1998), German footballer
- Zdenka Faßbender (1879–1954), Czech-born German operatic dramatic soprano

== See also ==
- Myrtle Fahsbender (1907–2001), American lighting expert
- Rainer Werner Fassbinder (1945–1982), German film director, dramatist and actor
- Brigitte Fassbaender (born 1939), German opera singer and stage director
- Willi Domgraf-Fassbaender (1897–1978), German opera singer, father of Brigitte
- Erwin Fassbind (born 1957), Swiss bobsledder
