= Vanessa Schulz =

South African filmmaker and political activist (b.1969)

- Born: 1969 (age 56–57); Johannesburg, South Africa
- Occupations: documentary filmmaker, director, producer, writer, editor, photographer and political activist
- Known for: Award-winning films
- Notable work: Cull of the Wild; Cost of Freedom

Vanessa Schulz (born 7 August 1969) is a South African born documentary filmmaker, director, producer, writer, editor, photographer and political activist. In 1998, she established 21paradigm.com; her projects include the award-winning Cull of the Wild and Cost of Freedom.

== Early life ==
Schulz was born in Johannesburg, South Africa, to German immigrant parents. Schulz's father had defected from the German Democratic Republic (GDR). Her family travelled to the former East Germany during the 1970s, where some of her relatives still lived behind the Iron Curtain and the Berlin Wall. She attended primary and secondary school in Rivonia, and graduated from Inscape Study Centre with a Diploma in Graphic Design.

Schulz qualified as a NAUI scuba diving instructor in Durban, South Africa in 1991. She worked as a dive instructor on the Indian Ocean island of Grand Comore Island from 1991 to 1993. She later qualified as a deep diving instructor and instructor of underwater photography. Schulz studied at Cape Town Film & Television School in Cape Town, South Africa in 1994.

== Career ==
In 1995, Schulz emigrated to the United States, where she got her first job in television as a production staffer at a local affiliate in Ketchum, Idaho. Schulz worked as assistant producer for two years on Wolves at our Door, which won two Emmy awards for the Discovery Channel. She worked freelance as a camerawoman and producer for NBC, National Geographic and Fox Television.

In 1998, to follow her interest in filmmaking related to conservation and animal rights, she incorporated 21st Paradigm, an independent, non-profit documentary film company. The first 21st Paradigm production was the independent film Sabi Sabi: Adventure for the Soul. The production was filmed on the Sabi Sabi private game reserve in South Africa and explores human fascination with the predatory behavior of carnivores. In 1999, upon seeing Schulz's show-reel, Bertram van Munster, Executive Producer of Fox Television's “Wild Things,” hired Schulz to work as the show's field producer and camera operator.

In 2000, Schulz began volunteering her film-making skills to the animal welfare movement, including a collaboration with the Animal Legal Defense Fund on a project examining otter trapping in Missouri. This led directly to Cull of the Wild: The Truth behind Trapping, in concert with the Animal Protection Institute. Next she made Cost of Freedom, which garnered a number of film festival awards, including a gold Remy award at the 37th Worldfest Houston International Film Festival and a special jury award at the 2003 Jackson Hole Wildlife Film Festival in Wyoming “for a filmmaker with the courage to pursue a difficult and controversial topic.”

Schulz was unable to raise funds for her next production about Captain Paul Watson and the Sea Shepherd Conservation Society. Her short film, Sea Shepherd, was the precursor for several documentaries about Captain Watson, including “Whale Wars” on Animal Planet. Schulz returned to her native South Africa in 2004 where she worked as producer, writer, editor and camera operator for Aquavision Television Productions.

Schulz moved to the United States in 2007 to devote full time to 21st Paradigm. She produced and directed Permaculture: A Quiet Revolution, a documentary about the 8th International Permaculture Convergence in Brazil. In 2009, after watching the “Hero Dog” video] on YouTube, Schulz went to Chile and created a feature-length documentary Lost Dogs, about street dogs in a global, industrialized culture.

Active in the world of dog rescue, Schulz freelanced for Animal Balance to document the destruction of natural heritage on the Galapagos Islands by cats and dogs and to advocate for spaying and neutering.

As well as filmmaking, Schulz is an AYTT-certified yoga instructor, and participates in Buddhism, white-water kayaking, and paragliding. Schulz qualified as a NAUI scuba diving instructor under the course direction of Jim Hicks, in Durban, South Africa in 1991. She worked as a dive instructor for Island Ventures on the Indian Ocean island of Grand Comore Island from 1991 to 1993. She further qualified as a deep diving instructor and instructor of underwater photography.

== Filmography ==
=== Film ===
- Wolves at our Door – Assistant Producer (1998)
- Adventure For the Soul – Director, Producer, Camera, Editor (1999)
- Cull of the Wild – Director, Co-Producer, Camera, Writer, Editor (2002)
- Cost of Freedom – Director, Producer, Camera, Editor (2003)
- Permaculture: A Quiet Revolution – Director, Producer, Camera, Writer, Editor (2008)
- Lost Dogs – Director, Producer, Camera, Writer, Editor (2012)

=== Television ===
- National Geographic: (assistant camera)
- NBC: The Travel Channel with Peter Greenberg (camera operator)
- Fox TV: Wild Things (Field producer, camera operator)
