= Charles Schultz =

Charles Schultz may refer to:

- Charles Schultz (American football) (1916–1989), American football player
- Charles Schultz (politician) (1858–1928), American politician

== See also ==
- Charles M. Schulz (1922–2000), American cartoonist and creator of Peanuts
- Charles Schultze (1924–2016), American economist
