= Schultheiß =

Head of a municipality in medieval Germany

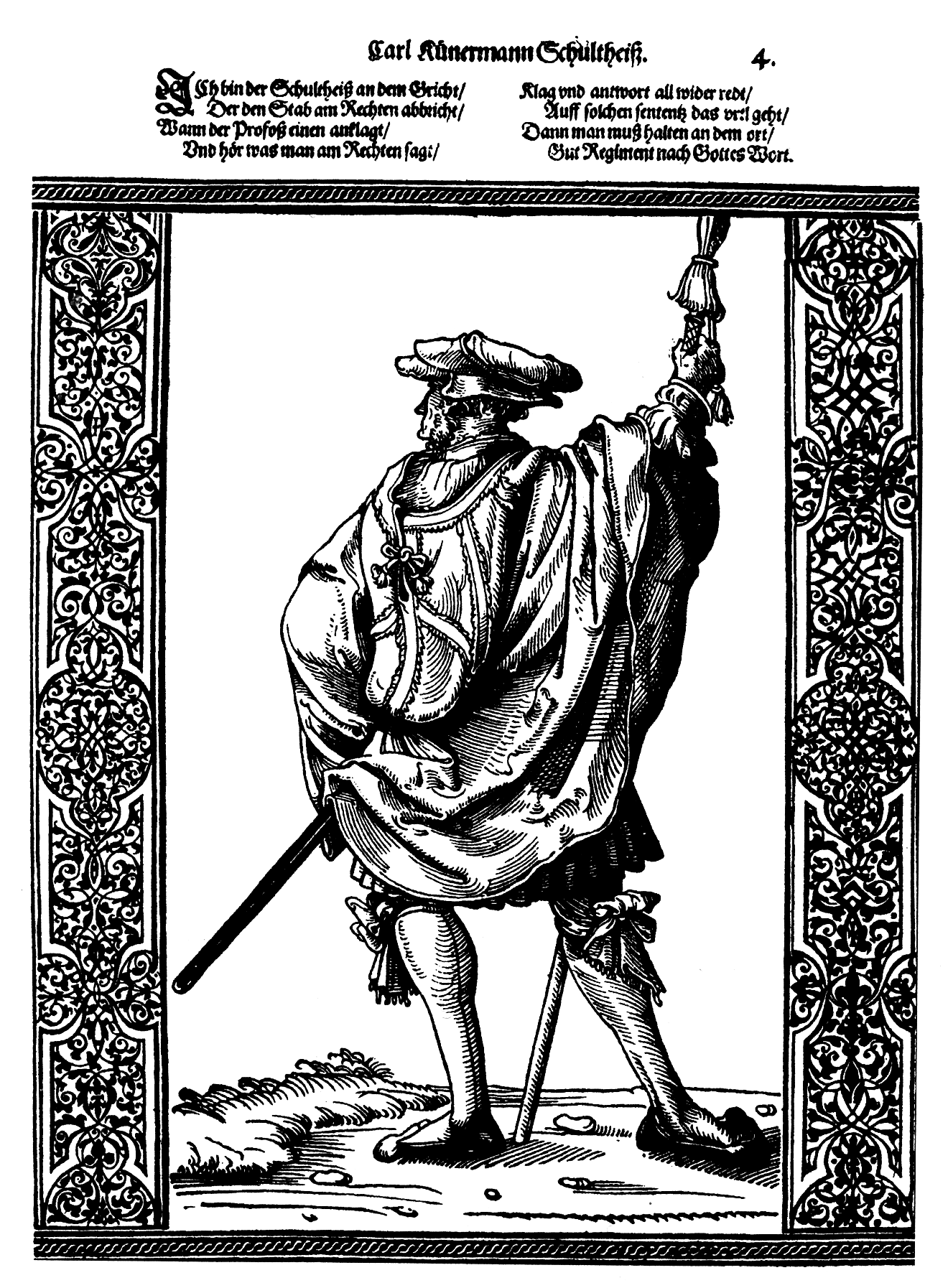
A Schultheiß in the 16th century

In medieval Germany, the Schultheiß (German: [ˈʃʊltaɪs]) was the head of a municipality (akin to today's office of mayor), a Vogt or an executive official of the ruler. As official (villicus) it was his duty to order his assigned village or county (villicatio) to pay the taxes and perform the services due to the ruler. The name originates from this function: Schuld 'debt' + heißen 'to order'. Later, the title was also used for the head of a town (Stadtschultheiß) or village (Dorfschultheiß).

The office held by a Schultheiß was called Scholtisei, Scholtisse (around 1400), Schultessy, Schultissīe, Schultissei (15th century); Latinized forms: sculdasia (10th century), scultetia (13th century).

The title first appears in the Edictum Rothari of 643 AD, where it is spelled in post-Roman Latin as sculdahis. This title reappears again in the Lombard laws of Liutprand in 723 AD. The title was originally spelled in Old High German as sculdheizo and in Middle High German as Schultheize; it was Latinised as scultetus or sculteus. Alternative spellings include Schultheis, Schulte or Schulze, or in Switzerland Schultheiss. It also appears in several European languages: In Hungarian as soltész, in Slovak as šoltýs and škultét, in Italian as scoltetto and sculdascio, in Medieval Latin as sculdasius, in Polish as sołtys, in Romanian as șoltuz, and in Dutch as schout.

== Switzerland ==
In the territory of present-day Switzerland, the office of Schultheiß developed distinctive local forms, particularly in urban contexts. In Swiss usage, especially in French-speaking areas, the office was known as avoyer (Italian: scoltetto; Latin: scultetus).

In contrast to other regions where similar offices were often associated with rural communities, in Switzerland the avoyer was encountered primarily in cities. The office combined judicial and administrative functions and gradually evolved into the chief magistracy of major city-states such as Lucerne, Bern, Fribourg, and Solothurn. From the late Middle Ages onward, its role became broadly comparable to that of the burgomaster in Basel and in the cities of northeastern Switzerland.

In the Canton of Lucerne, the German title ''Schultheiss'' (French: ''avoyer'') remained in official use for the annually rotating president of the cantonal government until 2007.

== Modern uses ==
Schultheiß is also the basis for one of the most common German surnames, existing in many variations such as Schulz, Schultz, Scholz, etc., corresponding to the local variants of the pronunciation of the office. It also produced surnames in a number of other European cultures: see Schultheiss (surname) for a table.

In Poland, sołtys is the name given to the elected head of a rural subdivision (usually a village, or part of a large village) known as a sołectwo.

== See also ==
- Similar medieval offices: Vogt, Meier, Villicus, Ealdorman
- Reichsvogt, nearly equivalent office in medieval Switzerland
- Sheriff, the equivalent office in medieval England
- Patel, the equivalent office in medieval Gujarat
