= Scholz (surname) =

Scholz is a German surname. It is the East Central German and Silesian version of the name Schulz, Schultz, Schultheiss.

== Geographical distribution ==
As of 2014, 86.6% of all known bearers of the surname Scholz were residents of Germany, 5.8% of the United States, 1.7% of Austria, 1.1% of Brazil and 1.1% of Australia.

In Germany, the frequency of the surname was higher than the national average in the following states:

1. Saxony (1:315)
2. Brandenburg (1:361)
3. Saxony-Anhalt (1:429)
4. Thuringia (1:518)
5. Lower Saxony (1:541)
6. North Rhine-Westphalia (1:695)

== People ==
- Alexander Scholz (born 1992), Danish footballer
- Anke Scholz (born 1978), German swimmer
- Arno Scholz (1904–1971), German journalist
- Arnold Scholz (1904–1942), German mathematician
- Barbara Scholz (1947–2011), American philosopher of science
- Bernhard Scholz (1835–1916), German composer
- Carlos Scholz (born 1994), Spanish actor
- Carter Scholz (born 1953), American speculative fiction author and music composer
- Corinna Scholz (born 1989), German curler
- Erhard Scholz (born 1947),German historian of mathematics
- Ernst Scholz (politician, born 1874) (1874–1932), German politician
- Ernst Scholz (politician, born 1913) (1913–1986), German diplomat and politician
- Franz Scholz (1909–1998), German priest and professor of theology
- Fritz von Scholz (1896–1944), Austrian (Austro-Hungarian) Oberleutnant and later German SS-Commander
- Gene Scholz (1917–2005), American professional basketball player
- Georg Scholz (1890–1945), German painter
- Gregory Scholz (born 1981), German politician
- Gudrun Scholz (born 1940), former German field hockey player
- Heiko Scholz (born 1966), former German footballer
- Heinrich Scholz (entomologist) (1812–1859), German physician and entomologist
- Heinrich Scholz (1884–1956), German theologian and logician
- Heinrich Karl Scholz (1880–1937), American sculptor and medalist
- Ingrid Scholz, a German rower
- Jackson Scholz (1897–1986), American athlete
- János Scholz (c. 1904–1993), Hungarian-born American cellist and art collector
- Johann Martin Augustin Scholz (1794–1852), a German Bible scholar
- Karl Scholz (born c. 1960), American economist and academic
- Katharina Scholz (born 1983), German field hockey player
- Lilly Scholz (born 1903, date of death unknown), Austrian pair skater
- Marita Scholz (born 1977), German rower
- Michael Scholz (born 1949), German singer, composer and producer
- Olaf Scholz (born 1958), Chancellor of Germany from 2021 to 2025
- Paul Scholz (1902–1995), German journalist and politician
- Peta Scholz (née Squire, born 1976), Australian netball player
- Robert O. Scholz (1895–1978), American architect
- Roman Karl Scholz (1912–1944), Austrian priest and Nazi resistance activist
- Ronny Scholz (born 1978), former professional road racing cyclist
- Rupert Scholz (born 1937), German politician
- Tom Scholz (Donald Thomas Scholz, born 1947), American rock musician, inventor, engineer, and philanthropist
- W. E. Scholz (1807/1808–1866), German composers and conductor

== See also ==
- Scholz conjecture, after Arnold Scholz
- Scholz Garten, Beer Garden, in downtown Austin, Texas
- Scholz Research & Development, Inc.
- Scholz's Star, a star that passed near the Sun 70 000 years ago, named after its discoverer, German astronomer Ralf-Dieter Scholz
