= Schultz, West Virginia =

Schultz
- Unincorporated community
- Location within the state of West Virginia Schultz (the United States)
- Coordinates: 39°19′12″N 81°14′24″W
- Country: United States
- State: West Virginia
- County: Pleasants
- Elevation: 728 ft (222 m)
- Time zone: UTC-5 (Eastern (EST))
  - Summer (DST): UTC-4 (EDT)
- GNIS ID: 1546504

Schultz is an unincorporated community in Pleasants County, West Virginia, United States.

The community was named after Christian Schultz, a pioneer settler.
