= Mark Schultz =

Mark Schultz may refer to:

- Mark Schultz (comics) (born 1955), American comic book creator and illustrator
- Mark Schultz (musician) (born 1970), Christian singer-songwriter
  - Mark Schultz (album)
- Mark Schultz (wrestler) (born 1960), American wrestler, 1984 Olympic gold medalist

== See also ==
- Martin Schultz (disambiguation)
- Markus Schulz (born 1975), German-American DJ and music producer
- Marvin Schulz (born 1995), German footballer
