= Henry Albert Schultens =

Dutch linguist

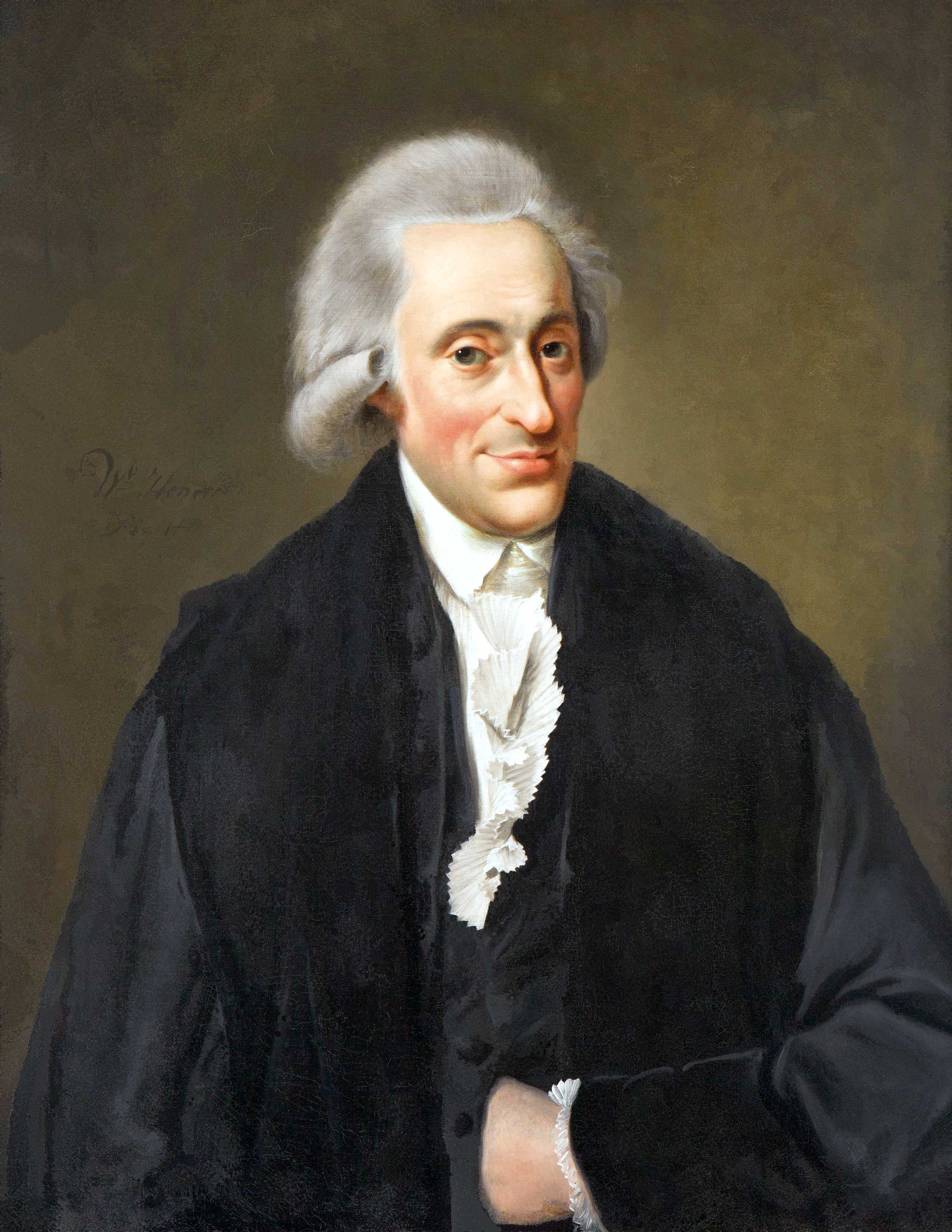
- Born: Hendrik Albert Schultens; 25 February 1749; Herborn
- Died: 12 August 1793; Leiden

Hendrik Albert Schultens (25 February 1749 – 12 August 1793) was a third generation Dutch linguist.

== Life ==
Shultens was born in Herborn. He was the son of Jan Jacob Schultens, orientalist and professor at Leiden University and Suzanna Amalia Schramm, and was the grandson of Albert Schultens. Schultens studied orientalism in Leiden. He traveled to England and studied at Wadham College, Oxford, where he became Magister Artium, honoris causa, in 1773. He became professor in Eastern languages, first in Amsterdam, and then in Leiden. He married Catharina Elisabeth de Sitter.

Schultens published a translation (to Latin) and edition of Persian scholar Al-Zamakhshari, "Anthologia sententiarum Arabicarum: Cum scholiis Zamachsjarii" (1772). He was also the author of an edition of ancient Eastern fables, "Pars versionis arabicae libri Colailah wa Dimnah, sive Fabularum Bidpai philosophi Indi" (1786).

He died in Leiden in 1793, leaving an edition of Al-Maydani unfinished.
