= Shultz =

Schultz is a surname. Notable people with the surname include:

- Arnold Shultz (1886–1931), American fiddler and guitarist
- Brad Shultz (born 1982), American musician
- Charlotte Mailliard Shultz (1933–2021), American socialite and philanthropist
- Clark Shultz (born 1957), American politician
- Emanuel Shultz (1819–1912), American politician
- George Shultz (1920–2021), former US Secretary of State
- Henry Shultz (1776–1851), colorful entrepreneur in Northern Germany and the American South
- Howard Shultz Miller (1879–1970), American politician
- Johan Martin Shultz (1740–1787), American surgeon
- Johnny Shultz (1909–1932), American football player
- Lenhart Shultz (1889–1964), American politician
- Lillie Shultz (1904–1981), American journalist, writer, and activist
- Lori Shultz, American politician
- Matt Shultz (born 1983), American singer, songwriter, and musician
- Mary Jane Shultz (born 1948), American professor
- Mikhail Shultz (1919–2006), Soviet and Russian physical chemist and artist
- Reynolds Shultz (1921–2000), American politician
- Richard H. Shultz (1947–2025), American scholar of international security studies
- Searles G. Shultz (1897–1975), New York politician
- Ted Shultz (1893–1986), American college football player and coach
- Thomas Shultz, Rear Admiral in the United States Navy
- Toots Shultz (1888–1959), American Major League Baseball pitcher
- Tyler Shultz, American researcher, founder, and whistleblower
