= Jan Jacob Schultens =

Dutch orientalist (1716–1788)

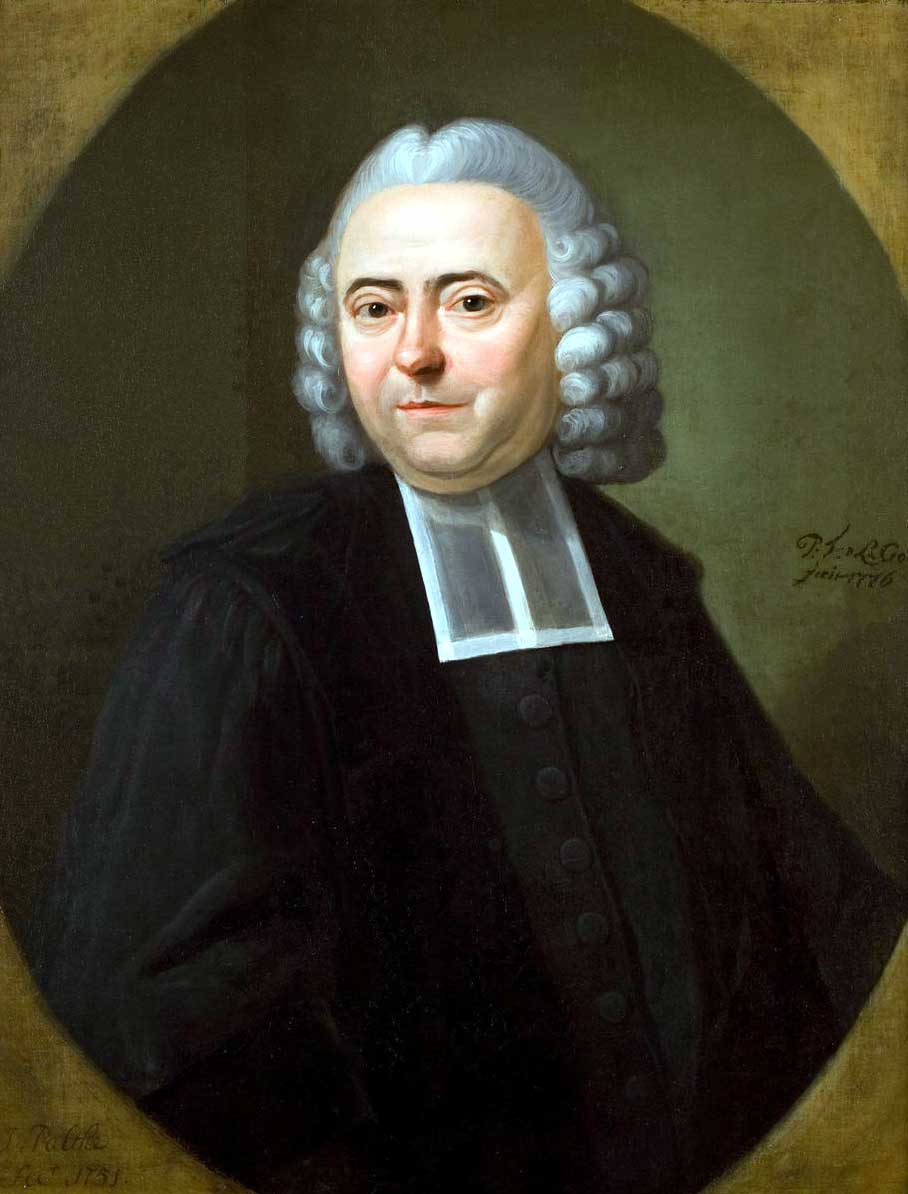
Jan Jacob Schultens (1716-1788)

Jan Jacob Schultens (19 September 1716 in Franeker – 27 November 1788 in Leiden) was a Dutch orientalist. He was the son of philologist Albert Schultens. In 1742 he obtained his doctorate in theology at Leiden, later serving as a professor of Oriental languages at Herborn (1744–1749), and afterwards succeeded to his father's chair at Leiden. His son was the Dutch linguist Henry Albert Schultens.

== Selected publications ==
- De utilitate dialectorum orientalium ad tuendam integritatem cod. hebr, 1742.
- Oratio de fructibus redundantibus ex penitiore linguarum orientalium cognitione, 1749.
- Bibliotheca Schultensiana, sive, Catalogus librorum, quos collegit vir clarissimus Johannes Jacobus Schultensius, 1780.
- "The Albert and Jan Jacob Schultens Manuscript Collection", publisher: Princeton Theological Seminary Library, 1993.
