= Schulten =

Schulten is a surname. It may refer to:

- Adolf Schulten (1870–1960), German historian and archaeologist
- Alcuin Schulten (born 1972), Dutch figure skater
- John William Schulten (1821–1875), also spelled Johann Wilhelm, 19th-century chess master from Germany and the United States
- Klaus Schulten (1947–2016), German-American computational biophysicist and Professor of Physics
- Rudolf Schulten (1923–1996), university professor and main developer of the pebble bed reactor design
- Susan Schulten, American historian and professor
- Ton Schulten (1938–2025), Dutch painter
