= Helga Schultz =

German historian (1941–2016)

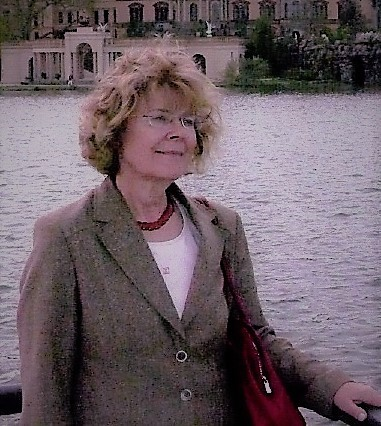
- Helga Schultz (2009)
- Born: 16 August 1941; Schwerin, Germany
- Died: 7 March 2016 (aged 74); Berlin, Germany
- Occupation: Historian

Academic background
- Education: University of Rostock

Academic work
- Institutions: European University Viadrina in Frankfurt
- Main interests: economic and social history of Europe

Helga Schultz (German: Helga Schultz; 16 August 1941 – 7 March 2016) was a German historian whose work focused on the economic and social history of Europe.

== Biography ==
Schultz graduated from University of Rostock in 1964, where she majored in history teaching. A year later she received her diploma in history and became a research assistant and later senior assistant at the history section of the university.

In 1969 she received her doctorate in Rostock with the dissertation "Die Krise der feudalen Ratsverfassung. Dargestellt am Beispiel Rostocks 1748–1788". In 1978 she received her postdoctoral degree with the dissertation "Das Landhandwerk in der Epoche des Übergangs zum Kapitalismus. Vergleichende Studie und regionale Untersuchung Mecklenburg-Schwerin".

In 1977 Schultz became a staff member at the Academy of Sciences of the GDR (AdW) in Berlin at the Department of feudalism. At the academy, she became head of the "Regional History" research unit of the Central Institute of History in 1983 and held this position until the liquidation of the AdW till 1991. In 1986 she was appointed professor at the AdW.

From 1990 to 1993 she was employed by the "KAI e.V. – Koordinierungs- und Abwicklungseinrichtung für die Institute der Akademie der Wissenschaften der DDR". In 1992 she accepted a visiting professorship at the University of Gothenburg in Sweden. In 1993 she accepted an offer from the European University Viadrina in Frankfurt (Oder) as a chair in economic and social history of modern times. In 2006, she became tenure professor. From 2007 to 2009, Schultz was a visiting professor at the Institute of Applied Linguistics at Adam Mickiewicz University in Poznan (Poland).

Schultz was a member of the Johann Gottfried Herder Research Council. Since 1997 she was a member of the Leibniz-Sozietät der Wissenschaften zu Berlin. She was editor of Frankfurter Studien zur Grenzregion (later Frankfurter Studien zur Wirtschafts- und Sozialgeschichte Ostmitteleuropas) published by Berliner Wissenschafts-Verlag.

Schultz died in Berlin in 2016.
