= Rudziński =

Rudziński (feminine: Rudzińska, plural: Rudzińscy) is a Polish surname. It may refer to:

- Michalina Rudzińska (born 2002), a Polish chess master
- Paul Rudzinski (born 1956), an American football athlete
- Steve Rudzinski, an American filmmaker and actor
- Witold Rudziński (1913–2004), a Polish composer and conductor

A Lithuanized version of the surname, Rudzinskas may refer to:

- Alfons Rudzinskas, a Soviet sprint canoer
- Nikolay "Mykolas" Rudzinskas (1933–2006), a Soviet sprint canoer
