= Walter Schultz =

Walter Schultz may refer to:

- Walter Schultz (Gauleiter) (1874–1953), Nazi Party official and politician
- Walter Schultz (theologian) (1900–1957), German theologian and Luthern bishop

== See also ==
- Walter Schultze (1894–1979), German physician, state health official, and Nazi Party politician
- Walter Schulze-Mittendorff (1893–1976), German costume designer, production designer, special effects artist, and sculptor
- Walter Schulz (disambiguation)
