= Schultes =

Schultes is a surname. Notable people with the surname include:

- Christl-Marie Schultes (1904–1976), Bavarian aviator
- Josef August Schultes (1773–1831), Austrian botanist and professor in Vienna, father of Julius
- Julius Hermann Schultes (1804–1840), Austrian botanist in Vienna
- Richard Evans Schultes (1915–2001), American ethnobotanist
