= John Schultz (writer) =

John Schultz (July 28, 1932 – May 6, 2017) was an American writer of fiction and non-fiction. He was also a teacher of writing, the creator of the Story Workshop method of writing instruction, and an emeritus professor in the Fiction Writing Department at Columbia College Chicago. He was born on July 28, 1932, in Iberia, Missouri, served as an army medic from 1953 to 1955, and then worked in Chicago as a writer and teacher. He died in 2017 at the age of 84 in his home of Riverside, a suburb of Chicago.

== The Story Workshop ==
Schultz originated the Story Workshop method of teaching writing in 1965. He practiced the method at Columbia College, teaching many writers and training teachers in the Workshop techniques. The Story Workshop method "focuses on helping you hear your own individual voice and provides a supportive, interactive, and challenging environment for developing your reading, writing, listening, speaking, critical thinking, and imaginative problem-solving capacities." The Story Workshop Institute was founded to bring the method to elementary and secondary classrooms and other forums for writing instruction.

== The 1968 Democratic National Convention ==
Schultz covered the 1968 Democratic National Convention for the Evergreen Review and later wrote No One Was Killed (1969), a first-person account of his experiences both in the International Amphitheater where the convention was held and on the streets and in the parks of Chicago where antiwar protesters gathered, rallied, and clashed with police. He also witnessed the subsequent trial of eight participants for conspiracy and inciting riot (the Chicago Seven), which he wrote about in Motion Will Be Denied, (1972), later republished as The Conspiracy Trial of the Chicago Seven.

== List of works ==
- The Tongues of Men (Chicago: Big Table Publishing, 1969): three short novels and eight short stories
- No One Was Killed: Documentation and Meditation: Convention Week, Chicago--August 1968 (Chicago: Big Table Publishing, 1969; reprinted as No One Was Killed: The Democratic National Convention, August 1968, with a new introduction by Todd Gitlin and a new afterword by the author, Chicago: The University of Chicago Press, 2009, ISBN 978-0-226-74078-2)
- Motion Will Be Denied: A New Report on the Chicago Conspiracy Trial. (New York: Morrow, 1972; reprinted as The Conspiracy Trial of the Chicago Seven, with an introduction by Carl Oglesby, Chicago: The University of Chicago Press, 2020, ISBN 9780226760742)
- Writing from Start to Finish : The Story Workshop Basic Forms Rhetoric-Reader (Montclair, NJ: Boynton/Cook Publishers, 1982)
- The Teacher's Manual for Writing from Start to Finish (Montclair, NJ: Boynton/Cook Publishers, 1983)
