= Johnathan Schultz =

- Born: Johnathan Richard Schultz; April 23, 1982 (age 44); Welkom, Free State, South Africa
- Website: thejohnathanschultz.com

Johnathan Schultz (born 23 April 1982, Welkom, Free State) is a South African visual artist residing in the United Kingdom. Schultz works with mediums such as precious metals and stones, as well as paint and resin.

== Early life ==
Johnathan Richard Schultz was born on 23 April 1982 in Welkom, Free State, South Africa.

== Career ==
Schultz works with materials such as platinum, gold, silver, diamonds, resins, paint, and historical artifacts, alongside repurposed ready-mades. Unlike traditional gold leafing, his method involves layering multiple coats, sometimes as many as four to five, enhanced with a unique clear coat to amplify light and luminosity. Floral motifs are used in Schultz's work, often juxtaposed with precious metals.

Schultz's influences include Nelson Mandela.

In 2024, Schultz authored The Gilded Truth: Manifesto of Unyielding Defiance.

Schultz's artwork is owned by art collectors and others, such as Bill Foley, Kevin O'Leary, Chef Gordon Ramsay, Cindy Crawford, Michael Chow (Mr. Chow), Chef Todd English, Rashad Jennings, The Black Eyed Peas, Matthew Judon, Louis Oliver, Christian Siriano, DJ Black Coffee, Taylor Fritz, Aaron Donald, Hannah Waddingham, Udonis Haslem, Rob Lowe, Sir Rod Stewart, Charles Woodson, Gil Dezer, Marc Anthony, Shania Twain, and Robert De Niro.

== Notable artwork ==
- "Out of the Darkness" (2021): Inspired by Nelson Mandela's fingerprint on his arrest warrant, this piece features over 9,220 diamonds (895 carats) set in 18kt white gold. The diamonds, round brilliant G/H color VS+ clarity, explore the interplay between light and dark.
- "Refraction of a Legacy" (2021): A 10 ft. x 10 ft. chandelier made of five rings, each moving in the opposite direction. Crafted from historic fence material from Robben Island, South Africa, where Nelson Mandela was imprisoned, this chandelier is adorned with 2,684 round brilliant cut diamonds (201 carats) set in 14kt white gold, symbolizing struggle and truth in South Africa's history.
- "Window to Life" (2024): A 3D lightbox installation debuted at Schultz's solo exhibition "Follow the Flowers" in Las Vegas. The piece features a salvaged window from Mandela's boarding school, with hand-painted interior walls lit from within.
- "Ordinal Diamonds | Inscribed Perfect Palinception 997,999,979,999,799" (2023): An inscription on Bitcoin, executed in 2023 and sold by Sotheby's on March 5, 2024.
