= Tanja Schultz =

German computer scientist

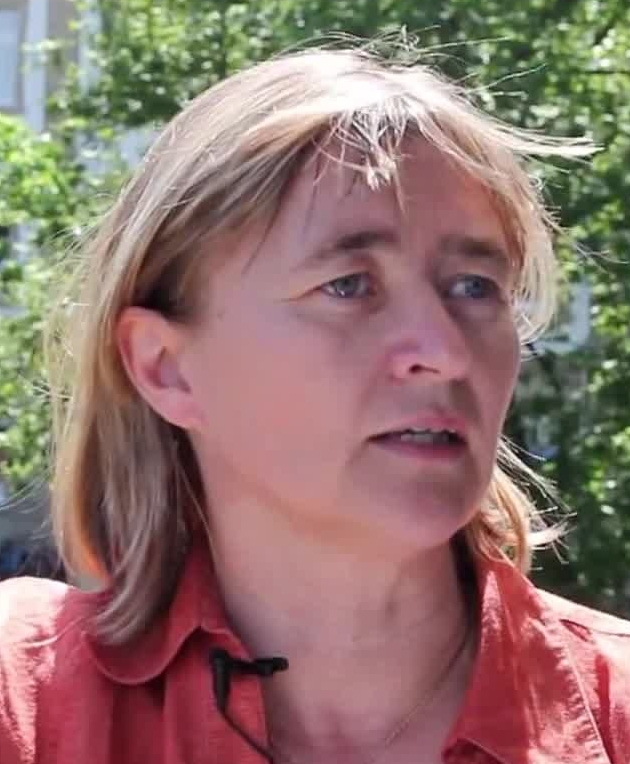
Tanja Schultz in 2012

Tanja Schultz is a German computer scientist specializing in speech processing. She is professor of computer science at the University of Bremen and the former president of the International Speech Communication Association.

== Education and career ==
Schultz was a student at the Karlsruhe Institute of Technology, where she earned a diploma in 1995 and a doctorate in 2000. Her dissertation, Multilingual Speech Recognition, was jointly supervised by Alex Waibel and Dirk Van Compernolle. She was a faculty member at Carnegie Mellon University from 2000 to 2007 and at the Karlsruhe Institute of Technology from 2007 to 2015 before moving to the University of Bremen in 2015.

== Recognition ==
In 2002, Schultz was part of a group of eight researchers who won the Allen Newell Medal for Research Excellence for their work on automatic speech translation.

Schultz was named a fellow of the International Speech Communication Association in 2016 "for contributions to multilingual speech recognition and biosignal processing for human-machine interaction". She is also a member of the European Academy of Sciences and Arts.
