= Schuldt =

Schuldt is a surname. Notable people with the surname include:

- Ewald Schuldt (1914–1987), German prehistorian
- Jimmy Schuldt (born 1995), American ice hockey player
- Matthias Schuldt (born 2000), German gymnast
- Travis Schuldt (born 1974), American actor

== See also ==
- Schildt
