= Peter Schulz =

German politician (1930–2013)

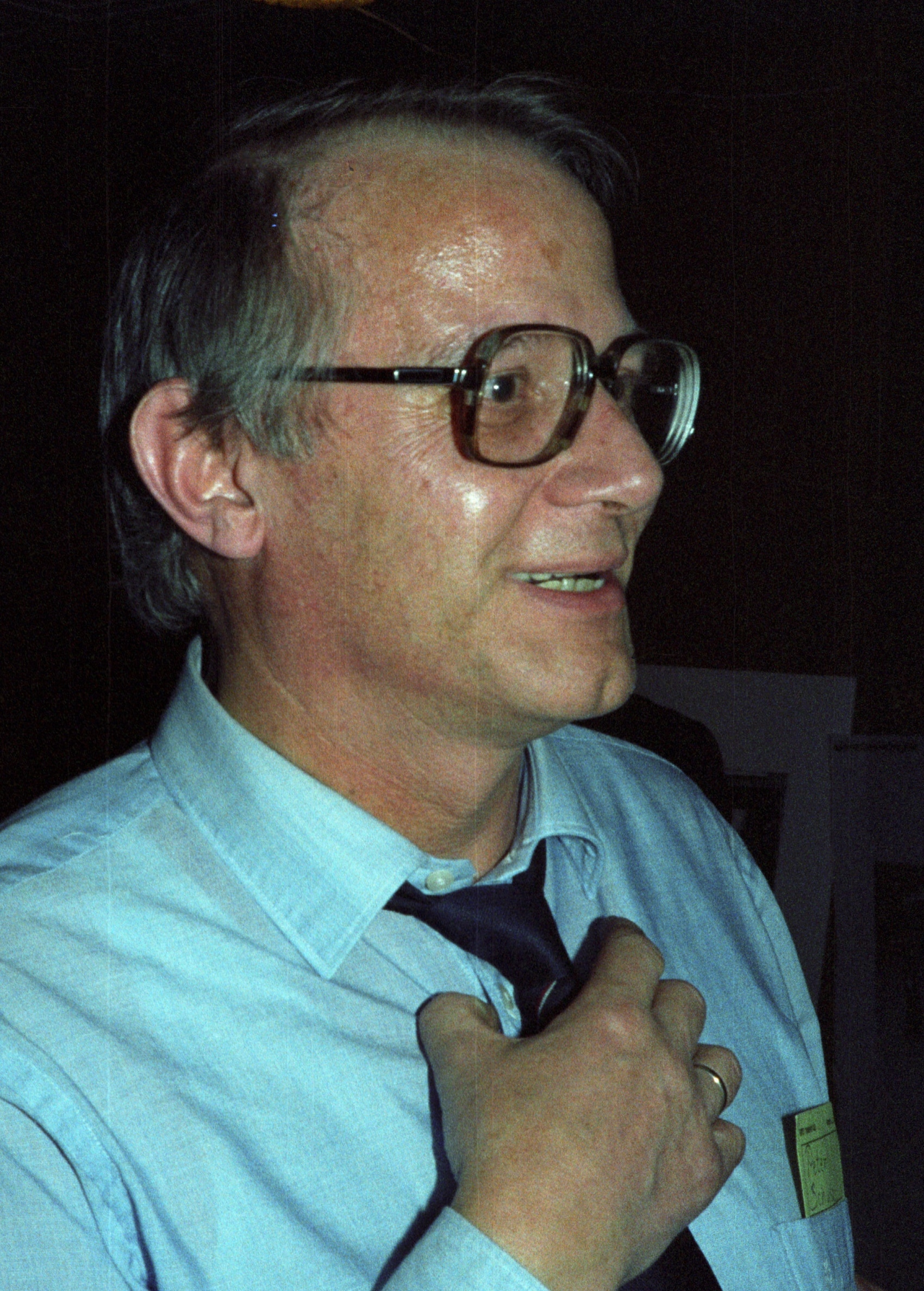

First Mayor of Hamburg
- In office 16 June 1971 – 12 November 1974
- President: Gustav Heinemann; Walter Scheel
- Chancellor: Willy Brandt; Helmut Schmidt
- Preceded by: Herbert Weichmann
- Succeeded by: Hans-Ulrich Klose

Personal details
- Born: 25 April 1930 Rostock
- Died: 17 May 2013 (aged 83) Hamburg
- Party: Social Democratic Party (SPD)

Peter Schulz (25 April 1930 – 17 May 2013) was a German politician, member of the Social Democratic Party (SPD) and First Mayor of Hamburg (1971 – 1974).

== Early life and education ==
Schulz was born in Rostock. He studied law at the University of Hamburg and after his graduation in 1958 Schulz founded his own office.

== Political life ==
In 1961 Schulz was elected in the Hamburg Parliament and served as Senator of Justice from 1966. In 1970 he became Senator for Schools and Youth and Second Mayor. On 16 June 1971 he was elected as First Mayor of Hamburg but resigned after the 1974 election, on 12 November 1974.

From 1978 to 1982 and from 1983 to 1986 Schulz was President of Hamburg Parliament.

Preceded by Herbert Dau	President of the Hamburg Parliament; 1978–1982	Succeeded by Martin Willich
Preceded by Martin Willich	President of the Hamburg Parliament; 1983–1986	Succeeded by Martin Willich
