= Scholtz =

Scholtz is a surname. Notable people with the surname include:

- A.H.M. Scholtz, South African writer in Afrikaans, wrote his first and award-winning novel at the age of 72
- Andrew Henry Martin Scholtz (1923–2004), South African writer
- Bernard Scholtz (born 1990), Namibian cricketer
- Bob Scholtz (born 1936), former American football offensive lineman
- Bruce Scholtz (born 1958), former professional American football player
- Christiaan Scholtz (born 1970), former South African rugby union player
- Friedrich von Scholtz (born 1851), German general, served as commander on the Eastern Front in World War I
- Gertrud Scholtz-Klink née Treusch (1902–1999), fervent Nazi Party member, leader of the National Socialist Women's League in Nazi Germany
- Jean Scholtz, American computer scientist
- Johannes du Plessis Scholtz (1900–1990), South African philologist, art historian, and art collector
- Joseph D. Scholtz, Mayor of Louisville, Kentucky from 1937 to 1941
- Klaus Scholtz (1908–1987), Kapitänleutnant with the Kriegsmarine during World War II
- Lilly Scholtz (married name Gaillard) (born 1903), Austrian pair skater
- Nicolaas Scholtz (cricketer) (born 1986), Namibian cricketer
- Nikala Scholtz (born 1991), professional tennis player from Caledon, South Africa
- Robert A. Scholtz, distinguished professor of Electrical engineering at University of Southern California
- Rudi Scholtz (born 1979), South African-born Namibian cricketer
- Tom Scholtz (born 1947), American rock musician, songwriter, guitarist, keyboardist, inventor, and mechanical engineer

== See also ==
- Armee-Abteilung Scholtz, army level command of the German Army in World War I
- Scholtzia
