= Dominik Szulc =

Polish philosopher and historian (1787–1860)

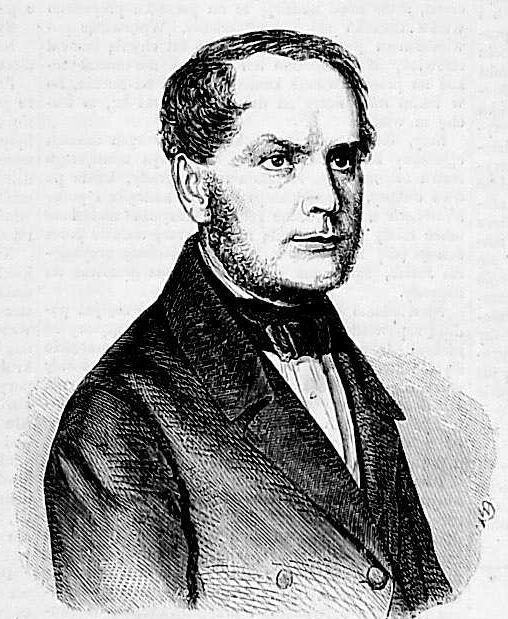
Dominik Szulc

Dominik Szulc (June 10, 1787 – December 27, 1860) was a Polish philosopher and historian. He was a significant precursor to Polish positivism.

In 1814, he began studies at the University of Vilnius. In 1818, became a teacher of Polish language in high school in Vilnius, and from 1823 a teacher of eloquence and logic in the gymnasium of Bialystok. From 1835, he taught at the gymnasium of Lublin, since 1840 in schools in Warsaw. In 1853, he retired. A member of the Kraków Scientific Society correspondence, and the Russian Geographical Society. In his works he defended the thesis of the Polish character of Copernicus. He believed that the discoveries of Copernicus began the development of modern civilization and science.
