= Johan Martin Shultz =

Johan Martin Shultz was a colonial American born in 1740 of German-Swiss descent. Martin fought in the American Revolutionary War and was the only medical doctor at the Battle of King's Mountain, as well as being the only medical doctor in the "Over Mountain Men". After the war, Martin was conscripted by John Sevier to settle the territory claimed after the signing of the Treaty of Dumplin's Creek in 1785. He and Frederick Emert moved into what was later named "Emert's Cove" (now Pittman Center) and became charter citizens of what would become Sevier County, Tennessee. Martin died in 1787 in Emert's Cove.

== Pre-Revolutionary War ==
Martin Shultz was born in the Manchester Township, then found in records of both Lancaster and York County, in Colonial Pennsylvania on April 3, 1740. His father, Velten (Valentine), was a German immigrant that had come to the America's in 1731. His mother, Maria Eva Stocker, was a Swiss immigrant that had arrived in the America's in 1733.

As a young man, Martin was apprenticed in the skill of shoemaking due to a lack thereof in the Lancaster County area. He and his wife Julianna Stentz moved into the York County region after getting married at Christ Lutheran Church on July 28, 1761. The following month (August) in 1761, Martin volunteered to apprentice a 16 year old named Philip Bayer in shoemaking, and in 1763 transferred this apprenticeship to another local shoemaker, Daniel Peterman.

Evidently, Martin sought the release of this obligation due to his desire to move south into the Carolina colonies. Sometime in 1764, he and his family moved to Mecklenburg County, North Carolina, settling in the area of Killian's Creek and Leeper's Creek. From March 1765 to December 1772, Martin was an active member of the local legislature, taking part as a witness to several land grants and deed signings.

Between August 1762 and 1775, Martin and his wife Julianna had 6 children: Valentine K., David Alexander Preston, John Rudicile, Jacob, Martin "S.E.", and Julia Ann.

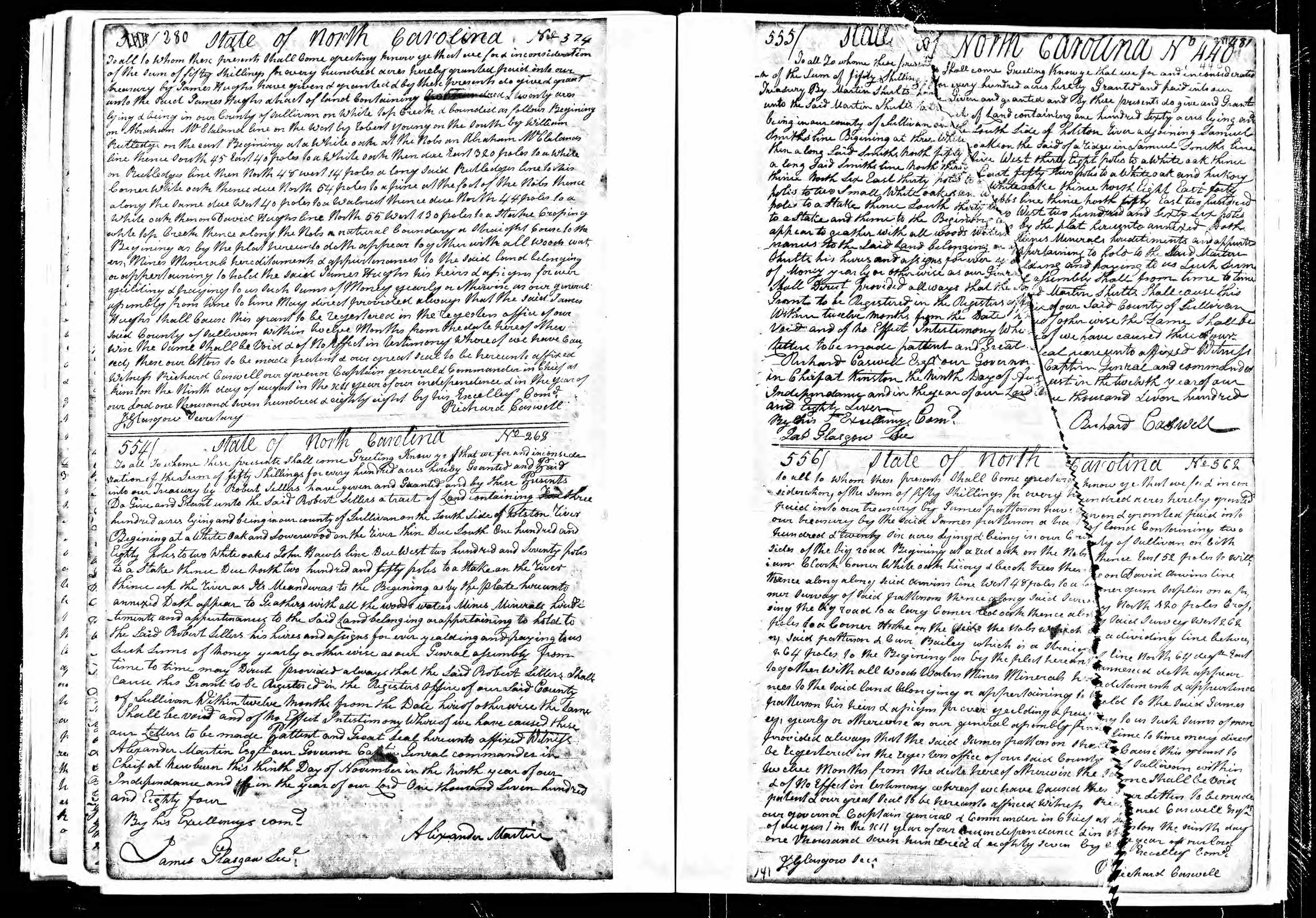
North Carolina land registry detailing Martin Shultz's purchasing 160 acres of land; dated August 9, 1787.

On 24 December 1772, Martin purchased 300 acres of land from Henry Dellinger for 10 pounds, located at the head waters of Leeper's Creek, or current day Lincoln County, NC. They would live on this land until June 21, 1777, when they sold the 300 acres for 70 pounds. On the deed of the sale, both he and his wife signed in the old German script, but notably, Martin signed "Doctor Martin Shultz" indicating that sometime while living in Mecklenburg he received training as a medical doctor.

Between the Fall of 1777 and Winter of 1778, Martin and his family moved to Washington County, NC (now Sullivan County, TN) on the South side of the Holston River. In November 1779, Martin purchased 200 acres of land there in Washington County. He was listed as owning 350 total acres in the county tax lists for 1779.

== Revolutionary War Service ==
Martin was recruited to service in August 1780. He fought in the favor of the Patriots upon the invasion of Major Patrick Ferguson of the British Army into the westernmost flank of General Charles Cornwallis' line of advance. The militia that was collected from the Appalachian Mountains became known as the "Overmountain Men" due to their coming across the mountains to engage the redcoats.

Among their ranks, Martin is recorded as serving as the only surgeon (doctor) specifically in Colonel John Sevier's Company. It was in this Company that Martin likely met Frederick Emert. While it is very likely that Shultz served as doctor for the entirety of the Overmountain Men's assembly, Martin is known to have certainly been present when the unit engaged the British Army at the Battle of King's Mountain. The battle lasted a little more than an hour, and was a clear victory for the Patriots. King's Mountain served as one of the most shocking and decisive British defeats in the war.

- British General Sir Henry Clinton would later comment that the American victory at King's Mountain "so encouraged the spirit of rebellion in the Carolinas that it could never afterward be humbled."
- "That glorious victory was the joyful annunciation of that turn in the tide of success which terminated the Revolutionary War." -Thomas Jefferson about the Battle of King's Mountain.

== Post-Revolutionary War and Death ==
In 1785, Governor John Sevier signed the Treaty of Dumplin Creek, which "Ceded the territory south of the French Broad and Holston Rivers and west of the Big Pigeon River and east of the ridge dividing Little River from the Tennessee River to the State of Franklin." Upon signing this treaty, Sevier began conscripting trusted men to settle the new territory. Two of these men that Sevier trusted were Martin Shultz and Frederick Emert, who had both served with Sevier in the Revolutionary War.

Martin and his family moved into what would become known as Emert's Cove, in current day Pittman Center, Sevier County, Tennessee. He died there in November 1787. His grave is unmarked.
