= Schultheiss (surname) =

Schultheiss or Schultheiß is a surname of German origin. Notable people with the surname include:

- Adrian Schultheiss (born 1988), Swedish figure skater
- Carl Max Schultheiss (1885–1961), German-American graphic designer
- Christina Schultheiß (1918–2016), German civil engineer, best known for her involvement in the Protestant church
- Fredy Schultheiss (1926–2006), Swiss rower
- Hans Schultheiss (1921–2013), Swiss rower
- Herman J. Schulteis (1818–1889), Wisconsin politician
- Joachim Ludwig Schultheiss von Unfriedt (1678–1753), German architect
- Louis A. Schultheiss (1925–2014), American academic
- Matthias Schultheiss (born 1946), German graphic novel artist
- Walter Schultheiß (1924–2025), German actor, author and painter
