= Johann Balthasar Lauterbach =

German architect (1663–1694)

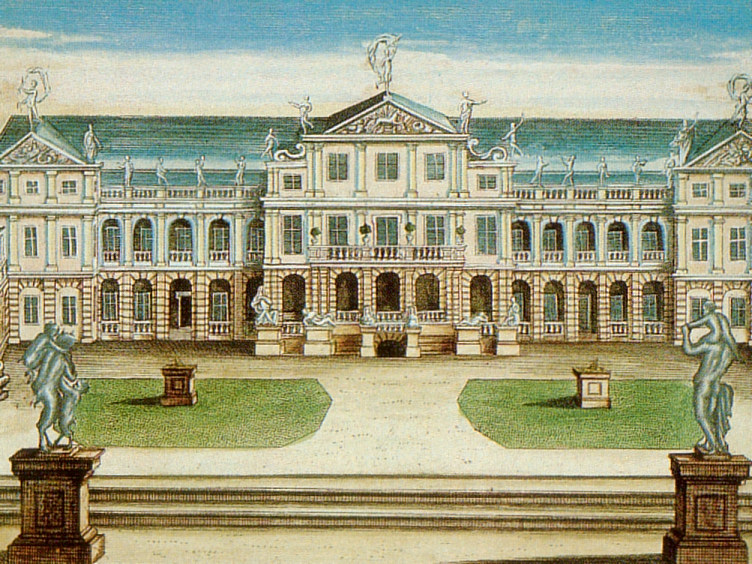
Schloss Salzdahlum

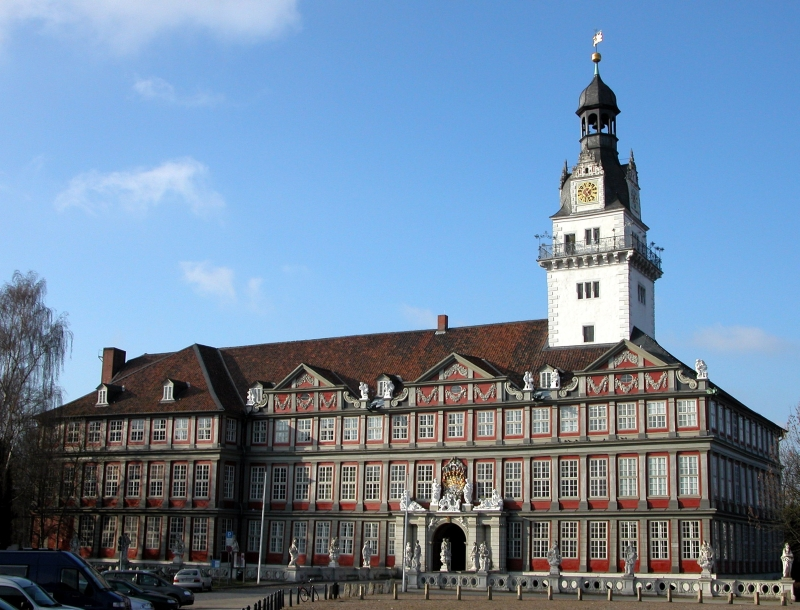
Schloss Wolfenbüttel

Johann Balthasar Lauterbach (20 May 1663, Ulm - 20 April 1694, Wolfenbüttel) was a German mathematician, architect and master builder at the Court in Braunschweig, from 1688 until his death.

== Life and work ==
His father, Johann (1640–1719), was a shoemaker and guild master. His half-brother, from his father's second marriage, was the cartographer, Johann Christoph Lauterbach. After grammar school, he studied theology at the University of Tübingen, then studied mathematics at the University of Jena.

In 1687, Anthony Ulrich, Duke of Brunswick-Wolfenbüttel, assigned him to the Rudolph-Antoniana, a Ritterakademie in Wolfenbüttel, where he taught mathematics and architecture. Two years later, he was appointed Master Builder, in charge of a new princely Building Authority, assisted by Hermann Korb. In 1692, he became the Fortress Engineer and proceeded to expand the city's fortifications.

He died in 1694, following a long illness, aged only thirty. Korb succeeded him as Master Builder and Leonhard Christoph Sturm took his place at the Ritterakademie.

His largest project was the initial draft for the Schloss Salzdahlum. Although monumental in appearance, much of it was actually made of timber and wood panels. During the Napoleonic Wars, it fell into neglect and was demolished in 1813. From 1688 to 1692, he worked on a major expansion of the Schloss Wolfenbüttel. He also created the original designs for the Opernhaus am Hagenmarkt, Schloss Destedt, and the first church St. Trinitatis, Wolfenbüttel.

His treatise, Compendium Architecturae Civilis Harmonicae Antiquae et Novae, was published posthumously in Amsterdam in 1698.

== Sources ==
- Elmar Arnhold: "Lauterbach, Johann Balthasar, Prof." In: Horst-Rüdiger Jarck, Dieter Lent (Eds.): Braunschweigisches Biographisches Lexikon – 8. bis 18. Jahrhundert. Appelhans Verlag, Braunschweig 2006, ISBN 3-937664-46-7, pg.430.
- Hans-Henning Grote: Johann Balthasar Lauterbach (1663–1694), Professor für Mathematik, Landbaumeister und Ingenieur am Wolfenbütteler Fürstenhof. Wolfenbüttel 1995, ISBN 3-928009-08-7.
- Museum im Schloss Wolfenbüttel und Fachgebiet Baugeschichte TU Braunschweig, Hermann Korb (1656–1735) und seine Zeit – Barockes Bauen im Fürstentum Braunschweig-Wolfenbüttel. Braunschweig 2006, ISBN 3-937664-51-3.
- Hans Reuther (1982). "Lauterbach, Johann Balthasar". Neue Deutsche Biographie (in German). Vol. 13. Berlin: Duncker & Humblot. pp. 734–735. (full text online).
