= Rudolph-Antoniana =

Coordinates: 52°9′43″N 10°31′49″E

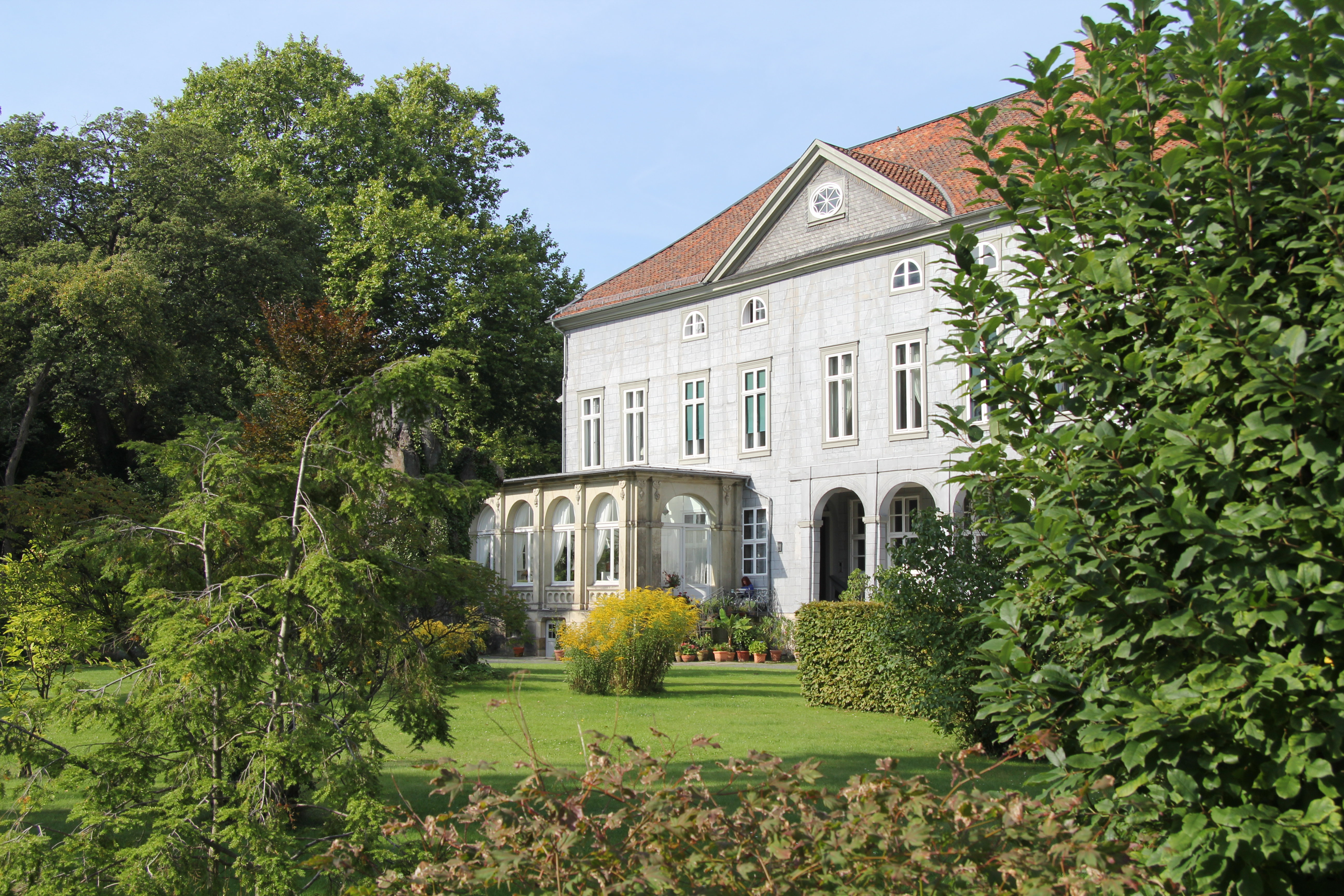
The 'Kleine Schloss', home of the Ritterakademie in Wolfenbüttel

The Akademie Rudolph-Antoniana was an early modern Ritterakademie sited in Wolfenbüttel in what was then the Duchy of Brunswick-Lüneburg in Germany. It was founded on 18 July 1687 by Rudolph Augustus and Anthony Ulrich, brothers and co-dukes of the Duchy. It was housed in the Kleines Schloss in Wolfenbüttel (at what is now Schloßplatz Nr. 14), right next to the Schloss Wolfenbüttel and its Herzog August Library, meaning students could borrow books from there but also get to know court-life, such as operas, plays and hunting in the Harz and Elm.

Over the course of its twenty-eight-year existence it had 331 pupils, all lords, who had their coats of arms inscribed in its register. These included Peter Friedrich Arpe, Karl Friedrich Hieronymus Freiherr von Münchhausen (basis for the character Baron Münchhausen) and Anton Wilhelm Amo (pupil 1717–1721; the first known German philosopher and legal scholar of African origin). They came not only from the Duchy of Brunswick-Lüneburg itself, but from other German states and even from other countries, with the latter coming to the academy to learn German.

Pupils were also taught theology, law, history, mathematics, mechanics, Latin, Italian, French, riding, shooting, fencing and dancing. Optional subjects included English and Spanish. Gottfried Wilhelm Leibniz praised its professors' high qualifications. They included the mathematicians and architects Johann Balthasar Lauterbach (1663−1694) and Leonhard Christoph Sturm (1669−1719; taught 1694–1702). The academy finally closed in 1715.

== Bibliography ==
- (in German) Alfred Kuhlenkamp: Die Ritterakademie Rudolf-Antoniana in Wolfenbüttel 1687–1715 (= Beiträge zur Geschichte der Carolo-Wilhelmina. Band 3). Braunschweigischer Hochschulbund, Braunschweig 1975.
- (in German) Joseph König: Beiträge zur Geschichte der Stadt Wolfenbüttel. Aus Anlaß der 400jährigen Wiederkehr der Verleihung von Marktrecht und Wappen im Auftrage der Stadt Wolfenbüttel. Selbstverlag der Stadt, Wolfenbüttel 1970.
