= 1719 in architecture =

The year 1719 in architecture involved some significant architectural events and new buildings.

== Buildings and structures ==
=== Buildings completed ===
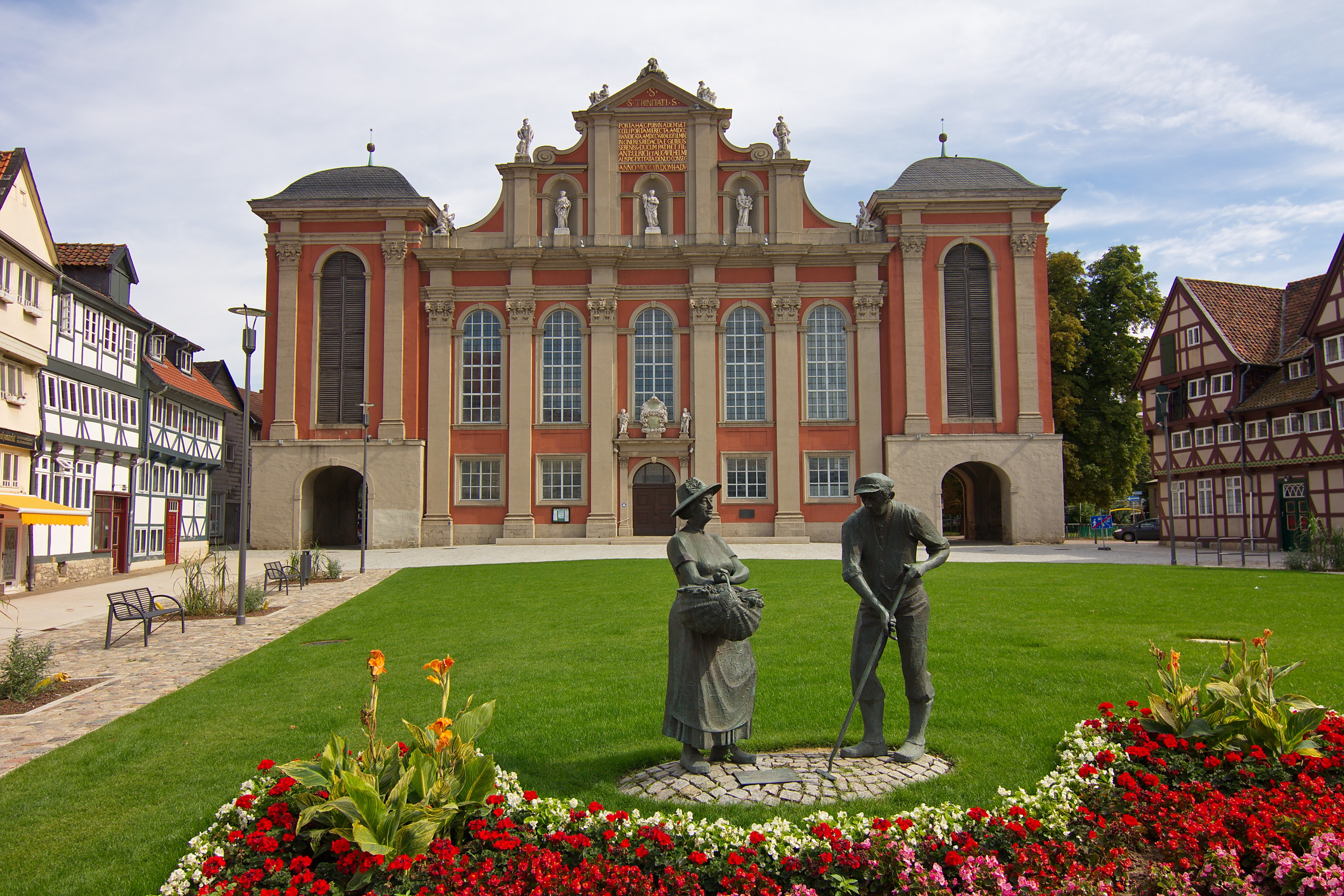
St. Trinitatis, Wolfenbüttel

- The Catholic parish church of St. John the Baptist, Stamsried, Bavaria, Germany.
- St. Trinitatis, Wolfenbüttel, Lower Saxony, Germany, designed by Hermann Korb.
- San Michele Arcangelo, Anacapri, Italy.
- St Mary's Church, Tarleton, England.
- St. Werburgh's Church, Dublin (Church of Ireland), designed by Colonel Thomas Burgh, Surveyor General of Ireland.
- The house of William Trent, Trenton, New Jersey.

== Births ==
- date unknown – Dmitry Ukhtomsky, chief architect of Moscow (died 1774)

== Deaths ==
- March 10 – Jean-Baptiste Alexandre Le Blond, French architect and garden designer who became the chief architect of Saint Petersburg (born 1679)
- November 22 – William Talman, English architect and landscape designer (born 1650)
