= Kleines Schloss (Wolfenbüttel) =

Coordinates: 52°9′43″N 10°31′49″E

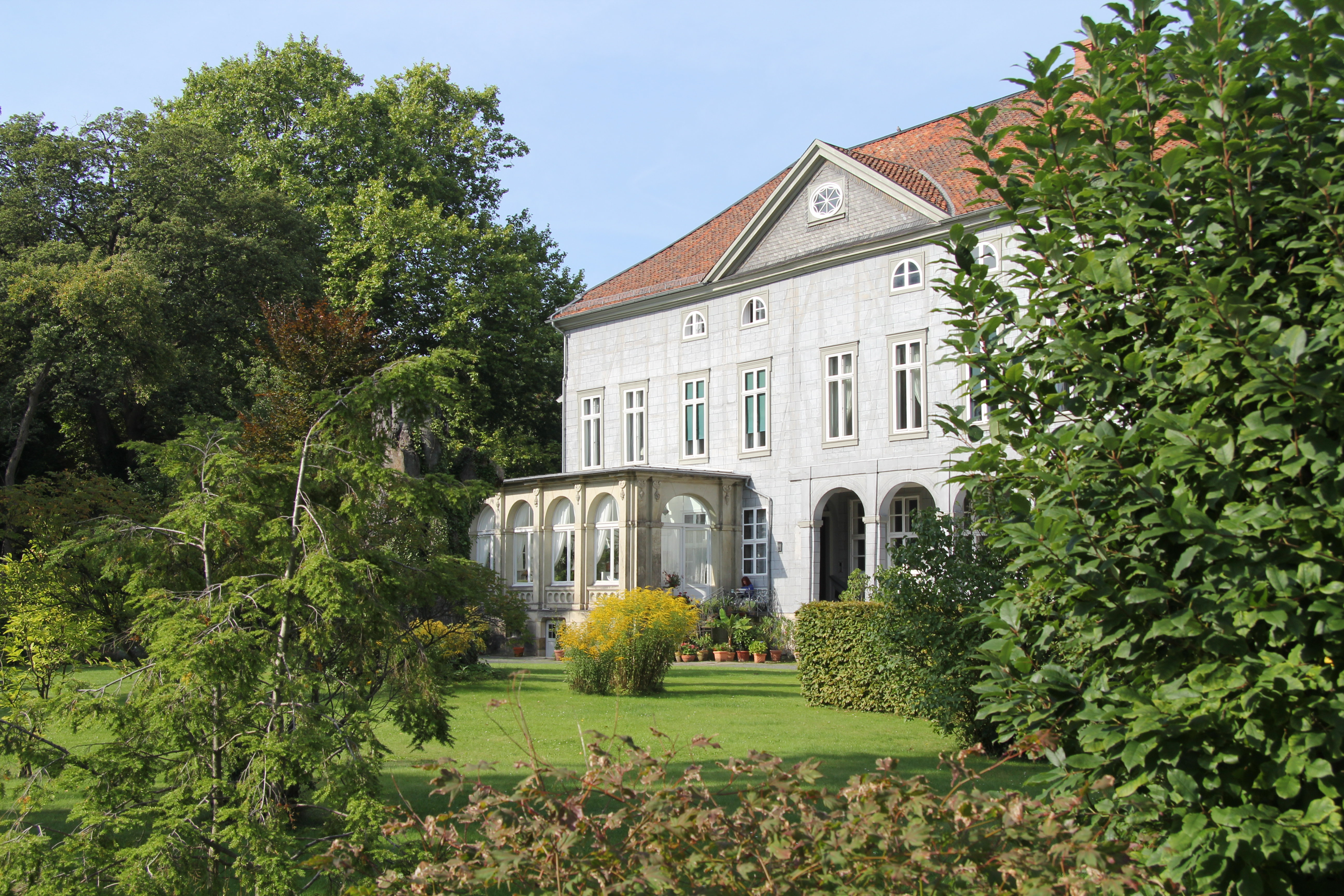
The Kleines Schloss in 2011

The Kleine Schloss (Little Castle) in Wolfenbüttel is a Baroque building in the town of Wolfenbüttel in Lower Saxony. It is sited next to the Schloss Wolfenbüttel on what is now the Schlossplatz. It was first built in 1643 but has been frequently extended, demolished and rebuilt.

== History ==
In the 17th century the Kleine Schloss was principally the residence of the hereditary princes of Brunswick-Lüneburg. From 1687 to 1712 it housed the Rudolph-Antoniana Ritterakademie for noble families. The building was also known as the Bevernsches Schloss, since Ferdinand Albert II, Duke of Brunswick-Wolfenbüttel used it as a residence from 1723 to 1735; his children grew up there. The Kleine Schloss's small ballroom was rebuilt in the Empire Style and on 15 June 1733 hosted the re-celebration of the double wedding of two of these children: Prince Charles to princess Philippine Charlotte of Prussia and Elisabeth Christine to the future Frederick II of Prussia.

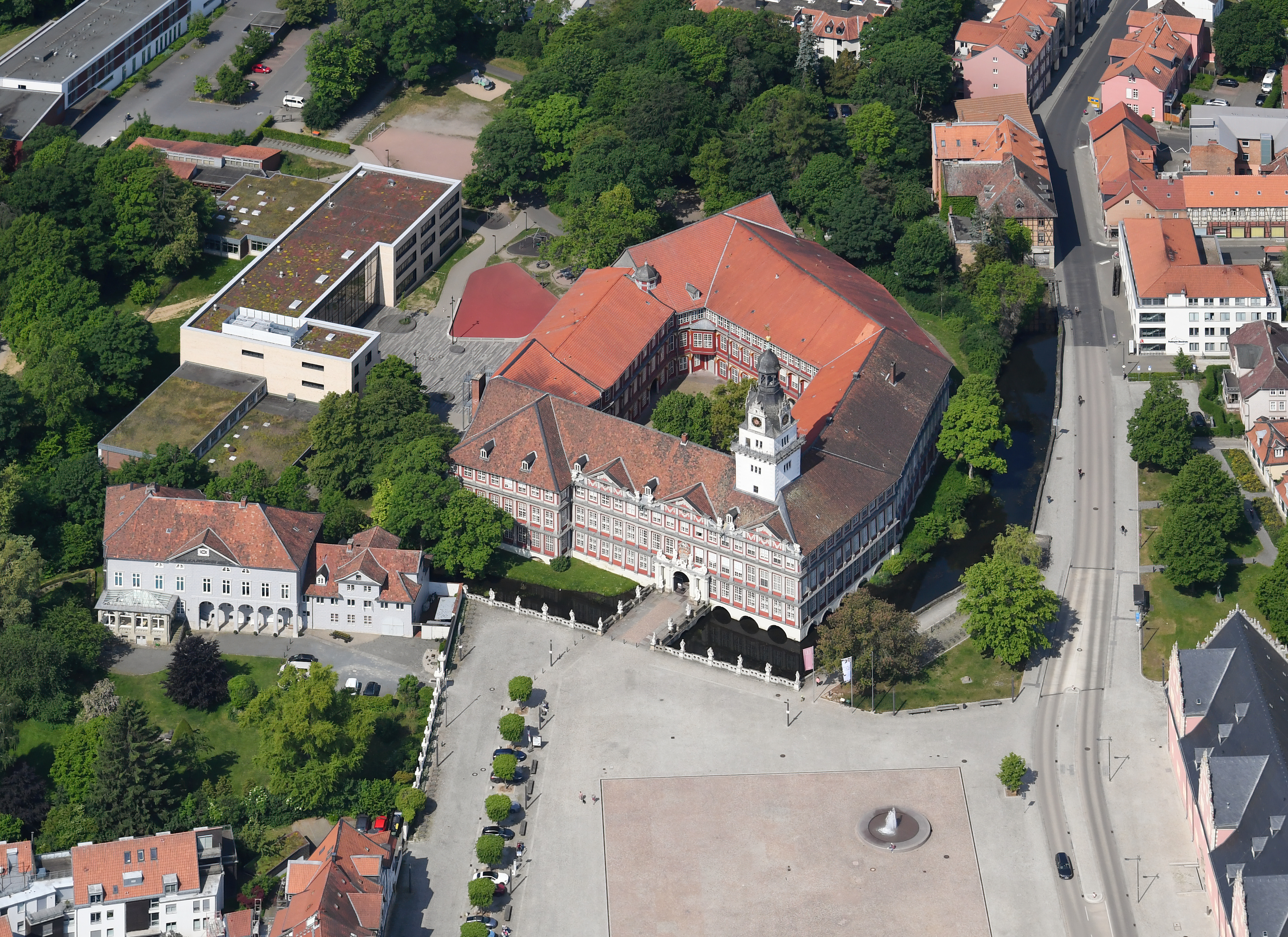
The Schloss Wolfenbüttel (right), with the remains of the Kleines Schloss (left of center)

The ducal court later moved to Brunswick and in 1791 the Kleine Schloss was sold to Droste Raeber von Rodenberg, one of the duchy's ministers. It has been a private house ever since. In 1830 the Unger family acquired the building and completely redesigned it, demolishing almost all of the building and putting a new facade on the only part of the earlier building they retained, which was the half-timbered west wing built in 1730, with its two stories and mezzanine. This gave the Schloss its present appearance. It was bought in 1869 by the banker Gustav Seeliger, head of the Bankhaus C. L. Seeliger, who added a park in the English style; a ginkgo and a Juglans nigra planted for that garden still survive there.
