= Peter Friedrich Arpe =

German lawyer, historian and legal writer

- Born: 5 October 1682; Kiel, Holy Roman Empire
- Died: 4 November 1740 (aged 58); Schwerin, Kingdom of Prussia, Holy Roman Empire
- Occupations: Legal writer Art collector Historian; Lawyer

Peter Friedrich Arpe (10 May 1682, Kiel - 4 November 1740, Schwerin) was a German lawyer, historian and legal writer. He was also the founder of a huge collection of objects and manuscripts on the history of Schleswig-Holstein, though his collection also included banned theological works. He also wrote and collected under the Latinised form of his name, Petrus Fridericus Arpius.

== Life ==
He was the son of a senator, who later became mayor. After going to school in Lüneburg, from 1699 he studied jurisprudence in Kiel. After some time in Copenhagen, he accompanied a young Danish count to the Rudolph-Antoniana academy in Wolfenbüttel. Between 1712 and 1716 he lived in Holland, before returning to Kiel. In 1721 he was made professor of public and national law. He became friends and collaborators with his colleagues Franz Ernst Vogt and Johann Heinrich Heubel. However, they competed and ended up in a judicial dispute due to Stephan Christoph von Harpprecht. Arpe thus fell into discredit at court and in 1724 he was finally dismissed. First he moved to Hamburg and then from 1729 became a Legationsrat in Brunswick-Wolfenbüttl. After the death of Augustus William, Duke of Brunswick-Bevern, he was dismissed again in 1731. In 1733 he found a job as a Justizrat (judicial counsel) in the government chancellery in Schwerin.

He catalogued his own writings in his "Feriae aestivales, sive scriptorum suorum historia" (1726). Initially only handwritten, anonymous and available in the library of Kiel University as "Das verwirrte Cimbrien, in der merkwürdigen Lebensbeschreibung Herr Henning Friedrich Grafen von Bassewitz...", his masterwork was published in 1774 as "Geschichte des Herzoglich Schleswig-Holstein-Gottorfischen Hofes und dessen vornehmster Staatsbedienten". It is notable as the only comprehensive contemporary source on the history of Schleswig-Holstein and its connections to Russia at the time of Charles Frederick, Duke of Holstein-Gottorp. Due to Arpe's dismissal, he held a great personal enmity against the then-president of the privy council at Gottorf, Henning Friedrich, count von Bassewitz, and thus the work contains several polemics against him.

== Selected works ==
- Geschichte des herzoglich Schleswig-Holstein-Gottorfischen Hofes und dessen vornehmsten Staats-Bedienten, unter der Regierung Herzog Friedrichs IV. und dessen Sohnes Herzog Carl Friedrichs, mit geheimen Anecdoten zur Erläuterung der Schleswig-Holsteinischen Historie besonders als der nordischen Begebenheiten überhaupt, Frankfurth u.a., 1774
- Geschichte der Talismannischen Kunst, Gotha, 1792 Digitalisat in OPACplus der Bayerischen Staatsbibliothek
- Theatrum fati, Roterodamum, 1712 Digitalisat in OPACplus der Bayerischen Staatsbibliothek
- Apologia pro Jul. Caes. Vanino Neapolitano, Philalethes, 1712
- Themis Cimbrica, Hamburg, 1737
- De prodigiosis naturae et artis operibus Talismanes et Amuleta dictis liber sing., Hamburg, 1717 Digitalisat in OPACplus der Bayerischen Staatsbibliothek
- Laicus Veritatis Vindex Sive De Iure Laicorum Praecipue Germanorum In Promovendo Religionis Negotio Commentarius, Kiliae Holsatorum,1717 Digitalisat in OPACplus der Bayerischen Staatsbibliothek
- Feriae Aestivales. Sive Scriptorum Suorum Historia Liber Singularis, Hamburgi, Kisnerus, 1726 Digitalisat in OPACplus der Bayerischen Staatsbibliothek
- Disputatio iuridica de feriis et dilationibus, Hrsg.:Martini, Nicolaus, Kilonium, 1702 Digitalisat in OPACplus der Bayerischen Staatsbibliothek

== Bibliography ==
- Emil Julius Hugo Steffenhagen (1875). "Arpe, Peter Friedrich" . Allgemeine Deutsche Biographie (in German). Vol. 1. Leipzig: Duncker & Humblot. pp. 608–609.
