= Gärtnermuseum Wolfenbüttel =

Coordinates: 52°10′33″N 10°32′22″E

The Gärtnermuseum Wolfenbüttel (Gardener’s Museum Wolfenbüttel) is a local history museum located in Wolfenbüttel, Northern Germany. It is dedicated to documenting the history and cultural heritage of gardeners in the region, in a city, which besides being called “Lessingstadt” is also known as “Gartenstadt Wolfenbüttel”. The museum presents exhibitions on traditional horticulture, tools, and the social history of gardening families. It preserves archival materials and objects related to the gardening profession in Wolfenbüttel. The institution contributes to the regional remembrance of horticultural traditions in Lower Saxony. The Gardeners’ Museum on Neuer Weg looks back on a 300-year tradition. Since 2022, it has featured a new, modern exhibition.

== See also ==
- Gardening
