= Collegium illustre =

Ducal court school

Coordinates: 48.5212126°N 9.054551°E

The Collegium illustre in Tübingen was a ducal Court School from 1559 onwards, an academy between 1594 and 1596, and a knight academy for young aristocrats in the Duchy of Württemberg between 1596 and 1688. After its dissolution in 1817 the building of Collegium illustre became the home of the newly founded Wilhelmsstift, a residence hall for Roman Catholic theology students.

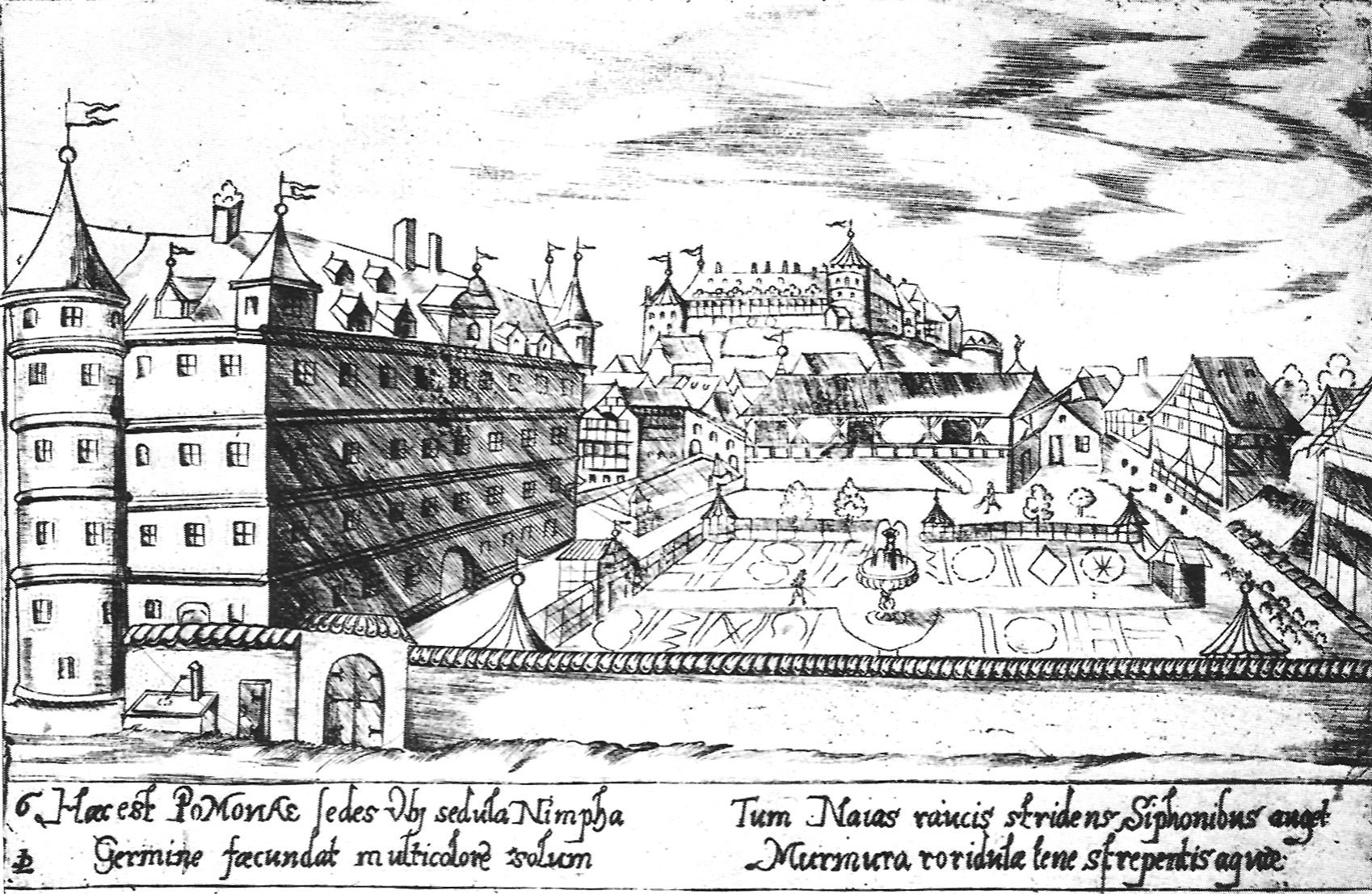
The Collegium illustre – taken from „Illustrissimi Wirtembergici Ducalis Novii Colegii … delineatio“ (around 1607; etching by Ludwig Ditzinger adapted from a drawing by Johann Christoph Neyffer)

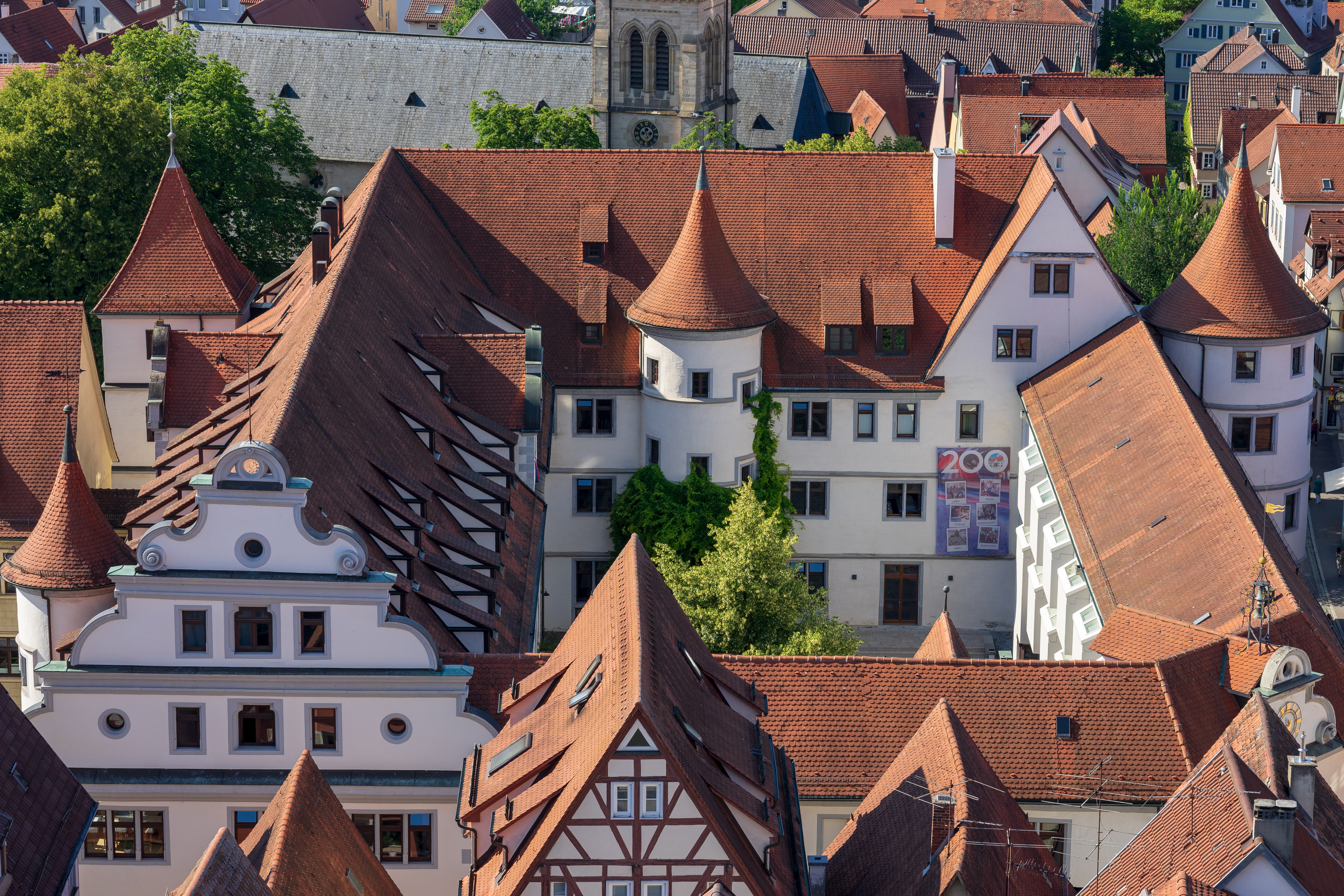
View of today's Wilhelmsstift, former Collegium illustre

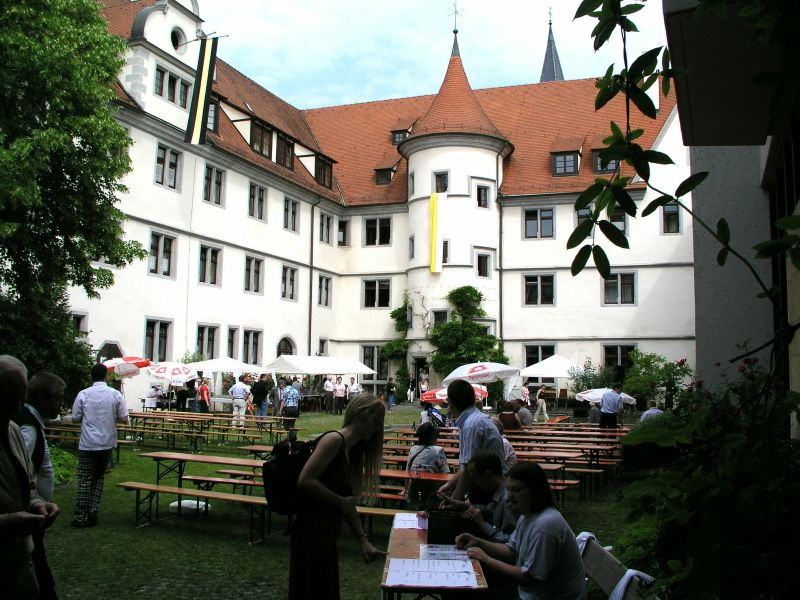
Inner courtyard of today's Wilhelmsstift. The facade — excepting the eastern wing — dates back to Collegium illustre.

== History ==
=== Previous history ===
At the place of former Collegium illustre and today's Wilhelmsstift a Franciscan monastery was located since 1272. The monastery also housed a house of studies. In the 15th century the house of studies became important because of his academic lectors. After the dissolution of the monastery in 1535 the building partly burned down in 1540.

=== Court School ===
In the year 1559 Christoph, Duke of Württemberg (1515–1568) had established a court school in the buildings that survived the fire of 1540. The court school was the first knight academy in the German-speaking part of Europe. Its purpose was to prepare young aristocrats for civil service.

=== Academy ===
Duke Christoph, who was a deeply religious Lutheran, wanted to expand the court school to an academy. Therefore, he instructed his court architect Georg Beer to erect a four-wing complex in the style of late renaissance between 1588–1592. The portal is at the corner of the streets Lange Gasse and Collegiumgasse. Above the portal, there is still the coat of arms of the Duchy of Württemberg from the year 1593. As Duke Christoph died in 1568, and his son Louis III, Duke of Württemberg died in 1593 childless, Frederick, Count of Mömpelgard - a branch of the House of Württemberg - became duke in 1593 and therefore opened the Collegium illustre on April 25, 1594. The first collegians were admitted on that day. Under the statutes of April 23, 1594 aristocrats, as well as bourgeois, could attend the academy.

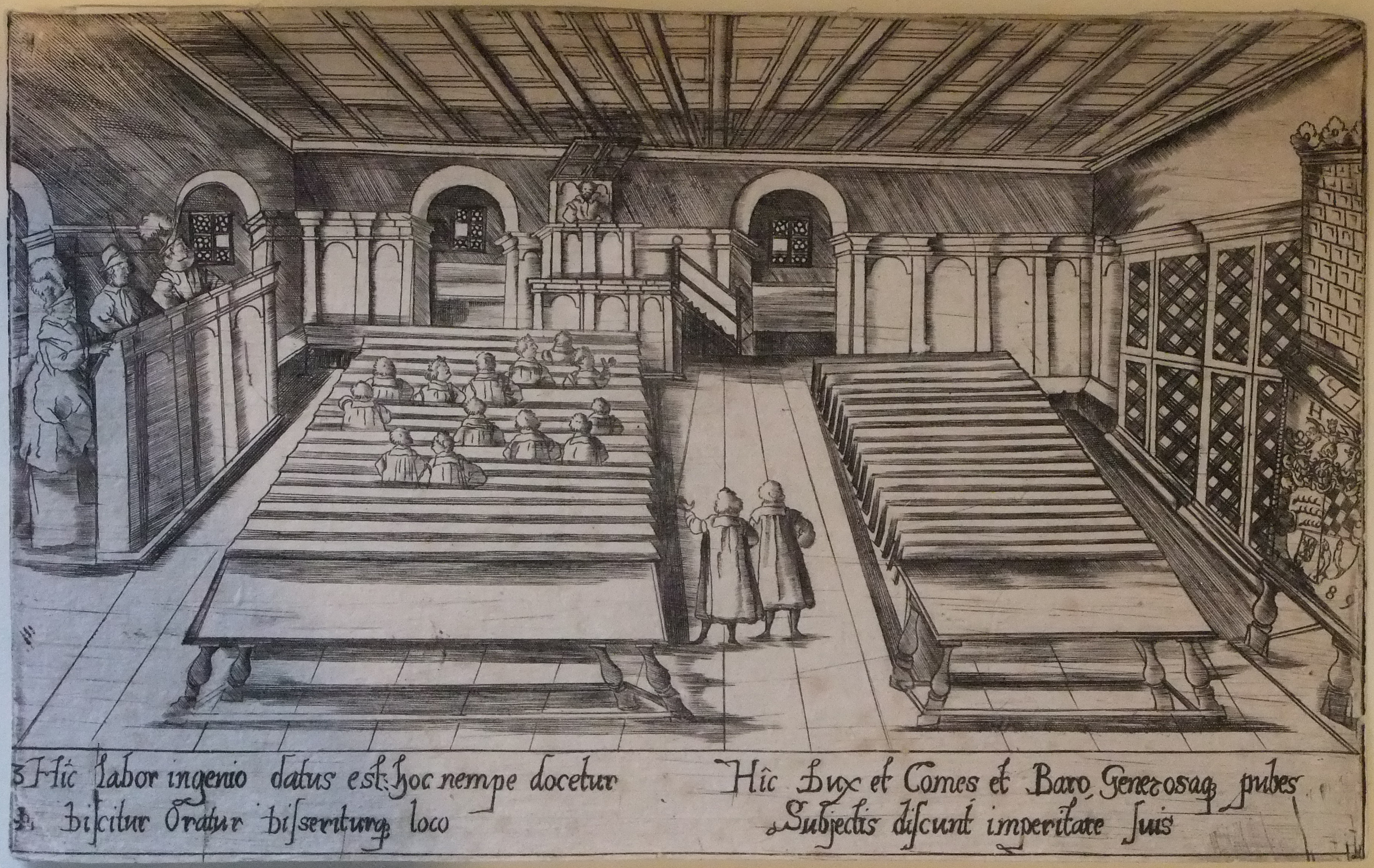
Lecture hall

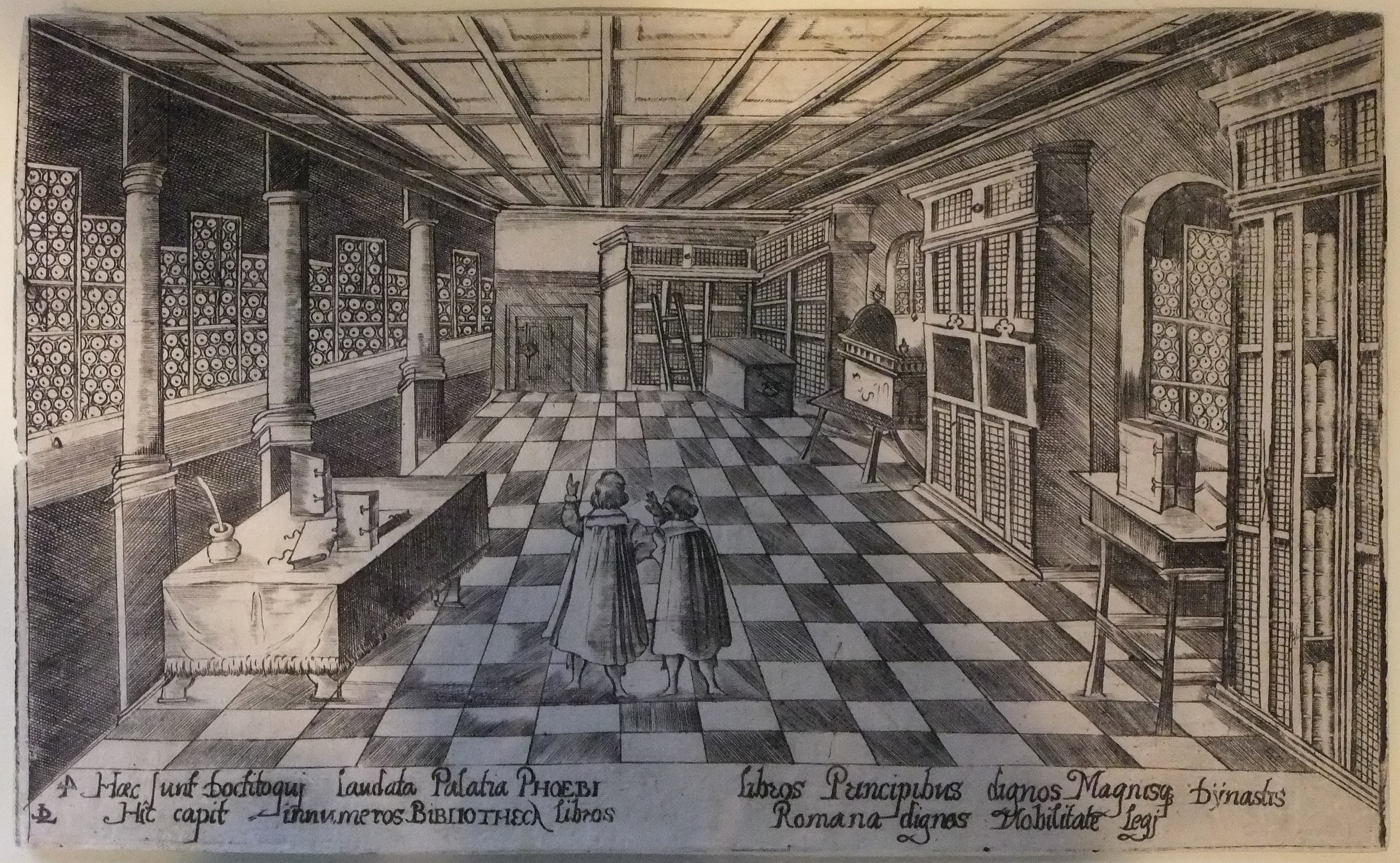
Library

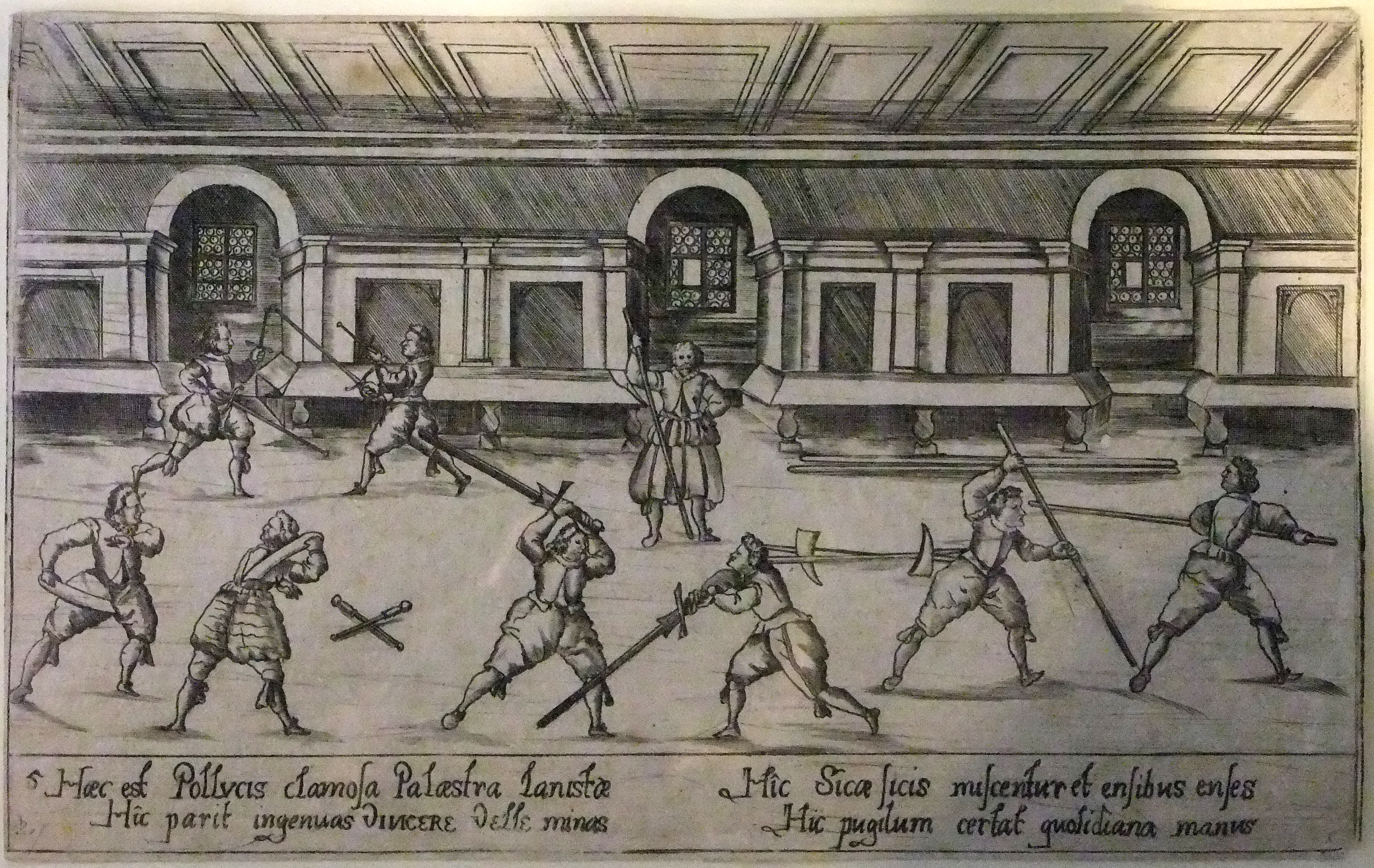
Training in fencing

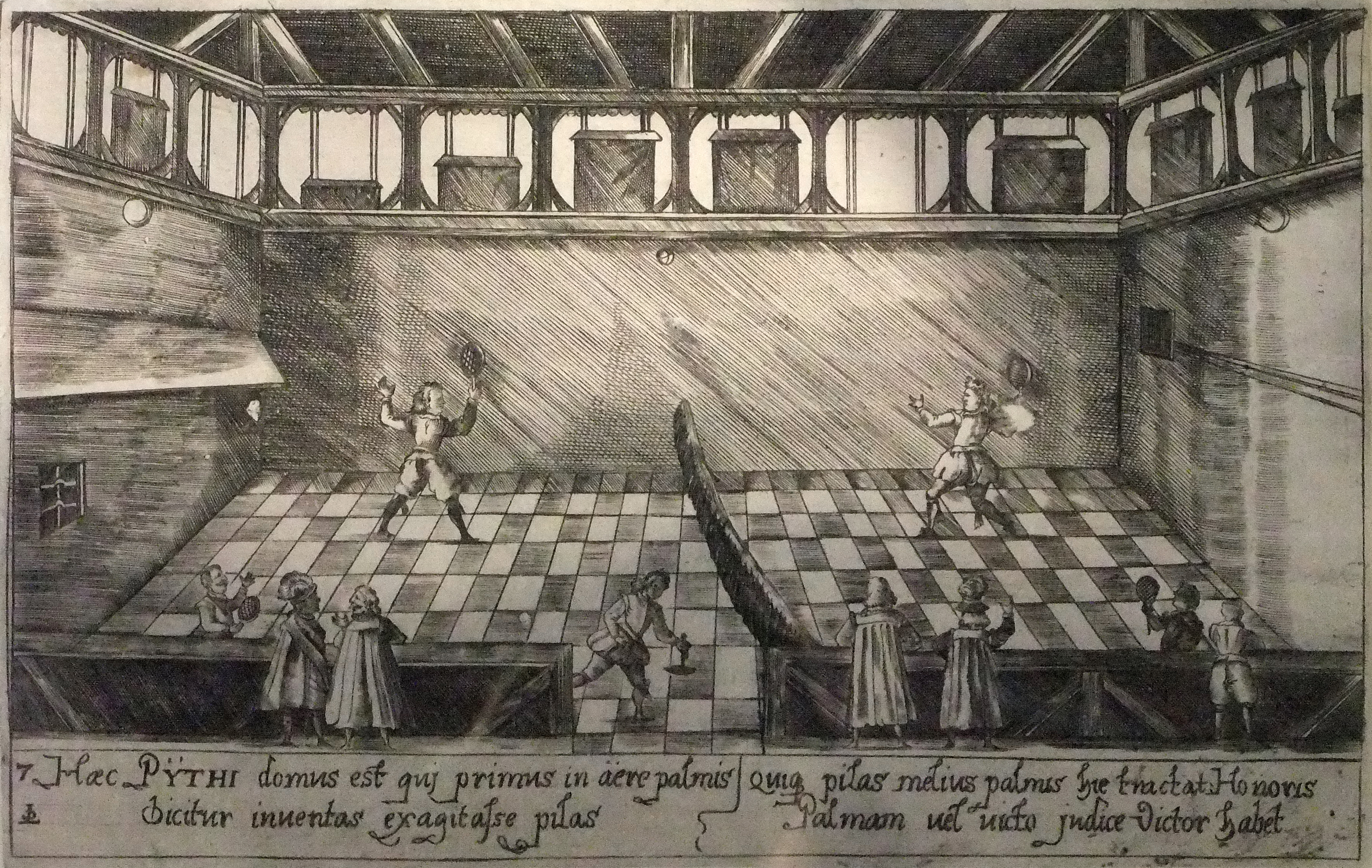
Jeu de paume court

Two years later - on April 23, 1596, Duke Frederick I. changed the statutes of the Academy. From then on, aristocrats from all across Europe were admitted to the Academy. In 1609 the statutes were changed again. Henceforth only aristocrats were allowed to attend the Academy and only Aristocrats from the Holy Roman Empire. Therefore, it became a knight academy.

In the year 1601 it was completely detached from the university and existed from then on as a legal, administrative and exempt corporation within the town, which served only for the education of young aristocrats. Instead of an academic director, the Academy was led by an aristocratic constable from that time on. At the Academy the young aristocrats were educated in horse-riding, equestrian vaulting, fencing, dancing according to the aristocratic education ideal. Besides the prospectus of the university the aristocrats were also educated in history, politics, law, Roman Law, Feudal Law, State Law, Sciences, modern languages, military technology and in the study of fortresses.

The arcades and the spacious gallery courtyard were used for various events. The training in the courtyard could be watched from the floors. In the south western part of the building there was a Jeu de paume court, where the aristocrats could play. As with Tennis a net was stretched across the room. At one side the net joined a gallery, which had a pent roof that was part of the court. From the gallery and the windows, spectator could watch the game.

The Knight Academy had been the preferred educational institution for Protestant aristocrats from all across Europe, even Scandinavia, Poland, Hungary and the Habsburg monarchy. This changed in the course of the Thirty Years' War. In 1629, the Academy had to be closed temporarily, because the Catholic League occupied the Duchy and emperor Ferdinand II issued the Edict of Restitution. Throughout the Counter-Reformation Jesuits came into town. There were attempts to convert the Knights Academy into a Jesuit College. Though the Jesuits moved to Rottenburg in 1649.

=== Final years ===
In 1648, after the end of Thirty Years' War Eberhard III, Duke of Württemberg sent his oldest son John Frederick to the Collegium in Tübingen. Other sons of high nobility were admitted as well. The Collegium illustre was officially reopened in 1653, as professors were appointed. Though the Academy could never regain its prosperity. It could not obtain the glamour of other Academies.
