= Schloss Wolfenbüttel =

Castle in Wolfenbüttel, Lower Saxony

Coordinates: 52°9′45.80″N 10°31′47.55″E

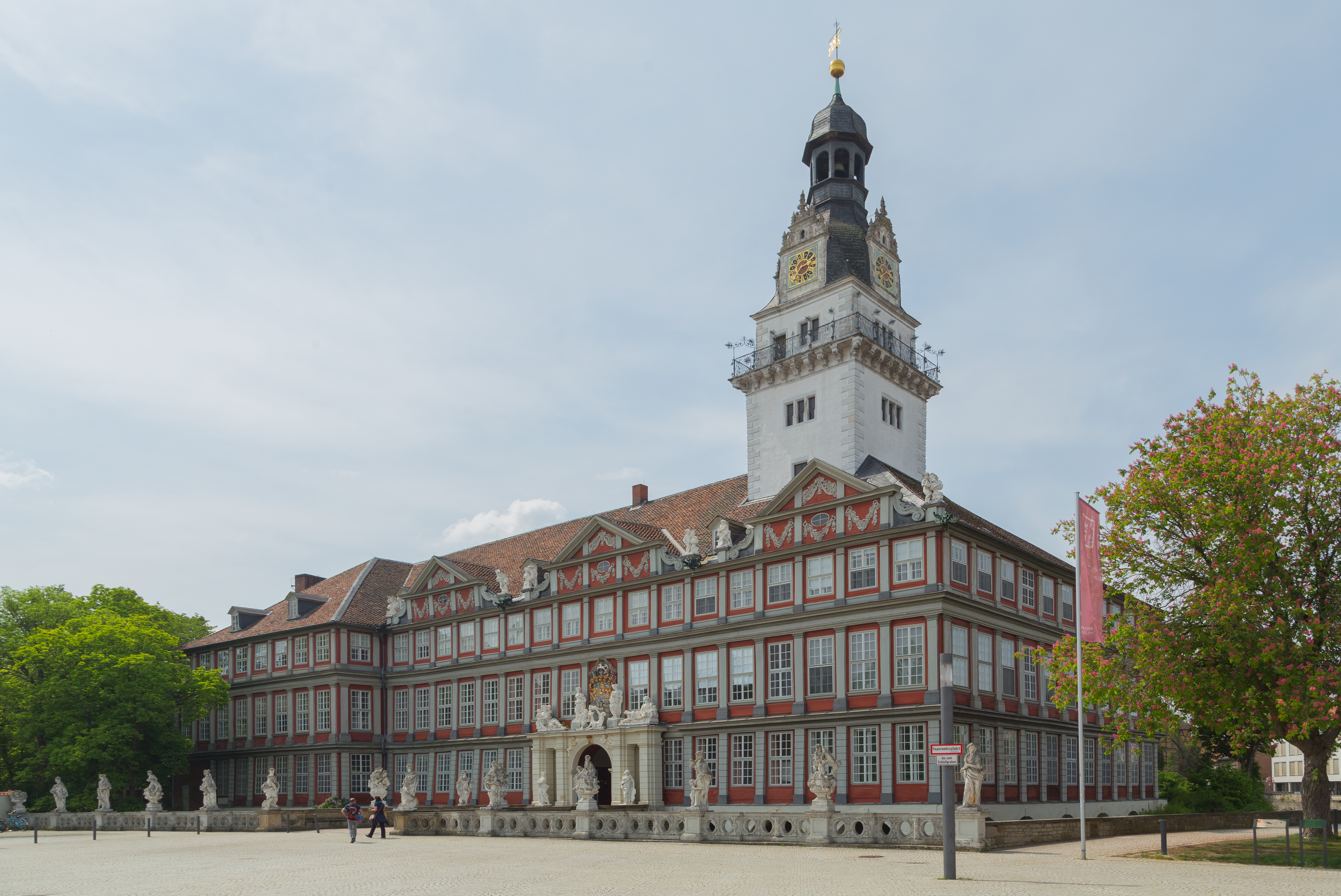
The Schloss

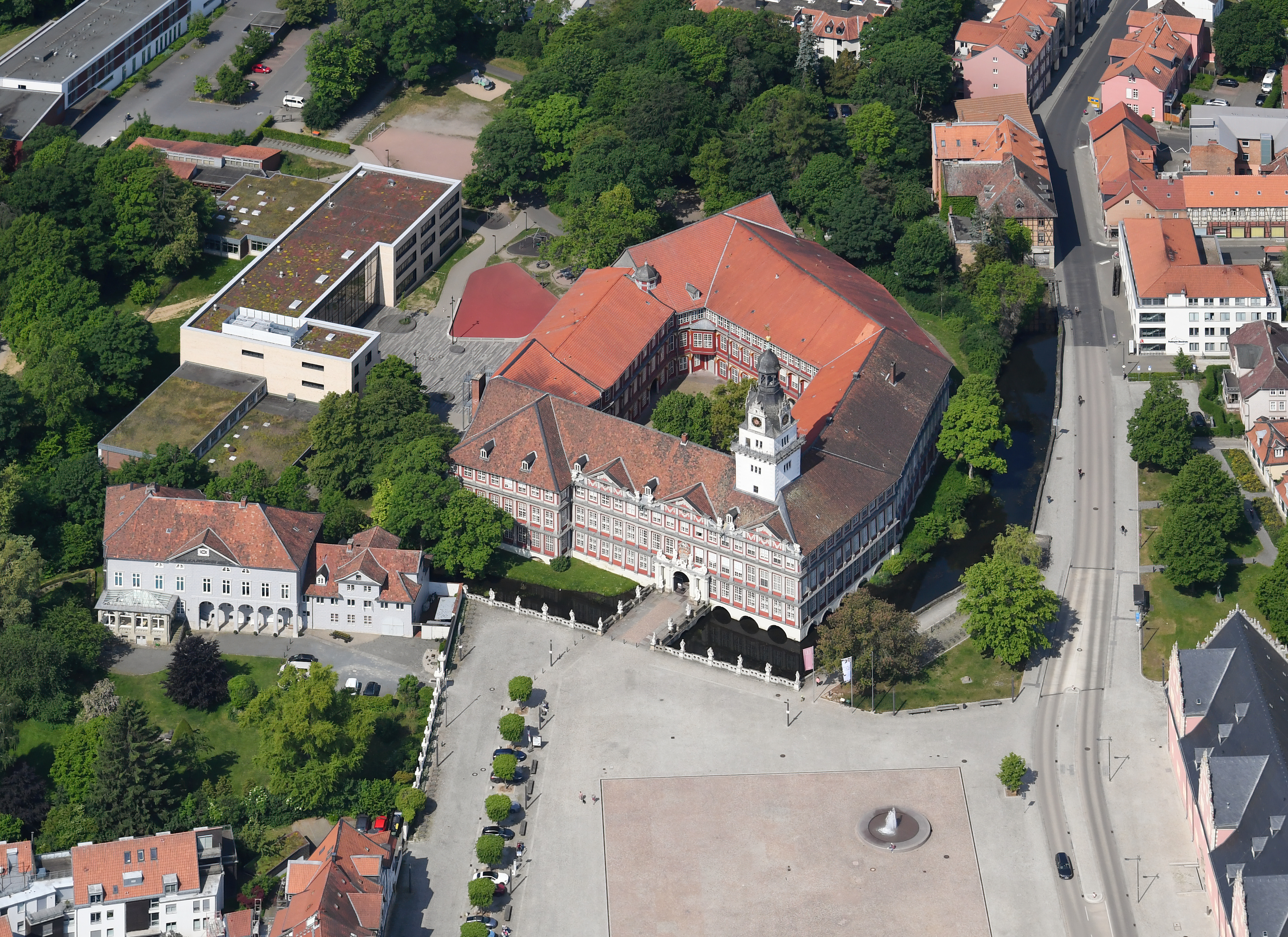
Aerial view of the Schloss

Schloss Wolfenbüttel is a castle in Wolfenbüttel, Lower Saxony, Germany. An extensive four-wing complex, it originated as a moated castle (Wasserburg). It is the second-largest surviving schloss in Lower Saxony and served as the main residence of the rulers of the Principality of Brunswick-Wolfenbüttel from 1432 to 1753. It now houses a gymnasium secondary school, the Federal Academy of Arts Education, and a museum with its historic rooms on display. Its immediate vicinity is home to several historically significant buildings including the Herzog August Bibliothek, the Lessinghaus, the Zeughaus, and the Kleines Schloss.

== History ==
=== Middle Ages ===
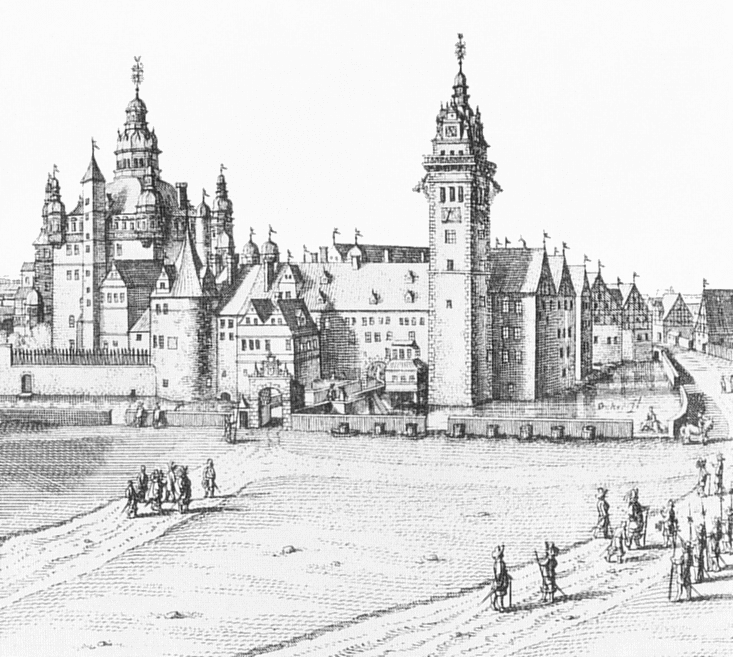
Matthäus Merian's copperplate engraving of the Schloss, 1654

It was first recorded in 1074 and was built as a fort on the river Oker by Widekind of Wolfenbüttel, recorded between 1089 and 1118. In the Oker marshes there was already a small settlement known as Wulferisbuttle, sited on a trade route between the Rhine and Elbe and the bishoprics of Halberstadt and Hildesheim, used by both merchants and pilgrim monks. In 1191, the castle was destroyed by duke Henry the Lion, the head of the House of Welf and brother-in-law of King Richard Lionheart. It was then rebuilt by the Wolfenbüttel lords. When Gunzelin of Wolfenbüttel refused to swear allegiance to Albert I of Brunswick in 1255, the latter destroyed the fort again, and he also chased Gunzelin's son Burchard of Asseburg from nearby Asseburg Castle, after a siege of three years ending in 1258. Wolfenbüttel Castle was rebuilt by Henry I of Brunswick-Grubenhagen in 1283. The current layout of the castle, its moat, and the lower levels and dungeon of the keep all date from Henry's time.

=== 16th and 17th centuries ===
In 1350 it became the Welfs' residence in Brunswick. It was captured and destroyed in 1542 by the Schmalkaldic League and rebuilding only began in 1553 under Duke Henry the Younger, who created a new residence and converted the old tower into a castle chapel. In 1575 courtyards were added with Italianate arcades.

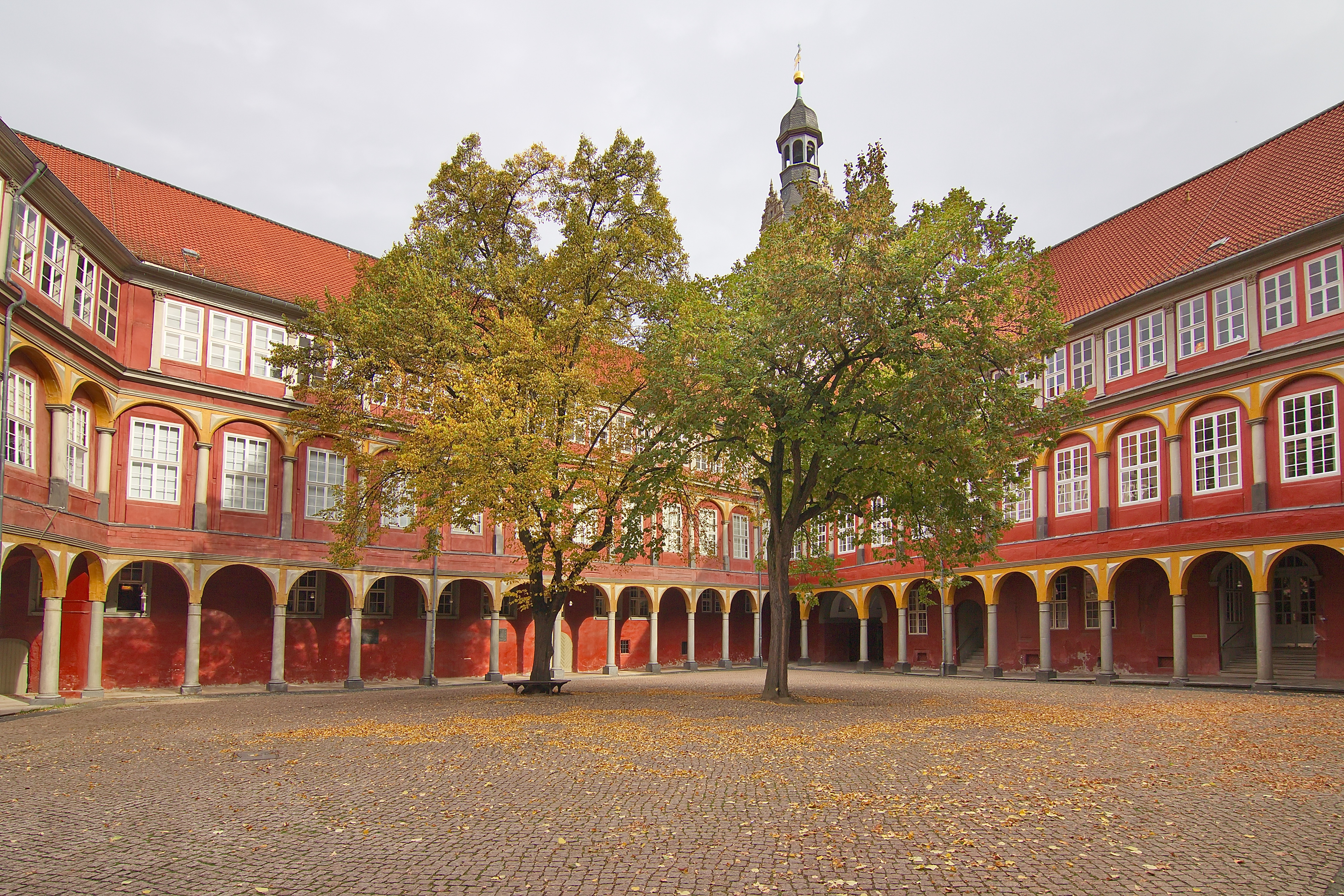
Inner courtyard

In 1595 the Protestant composer Michael Praetorius became private secretary to Henry Julius, Duke of Brunswick-Lüneburg, living in the castle. As court organist, he is also known to have played the castle organ, completed in 1596. Henry Julius also founded Germany's first indoor permanent theatre in the castle, with an English troupe of actors, making the town the birthplace of German theatre. The castle previously had more towers, some of whose foundations survive. The Hausmannsturm was built in the Renaissance style in 1613 by Paul Francke. The castle's tallest tower, it still stands today.

Duke Augustus moved to the castle in 1642 and between 1641 and 1643 also granted Conrad Buno a room there; Buno created several copperplate images of the castle. It was damaged during the Thirty Years' War. Between 1690 and 1697 the castle underwent a major renovation during which its great halls were converted into residential chambers for the dukes. Between 1714 and 1716 architect Hermann Korb added a new Baroque timber-framed facade to the castle. The stone entrance gate and the sculptures by Austrian Franz Finck on the bridge and along the moat all also date to this period. The sculptures embody the dukes' virtues and duties.

=== Later life ===
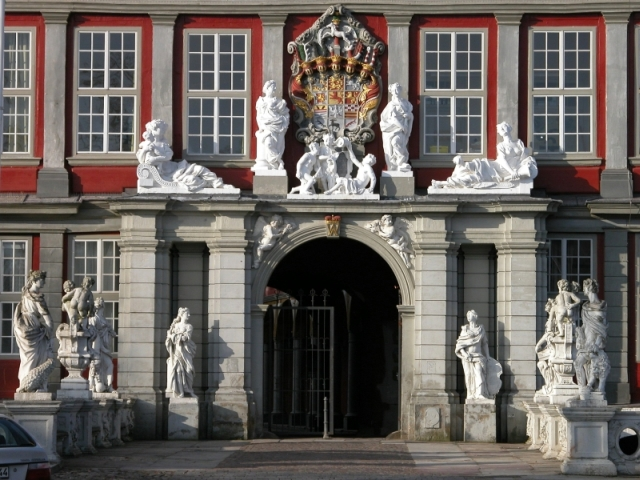
Castle gate

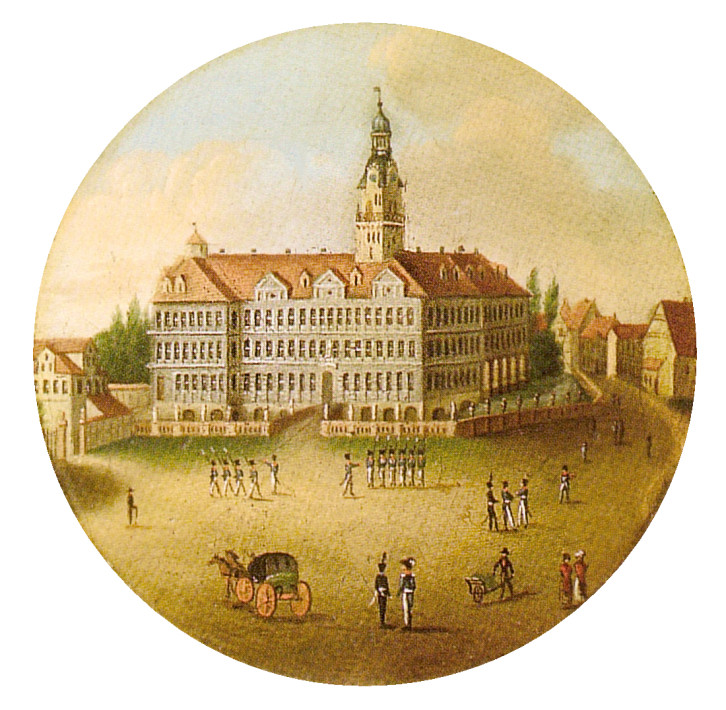
View in 1820

The ducal court relocated to Brunswick in 1753, leaving the castle empty. When Gotthold Ephraim Lessing was appointed librarian at the nearby Herzog August Library in 1770, the Duke assigned him some rooms on the first floor of the castle. Lessing spent five years in them but, After marrying Eva König in 1776, he moved with his wife into the Meißnerhaus next door to the castle, before moving in 1777 to the Schäffersche Haus, later known as Lessinghaus. During this period he wrote Emilia Galotti (1772) and Nathan the Wise (1779). A girls' school, the Anna-Vorwerk-Schule, was founded in the castle buildings in 1866.

=== 20th and 21st centuries ===
Today part of the castle is a museum preserving the state apartments and reception rooms from 1690 to 1740 in their original state and exhibiting many paintings and furniture, most on loan from Prince Ernst August of Hanover. There is also an exhibition of upper- and middle-class objects from 1700 to the present day.

In 1969 the Gymnasium im Schloss (GiS) was founded in the castle buildings. The school's language laboratory and the Hausmannsturm were damaged by fire and so were restored as part of the museum. Since 1991 the castle has also housed the administration buildings of the Bundesakademie für kulturelle Bildung Wolfenbüttel, whilst the amateur theatre group "kleine bühne Wolfenbüttel e.V." puts on shows in the castle courtyards during the town's annual KulturSommer summer festival. That festival also includes concerts by the Posaunenchor Wolfenbüttel brass band in the Hausmannsturm, featuring music by Praetorius and other composers. Four times a year the courtyards also host the Die Wolfenbüttler eV, who re-enact the Baroque changing of the guard by the Ducal Guards. A Baroque reenactor also plays a dance-master once a month, giving tours of the museum. In 2011 the castle was a filming location for Lessons of a Dream.

== Bibliography (in German) ==
- Peter Albrecht, Simon Paulus: Hermann Korb und seine Zeit. Barockes Bauen im Fürstentum Braunschweig-Wolfenbüttel. Hrsg. vom Museum im Schloss Wolfenbüttel und dem Fachgebiet Baugeschichte der Technischen Universität Braunschweig, Appelhans, Braunschweig 2006. ISBN 3-937664-51-3
- Horst Appuhn: Schloß Wolfenbüttel (Große Baudenkmäler, Heft 183). München/Berlin 1964
- Grote, Hans-Henning u. Mitarbeiter: Schloss Wolfenbüttel. Residenz der Herzöge zu Braunschweig und Lüneburg. Appelhans Verlag, Braunschweig 2005. ISBN 3-937664-32-7
- Rolf Hagen: Schloß Wolfenbüttel (Große Baudenkmäler, Heft 325). 2. Auflage, München/Berlin 1986

== External links (in German) ==
- Official website
- Reconstructions of:
  - the castle in 1720
  - the Burg Wolfenbüttel
  - the festival of 1660
  - the festival of 1745
- Description of the castle and its heraldry
