= Knight academy =

Educational institutions for young nobles

Knight academies were first established in Western European states in the late 16th century. They prepared aristocratic youth for state and military service. It added to the hitherto rudimentary education of the aristocratic youth in natural science, statesmanship and languages. Later many converted to humanistic high schools.

== History ==
Institutions exclusively for the education of nobles emerged only in the second half of the 16th century. They had their origin in Southern and Western Europe and were then also established in the Holy Roman Empire.

At first sons of nobles went to French academies during their Grand Tour. The first German institution modeled on the French ones was the Collegium illustre of Tübingen, founded in 1594. In 1598, another knight academy was founded in Kassel. In the course of the 17th century, many more facilities were founded, such as the Kriegs- und Ritterschule of Siegen.

After the Thirty Years' War, two new academies in Lüneburg (1655) and Wolfenbüttel (1687) were founded. Other foundations of this type emerged in many areas until the 18th century.

In the wake of the reforms of Joseph II all aristocratic educational institutions were dissolved. After Joseph II's death only the Theresian Military Academy in Vienna and the Innsbruck Academy were re-opened. In the 19th century academies lost influence in the rise of Gymnasiums. With some exceptions, they were either closed or converted into secondary schools.

== Knight academies ==
- Brandenburg
- Liegnitz
- Attain
- Lüneburg
- Dresden
- Wolfenbüttel
