= Wolfgang Wessel =

Consul of Germany to Turkey
- Incumbent
- Assumed office August 2018

Personal details
- Born: 30 January 1960 (age 66) Neustadt an der Weinstraße, Rhineland-Palatinate, West Germany
- Children: 4

Wolfgang Wessel (born 30 January 1960) is the consul of Germany to Turkey in Antalya.
