= St. Trinitatis, Wolfenbüttel =

Lutheran church in Wolfenbüttel, Germany

St. Trinitatis
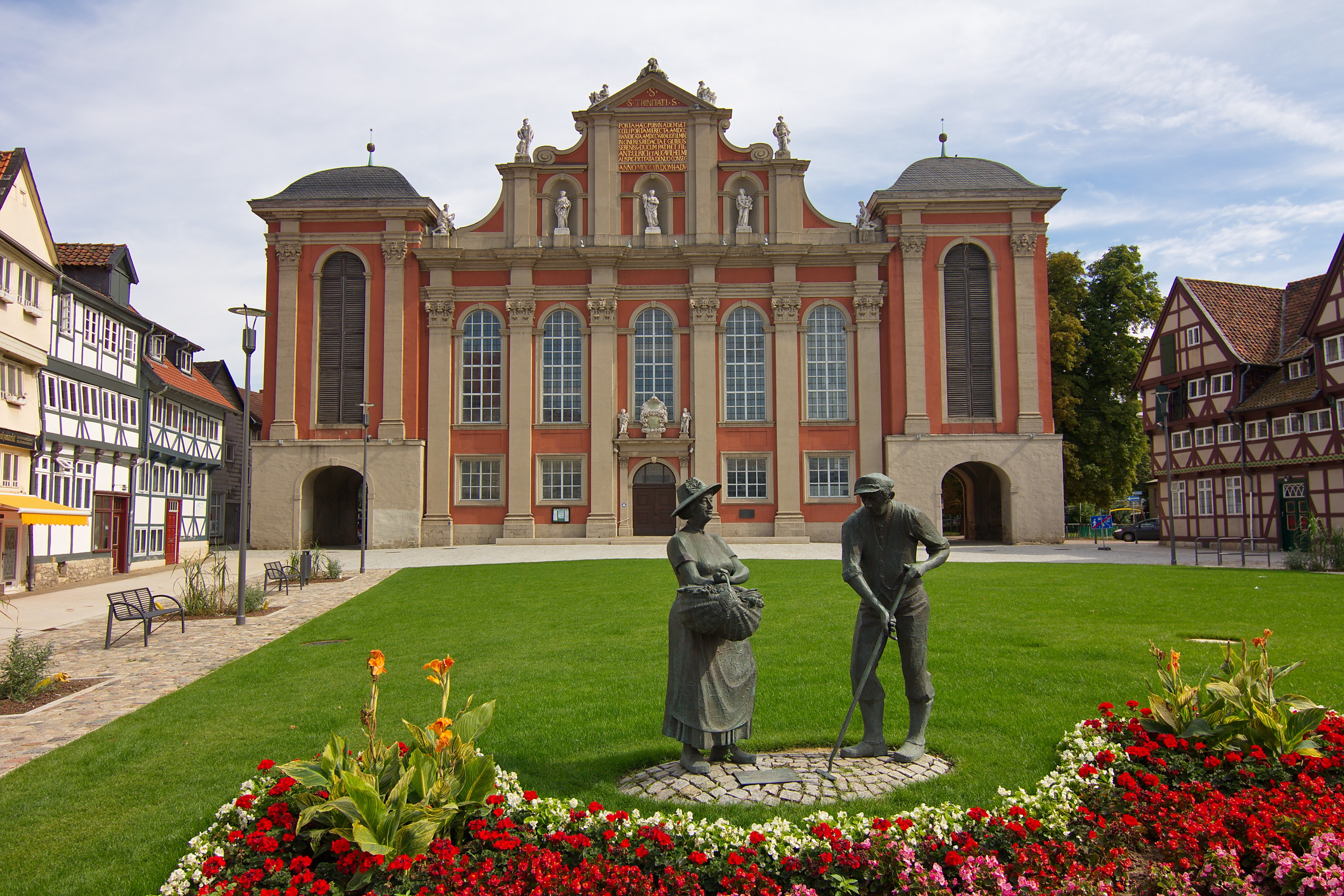
- Facade
- St. Trinitatis
- 52°9′44″N 10°32′28″E
- Location: Wolfenbüttel
- Country: Germany
- Denomination: Lutheran Church in Brunswick
- Website: www.marien-trinitatis-wf.de/trinitatis

History
- Dedication: Holy Trinity
- Consecrated: 1719

Architecture
- Architect: Hermann Korb
- Style: Baroque

Specifications
- Capacity: 1000

St. Trinitatis (Holy Trinity), or colloquially Trinitatiskirche, is a Lutheran church in Wolfenbüttel, Lower Saxony, Germany, consecrated in 1719. Designed by Hermann Korb, it is a rare Baroque church in Lower Saxony. It also serves as a concert venue.

== History ==
The Lutheran congregation in Wolfenbüttel held its services in the first floor of a historic gate building, the Kaisertor (Imperial Gate) built by Cord Mente in the 17th century, after its church was demolished. When it became too small for a growing number of worshipers, a church was planned from around 1692.

=== First Baroque church ===
A church was designed by Johann Balthasar Lauterbach, the duchy's master builder. He used the foundations of the gate and designed a domed hall in Baroque style, with a highly decorative facade framed by two stone towers that were not taller than the building; the facade, with a pediment, recalled that of Salzdahlum Palace. Construction was halted in 1694 when Lauterbach died and also from lack of financing. Hermann Korb, his successor, was finally able to finish the plans by using wood instead of stone. The church was consecrated in 1700, named St. Trinitatis. This building was destroyed in 1705 by fire resulting from a lightning strike.

=== Second Baroque church ===
The present church was designed by Korb. Building began in 1716, now with exterior walls in stone and the interior structure in wood. This church, seating more than thousand people, was consecrated in 1719, with details completed by 1722.

The church retained the facade to the west and the two towers from the first design. The hall was built on a rectangular floor, with an octagon of columns that carry two floors of balconies and a stucco ceiling. The main altar by A. Trew was added in 1754. The interior had colourful paintings that have not survived.

The first organ, built circa 1617, was originally in the court chapel in Schöningen. It was moved in 1722, on the order of Duke August Wilhelm. While the Baroque case was retained, the organ was replaced from 1964 to 1967 by an instrument of 29 stops and 2016 pipes.

The church is a typical Lutheran sermon church with focus on the sermon. The church is the seat of the bishop of the Lutheran Church in Brunswick. It also serves as a concert venue.

== Gallery ==
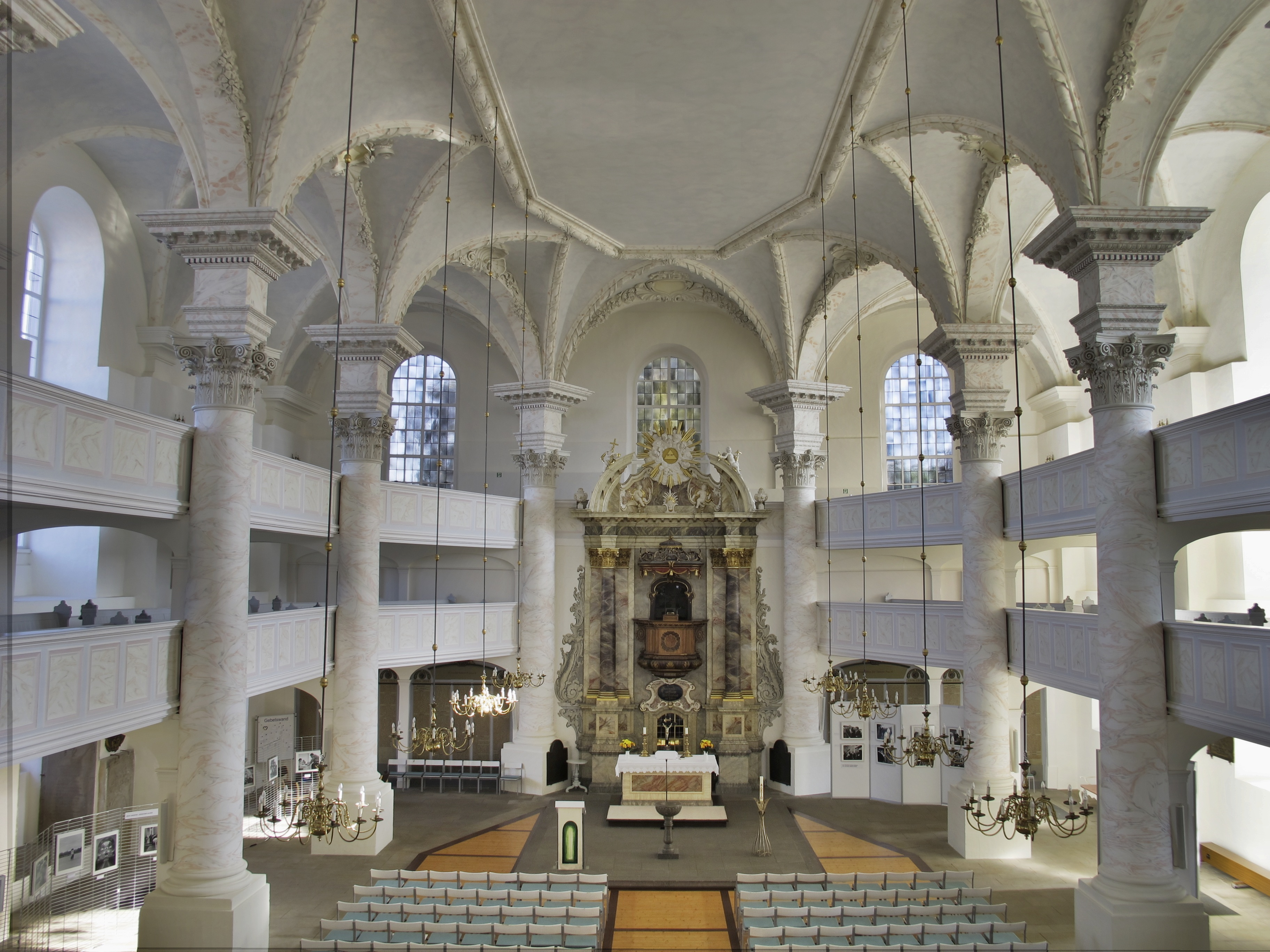
Interior, view to the altar

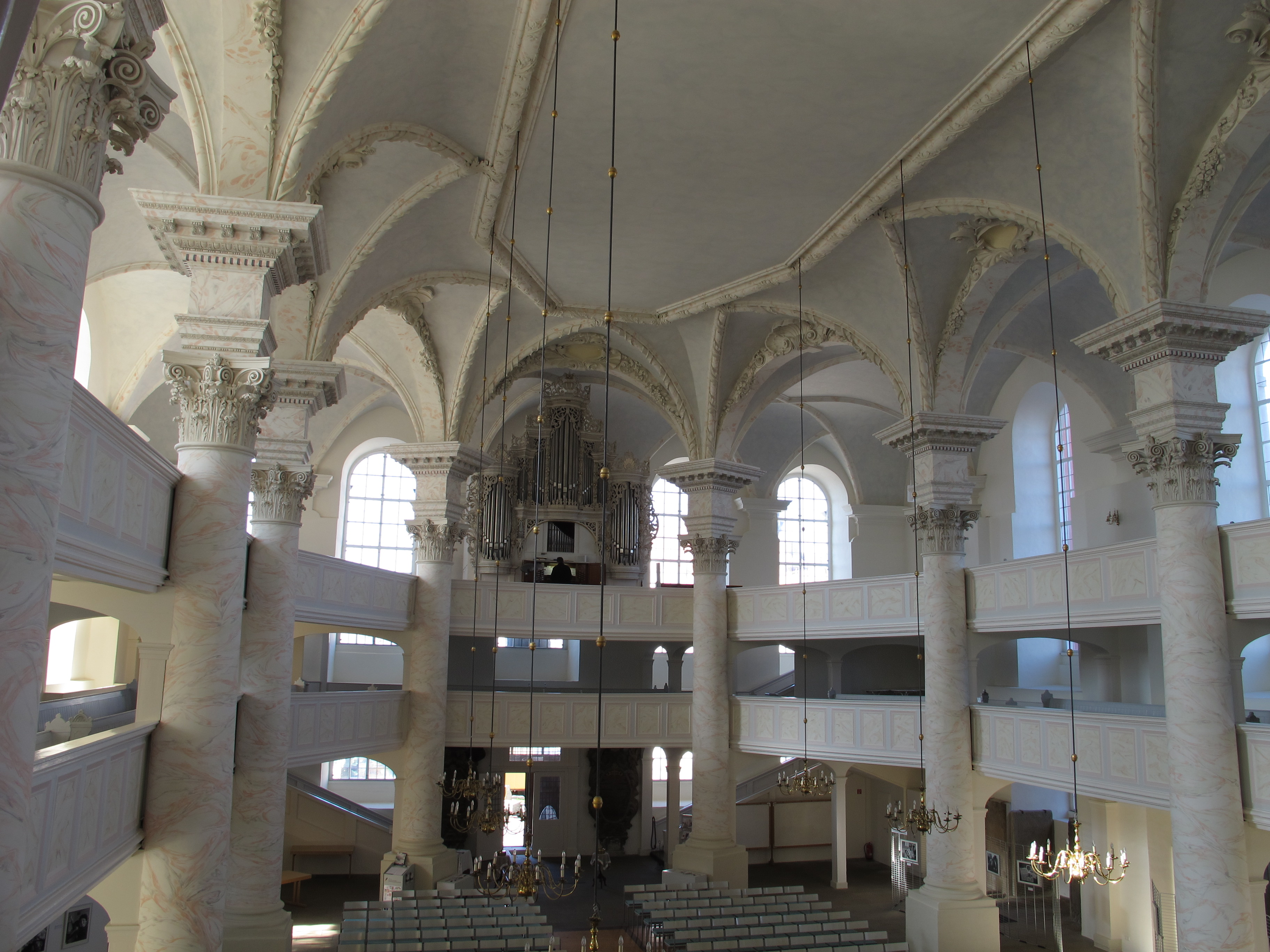
Interior, view to the organ

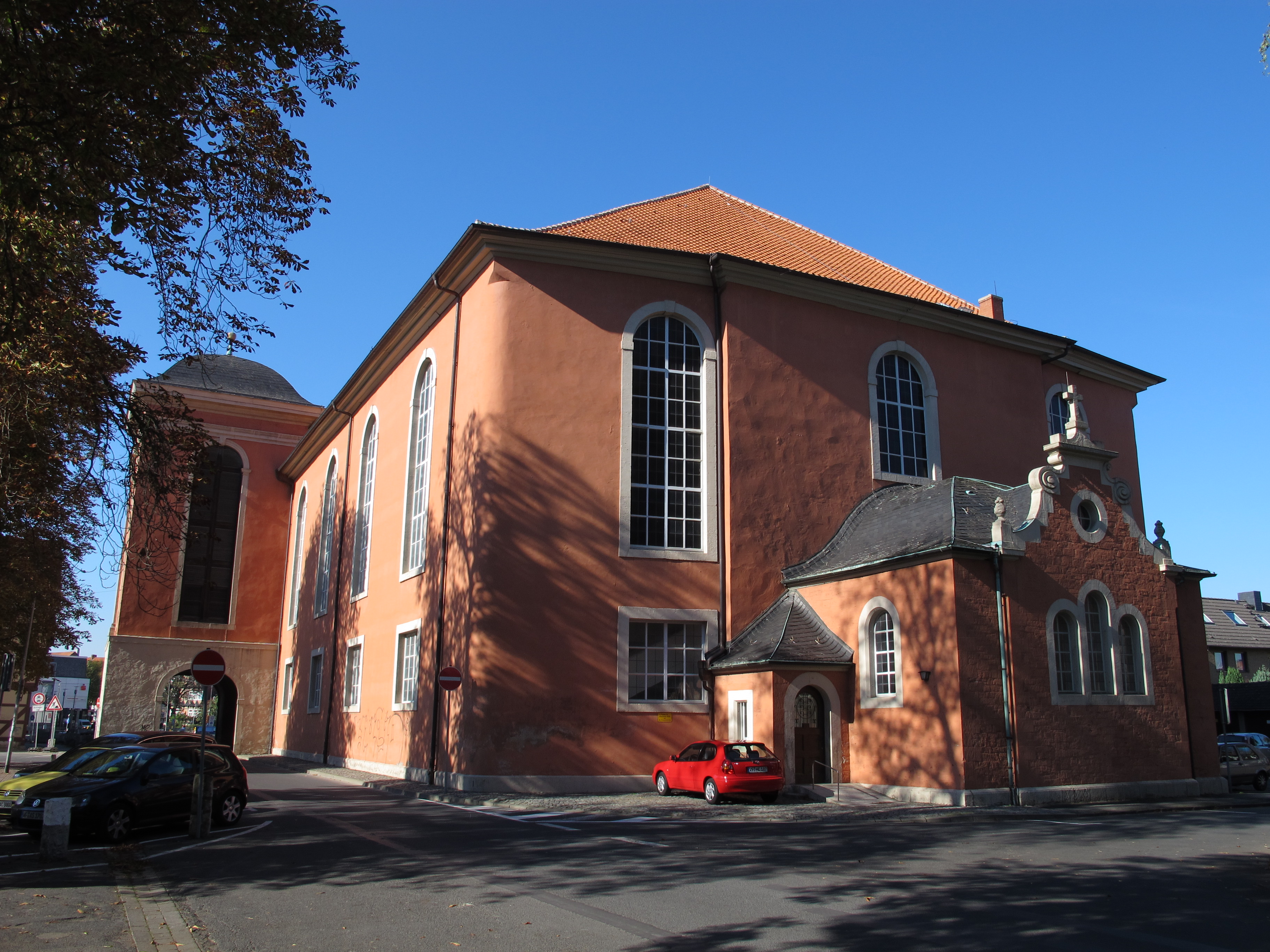
View from the east
