= Hermann Korb =

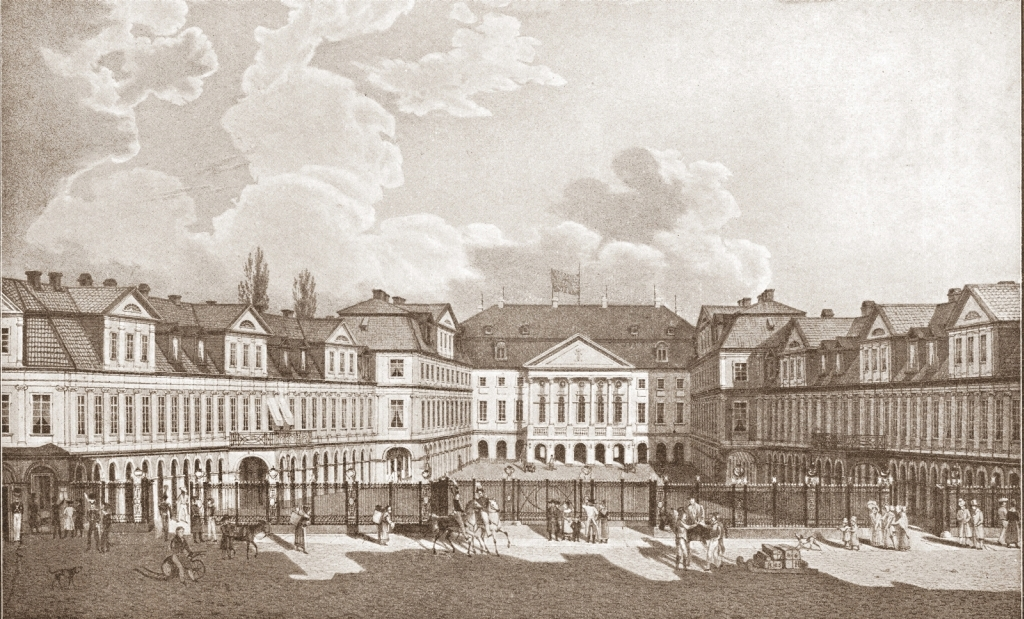
The original Brunswick Palace; begun by Korb in 1718. Lithograph from c.1825.

Hermann Korb (1656, Niese (near Lügde) - 23 December 1735, Wolfenbüttel) was a German architect who worked mainly in the Principality of Brunswick-Wolfenbüttel.

== Life ==
Little is known of his early life. It is generally believed that he started as a carpenter and was inspired to teach himself architecture during a trip to Italy with his employer, Duke Anton Ulrich. It has also been reported that he was unable to draw, leaving the details to his assistants. All of this has been disputed.

In 1689, he became the first Royal "Bauvogt" (Building Bailiff, or Inspector) in Wolfenbüttel then, in 1692, the "Bauverwalter" (Building Administrator), working in cooperation with the Landbaumeister (Master Builder) Johann Balthasar Lauterbach. Korb took over Lauterbach's duties after his death and completed many of his projects, which had languished because of his long illness. However, Korb wasn't officially promoted until 1704, when all of his work was being done from his own original designs.

Construction proceeded at a fast pace during his 40-year tenure. Many of his structures no longer exist because, following practices that were common at the time, they were cheaply built, with wood panels designed to imitate sandstone, and quickly fell into disrepair. He retired in 1734 (possibly suffering from senility) and died the following year.

== Work ==
His best-known works include:

- The Schloss Salzdahlum (Begun by Lauterbach in 1688: completed by Korb in 1697). It was here that Frederick the Great married Elisabeth Christine of Brunswick-Wolfenbüttel-Bevern in 1733. It was dismantled in 1813. Pieces of it may still be seen at various sites throughout the city.
- The original Brunswick Palace (Begun by Korb in 1718, but not finished until after his death). It was destroyed by fire in 1830 and rebuilt by Carl Theodor Ottmer.
- Renovation of the Schloss Blankenburg. Korb was commissioned to convert the medieval castle into a Baroque-style residence.
- The "Bibliotheksrotunde" at the Herzog August Library in Wolfenbüttel. It was designed to specifications by Leibniz, the Chief Librarian from 1690-1710. In 1770, Lessing began work there as a librarian. It was demolished in 1887.

== Samples of his other work ==
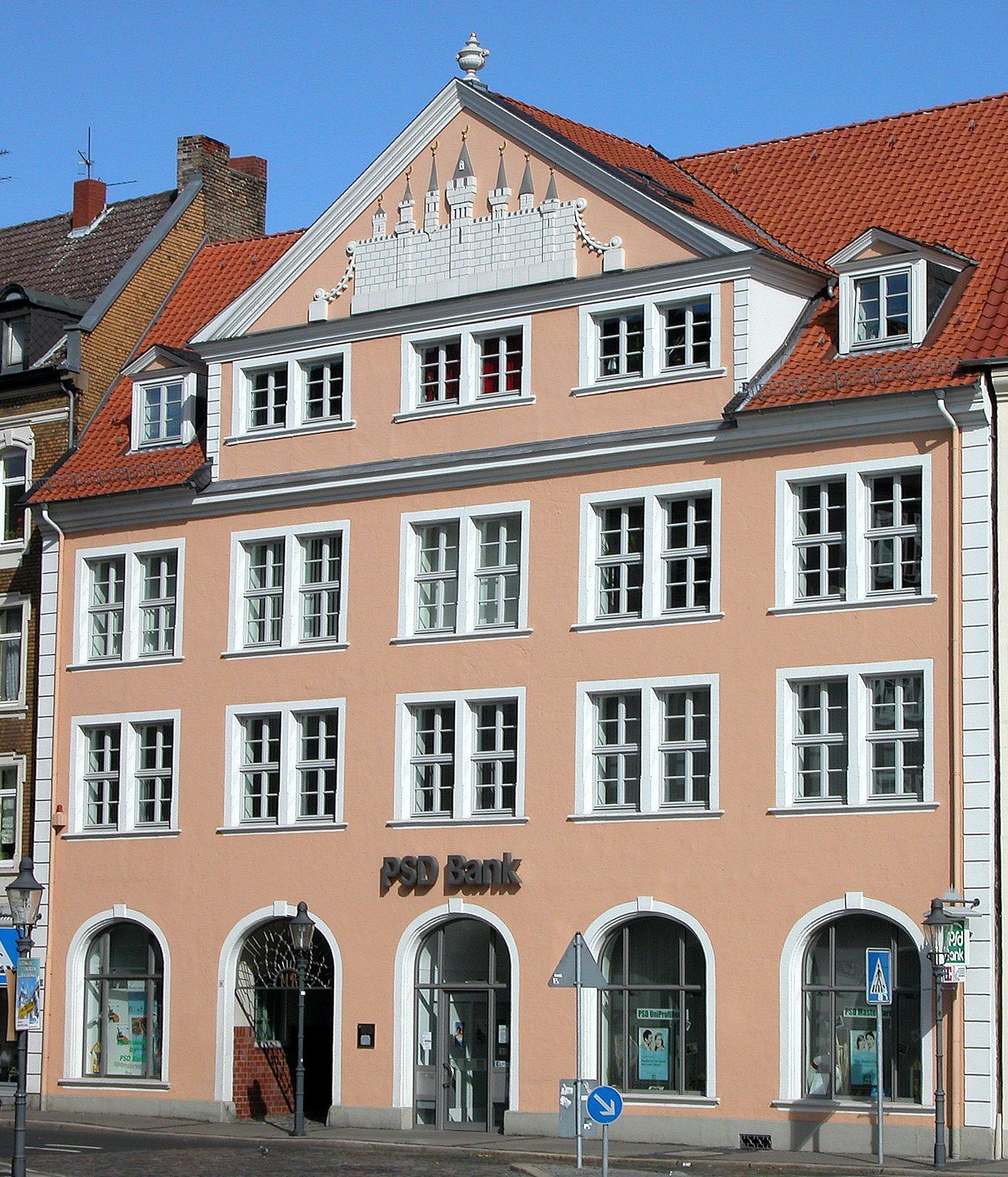
House of the Seven Towers. Occupied since 1294, its façade was rebuilt by Korb in 1708

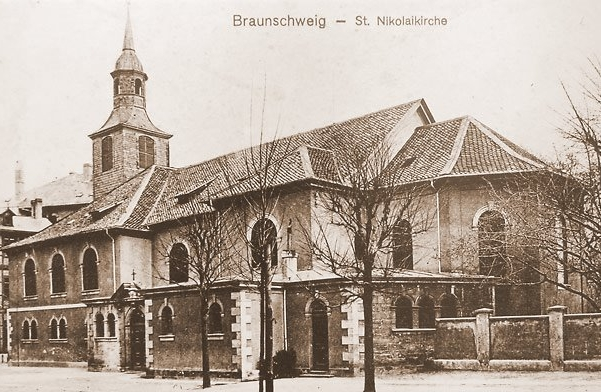
Church of St.Nicolai, Braunschweig (1710-1712). Destroyed in 1944

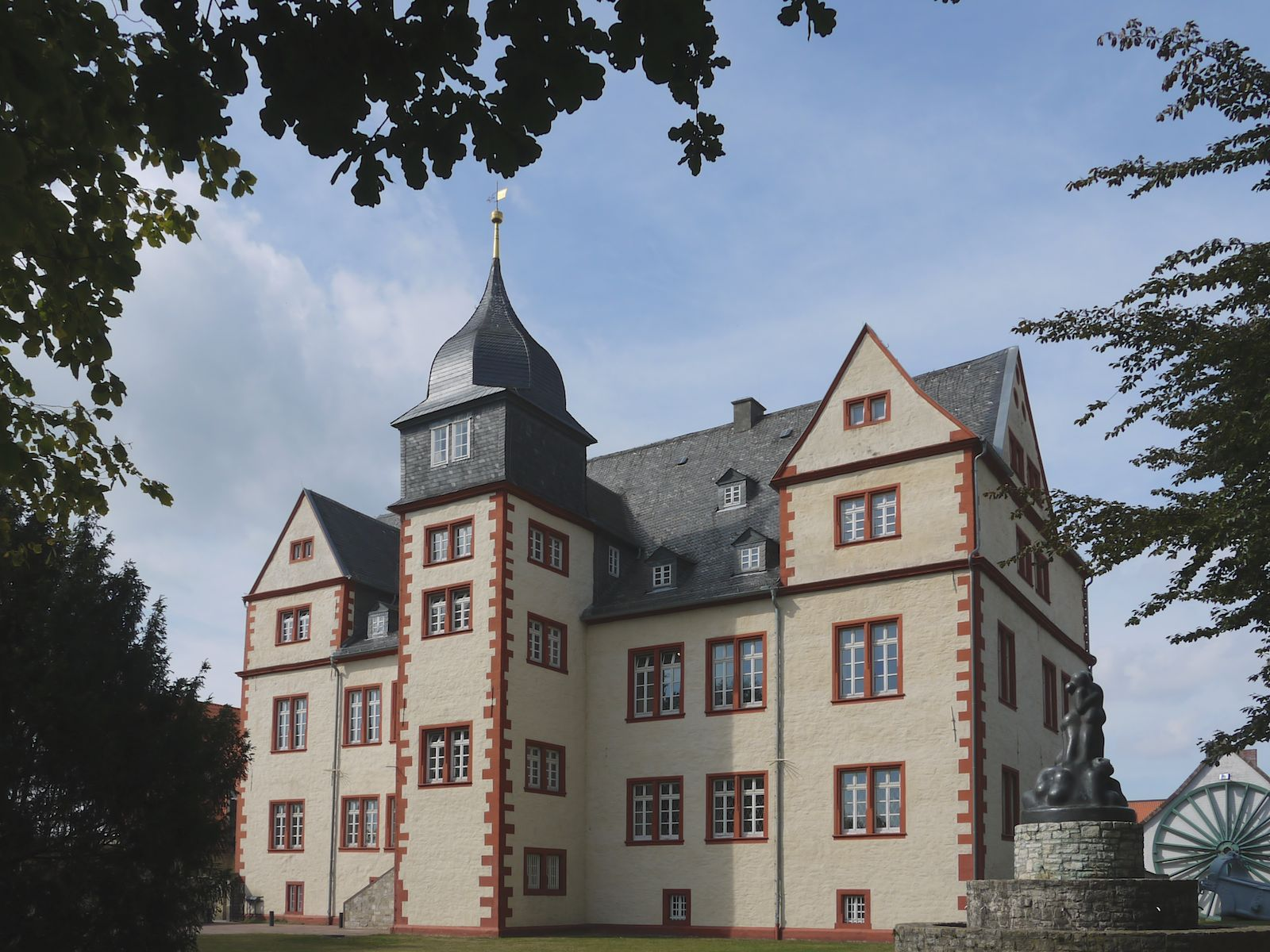
Schloss Salder. Originally built in 1608, remodeled and expanded by Korb (1695-1713)

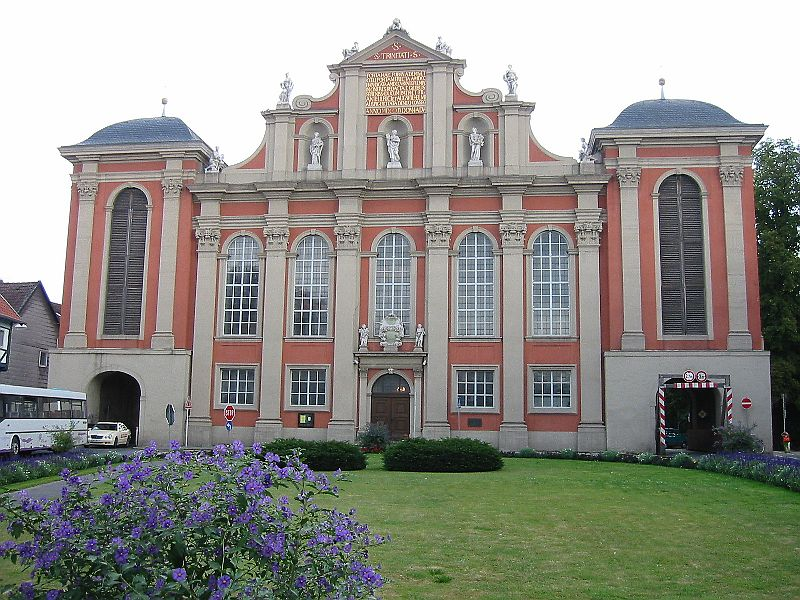
St. Trinitatis, Wolfenbüttel. Built in 1700; destroyed by fire in 1705; rebuilt 1716-1718.

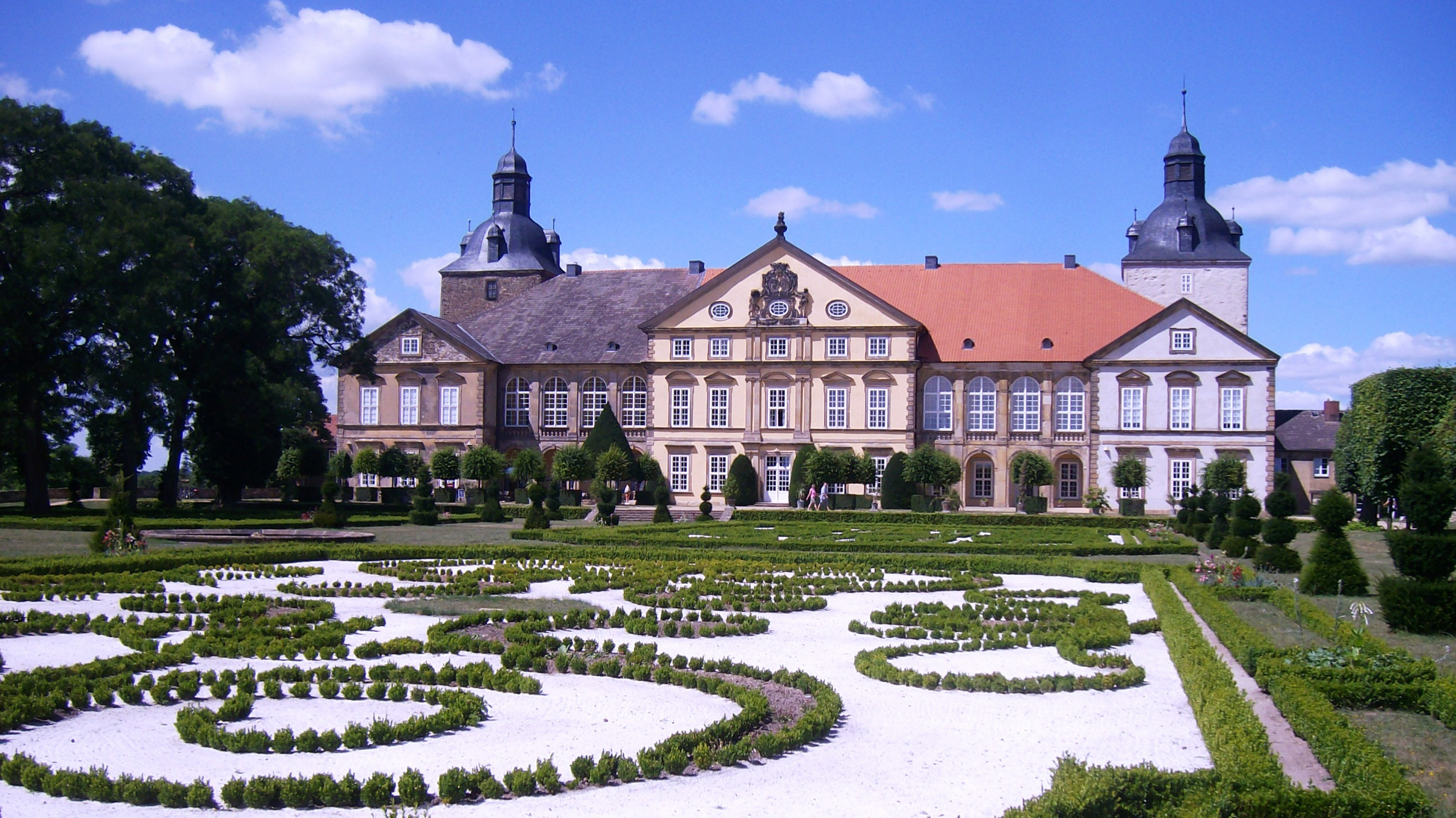
Hundisburg Castle near Haldensleben. Built from 1693; partly destroyed by fire in 1945 and reconstructed since 1994.
