= Wolfenbüttel =

- Town
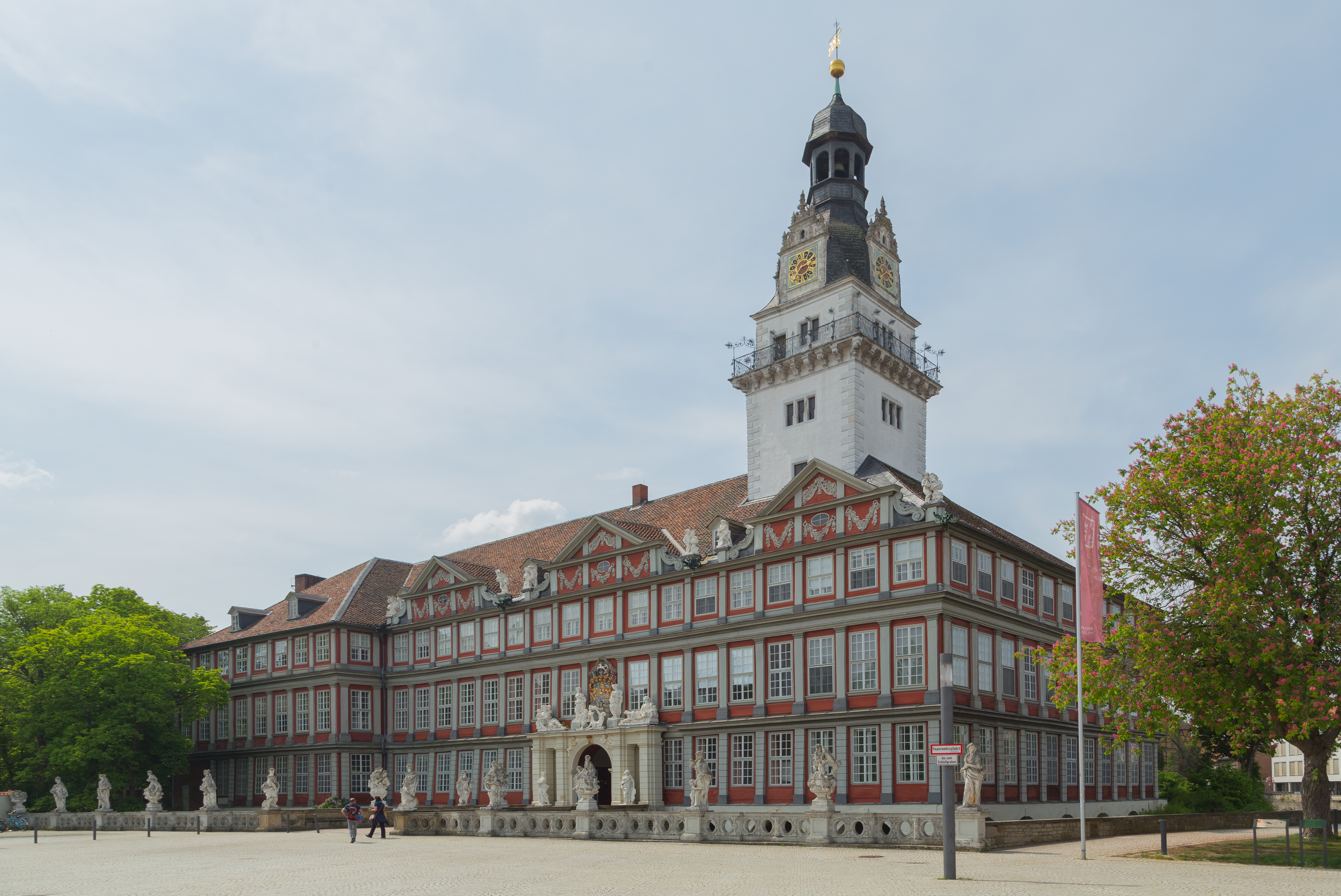
- Wolfenbüttel Castle

- Flag Coat of arms

- Location of Wolfenbüttel within Wolfenbüttel district
- Interactive map of Wolfenbüttel
- Location within Germany Location within Lower Saxony
- Coordinates: 52°09′44″N 10°32′13″E
- Country: Germany
- State: Lower Saxony
- District: Wolfenbüttel
- Subdivisions: 10 districts

Government
  - Mayor (2021–26): Ivica Lukanic (Ind.)

Area
  - Total: 78.74 km^{2} (30.40 sq mi)
- Elevation: 77 m (253 ft)

Population (2025-12-31)
  - Total: 52,511
  - Density: 666.9/km^{2} (1,727/sq mi)
- Time zone: UTC+01:00 (CET)
  - Summer (DST): UTC+02:00 (CEST)
- Postal codes: 38300, 38302, 38304
- Dialling codes: 05331
- Vehicle registration: WF
- Website: www.wolfenbuettel.de

Wolfenbüttel (German pronunciation: [ˌvɔlfn̩ˈbʏtl̩]; Low German: Wulfenbüddel) is a town in Lower Saxony, Germany, the administrative capital of Wolfenbüttel District. It is best known as the location of the internationally renowned Herzog August Library and for having the largest concentration of timber-framed buildings in Germany, numbering around 1,000. It is an episcopal see of the Evangelical Lutheran Church in Brunswick. It is also home to the Jägermeister distillery, houses a campus of the Ostfalia University of Applied Sciences, and the Landesmusikakademie of Lower Saxony.

== Geography ==
The town center is located at an elevation of 77 ft (23 m) on the Oker river near the confluence with its Altenau tributary, about 13 km (8.1 mi) south of Brunswick and 60 km (37 mi) southeast of the state capital Hannover. Wolfenbüttel is situated about half-way between the Harz mountain range in the south and the Lüneburg Heath in the north. The Elm-Lappwald Nature Park and the Asse hill range stretch east and southeast of the town.

With a population of about 52,000 people, Wolfenbüttel is part of the Hannover–Braunschweig–Göttingen–Wolfsburg Metropolitan Region and Braunschweig's urban agglomeration. It is the southernmost of the 172 towns in Northern Germany whose names end in büttel, meaning 'residence', 'settlement'. (Note: The Latin adjective deriving from the town is Guelferbytanus; e.g. Bibliotheca Guelferbytana, or Codex Guelferbytanus A.)

== Mayor ==
Between 2006 and 2014, the mayor of Wolfenbüttel was Thomas Pink, who was reelected in 2014 with 67.7% of the vote. In August 2018 he left the German Christian Democratic Union party.

In September 2021, Ivica Lukanic (Independent) became Wolfenbüttel's first politically independent mayor, beating Dennis Berger (SPD) in a run-off with 55.7% of the vote.

== History ==
A first settlement, probably restricted to a tiny islet in the Oker river, was founded in the tenth century. It was mentioned in 1118 as Wulferisbuttle, when the Saxon count Widekind of Wolfenbüttel erected a water castle on the important trade route from Brunswick to Halberstadt and Leipzig. Destroyed by Henry the Lion in 1191, and again by his great-grandson Duke Albert I of Brunswick-Lüneburg in 1255, the fortress and town, as well as nearby Asseburg Castle, were seized in 1258 by Albert I from the House of Asseburg, the descendants of Widekind. The castle was rebuilt by the Welf duke Henry I of Brunswick from 1283 onwards.

By 1432, the town became the permanent residence of the Brunswick Princes of Wolfenbüttel. Devastated in the 1542 Schmalkaldic War, it was largely rebuilt in a Renaissance style under Duke Julius of Brunswick-Lüneburg, including several gracht waterways laid out by Hans Vredeman de Vries. The duke vested the citizens with market rights in 1570 and founded the Ducal Library (Herzogliche Bibliothek, the later Bibliotheca Augusta) two years later.

During the Thirty Years' War, Danish troops under King Christian IV occupied the fortified town in 1626. Upon the nearby Battle of Lutter, they were besieged by the Imperial forces of General Gottfried Heinrich Graf zu Pappenheim. Re-conquered in 1627, the Wolfenbüttel fortress remained under the command of Gottfried Huyn von Geleen. In June 1641 the Battle of Wolfenbüttel was fought here, when the Swedish forces under Wrangel and the Count of Königsmark defeated the Austrians under Archduke Leopold of Habsburg, however, they failed to occupy the town.

Over two centuries, especially under Duke Julius' successors Henry Julius and Augustus the Younger, Wolfenbüttel grew to be a center of the arts and science: already in 1604, the composer Michael Praetorius (1571–1621) served as Kapellmeister of the Brunswick dukes. From 1682, the composer Johann Rosenmüller (1619–1684), who had to flee Germany due to allegations of homosexuality, spent his last years in Wolfenbüttel. Gottfried Leibniz (1646–1716) and Gotthold Ephraim Lessing (1729–1781) directed the Ducal Library, and established one of the first lending libraries in Enlightenment Europe. However, the ducal court eventually returned to Brunswick in 1753 and Wolfenbüttel subsequently declined in importance.

During World War II, the city prison became a major execution site of prisoners of the Gestapo. Most of those executed were members of various Resistance groups. Victims include Marguerite Bervoets and Fernande Volral, and a Dom Lambert, a monk of Ligugé Abbey in France, who was beheaded there on 3 December 1943.

=== Immigration ===
Roughly 14% of Wolfenbüttel are foreigners and 27.2% of the town has a migration background.

Rank	Country of origin	Population (31.12.2022)
1	Turkey	3,087
2	Poland	1,568
3	Syria	987
4	Iraq	902
5	Tunisia	622
6	India	554
7	Cameroon	433
8	Romania	414
9	Vietnam	300
10	China	277

== Main sights ==
- The baroque castle Schloss Wolfenbüttel. In 1866, the castle became the Anna-Vorwerk-School for girls. Today part of the building is used as a high school; it also houses a great example of Baroque state apartments, which are open to the public as a museum.
- Herzog-August-Bibliothek (HAB), the ducal library, hosts one of the largest and best-known collections of ancient books in the world. It is especially rich in bibles, incunabula, and books of the Reformation period, with some 10,000 manuscripts. It was founded in 1572 and rehoused in an interpretation of the Pantheon in 1723, built facing the castle; the present library building was constructed in 1886. Leibniz and Lessing worked in this library as librarians. The Codex Carolinus in the library is one of the few remaining texts in Gothic. The library also houses the bible of Henry the Lion, a book preserved in near mint condition from the year 1170.
- Klein-Venedig. A picturesque waterside building ensemble (Gracht) along the River Oker built in the eighteenth century.
- The churches Marienkirche (Hauptkiche Beatae Mariae Virginis), built during the seventeenth century, and St. Trinitatis (Trinity Church), built during the early eighteenth century.

The town is also the location of the former Northampton Barracks, which housed units of the British Army of the Rhine until 1993 (postcode: BFPO 101).

Today, Wolfenbüttel is smaller than the neighbouring cities of Braunschweig (Brunswick), Salzgitter, and Wolfsburg, but, because it was largely undamaged by the war, its downtown is rich in half-timber buildings, many dating several centuries back, and it still retains its historical character. Wolfenbüttel is located on the German Timber-Frame Road.

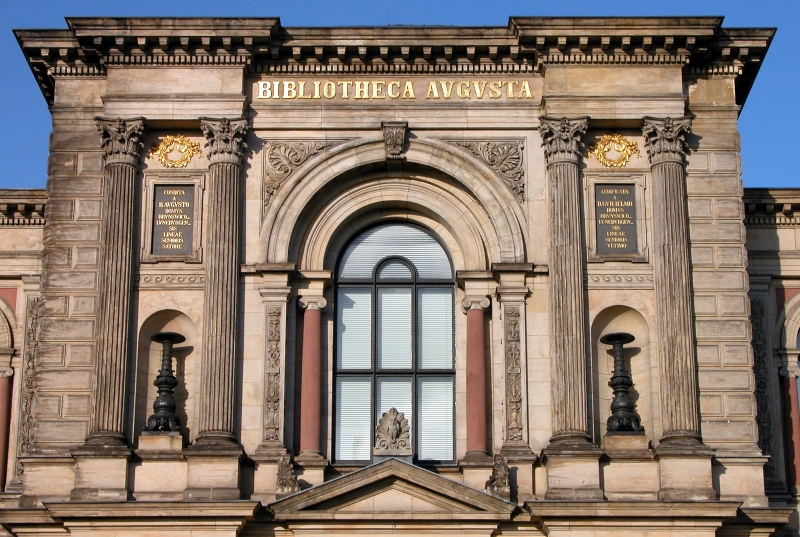
The portal above the entrance to the HAB

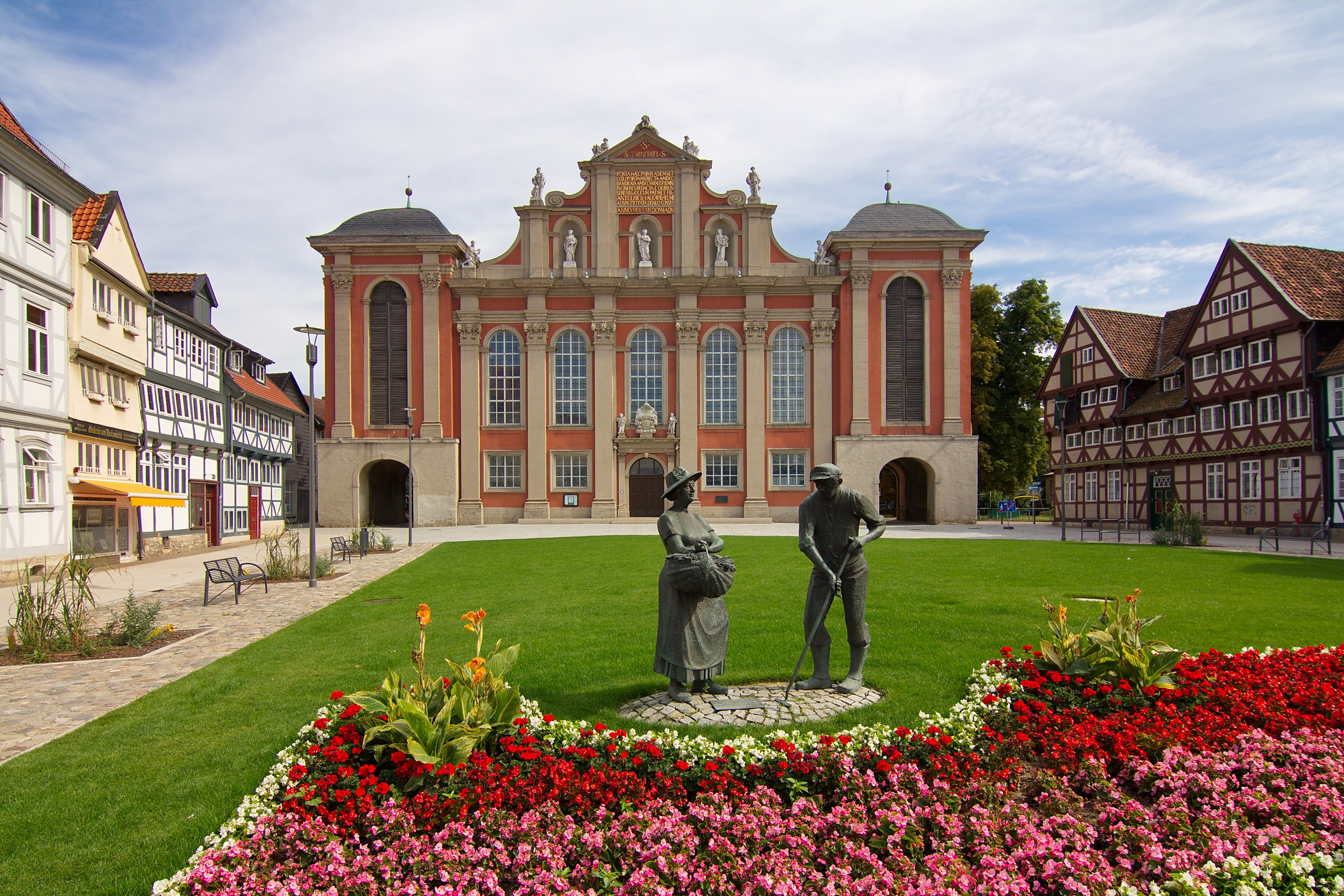
Trinity Church

== Culture ==
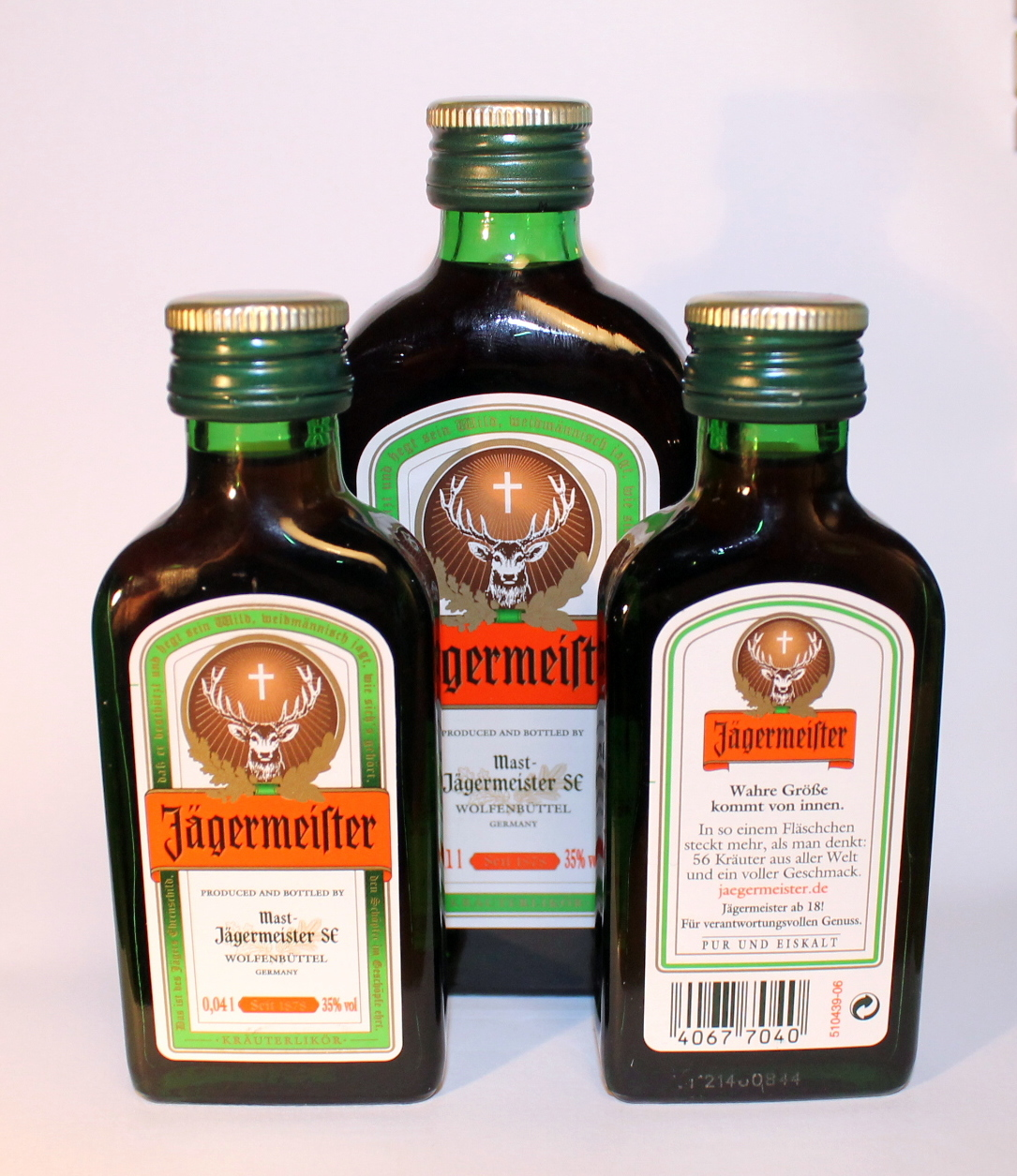
The herb liqueur Jägermeister is distilled in Wolfenbüttel.

Wolfenbüttel is home of several departments of the Ostfalia University of Applied Sciences and the Lessing-Akademie, an organisation for the study of Lessing's works. It is also home to the Niedersächsisches Staatsarchiv, the state archives of Lower Saxony, as well as the renowned Biblioteca Augusta. Beginning in 2009 the Landesmusikakademie Niedersachsen is located in the Seeliger Park and sponsored by the state of Lower Saxony to promote music education at various levels.

The herb liqueur Jägermeister's headquarters of Mast-Jägermeister are still located in Wolfenbüttel, as are some of its distillation sites.

Wolfenbüttel hosted the three-day International German Bus Pulling Championships in May 2009, where five-person teams pull a 15-tonne (16-short-ton) bus 30 metres (98 ft).

Every year starting in late November, Wolfenbüttel stages a Christmas market with food and drinks. Locals often come and enjoy the pre-Christmas atmosphere.

== Twin towns – sister cities ==
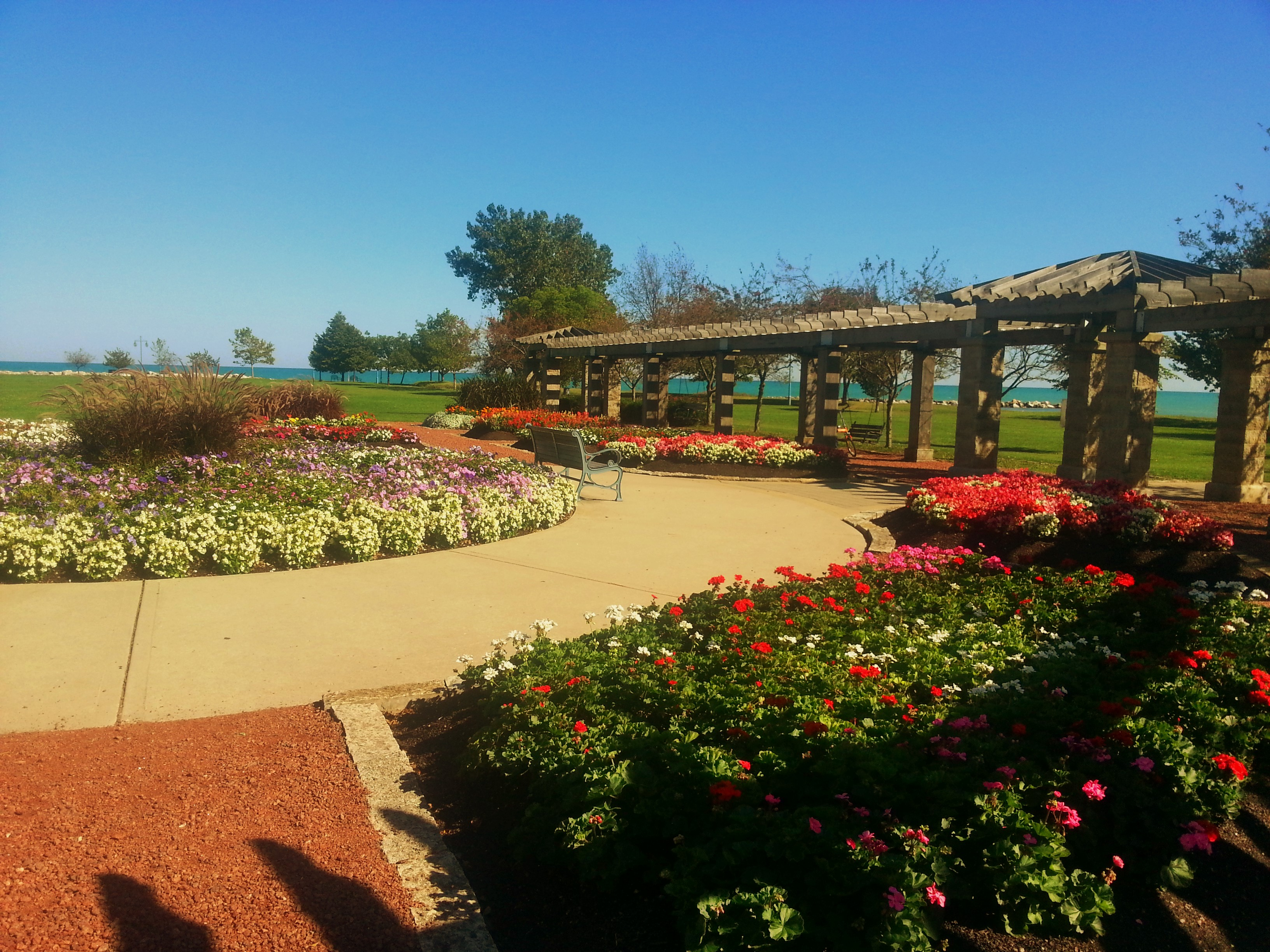
Wolfenbüttel Park in Kenosha, Wisconsin

Wolfenbüttel is twinned with:

- Sèvres, France (1958)
- Kenosha, Wisconsin, United States (1970)
- Satu Mare, Romania (1976)
- Kamienna Góra, Poland (2001)
- Blankenburg, Germany (2015)

A bridge in Wolfenbüttel is named after each of these cities. In Kenosha, Wisconsin, there is a park located on the shore of Lake Michigan named after Wolfenbüttel.

== Notable people ==
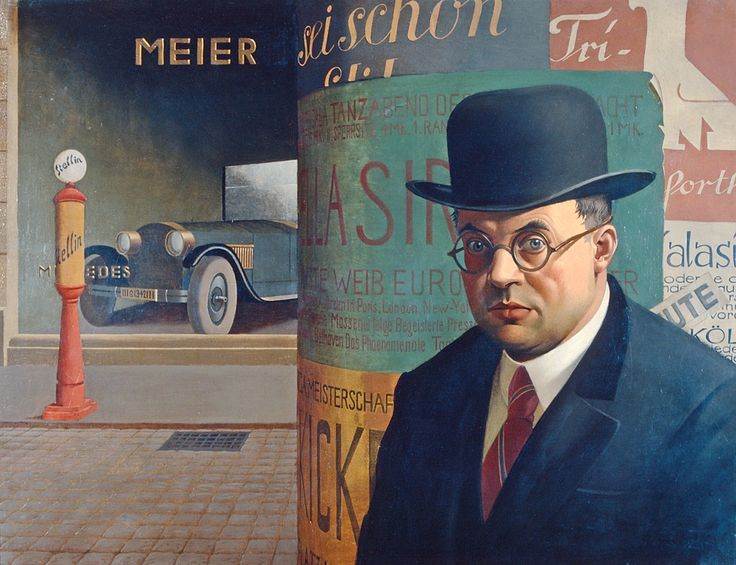
Georg Scholz self-portrait (undated)

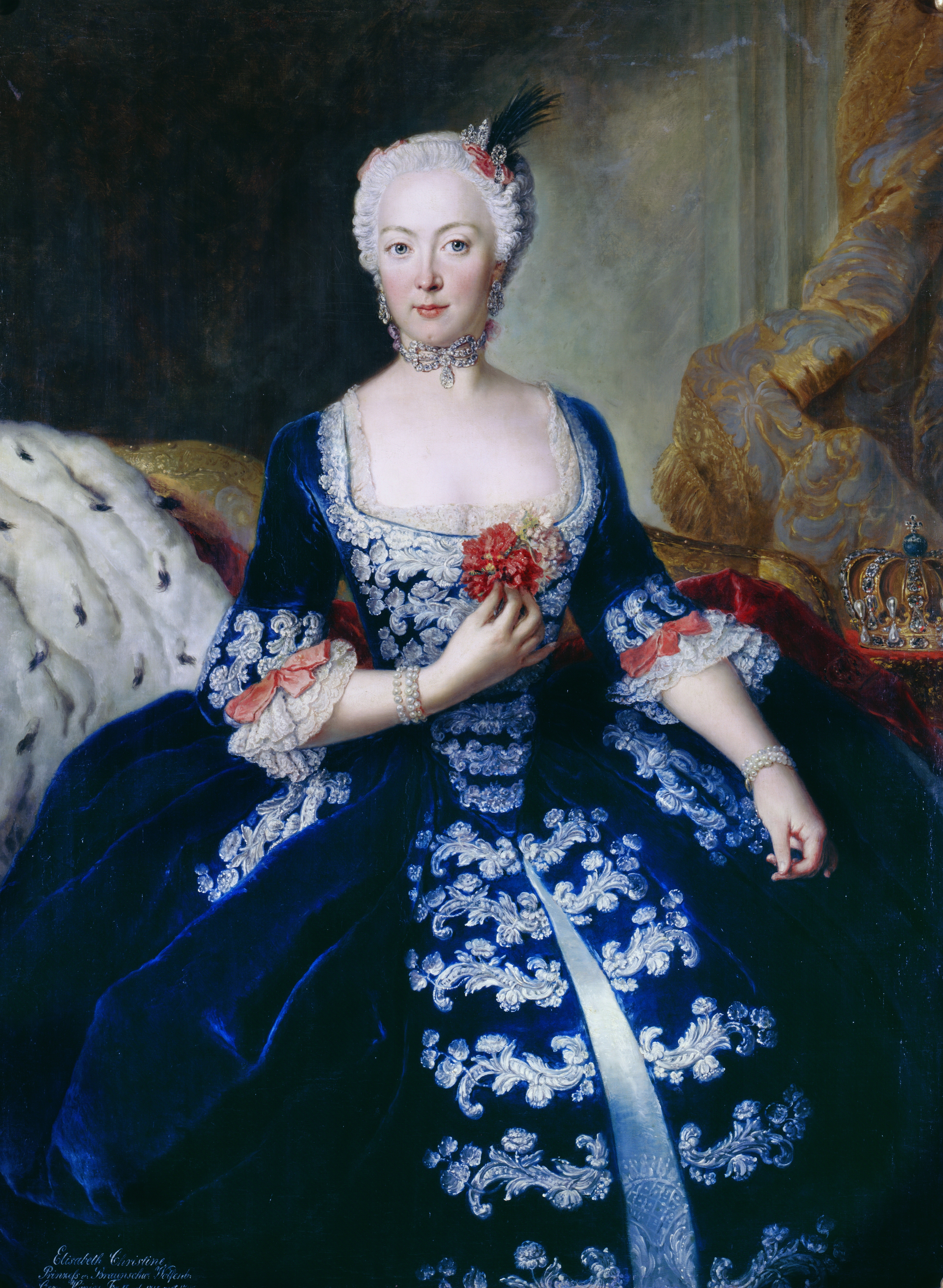
Elisabeth Christine around 1739

- Philipp Sömmering (c. 1535–1575), alchemist and fraudster
- August Querfurt (1696–1761), Austrian painter of soldiers and battle scenes
- Johann Julius Walbaum (1724–1799), physician, natural scientist and fauna taxonomist.
- Ludwig von Rochau (1810–1873), publicist and politician
- Theodor Engelbrecht (1813–1892), physician, professor and pomologist.
- Theodore Eisfeld (1816–1882), composer, chief conductor of the New York Philharmonic.
- Carl Friedrich Wilhelm Alfred Fleckeisen (1820–1899), philologist and critic.
- Victor Ehrenberg (1851–1929), legal scientist and Jurist
- Georg Scholz (1890–1945), a New Objectivity painter
- Marguerite Bervoets (1914–1944), Belgian teacher, poet, graduate in philosophy and literature, resistance fighter, beheaded at Wolfenbüttel on 7 August 1944.
- Maina-Miriam Munsky (1943–1999), a new realist artist.

=== Aristocracy ===
- Henry V, Duke of Brunswick-Lüneburg (1489–1568), Prince of Brunswick-Wolfenbüttel from 1514 to 1568
- Julius, Duke of Brunswick-Lüneburg (1528–1589), Prince of Brunswick-Wolfenbüttel from 1568 to 1589.
- Augustus William, Duke of Brunswick-Lüneburg (1662–1731), Prince of Wolfenbüttel from 1714 to 1731
- Elisabeth Christine of Brunswick-Wolfenbüttel-Bevern (1715–1797), Queen of Prussia for over 46 years
- Duke Ferdinand of Brunswick-Wolfenbüttel (1721–1792), Prussian field marshal from 1758 to 1766.
- Juliana Maria of Brunswick-Wolfenbüttel (1729–1796), Queen of Denmark and Norway from 1752 to 1766
- Charles William Ferdinand, Duke of Brunswick (1735–1806), Prussian field marshal from 1773.
- Duchess Anna Amalia of Brunswick-Wolfenbüttel (1739–1807), Duchess and composer.
- Elisabeth Christine of Brunswick-Wolfenbüttel (1746–1840), Crown Princess of Prussia

=== Sport ===
- Hans-Jörg Meyer (born 1964), sports shooter
- Simon Mensing (born 1982), footballer who played over 475 games
- Arnd Peiffer (born 1987), biathlete, gold medallist at the 2018 Winter Olympics

== See also ==
- Gärtnermuseum Wolfenbüttel

== Sources ==
- Bepler, Jochen: Kleine Wolfenbütteler Stadtgeschichte. Pustet, Regensburg 2011. ISBN 978-3-7917-2328-0.
- Fimpel, Martin: Erst Großbaustelle und dann eine andere Stadt. Der lange Abschied von der Festung Wolfenbüttel, in: Braunschweigisches Jahrbuch für Landesgeschichte Bd. 94, 2013, S. 161–192.
- Grote, Hans Henning: Schloss Wolfenbüttel, Residenz der Herzöge zu Braunschweig und Lüneburg. Appelhans Verlag, Braunschweig 2005
- (in German) Grunow, Heinz and Wessel, Wolfgang. Wolfenbüttel: ein Bildband. Grenzland-Verlag Rock & Co., Wolfenbüttel. 1977
- Schwarz, Ulrich (Hrsg.): Auf dem Weg zur herzoglichen Residenz. Wolfenbüttel im Mittelalter. Appelhans Verlag, Braunschweig 2003
- Stadt Wolfenbüttel (Hrsg.): Wolfenbüttel unter dem Hakenkreuz. Fünf Vorträge von Reinhard Försterling,[Dietrich Kuessner, Hans-Ulrich Ludewig, Wilfried Knauer, Dieter Lent; Heckner-Print-Service-GmbH, Wolfenbüttel 2000 GBV
- Residenzstadt Wolfenbüttel – Ein Streifzug durch die Geschichte; Nr. 9 (2004)
- Junges Leben in alten Häusern – 25 Jahre Stadtsanierung in Wolfenbüttel; Nr. 9 (2005)
