= Richter (surname) =

Richter is a surname of German origin (Richter is German for "judge").

== Geographical distribution ==
As of 2014, 71.2% of all known bearers of the surname Richter were residents of Germany (frequency 1:350), 13.0% of the United States (1:8,649), 2.2% of Brazil (1:28,857), 2.2% of South Africa (1:7,686), 1.8% of Austria (1:1,460), 1.3% of the Czech Republic (1:2,621) and 1.1% of Australia (1:6,626).

In Germany, the frequency of the surname was higher than national average (1:350) in the following states:

1. Saxony (1:80)
2. Brandenburg (1:121)
3. Saxony-Anhalt (1:132)
4. Thuringia (1:250)
5. Mecklenburg-Vorpommern (1:279)

== People ==
- Aemilius Ludwig Richter (1808–1864), German jurist
- Albert Richter (1912–1940), German track-cyclist and world champion
- Alexandra Richter (born 1967), Brazilian actress
- Andy Richter (born 1966), American actor, writer, comedian, and late-night talk-show announcer
- Anton Karl Richter (1690–1763), Austrian court organist, son of Ferdinand Tobias Richter
- August Gottlieb Richter (1742–1812), German surgeon
- Bo Richter (born 2000), American football player
- Bruno Richter (1914–1993), German military officer
- Burton Richter (1931–2018), Nobel Prize-winning American physicist
- Charles Francis Richter (1900–1985), American seismologist
- Christoph Richter (1596–1669), mayor of Stettin in Swedish Pomerania, from 1659 to 1669
- Claus Richter (born 1948), German journalist
- Conrad Richter (1890–1968), American Pulitzer Prize–winning Western novelist
- Daniel Richter (actor) (born 1939), American mime, actor and choreographer
- Daniel Richter (artist) (born 1962), German artist
- Daniel Richter (singer), Canadian singer, member of the band Eleven Past One
- Daniel K. Richter, American historian
- Dora Richter (1892–unknown), German transgender woman
- Édouard Frédéric Wilhelm Richter (1844-1913), French painter
- Emma Richter (1888–1956), German paleontologist
- Ernst Richter (1808–1879), German musical theorist and composer
- Eugen Richter (1838–1906), German politician
- Ferdinand Tobias Richter (1651–1711), Austrian baroque-music composer and organist
- Frank Richter Sr. (1837–1910), Bohemia-born rancher and entrepreneur in the U.S. and Canada
- Frank Richter Jr. (1910–1977), Canadian politician
- Frank Richter (footballer) (1952–2025), German footballer
- Frank Richter (rower) (born 1964), German rower
- Frank-Jürgen Richter (born 1967), German entrepreneur and chairman of Swiss think-tank Horasis
- Franz Xaver Richter (1709–1789), Czech composer
- Gerhard Richter (born 1932), German painter
- Gisela Richter (1882–1972), British-American archaeologist and art historian
- Guri Richter (1917–1995), Danish film actress
- Gustav Richter (artist) (1823–1884), German painter
- Gustav Richter (1913–1982), German Nazi official
- Hans Richter (artist) (1888–1976), German Dada painter, film producer and art historian
- Hans Richter (actor) (1919–2008), German actor and director
- Hans Richter (conductor) (1843–1916), German conductor
- Heinz Richter (engineer) (1909–1971), German engineer and author
- Heinz Richter (cyclist) (born 1947)
- Heinz A. Richter (1939–2024), German historian
- Henjo Richter (born 1963), German guitarist
- Henry Constantine Richter (1821–1902), British zoological illustrator
- Henry James Richter (1772–1857), English artist and philosopher
- Hieronymous Theodor Richter (1824–1898), German chemist
- Ilja Richter (born 1952), German actor, singer and television presenter
- Jan Richter, Czech ice hockey player
- Jascha Richter (born 1963), Danish singer-songwriter of the band Michael Learns To Rock
- Jason James Richter (born 1980), American actor
- Jean Paul Richter (1847–1937) German art historian
- Jean Paul Friedrich Richter (1763–1825), German novelist and author
- Jeremias Benjamin Richter (1762–1807), German chemist who developed the stoichiometry theory
- Joey Richter, American actor
- Johann Gottfried Ohnefalsch Richter (1703–1765), German parson and natural theologian
- Johann Moritz Richter (1620–1667), German architect and engraver
- John C. Richter, U.S. Attorney for the Western District of Oklahoma
- Johnny Richter, American musician, member of the rock group Kottonmouth Kings
- Johan Richter (inventor) (1901–1997), Norwegian-Swedish inventor and industrialist
- Johannes Richter (born 1993), German basketball player
- Josef Karl Richter (1880–1933), a Bohemian composer and military bandmaster
- Kamila B. Richter (born 1976), Czech-German media artist
- Karel Richard Richter (1912–1941), German spy
- Karl Richter (conductor) (1926–1981), German conductor
- Karl W. Richter (1942–1967), American aviator
- Les Richter (1930–2010), American football player
- Louise Marie Richter (1852–1938), art historian and translator
- Ludwig Richter (1803–1884), German painter and etcher
- Luisa Richter (1928–2015), Venezuelan artist
- Marion Morrey Richter (1900-1996), American composer and pianist
- Martin Richter (born 1977), Czech ice hockey player
- Martinus Richter (born 1968), German orthopedist
- Matthew Richter (born 1968), American arts producer
- Max Richter, German-born British classical composer
- Michael M. Richter (1938–2020), German mathematician
- Mike Richter (born 1966), American ice hockey player
- Milan Richter (born 1948), Slovak writer, playwright, translator and publisher
- Mischa Richter (1910–2001), Russian-born American cartoonist and artist
- Owen Von Richter (born 1975), Canadian medley swimmer
- Pat Richter (born 1941), American football player, athletic director of the UW–Madison
- Paul Richter (1895–1961), Austrian actor
- Pavel Richter, Czech ice hockey player
- Ralf Richter (1957–2026), German actor
- Raúl Richter (born 1987), German actor
- Robert Richter (disambiguation), several people
- Ronald Richter (1909–1991), Austrian scientist, head of the Argentine nuclear-fusion Huemul Project
- Rossa Matilda Richter (1860–1937), English aerialist and actress, first human cannonball
- Roy Robert Richter (1915–2007), Australian oilman and World War II pilot
- Roy Richter (businessman) (died 1983), American auto racer, inventor, and businessman
- Sergey Richter (born 1989), Israeli Olympic sport shooter
- Simona Richter (born 1972), Romanian judoka athlete
- Stacey Richter (born 1965), American writer of short fiction
- Sviatoslav Richter (1915–1997), Soviet pianist
- Travis Richter, American musician; guitarist of rock band From First to Last
- Ulrike Hoffmann-Richter (1958–2024), German psychiatrist
- Walter Richter (1905-1985), German actor
- W. D. Richter (born 1945), American screenwriter.

== See also ==
- Sergy Rikhter (born 1989), Ukrainian-born Israeli sport-shooter
- Richter (disambiguation)
