= Christoph Richter =

Wikimedia disambiguation page

Christoph Richter may refer to:

- Christoph Richter (1596–1669), German lawyer and statesperson
- Christoph Richter (born 1957), German cellist and academic teacher

== See also ==
- Christophe Richer (c. 1514–1552/53), German diplomat, historian, secretary, and poet
