= Kevin R. Stone =

American physician, orthopedic surgeon, clinician, businessman, and researcher

- Born: June 4, 1955 (age 71); Providence, Rhode Island, U.S.
- Education: Harvard College, University of North Carolina at Chapel Hill
- Known for: biologic joint repair and research, articular cartilage paste grafting (regeneration), meniscus allograft transplantation, ACL xenografts
- Scientific career
- Fields: sports medicine and arthritis research, orthopedic surgery, xenografts, biologic joint replacement
- Workplaces: Stone Clinic, Stone Research Foundation
- Website: www.stoneclinic.com

Notes
- Physician, orthopedic surgeon, clinician, researcher, and company founder of The Stone Clinic and the Stone Research Foundation in San Francisco and multiple startup companies

Kevin Robert Stone (born June 4, 1955) is an American physician, orthopedic surgeon, clinician, researcher, and company founder of The Stone Clinic and the Stone Research Foundation in San Francisco.

Stone’s most notable inventions have led to:

- the Collagen Meniscus Implant, the first successful and commercialized tissue-engineering template for re-growing the meniscus cartilage in the knee. This invention led to a public company, ReGen Biologics Inc.
- the first glucosamine beverage, Joint Juice, which gained wide distribution through the United States selling over 1/3 billion cans and bottles for people with arthritis. This company has been sold to Post Holdings.
- the first stem cell articular cartilage repair procedure called Articular Cartilage Paste Grafting which in long-term studies have demonstrated an 80% success rate at improving pain and function for people with arthritis.
- the three-tunnel technique of Meniscus Transplantation which has been demonstrated to be effective for people who want remain active and avoid a total knee replacement.
- the Rescue Reel, a personal escape device to permit people to escape from buildings as high as 100 stories.
- the Z-Process, an antigen stripping technique that humanizes animal tissues. The process allows the tissues to be implanted in people leading to the first successful xenograft ligament for ACL reconstruction called the Z-Lig. This device received CE mark approval for sale outside the US after completing a wide clinical trial in Europe and South Africa. Multiple other inventions using the Z-Process include antigen reduced Z- meniscus, bone, articular cartilage, heart valves, collagen injection, soft tissue reconstruction devices, and other applications.

Stone’s clinical work has focused on repairing and replacing meniscus, articular cartilage, and ligaments to keep people active. His busy clinic treats people from around world who come for biologic joint and tissue repair and robotic artificial knee replacement.

Stone’s public, non-profit foundation, the Stone Research Foundation, focuses on basic science and outcome studies that are mainly concentrated on cures for arthritis and techniques to speed the return of athletes to sports.

Stone is the past winner of the Resident’s Essay Award from the Arthroscopy Association of North America (AANA) (1989), The Cabaud Award from the American Orthopaedic Society for Sports Medicine (AOSSM), and The Albert Trillat Young Investigator’s Award from the International Knee Society (ISAKOS) (1989) and a Doctor of Humane Letters, honaris causa, from the Pacific Graduate School of Psychology.

His research has led to multiple peer-reviewed publications and over 50 US patents.

Stone is a weekly columnist for the San Francisco Examiner. He is also a regular blogger for The Huffington Post

Stone is an American orthopedic surgeon, who specializes in sports medicine and injuries of the knee, shoulder, and ankle joints. He has lectured and is recognized internationally as an authority on cartilage and meniscal growth, replacement, and repair. Stone is known for his development of the paste grafting surgical technique in 1991, combined with meniscus replacement, which are biologic joint replacement procedures for the regeneration of the knee joint. He has taught these techniques to surgeons in the US and worldwide.

He is the founder and chairman of the Stone Research Foundation for Sports Medicine and Arthritis, a center that conducts research in advanced surgical techniques and tissue regeneration in San Francisco, California. This research has led to advancements in cartilage replacement and regeneration, cruciate ligament repair and reconstruction, and techniques to prevent osteoarthritic degeneration. He holds more than 50 U.S. patents on healthcare inventions.

== Education ==
Stone was born in Providence, Rhode Island in 1955. He was educated at the Moses Brown School and Harvard College, class of 1977, where he led the Eliot House Crew to row at The Henley Regatta and played polo. As a cum laude biology graduate, he enrolled in the University of North Carolina School of Medicine graduating in 1981. He was trained at Harvard’s Beth Israel Hospital in internal medicine from 1981–82, then in general surgery at Stanford University Medical Center from 1982–83, and lastly in orthopaedic surgery at The Harvard Combined Orthopaedic Residency 1983-1986. He undertook a fellowship in research at the Hospital for Special Surgery in New York under Steven Arnoczky, D.V.M. and in knee surgery in Lake Tahoe under Richard Steadman, M.D., from 1986 -1987.

== Clinical practice ==
Stone founded The Stone Clinic, combining himself, an orthopaedic surgeon, with a team of nurses, physical therapists, imaging specialists, and patient coordinators, in 1988 to focus on caring for injured athletes and people experiencing arthritis pain. The clinical practice goal of rehabilitating all patients to a level higher than they were before they were injured set the tone. Surgical procedures were subjected to rigorous outcomes analysis with the results reported in peer reviewed journals. The surgical techniques have been taught to surgeons around the world, through lectures and videos.

Stone is a physician for The Marin Ballet and The Smuin Ballet. He has served as a physician for the U.S. Ski Team, the U.S. Pro Ski Tour, the Honda Ski Tour, the 48 Straight Ski Tour, the Old Blues Rugby Club, the Lawrence Pech Dance Company, the modern pentathlon at the U.S. Olympic Festival, and for the United States Olympic Training Center.

== Research ==
Stone initiated his research career in high-altitude physiology under the direction of Ross McFarland, at the Harvard School of Public Health. Working with his associate Dr. Spengler, Stone searched for a high-altitude environment in a city and published the first paper on carbon monoxide in hockey rinks noting the effect of carbon monoxide on the hockey players' visual acuity was similar to that of hypoxia at altitude.

=== Meniscus research ===
In 1984, Stone, at the encouragement of his mentor Dr. Steadman, turned his focus to replacing the meniscus cartilage in the knee joint. After two years of research to understand the biomechanics and biology of the meniscus, Dr. Stone concluded that if he couldn’t replace the meniscus, possibly he could re-grow it. With this approach he entered his Fellowship in research under the direction of Dr. Arnoczky and proceeded to design the first collagen meniscus regeneration template.

While a clinical fellow in Lake Tahoe, Stone initiated research at the Letterman Army Institute of Research in collaboration with Bill Rodkey, D.V.M., to test the collagen template in various animal models for meniscus, ligament, articular cartilage and intervertebral disc repair. These trials were subsequently published and led to several research awards including the Albert Trillat Young Investigator’s Award from the International Knee Society and the Cabaud Award in 1990 from the American Orthopaedic Society for Sports Medicine. The FDA approved the first human clinical trial of the collagen meniscus scaffold which was carried out at The Stone Clinic from 1991-1994. Recent 15-year follow-ups on these patients revealed continuing successful outcomes. The U.S. Food and Drug Administration gave U.S. approval for a collagen meniscus implant (CMI) device designed by Stone in 2008.

Stone turned his attention to complete meniscus replacement with a biological implant(rather than re-growing the meniscus) in 1994. He published one of the first techniques for arthroscopic meniscus replacement in 1991 and conducted the first long-term study of meniscus replacement in knee joint arthritis which was published in 2006. The replacement of the meniscus permits the arthritic patient to have improved pain relief and knee joint function as well as delay or avoid the time for artificial joint replacement. In a 2 to 7 year follow-up study, 89.4% of meniscus transplantation patients were successful, having shown significant signs of improvement in pain, activity, and functioning. A study on the outcomes of meniscus transplantation in active patients with severe cartilage damage found that the procedure provided significant improvements in pain and function levels for an average of 8.6 years with the majority of patients achieving their goal of participation in sporting activities.

=== Articular cartilage research ===
In addition to meniscus replacement, Stone focused on articular cartilage regeneration for the arthritic knee. His design of a “paste graft” technique with custom instrumentation was promoted by the DePuy-Orthotec orthopaedic company. The paste graft technique 2-12 year results were published in 2006 revealing 85% of the patients obtained improvement in pain and function scores. A study on the efficacy of the paste graft procedure for patients with osteochondritis dissecans showed that patients were able to benefit from improvements in pain, activity, and function levels for an average of 7 years after the procedure, with some benefitting up to 13 years.

=== Biologic joint replacement ===
The combination of meniscus replacement and articular cartilage grafting led to Stone’s pursuit of biologic knee replacement, a technique to fully replace the damaged cartilage in the knee with natural tissues. This program is underway at The Stone Clinic and includes a stem cell with shell graft approach to replacing the articular cartilage surface of the knee.

Allison Gannet, a World Cup freeskier Champion, had had 7 previous knee surgeries before having a biological joint replacement, with Stone as her surgeon. This procedure included the articular cartilage paste grafting procedure, and following, Gannet reported being pain free for the first time in 8 years.

=== Aperion Biologics, Inc ===
Xenograft ligament cartilage, bone, and tendon transplantation.
FDA-Approved ACL Replacement Study 2003 - PRESENT
CE Mark issued April 2014.

Stone's experience with collagen scaffolds sourced from bovine Achilles tendons led him to focus on other animal tissues that might be useful for orthopaedic reconstruction. In 1996 he initiated a research program to determine if the carbohydrates that cause rejection of animal tissues could safely be removed without damaging the tissues. His research led him to the New York Blood Center where a technique for removing similar carbohydrates was developed for blood. Dr. Stone identified and collaborated with the leading immunologist in the field Prof. Uri Galili in order to transfer the blood technique to orthopaedic tissues. Their work led to multiple patents, animal trials and subsequently, a human clinical trial of a porcine bone-patellar tendon-bone graft for reconstructing the anterior cruciate ligament (ACL) of the knee joint. In the surgical procedure, the proteins on the transplant ligament that would trigger rejection from the recipient's body are stripped off prior to transplantation. One recipient of this pig ligament ACL transplant went on to win the Canadian Master's Downhill Ski Championship, three times.

== Teaching ==
Stone mentors nursing students, medical students, residents, fellows, and other physicians who rotate through The Stone Clinic from various institutions around the world.

He lectures widely at orthopaedic courses and hosts the annual Meniscus Transplantation Study Group Meeting as well as the annual Professional Women Athlete's Career Conference.

Stone was the keynote 2013 Jacques Jenny Lecturer at the Veterinary Orthopedic Society and made an honorary member.

Stone's TED lectures on the BioFuture of Joint Replacement can be found at https://www.ted.com/talks/kevin_stone_the_bio_future_of_joint_replacement

and escaping from tall buildings: https://blog.ted.com/ted-blog-exclusive-a-new-method-for-escaping-tall-buildings/

== Awards ==
- Becker's Orthopedic & Spine Review, 70 of the Best Knee Surgeons in America, December 2010
- Doctor of Humane Letters - Honoris Causa, Pacific Graduate School of Psychology, June 2003
- Clear Choice Award 2002, "Carbonated Beverage Category" Innovative Glass Packaging Design - Joint Juice Bottle Design, Glass Packaging Institute
- Cabaud Award 1990, "Meniscal Regeneration Using Co-Polymeric Collagen Scaffolds", The American Orthopaedic Society for Sports Medicine
- The Individual Orthopaedic Instruction Top Videotape of 1990, "Anterior Cruciate Ligament and Knee Rehabilitation", American Academy of Orthopaedic Surgeons
- The Albert Trillat Young Investigator's Award 1989, "Replacement of the Meniscus: Original Investigation in Meniscal Regeneration and a Review", International Society of the Knee
- Resident's Essay Award 1987, "Ligament and Tendon Oxygenation Measurements Using Polarographic Oxygen Sensors." Arthroscopy Association of North America

== Additional projects ==
Stone is the founder or co-founder of multiple companies in addition to his orthopedic medical practice and research.

- ReGen Biologics, a publicly traded medical device company focused on meniscus regeneration subsequently purchased by Stryker Corp <https://ryortho.com/breaking/stryker-acquires-regen-biologics-meniscus-implant/n > At ReGen from 1984–1994, Stone invented the first collagen meniscus implant, a device designed to function as a regeneration template to grow a new meniscus cartilage in human knees. After Stone left in 1994, ReGen Biologics attracted controversy after the FDA initially rejected Menaflex, a device developed to replace knee cartilage. Regen Biologics enlisted four members of Congress, whom they had made significant campaign contributions to, to influence the evaluation process. The FDA then fast-tracked and approved the product despite serious concerns from the scientific community. ReGen Biologics was accused of "unduly" influencing federal agencies, and the FDA admitted it capitulated to political pressure for approving Menaflex, a device it had previously deemed unsafe because of its failure rate.
- CrossCart Inc., then Aperion Biologics Inc. a venture capital funded medical device xenotransplantation company. At CrossCart Stone led a team with Uri Galili and Tom Turek to develop a technique for removing the antigens from pig tissues so that they may be used in humans. The first xenograft device for reconstruction of ruptured anterior cruciate ligaments (ACLs) received FDA approval for human clinical trials, and a CE mark in Europe after successful wide clinical trials. < https://www.healio.com/orthopedics/sports-medicine/news/online/%7B33f80925-efcf-486f-9caf-4568b972384a%7D/aperion-biologics-receives-ce-mark-for-acl-reconstruction-device > This technology permits animal tissues to be used in humans without the need for immunosuppression.
- Joint Juice, Inc., now Premier Nutrition Inc. a San Francisco-based nutraceutical beverage company. Stone’s invention of Joint Juice was a response to his patient's statements that glucosamine helped them and their animals but that the pills were too large to take regularly. Joint Juice is the first beverage with a full day’s dose of glucosamine, proven to reduce pain, act as an anti-inflammatory, and aid in cartilage repair without side effects. Juice products are available nationwide at major warehouse clubs, grocery stores and drug stores.
- Rescue Reel, LLC, a San Francisco-based supplier of personal rescue devices. Stone shared the horror of watching people leap to their deaths on 9/11 and felt compelled to relieve the problem of building egress. He worked with an engineering team to design Rescue Reel, the first personal rescue device that individuals can use to escape from buildings up to 100 stories. The device is expected to gain wide application both for commercial buildings, residential buildings, oil rigs, ships, military applications and fire rescue.
- ProPrioSense Holdings is a medical device company using a fusion of computer vision and personal sensors to evaluate patients, permit remote assessment, enable digital physical therapy in the clinic and remotely, and perform continuous outcome studies without requiring patients to return to the clinic.
