= Karl Richter =

Karl or Carl Richter may refer to:

- Karl Richter (botanist) (1855–1891), Austro-Hungarian botanist
- Karl Richter (conductor) (1926–1981), German conductor, organist, and harpsichordist
- Karl Richter (gymnast) (1887–1918), German gymnast
- Karl Richter (sport shooter) (1876–1959), Swedish sport shooter
- Karl Richter (tennis) (born 1960), American tennis player
- Karl W. Richter (1942–1967), American US Air Force officer

== See also ==
- Josef Karl Richter (1880–1933), a Bohemian composer and military bandmaster
