= Roy Richter =

Roy Richter may refer to:

- Roy Richter (businessman), founder of Bell Sports
- Roy Robert Richter (1915–2007), Australian oil industry pioneer and RAF officer
