= Richter =

Richter may refer to:

== People ==
- Richter (surname)

== Places ==
- Richter, Kansas
- Richter Peaks, a group of mountain peaks on Alexander Island, Antarctica
- Richter Brewery, a building in Escanaba, Michigan on the National Register of Historic Places

== Brands and enterprises ==
- Richter (toy company), a German toy manufacturer of the early 20th century
- Gedeon Richter Ltd., a Hungarian pharmaceutical company
- Richter LLP, a Canadian financial consulting firm

== Fictional characters ==
- Richter, in the 1990 film Total Recall
- Richter, or Experiment 513, an alien creature from the Lilo & Stitch franchise
- Richter Abend, from the game Tales of Symphonia: Dawn of the New World
- Richter Belmont, from the Castlevania game series - see List of Castlevania characters
- Richter Berg, a hitman in the action games Hotline Miami and Hotline Miami 2: Wrong Number
- Felix Richter, from the 2016 multiplayer horror game Dead by Daylight
- Holt Richter, on the animated sitcom The Cleveland Show
- Renate Richter, a Nazi schoolteacher and co-protagonist of the 2012 movie Iron Sky
- Roxanne Richter, one of the seven evil exes of Romona Flowers from Scott Pilgrim
- Richter Sakamaki, in the Diabolik Lovers Japanese visual novel franchise

== Other uses ==
- Richter (electro rock), an electro-rock band from Buenos Aires, Argentina
- Richter Ric Jet 4, a 1970s experimental aircraft
- Richter's transformation, a medical condition
- Richter scale, a measure of the strength of earthquakes

== See also ==
- Rictor, a Marvel Comics character
- RICTOR, a protein in humans
