= Cristoforo Landino =

Italian humanist

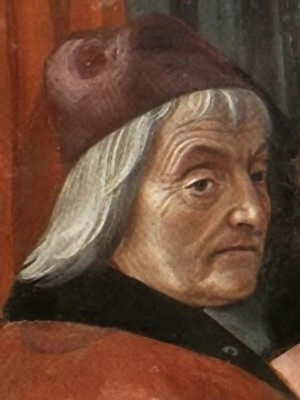
Cristoforo Landino from a fresco painted by Renaissance artist Domenico Ghirlandaio in the Tornabuoni Chapel, Santa Maria Novella, Florence

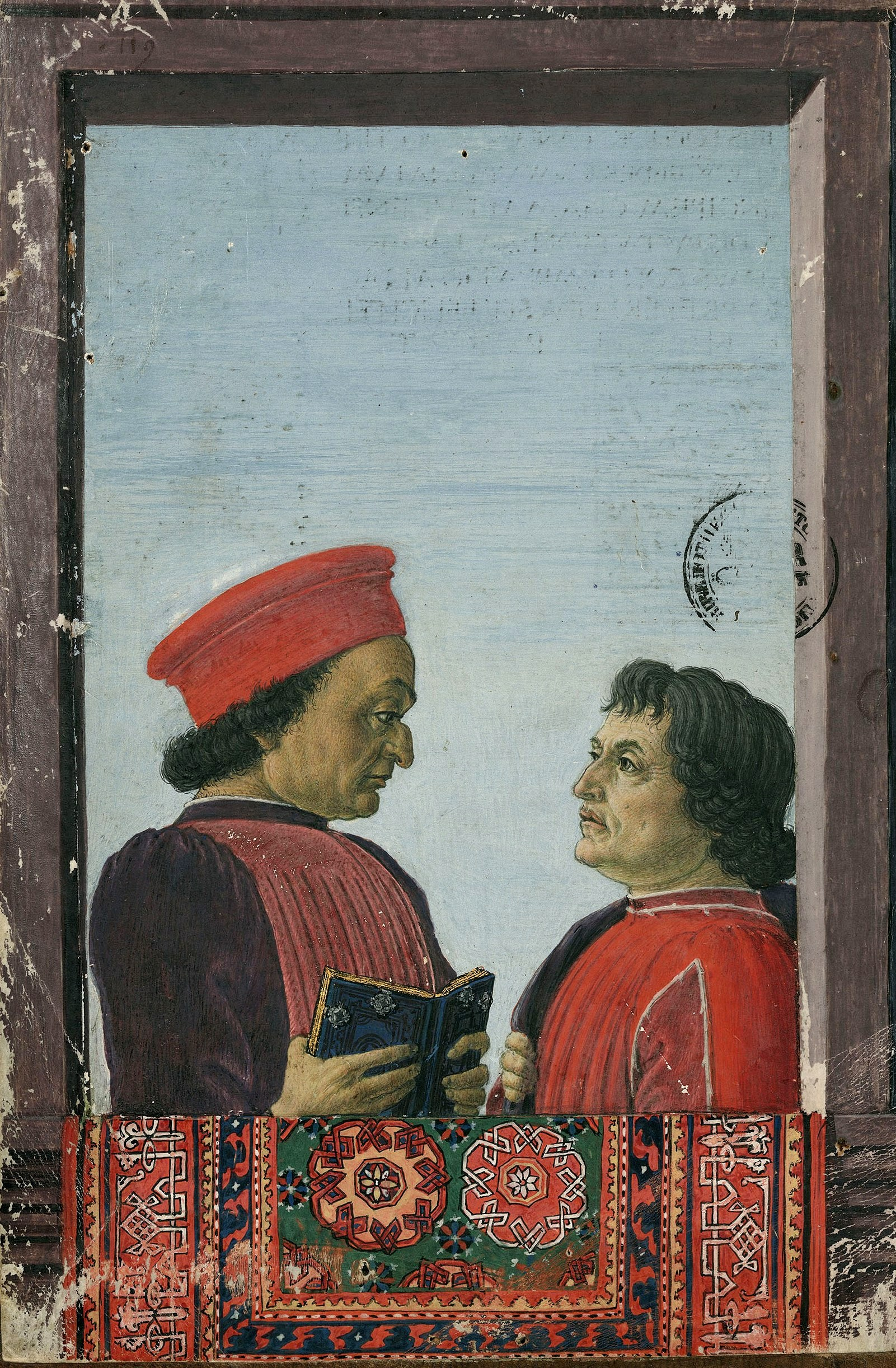
Federico da Montefeltro with humanist writer Cristoforo Landino (right), by Sandro Botticelli, circa 1460.

Cristoforo Landino (Latin: Christophorus Landinus; 1424 in Florence, Florence – 24 September 1498 in Borgo alla Collina, Casentino) was an Italian humanist and an important figure of the Florentine Renaissance.

== Biography ==
From a family with ties to the Casentino, Landino was born in Florence in 1424. He studied law and Greek (under George of Trebizond). Against his father's will, he turned away from a career in the law and decided to study philosophy instead, a decision he would not have been able to make but for the patronage of Piero di Cosimo de' Medici. Landino's wife, Lucrezia, was a member of the Alberti family.

In 1458, Landino replaced Cristoforo Marsuppini as the chair of rhetoric and poetry at the Florentine Studio. His students, seeking a more renowned teacher, initially opposed Landino's appointment, but he nevertheless remained and became an important part of the cultural and intellectual life of Florence.

Landino was a member of the Platonic Academy founded by Marsilio Ficino in Florence. He was the tutor of Lorenzo de' Medici and his brother Giuliano. Landino also held public office, first as chancellor of the Guelph party (1467) and later as scriptor of public letters for the Signoria.

Landino died in 1498 in a villa in Borgo alla Collina, which he received as a gift from the Medici.

== Works ==
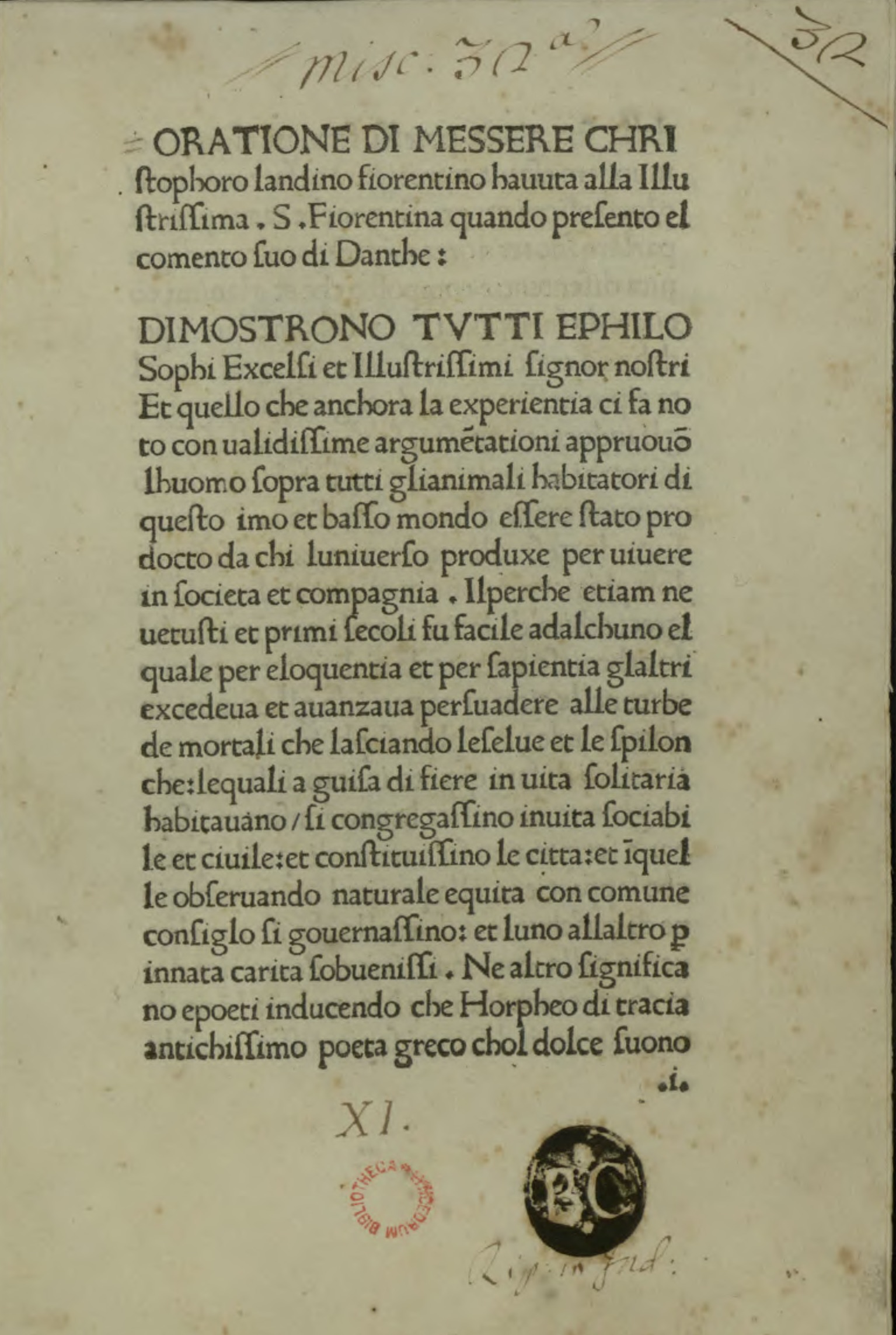
Orazione alla Signoria fiorentina

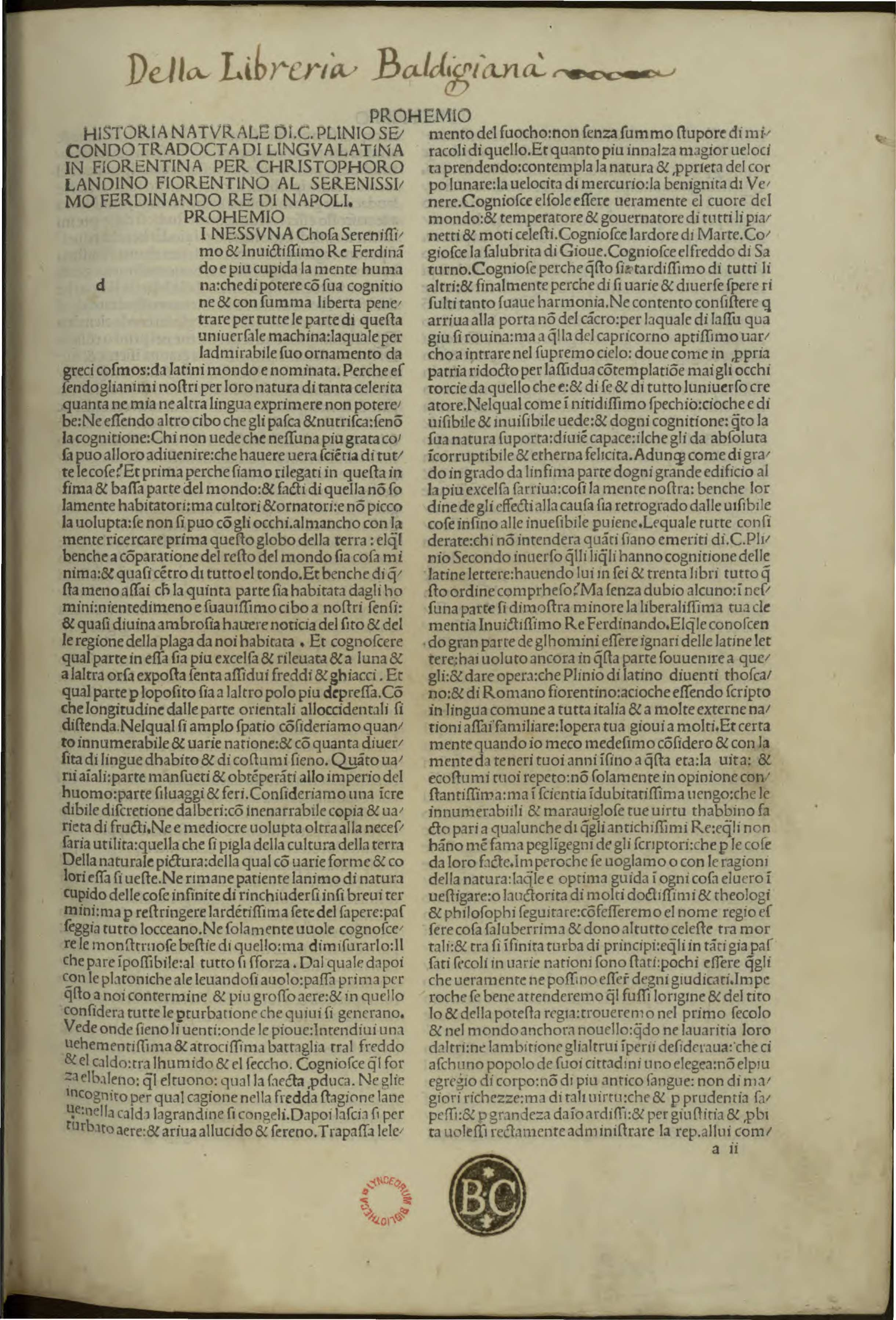
Historia naturalis translated by Cristoforo Landino, 1489 edition.

Landino was a prolific writer. He championed the use of vernacular Italian.

He wrote three works framed as philosophical dialogues: De anima (1453), De vera nobilitate (1469), and the Disputationes Camaldulenses (c. 1474). In the Disputationes several humanists compare the merits of the active and the contemplative life.

As the lady "Xandra" Landino published three volumes of Latin poems. They were dedicated in 1458 to Piero de' Medici. He also prepared many letters and orations, which were published long after his death in Italian in Venice (1561).

Of special importance to the Renaissance, Landino prepared commentaries on the Aeneid (1478) and The Divine Comedy (1481). To promote the use of vernacular Italian, Landino held lectures on Petrarch and translated and published Pliny's Historia naturalis (1476) and Giovanni Simonetta's Latin life of Francesco Sforza (1490). Among his pupils was historian Andrea Cambini.

== Bibliography ==
=== Editions ===
- Chatfield, Mary P. (trans.). Cristoforo Landino: Poems (Cambridge, Massachusetts; London,: Harvard University Press, 2008) (The I Tatti Renaissance library, 35).
- Formulario de Epistole Vulgar Missiue & Responsiue & Altri Fiori de Ornati par Lamenti / Composta per Bartolomeo Miniatore ... From the Collections at the Library of Congress

=== Secondary literature ===
- Bernuzzi, Marco. "Cristoforo Landino," in Contemporaries of Erasmus. Eds. Thomas B. Deutscher and Peter G. Bietenholz. Toronto: University of Toronto Press, 2003.
- Foà, Simona (2004). "Landino, Cristofor". Dizionario Biografico degli Italiani (in Italian). Vol. 63: Labroca–Laterza. Rome: Institute of the Italian Encyclopaedia. pp. 428–433. ISBN 978-88-12-00032-6.
- Gilson, Simon A. "Tradition and Innovation in Cristoforo Landino's Glosses on Astrology in His Comento sopra la comedia (1481)," Italian Studies, 58 (2003), 48–74.
- McNair, Bruce. Cristoforo Landino: His Works and Thought. Leiden: Brill, 2019.
- Pieper, Christoph. Elegos redolere Vergiliosque sapere: Cristoforo Landinos "Xandra" zwischen Liebe und Gesellschaft. Noctes Neolatinae Bd. 8. Hildesheim: Olms, 2008. xx, 356 S.
