= Andrea Cambini =

Italian historian, humanist and writer

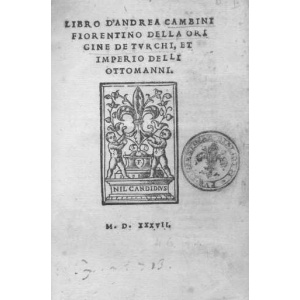
- cover of Cambini's book
- Born: 1445 or 1460
- Died: 1527; Florence
- Other name: Andreas Cambinus
- Occupation: historian
- Known for: being an author of the famous early work on Ottoman Empire

Andrea Cambini or Andreas Cambinus (1445/1460—1527) was an Italian historian, humanist and writer.

== Works on Ottomans ==
Cambini was the author of an early history of the Ottoman Empire, the Commentario de Andrea Cambini fiorentino della origine de turchi, et imperio della casa Ottomanna, which was published in 1529, two years after his death in Florence in 1527. By 1541, Cambini's book had been reissued several times.

Cambini was a pupil of fellow humanist Cristoforo Landino. Since Cambini had never traveled outside Italy, he wrote his work on the Ottomans by relying on older sources from around Western Europe.

Cambini belonged to a group of sixteenth-century Italian historians, which included Paolo Giovio and Giovanni Menavino. They openly praised the Ottoman's organization and behavior and his work sparked interest in the origin of the Ottoman dynasty. In his work, he rejected a theory that the Ottomans were descendants of the Trojans. Cambini followed the fashion of other contemporary historical works and wrote a history of the Ottomans, focused on the personality of the Ottoman sultans and on the military events of their reigns.

== Use of his works by other contemporary authors ==
Some authors had considered the work of Christophe Richer on the Fall of Constantinople to be the account of an eyewitness (an otherwise unknown Riccherio), but it was later discovered that it was actually the work of Richer himself, who based his narration of the event on the work of several previous historians, including Cambini. Cambini's work remains a valuable source of information on the siege as his sources included the testimonies of survivors.

In 1562, John Shute translated the works of Cambini and Paolo Giovio into English and composed a tract on them (Two very notable commentaries: The one of the original of the Turcks and the empire of the house of Ottomanno, and the other of the warre of the Turcke against George Scanderbeg).
