= The Stone Clinic =

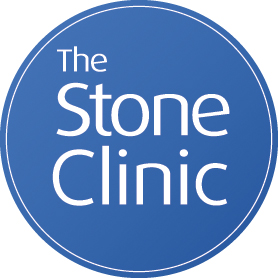
- Company type: sports medicine clinic
- Industry: Healthcare: Orthopaedics
- Founded: San Francisco, CA, U.S. (1988)
- Founder: Kevin R. Stone, MD
- Headquarters: San Francisco, CA, U.S.
- Area served: worldwide
- Divisions: orthopaedic medicine, physical therapy, radiology
- Website: www.stoneclinic.com

The Stone Clinic is a sports medicine clinic in San Francisco, California, offering orthopaedic surgery and medical care, physical therapy and rehabilitation, and radiology imaging services. The Stone Clinic was founded by Kevin R. Stone, M.D., an orthopaedic surgeon, combining himself with a team of nurses, physical therapists, imaging specialists, and patient coordinators, in 1988 to focus on caring for injured athletes and people experiencing arthritis pain.

== Overview ==
The Stone Clinic is founded on the goal of rehabilitating all patients to an operating level higher than before they were injured. The Stone Clinic specializes in sports medicine and injury treatment of knee, shoulder, and ankle joints. Stone has lectured and is recognized internationally as an authority on cartilage and meniscal growth, replacement, and repair.

Stone and the Stone Clinic are known for the development of the paste grafting surgical technique in 1991, combined with meniscus replacement, which are biologic joint replacement procedures for the regeneration of the knee joint.

Surgical procedures were subjected to rigorous outcomes analysis with the results reported in peer reviewed journals. The surgical techniques have been taught to surgeons in the US and worldwide, through lectures and videos.

== Activities ==
Nursing students, medical students, residents, fellows, and other physicians from various institutions around the world, rotate through The Stone Clinic and mentor with Stone. The Stone Clinic hosts the annual Meniscus Transplantation Study Group Meeting as well as the annual Professional Women Athlete's Career Conference.

== See also ==
- Rushton Clinic
