= Martinus Richter =

German surgeon

Martinus Richter is a German orthopaedic surgeon, and Associate Professor at the Hannover Medical School and Head of the Department for Foot and Ankle Surgery Nuremberg and Rummelsberg at the Hospital Rummelsberg and Sana-Hospital Nuremberg.

== Clinical and scientific contribution ==
In the scientific field, Richter and his team developed a score for diagnosing and tracking foot and ankle conditions.

Richter developed a form of pedography for force and pressure measurement that can be used during operations to assess mechanical function.

He developed a form of computer assisted surgery for foot and ankle corrections.

He has run clinical trials on a variation of articular cartilage stem cell paste grafting to treat cartilage defects in feet and ankles.

He also developed several implants for foot and ankle surgery.

== Awards ==
- 2009 Leonard J. Goldner Award der American Orthopaedic Foot and Ankle Society (AOFAS) at the 25th Annual Summer Meeting, Vancouver, Canada, 2009
