= Consolidated Works =

Coordinates: 47°37′25″N 122°20′07″W

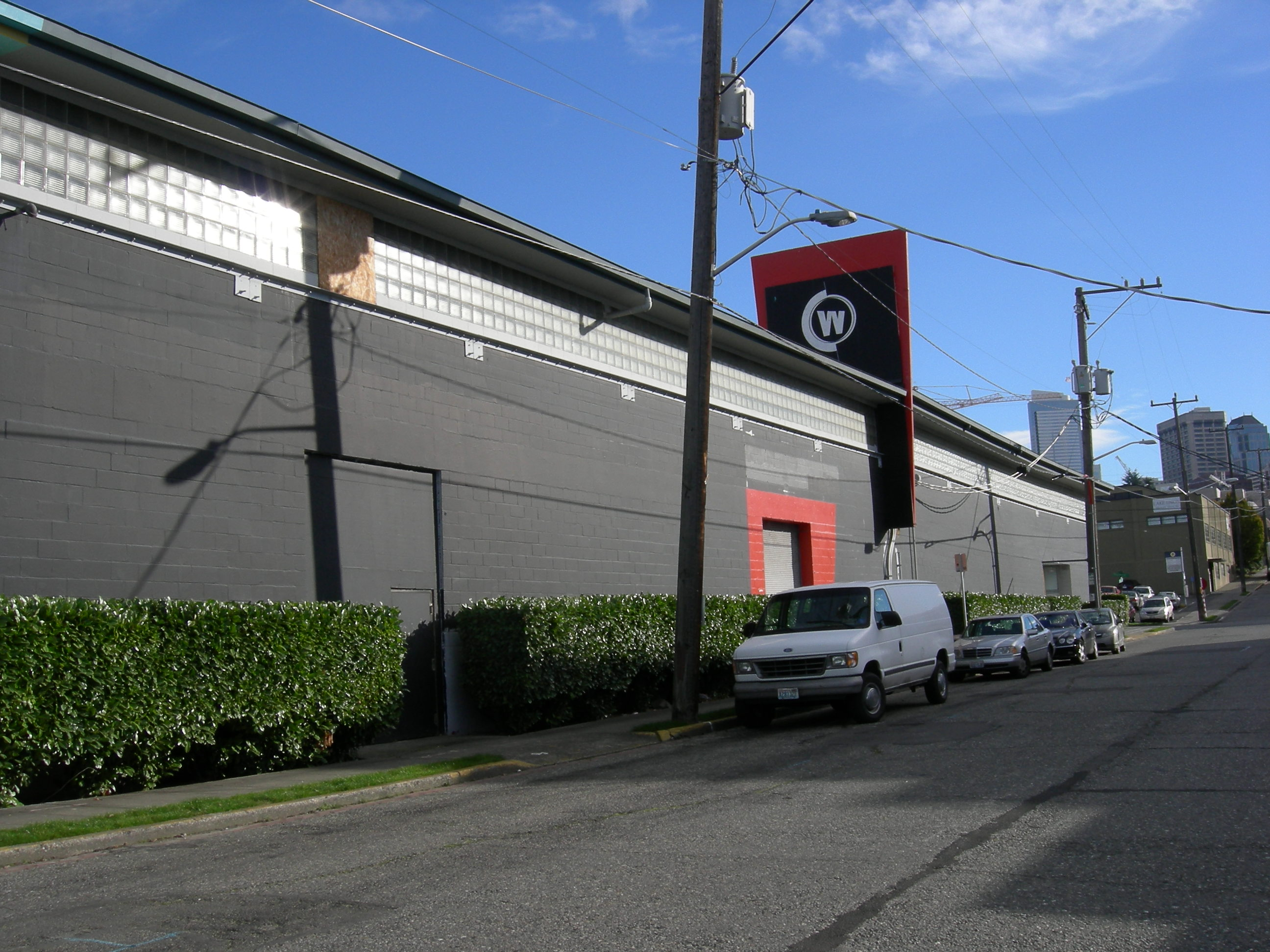
The second and last site of the now-closed Consolidated Works, 500 Boren Avenue North, corner of Boren and Republican, Seattle. Photographed 2007.

Consolidated Works was a "multi-disciplinary contemporary arts center" located successively in two former warehouses in the South Lake Union neighborhood of Seattle, Washington, USA, just west of what would be considered the Cascade neighborhood within South Lake Union. It incorporated an art gallery, theater, cinema, and music/dance/lecture hall, as well as studio spaces for artists and a bar and lounge.

== Opening and temporary premises ==
The center was founded in 1997 by Matthew Richter. Richter had previously worked at Seattle's alternative newspaper The Stranger as theatre editor. Funding came from grants, donations, and corporate sponsorship, and The Stranger also agreed to provide advertising for events at ConWorks in exchange for storage space at its warehouse. Richter became the center's Executive Director, with Meg Shiffler becoming Director of Visual Art until 2003.

The center opened in 1999, working from temporary premises on Terry Avenue for three years. ConWorks' renovated facility at 500 Boren Avenue North opened on 13 September 2002. The refit of the 35,000 sq ft (3,300 m^{2}) warehouse, built in 1948, cost almost half a million dollars.

== Mission statement ==
Consolidated Works' aim was to give all the art forms equal billing - to be "neither a theater with art in the lobby nor a gallery with a stage in back. It is not supposed to be a cinema that plays music or a music hall that shows films". To this end, the billing of Consolidated Works focuses on high-profile artists like Andy Warhol alongside emerging talent, primarily from the Pacific Northwest. Consolidated Works has a policy of encouraging young creative professionals, including an Artist-in-Residence program.

As well as mounting its own productions and exhibitions, the center also hosted touring events - for example, the Curiously Strong contemporary art program (sponsored by Altoids) and the popular 14/48 theater show (where 14 short plays are written and produced in 48 hours, begun in 1997). Richter's vision was one of experimentalism, and he argued that "if the quality of the programming was always of a strong finished caliber, then we weren't doing our job right".

== Restructuring in 2005 ==
On February 8, 2005, the board of Consolidated Works dismissed Richter, the co-founder and executive director. The president of the board, Robb Krieg, did not reveal the reasons for the firing.

Richter's dismissal caused consternation in the Seattle arts community. A 36-signature petition was presented to the board, signed by senior figures in other local institutions, and all of ConWorks' creative staff resigned.

In September 2005 the board announced that Corey Pearlstein, a producer with a performing arts background had been named to the position. At the time of this writing, the company was preparing to open a major world premiere by Seattle-based, internationally known kinetic sculptor Trimpin.

From The Stranger, July 29: "[Conworks] announced that it would not renew its lease with Vulcan, Inc. because (a) the building requires seismic improvements and (b) Vulcan 'will require a nine-month exit clause to permit it to develop our South Lake Union lot if an opportunity arises.' ConWorks has begun looking for new accommodations."

== Closure in 2006 ==
On December 7, 2006, the Seattle Times reported that ConWorks would close by the end of the year.
