= Johann Heinrich Zorn =

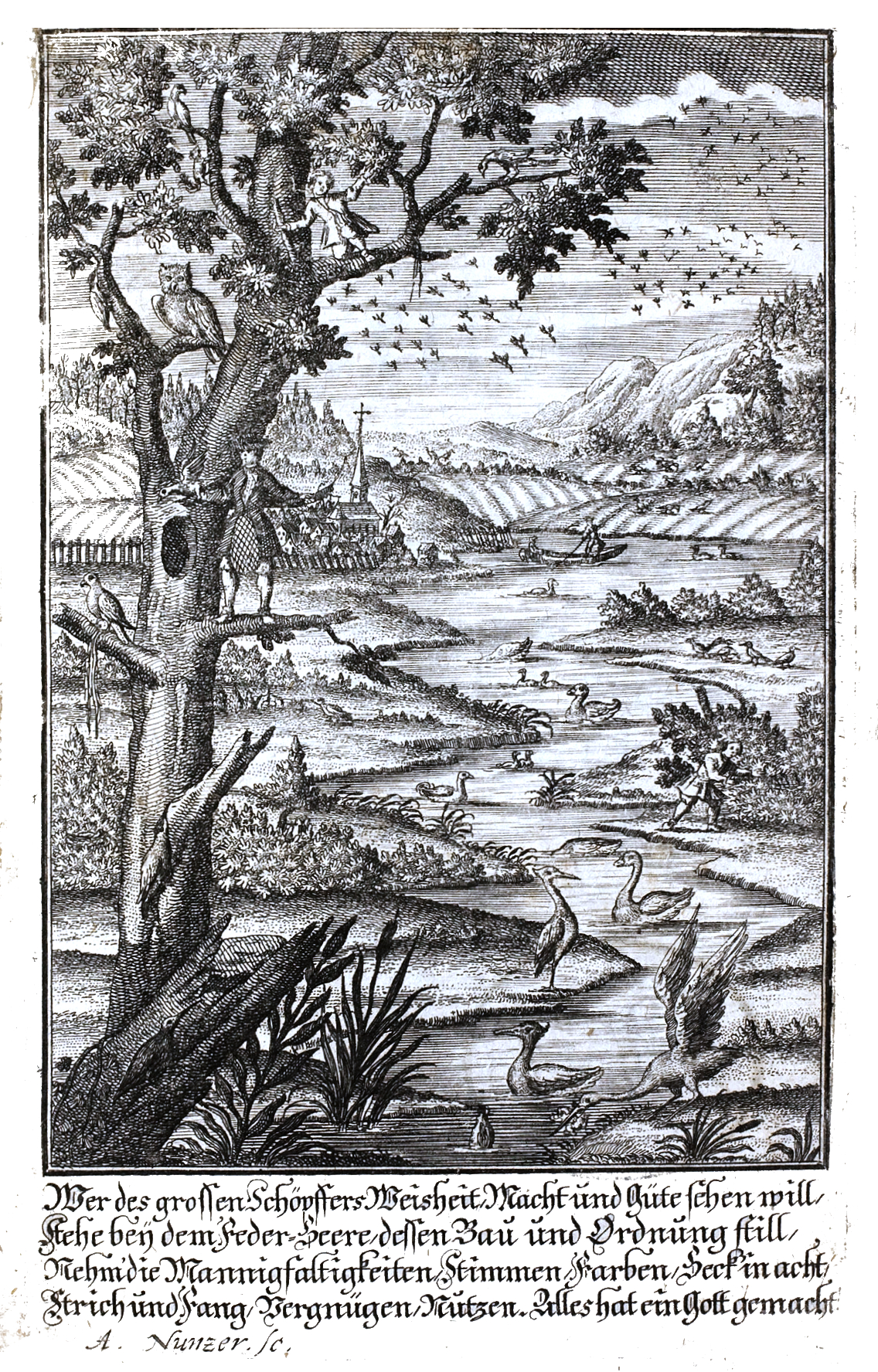
Frontispiece from Petino-Theologie, the man holding a bird and pointing to the church may be a representation of the author

Johann Heinrich Zorn (4 February 1698 – 15 August 1748) was a Protestant pastor and ornithologist. Following the philosophy of natural or physico-theology he wrote a two volume work entitled Petino-Theologie oder Versuch, Die Menschen durch nähere Betrachtung Der Vögel Zur Bewunderung Liebe und Verehrung ihres mächtigsten, weissest- und gütigsten Schöpffers aufzumuntern (1742–1743). This can be translated as "Ornitho-theology, or an encouragement to humanity, through a careful observation of birds, towards admiration, love and respect for their powerful, of the wise and good Creator." His work inspired other books including the "Ichthyotheologie" by Johann Gottfried Ohnefalsch Richter (1703–1765). He had planned another work called Melissotheologie dealing with bees and theology.

== Life and work ==
Zorn was born in Bieswang near Pappenheim and educated in philosophy at Altdorf (1716) and Jena (1717) before becoming a vicar in Biensweng from 1723. He then served as a pastor in Bavaria. Zorn who was heavily influenced by the work, far ahead of its time, of the ornithologist Ferdinand Johann Adam von Pernau (1660–1731), and aimed to proclaim the divine power to his readers. His comments are very fair, and he is one of the first to observe the role of the colour of birds or eggs in their camouflage. He played a significant role in the dissemination of information on bird behavior in Germany although scientific ethological did not advance much until the 20th century. His motivation for first-hand observation however lay in the idea that God revealed Himself in the book of nature and that an investigation of birds would lead to an admiration. In the first volume he examined how the physical structure and the suitability to specific lifestyles indicated intelligent design. He then examined nest building, eggs, and migration. He wrote that migrating birds had a moral lesson in that the earth was not theirs forever and that one must do God's work while one is here. Zorn claimed that the pagan Egyptians worshipped birds and waged wars for their sake. Zorn noted the role of insectivorous birds in pest reduction. He also used an example population calculation of a bird with six chicks growing by geometrical progression over generations.

== Other sources ==
- Michael Walters (2003). A Concise History of Ornithology, Yale University Press (New Haven, Connecticut): 255 p. ISBN 0-300-09073-0
