= Articular cartilage stem cell paste grafting =

Medical procedure

Cartilage repair techniques are the current focus of large amounts of research. Many different strategies have been proposed as solutions for cartilage defects. Surgical techniques currently being studied include:

- bone marrow stimulation
- osteochondral autograft transplantation
- osteochondral allograft transplantation
- autologous chondrocyte implantation
- cell-based (using chondrocytes or stem-cells) or acellular scaffolding

Articular cartilage stem cell paste grafting is another technique in use and is undergoing continued investigation.

== Background ==
Articular cartilage is a connective tissue overlying the ends of bones that provides smooth joint surfaces. Healthy cartilage is essential to the proper functioning of joints within the body.

Cartilage is composed of cells embedded in an extracellular matrix of collagen fibers and proteoglycans. It contains no blood vessels therefore its cells are dependent upon diffusion for the supply of oxygen and nutrients. Its intrinsic healing capacity is low. Injury to cartilage can lead to pain and stiffness and is the precursor to the development of osteoarthritis (degenerative joint arthritis).

== History ==
Articular cartilage stem cell paste grafting was initially described by Kevin R. Stone M.D., a San Francisco-based orthopedic surgeon, in 1997 . The technique was devised in response to reports that many of the contemporary cartilage restoration procedures lead to the development of fibrocartilage, not true hyaline articular cartilage. Knowing that fibrocartilage was not as durable as articular cartilage and that its formation yielded only short term clinical benefits, Stone proposed his paste grafting as a means of regenerating hyaline-like cartilage. The hypothesis was that harvesting a mixture of articular cartilage and cancellous bone would combine pluripotent cells of the cancellous bone with cartilage extracellular matrix and growth factors and when exposed to continuous motion, hyaline-like cartilage would be stimulated to form.

== Surgical Procedure ==
Published descriptions of the articular cartilage stem cell paste grafting technique are readily available. The procedure is performed in an outpatient setting under general anesthesia. The surgical steps are summarized here:

- The lesion is cleared of loose or fibrillated cartilage
- The base of the lesion is penetrated with an arthroscopic awl it is entirely morselized
- Tissue for grafting is harvested using a trephine that is impacted into the margin of the articular cartilage and underlying cancellous bone at the medial border of the lateral femoral condyle
- The trephine is removed and the articular cartilage and cancellous bone is morselized in a graft impactor
- The graft paste is re-loaded into the trephine and impacted into the fractured bed of the chondral defect
- The paste graft is held in place for 1 to 2 minutes

Postoperatively, patients are requested to use a continuous passive motion machine for 6 hours a night for 4 weeks. If the defect is in a weight-bearing region, weight-bearing is restricted for 4 weeks. A guided physical therapy program begins on postoperative day 1.

== Results ==
In a 2 to 12 year follow-up of 125 patients, pain, functioning, and activity measures improved in 82% of patients. Eighteen of the 125 patients (14.4%) were considered failures. Histologically, 42 of 66 (63.6%) of biopsies showed strong evidence of replacement of their articular surface, and 18 of 66 biopsies (27.3%) showed development of normal looking hyaline cartilage.

== Advantages ==
Paste grafting is a relatively simple surgical procedure that can be performed in an outpatient setting. It requires minimal special instrumentation. Unexpected lesions can be treated. No tissue culture or foreign matrices are required. Paste grafting has been an effective salvage procedure for failed microfracture, failed Osteochondral Autograph Transplant Surgery (OATS) or Mosaicplasty procedures, Carticel and TruFit procedures. Compared to the cost of other complex cartilage restoration procedures, the cost of paste grafting is minimal. Disadvantages include limited experience with patella paste grafting and it remains difficult to access the very far posterior lesions.
