= Richter (electro rock) =

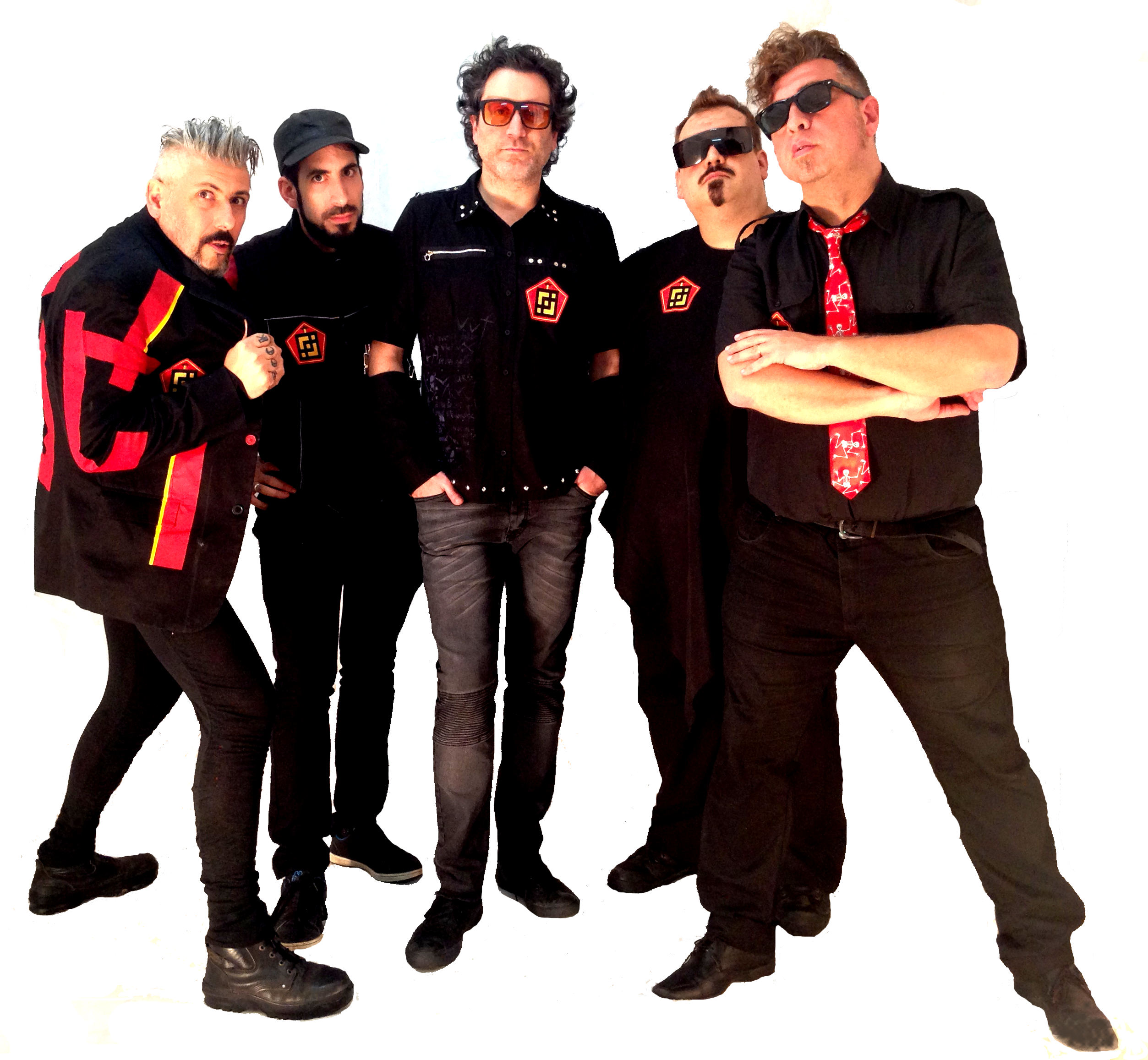

Background information
- Origin: Argentina, Buenos Aires
- Genre: Electronic rock
- Years active: 1999–present
- Labels: Loshe; El Cuzco; Undertecno
- Members: Zenitram; Gustavo Scheller; John John; Nan; Daniel Balza
- Website: RichterNet – official website

Richter is an electronic rock band from Buenos Aires, Argentina.

== History ==
=== The Beginning ===
Richter was founded in 1999 by bassist Gustavo Scheller (ex Los Paganos) and keyboardist Nan (ex Rahez), with drummer JD5, singer Capi Sands, replaced a few months later by singer and electronic musician Zenitram, and guitarist Tano Suarez, replaced by John John after he left the band in 2003. In 2000 the band was highlighted by their show in the TV program "Volver Rock" with Ilya Kuryaki & The Valderramas, in Users Magazine's MP3 II Compilation with some of their first demos, and in Tower Records's Pulse Magazine, that considered them one of the most promising bands in Argentina. A demo tape in 1999 and an EP in 2000 anticipated some of the tracks later included in their first album.

=== Epicentro ===
In 2001 the band released their debut album "Epicentro", with 13 tracks including "Universo Kelper", "Cien Mil Espinas", "Dagobah Disco", "Babel", and the promotional single "Ciudad Satélite", Richter's first music video, directed by Ezequiel Berra. "Ciudad Satélite" entered rotation on main Argentine music channels. In November, the band performed live "Epicentro" in the official album presentation at a sold-out YMCA Theatre in Buenos Aires, starting what it was called the "Gira Satélite" (Satellite Tour), with more than 90 shows in Buenos Aires, Santa Fé and the Atlantic Coast all along 2002 and 2003.

During this years, the band collaborated in several tribute albums: to Los Fabulosos Cadillacs with their version of "Galapagos" (2001), to Madonna in Spanish, with a version of "Justify My Love" (2001), to Los Brujos with "Canción del Cronopio" (2002) and to Los Peligrosos Gorriones with "Por Tres Monedas" (2002). In 2003 they produced a powerful version of "A Question of Time" for the Argentine tribute to Depeche Mode "South Celebration", acclaimed by Latin American and European critics. Richter's version would be later included in European compilation "A Metal Tribute to Depeche Mode 5" (2008).

=== Planetas Planos ===
Richter's second record, "Planetas Planos", released in early 2004 by the Argentine label Polígono Sónico was actually a 6 track mini album, including their first radial hit "Televidente", performed live in Mario Pergolini's Cual Es? program, on Rock & Pop FM, one of the most prestigious radios in Argentina.

The new material went deeper in the integration between distorted guitars and electronic grooves. Communication, media and message became the album core concept, represented by the idea of the antenna in the cover art. The music video for "Televidente" featured the band as a kind of orange-dressed commando team that went around the city delivering banners with the iconic cover art antenna.

"El Enemigo Duerme en Casa", "Nunca Me Vas a Entender","A lo Lejos" y "Amapola" showed the most dark, pop and punk influences of all Richter's music so far.

Live performances during the "Gira Interplanetaria" (Interplanetary Tour) (2004–2005) made the band be rewarded with critical acclaim as one of the most important rising artists in the country. They performed in a band-special emission of the program "Cultura Cero" on Channel 7, where they anticipated tracks of their next album "Danzallamas".

=== Danzallamas and the "Danzallamas Tour" ===
"Danzallamas", Richter's third record, released in September 2005 by Polígono Sónico label, and re-released two years later by the Argentine-Mexican label Loshe Music with two bonus tracks, represented a step ahead in the band sound, lyrics and aesthetics.

The new material extended Richter's spectrum to new styles, daring to unexplored rhythms and atmospheres, and deepened the most edgy, forceful and radical side of the rock and electronics mixture, with more aggressive guitars over more compact sequences. The melodies and the power of the sound were combined with the acid poetry of the lyrics, full of sophisticated irony, paper icons, selfishness, destructive modernism, lack of common sense. The concepts of game and danger, reflected in the cover art, stayed all along the album.

The music video for promotional single "Casa Fantasma", an acid critic to yellow press, entered rotation on the most important Latin American and Argentine TV channels. And "Te Vas a Berlin", second video from the album, represented a step ahead in Richter's visuals, with careful, dark and futuristic aesthetics.

Also "El País de Maradona", "La Virgen de la Pasarela", "Kill" and "Caso Escaso" became classics in the band's performances, highly celebrated by the audience.

In 2007, the album re-release for Latin America included two bonus tracks: a remix of "Casa Fantasma", and the previously unreleased "Libre de Culpa y Cargo", with El Otro Yo's Cristian Aldana in vocals. The music video for this song became the third single from the album, and it also featured Cristian Aldana, along with the band, in one of their most punk and psychedelic releases. It was the first Richter video directed by Guillermo Tello.

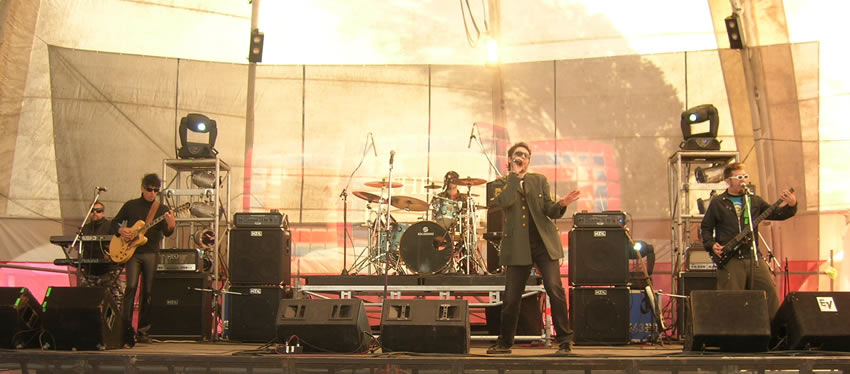

Simultaneously with the album original release, the band started their most ambitious tour so far. The "Gira Danzallamas" (Danzallamas Tour), with 101 concerts all around Argentina, and for the first time, also in Uruguay, including the official album presentation at Auditorio BAUEN of Buenos Aires, on 19 November 2005, and explosive shows in Baradero Rock 2005, Pepsi Music 2007 and 40 Years of the Argentine Rock festivals.

In 2006, the band also produced their own version of "Cosas Mías" for the tribute compilation to Miguel Abuelo "Quiero Ser Abuelo". They performed the song live at Centro Cultural Borges, in Buenos Aires, on occasion of the official tribute presentation.

=== Fin del Mundo, the "To the End of the World Tour" and "Cuentakilometros" DVD ===
Fin del Mundo, released in September 2008, was Richter's fourth album and the first to be released simultaneously in all Latin America by the Argentine-Mexican label Loshe Music.

Recorded at Panda and Orion studios (Buenos Aires) by the experienced engineers Martín Russo and Pablo Rabinovich, and produced by Zenitram with the collaboration of Diego Vainer, the new release deepened the unique sound that had become the band trade mark: rock, electronics and dance songs with acid lyrics.

Darker than the previous album, and with a higher presence of synthesizers, effects and electronic sequences, Fin del Mundo represented a kind of confluence to Richter's essence, an acid, ironic and paradoxical combination of extremes, from party to sorrow. With a rather futuristic and apocalyptic concept, the double sense of the album name ("End of the World"), as "end of times" and also referring to the geographical position of Argentina in the map, wrapped intriguing lyrics that called to celebration among defeat, confusion, decadence and marginality.

The two first singles from the album, "Corte de Luz" and "Retro-80" are clear examples of this concept line, as well as "Knock-Out", "Jíbaros", "Bon Vivant" or "País Subtropical". At the same time, "Papparazzi/Violador", "Kriptonita" and "Sol de Medianoche" were acclaimed by the audience. "Retro-80" would be released in late 2009 as a cassette-single with a version of Vox Dei's "Las Guerras" as B side. This strange format (in line with the track name) was highlighted for its originality by the most important Argentine music critics.

"Corte de Luz" music video, an ironic celebration of the chaos during a black out, filmed in the streets of Bragado city, in Buenos Aires province, entered heavy rotation on the most important Latin American and Argentine music channels. And "Retro-80", a bizarre performance of the band on an old fashioned TV program, included the first incursion of digital animation in Richter's videography. Both were directed by Guillermo Tello.

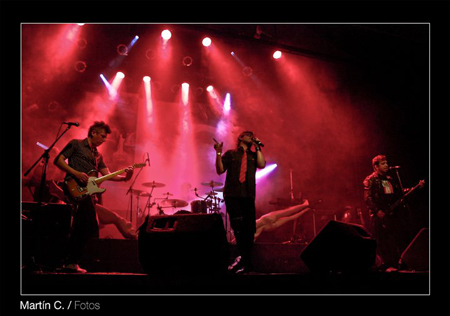

The "Gira Hasta el Fin del Mundo" (Tour to the End of the World) performing the album, became the largest national tour ever undertaken by an electro-rock band, reaching more than 50 cities, and up to 40.000 km from Salta to Ushuaia and from the Atlantic Coast and Uruguay to Mendoza, including a performance at Cosquín Rock 2009 festival, and two shows at Niceto Club (Buenos Aires) supporting German electro-pop legends Camouflage.

The "Cuentakilometros (Girando Hasta el Fin del Mundo)" DVD, released in October 2011, was conceived as a documentary about the tour, featuring several interviews, live shots and backstage testimonies, and included the tour-inspired "Paparazzi / Violador" music video (third single from "Fin del Mundo", directed by Maria Paz Caldarone and Federico Roitberg) as promotional clip. The DVD also featured the band's complete videography and two previously unreleased bonus tracks: "Hotel de Inmigrantes" and "La Chacra y la Mugre", originally recorded during the "Fin del Mundo" sessions.

All along this period, the band continued to participate in different tributes: at the beginning of 2010, their version of Vox Dei's "Las Guerras" (the same that was released the previous year as "Retro-80"'s cassette-single b-side), was included in the 9-disc box set "Una Celebracion del Rock Argentino" (An Argentine Rock Celebration) by legendary Litto Nebbia's label Melopea Discos, with the support of Argentine National Secretary of Culture. And in 2011, Richter's version of Virus's "El Probador" was released by "Arde Rock & Roll" magazine in its tribute CD "Rock en tu Forma de Ser".

=== Transformador, the "Transforma-Tour" and "Transforma2" ===
During 2011, the band went into the studio again to record and produce "Transformador", their fifth album, released in April 2012.

The album, recorded at El Cuzco studios, in the west of Greater Buenos Aires, was in the band's own words "The most rocker album from Richter, and the most techno as well, that is, the most electro-rocker one. Guitar riffs and bass patterns come from the rock and roll origins, and from punk. Programming is aggressive, inspired in EBM, industrial and techno-pop. Even if it is a double album, Transformador is a fast album, fast and sharp. In Fin del Mundo and Danzallamas Richter deployed all the cutlery, in Transformador we only used the knife".

Lyrics in "Transformador" became rawer and more complainant, following the album's sound concept, more aggressive, acid and ironic than its predecessor, highlighting situations of failure and breakage, family dysfunctions and social crisis of the system.

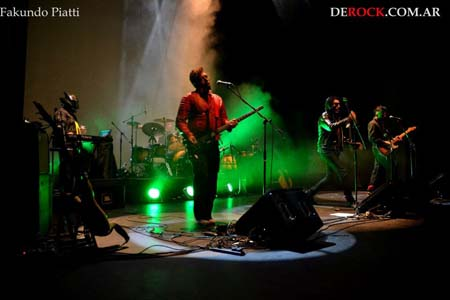

The album also included the first cover song in Richter's discography: a version of Gary Numan's "Cars", a tribute to an age that deeply influenced the band during the composition of "Transformador": the late 1970s and early 1980s, the new wave, the post-punk and the beginning of electro-pop.

Anticipating the forthcoming album, the music video for "Arbol de la Ciencia", the first single, entered in heavy rotation in main music TV channels in Argentina, and was premiered in Richter's official YouTube channel in January 2012. The clip, produced by renowned director Diego Tucci for Refugio Films, was filmed in the old facilities of SIAM factory, in the south of Greater Buenos Aires, with an esthetic concept that combined modernity and vintage. It also evoked the golden ages of the Argentine industry in the 1950s and 1960s: the abandoned environment of what was one of the most important electric appliances factory in Argentina, and peronist-designed motorcycles and cars. "Arbol de la Ciencia" music video was later followed by the other two singles from "Transformador": "Turra", released in later 2012, also filmed by Refugio Films team in and old fashioned house in Buenos Aires; and "Suiza", in 2014, a surrealist and dark pilgrimage directed by Maria Paz Caldarone, filmed in Newton, a little village 200 km. south of Buenos Aires.

In March 2012, the band started the "Transforma-Tour", a tour that took them again to the entire Argentina, Uruguay, and for the first time Mexico, including outstanding performances at Malvinas Argentinas Stadium (Buenos Aires) supporting Creed, Niceto Club again supporting Camouflage, Vorterix Theatre supporting El Otro Yo, and the Tianguis Cultural del Chopo (Mexico D.F.) The sold-out official album presentation at The Roxy Live (Buenos Aires) on 2 June 2012, was considered by the audience as "the best show in Richter´s history so far".

As a closing for the "Transformador" period, the band released in September 2014, through the brand new label Undertecno, "Transforma2 – Transformador Remixes", a remixes album featuring several versions of "Transformador" tracks, produced by important artists of the Argentine electronic scene like Club Rayo, Cosaquitos en Globo, Tecnoman SF, Lowpez, Sintex Bortexx, Vitraux, Tyvar and more. The new album also included the previously unreleased "Malasangre" as bonus track.

Before the end of the "Transforma-Tour", in early 2015, JD5 left the band, being replaced in drums by Paula Perrella.

=== Richteria and the "Richteria Tour" ===
All along 2015 and 2016, the band undertook the production of its sixth album at El Cuzco (Buenos Aires) and Akut (México D.F.) studios. After more than two years of work, "Richteria" was released by Undertecno label in Argentina in September 2016.

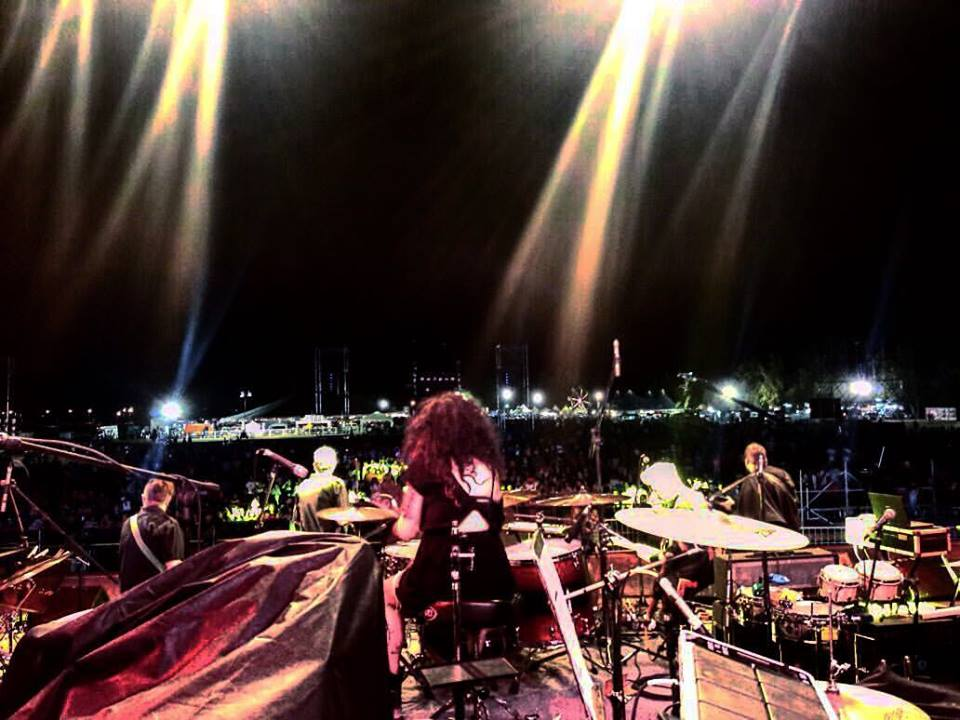

"Richteria" was the most electro-punk album in the band's history, deploying a synthetic, raw, aggressive sound, acid and direct lyrics, and a visual concept with references to third-world retrofuturism, between the bizarre and the paranormal.

In September 2016 the band started the "Richteria Tour", that took them for the first time to Chile, with shows in Valparaíso and Santiago, and important festivals all over Argentina, such as the Rock al Campo (Quiroga), the Rock y Campo (Colon) and the Fiesta de la Confluencia (Neuquén). The album official presentation in Buenos Aires took place on 11 and 12 November 2016, at the Caras y Caretas Theater (San Telmo).

In May 2017 Paula Perrella left the band, being replaced in drums by Daniel Balza. Soon after, the band released the music video for "Gengis Khan", Richteria's first single, directed by Lisandro Peralta and Mareano Van Gelderen.

== Current members ==
- Zenitram (Vocals, Synthesizers and Programming);
- Gustavo Scheller (Bass, Vocals and Programming);
- John John (Guitars and Additional Vocals);
- Nan (Synthesizers and FX);
- Daniel Balza (Drums);

== Discography ==
=== Studio albums ===
- Epicentro (2001);
- Planetas Planos (2004);
- Danzallamas (2005);
- Fin del Mundo (2008);
- Transformador (2012);
- Richteria (2016);

=== Remix albums ===
- Transforma2 – Transformador Remixes (2014);

=== EPs, Singles, Compilations and Demos ===
- Richter (Demo) (1999);
- Richter (EP) (2000);
- Canciones Seleccionadas (MP3 Compilation) (2006);
- Retro-80 (Cassette-Single) (2009);
- Tributos 2001-2009 (MP3 Compilation) (2010);
- Richter (Promotional CD Compilation) (2011);
- Autogestion (Compilado) (2019);

== DVD ==
- Cuentakilómetros (Girando Hasta el Fin del Mundo) (2011)

== Music videos ==
- Ciudad Satélite (2001)
- Televidente (2004)
- Casa Fantasma (2005)
- Te Vas a Berlín (2006)
- Libre de Culpa y Cargo (2007)
- Corte de Luz (2008)
- Retro-80 (2009)
- Paparazzi / Violador (2011)
- Árbol de la Ciencia (2012)
- Turra (2012)
- Suiza (2014)
- Genghis Khan (2017)
- San Cono (2017)
- Paso a Nivel (2018)
- La Puerta de Piria (2018)
- Buenas Noches Humanos (2019)
