= Édouard Frédéric Wilhelm Richter =

French painter (1844–1913)

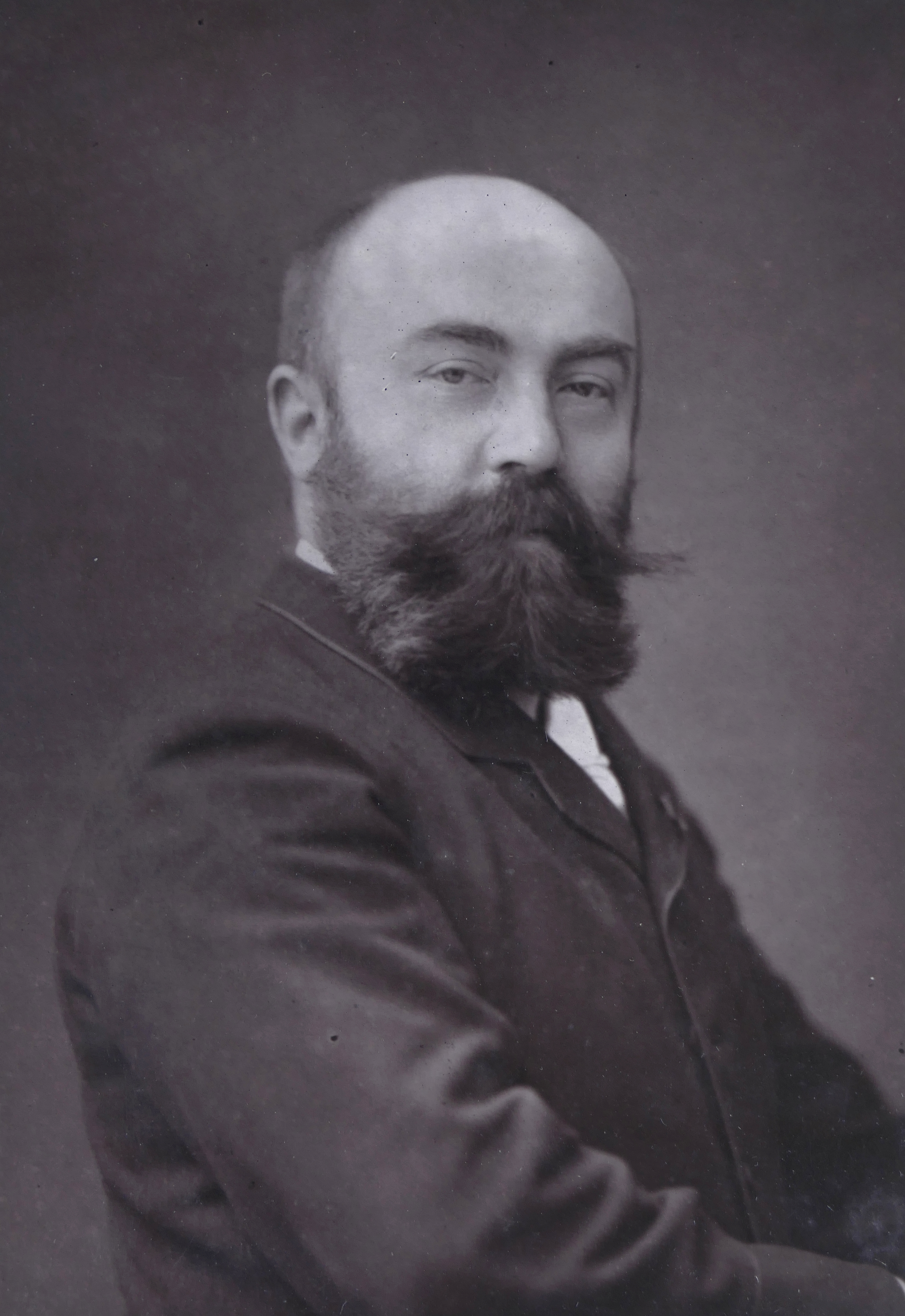
Edouard Richter, 1882

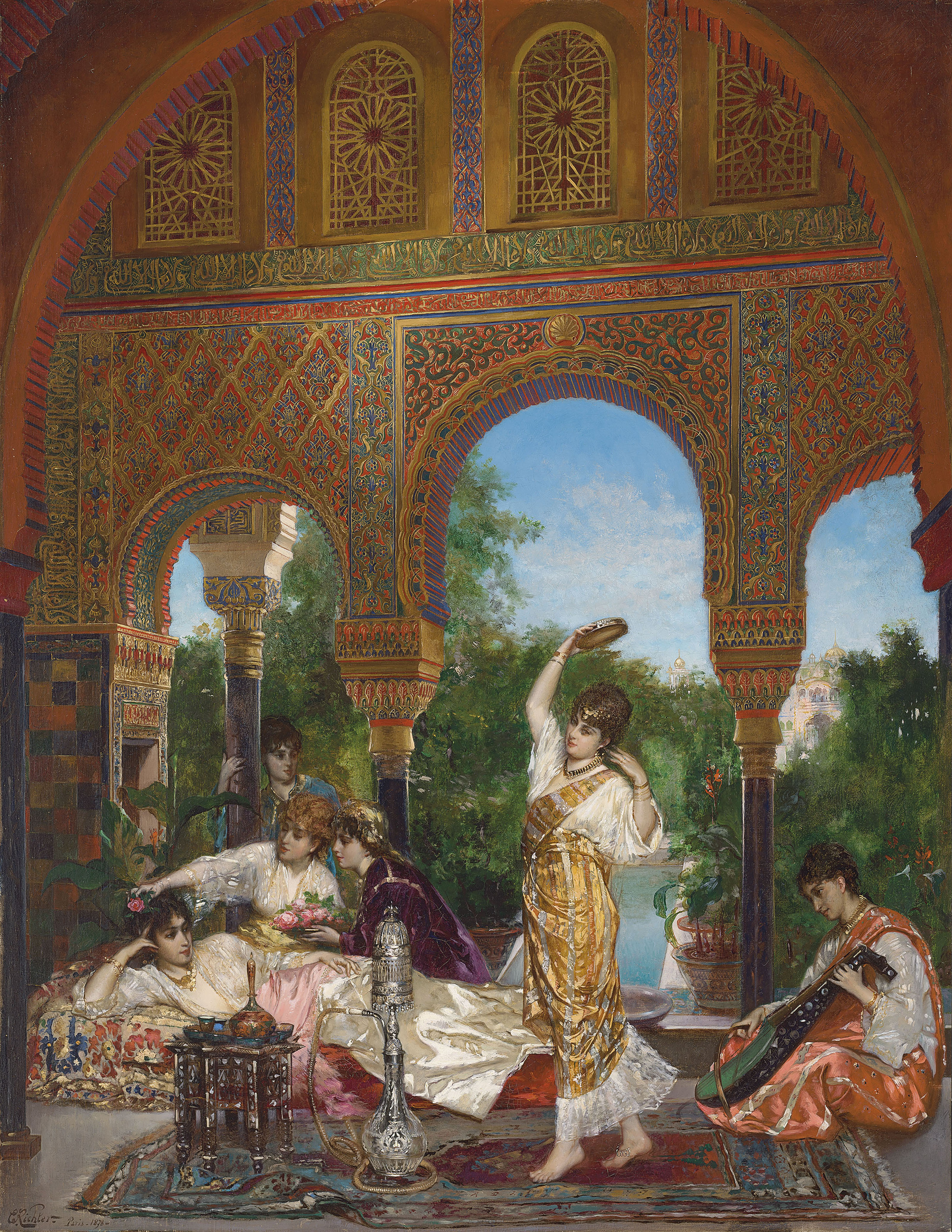
In the Harem

Édouard Frédéric Wilhelm Richter (18 June 1844 – 4 March 1913) was a French painter who specialized in genre and Orientalist scenes.

== Biography ==
He was born and died in Paris. His father was German and his mother was Dutch. He began his artistic studies at the Royal Academy of Art, The Hague, followed by studies at the Académie des Beaux-Arts in Paris with Ernest Hébert and Léon Bonnat.

After completing his studies, he remained in Paris. His first exhibition took place in 1866.

In addition to his popular Orientalist paintings, he produced numerous portraits. Some of his works may be seen at the Musée Baron-Martin.

== Gallery ==
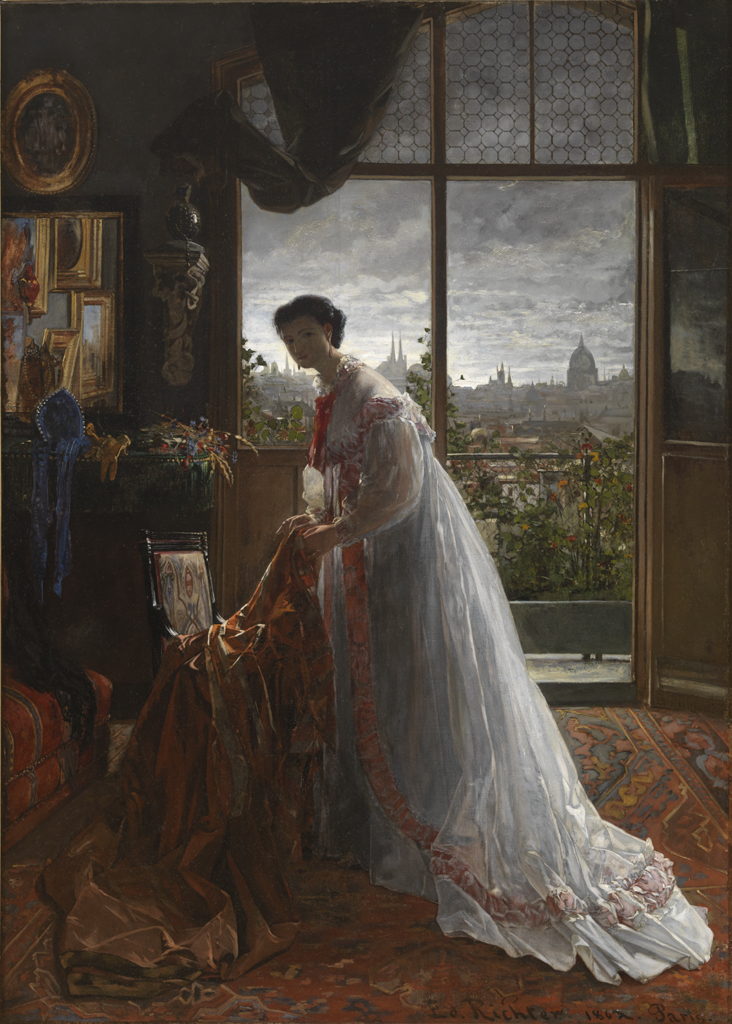
Lady Standing before an Open Window, 1868

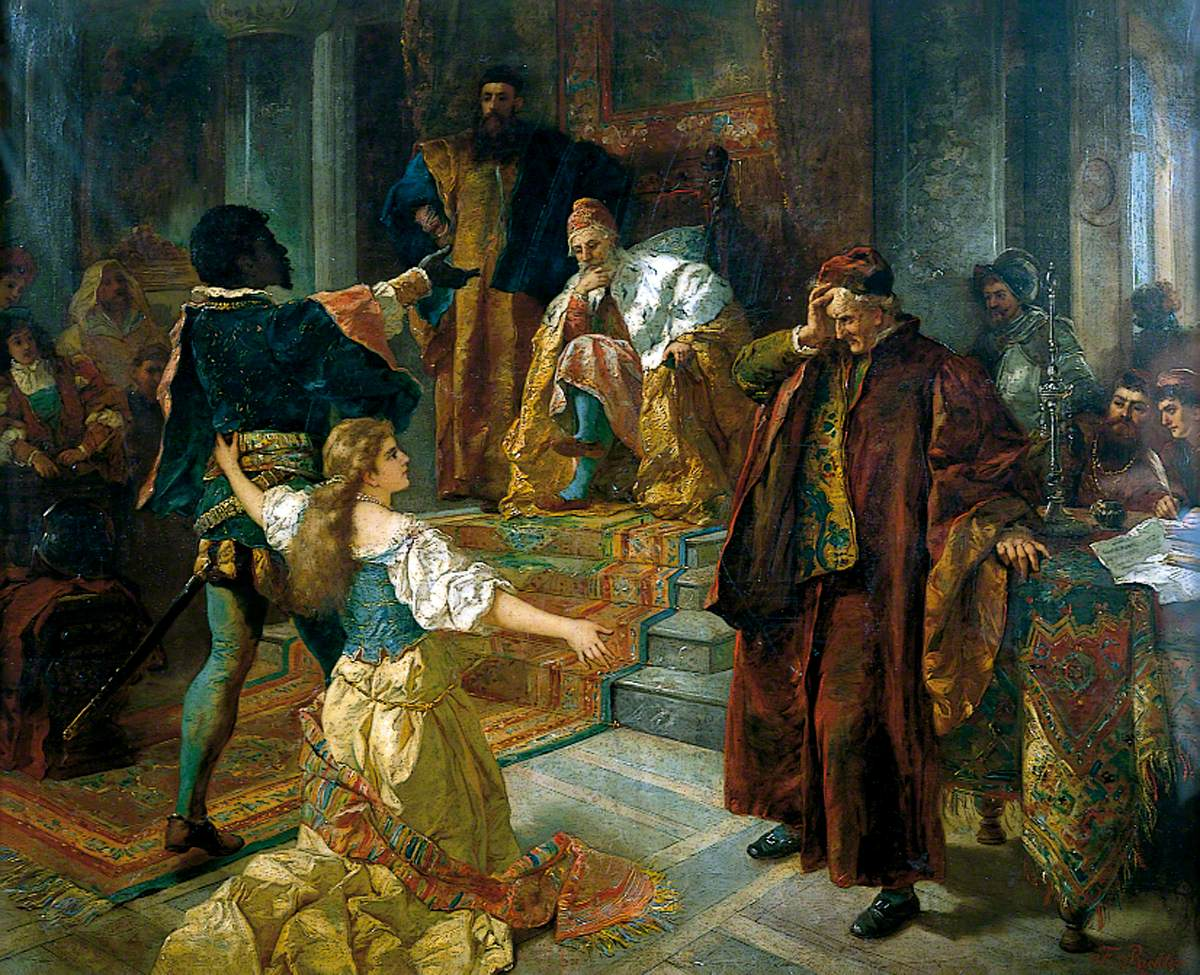
Othello, 1880-1881

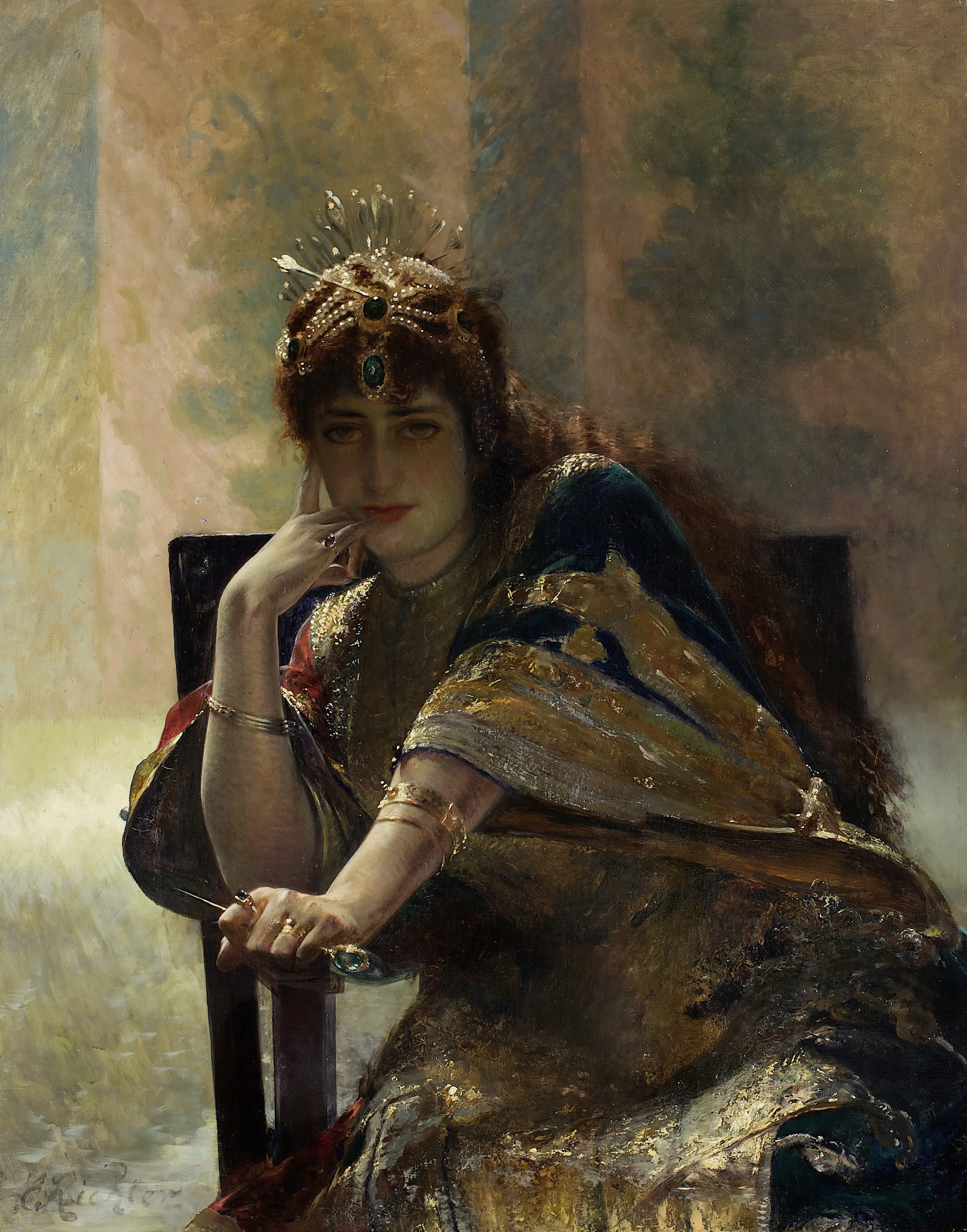
Orientalin, 1875

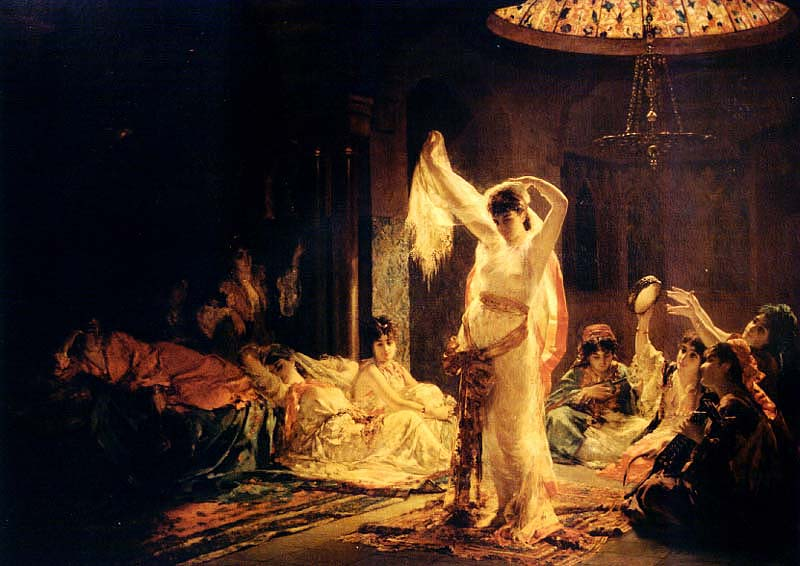
The Sultan's amusement

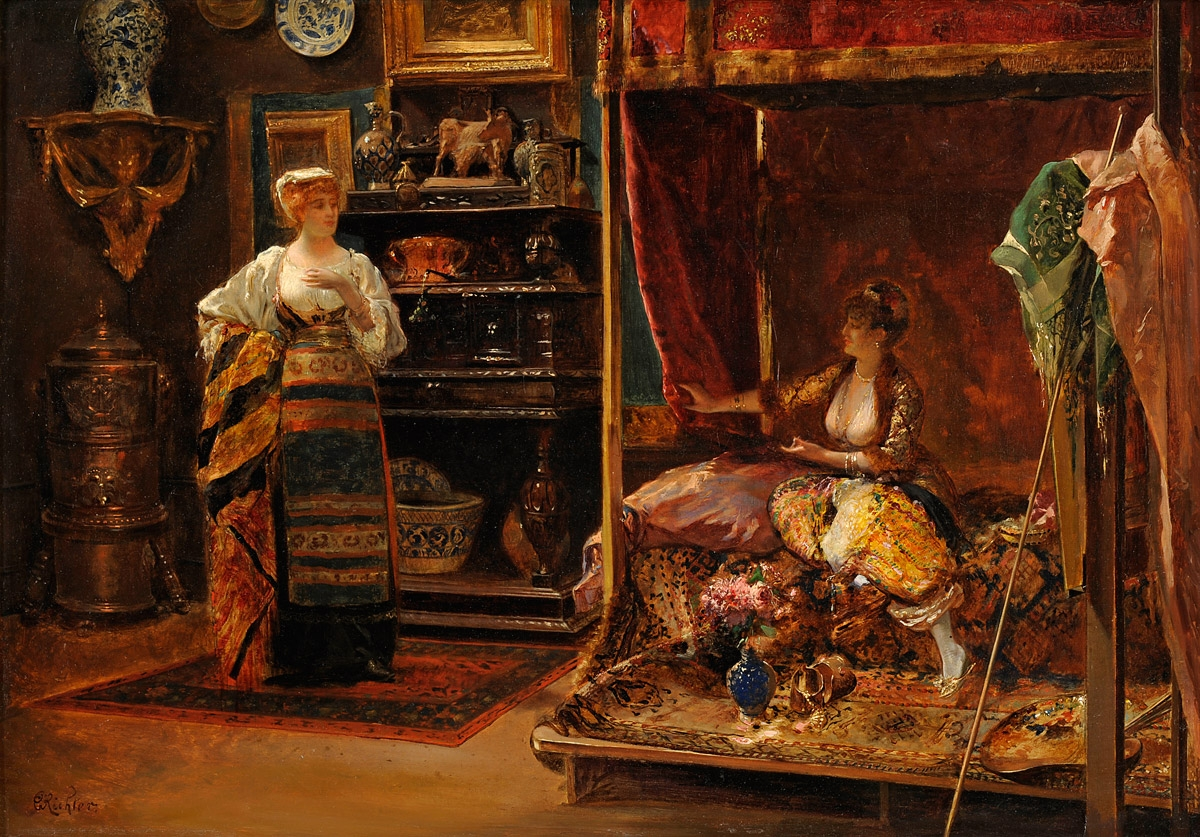
In the artist's studio, 1913

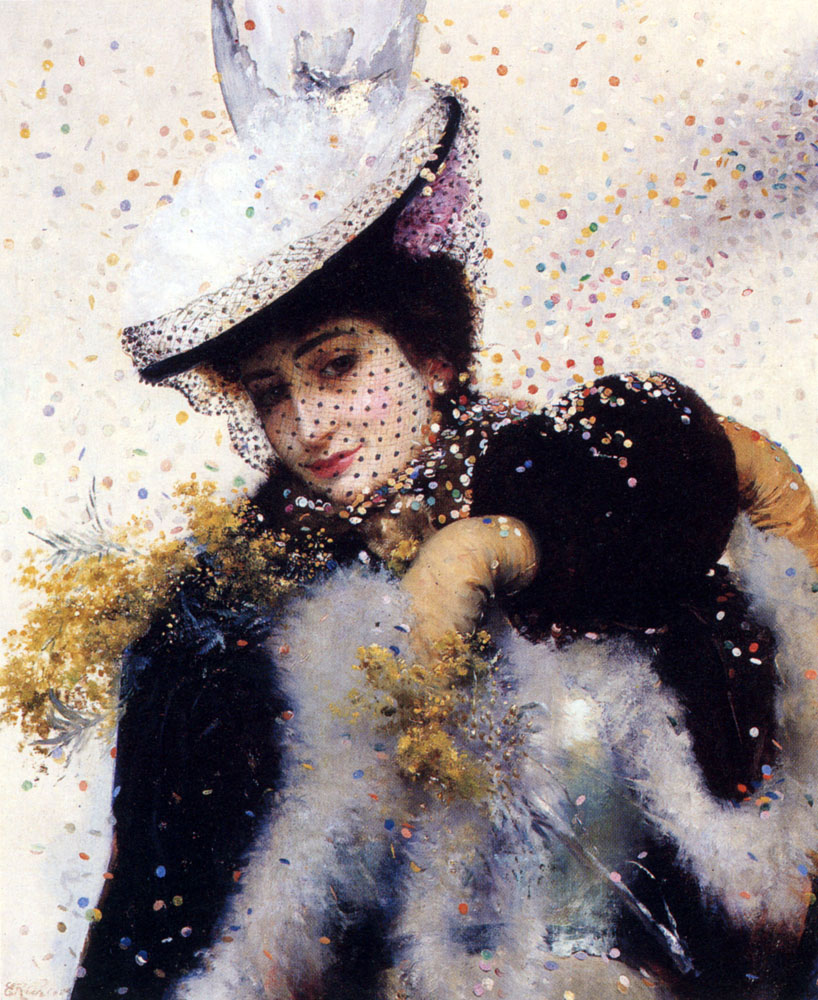
The winter bride

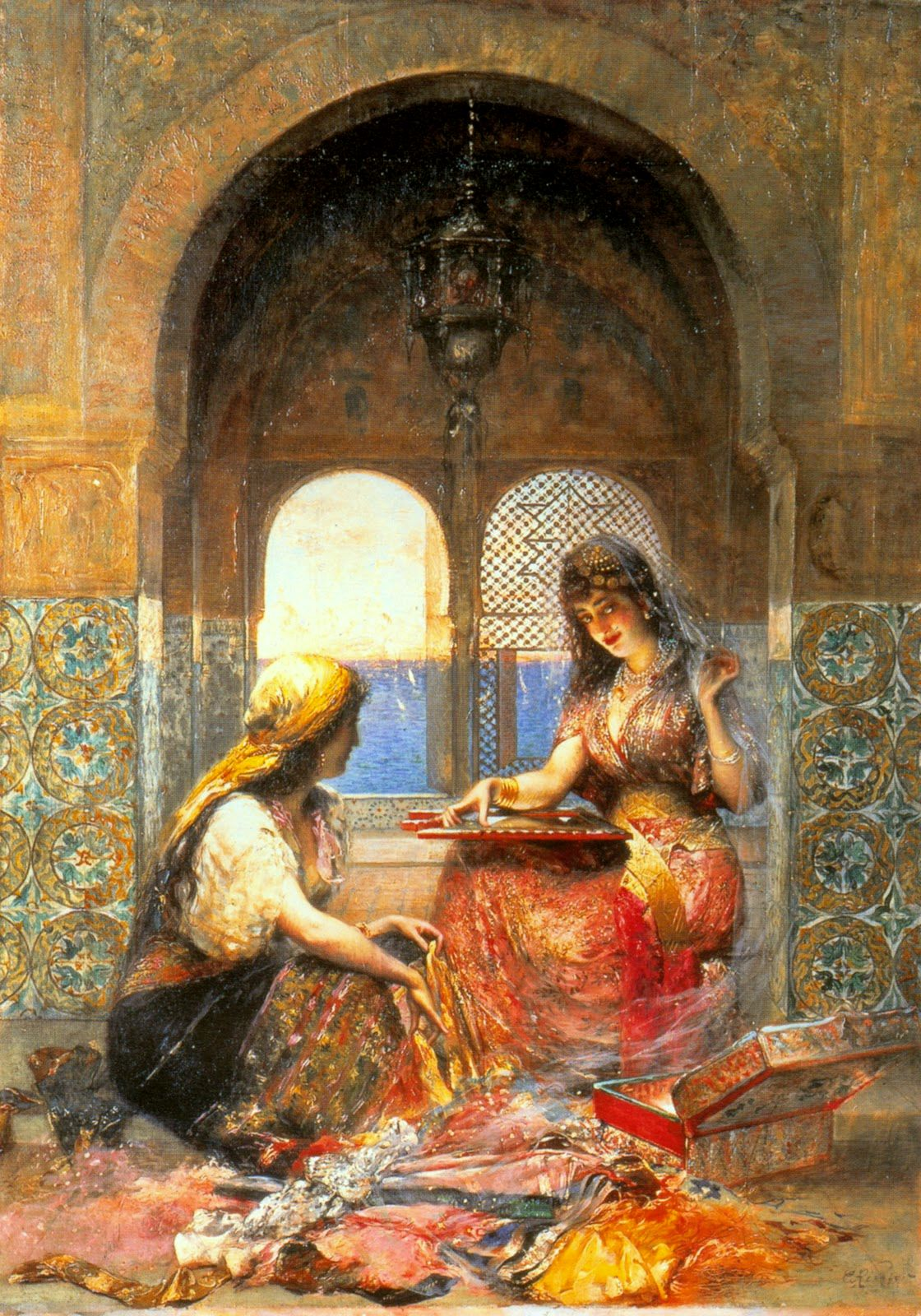
The final decision, before 1913

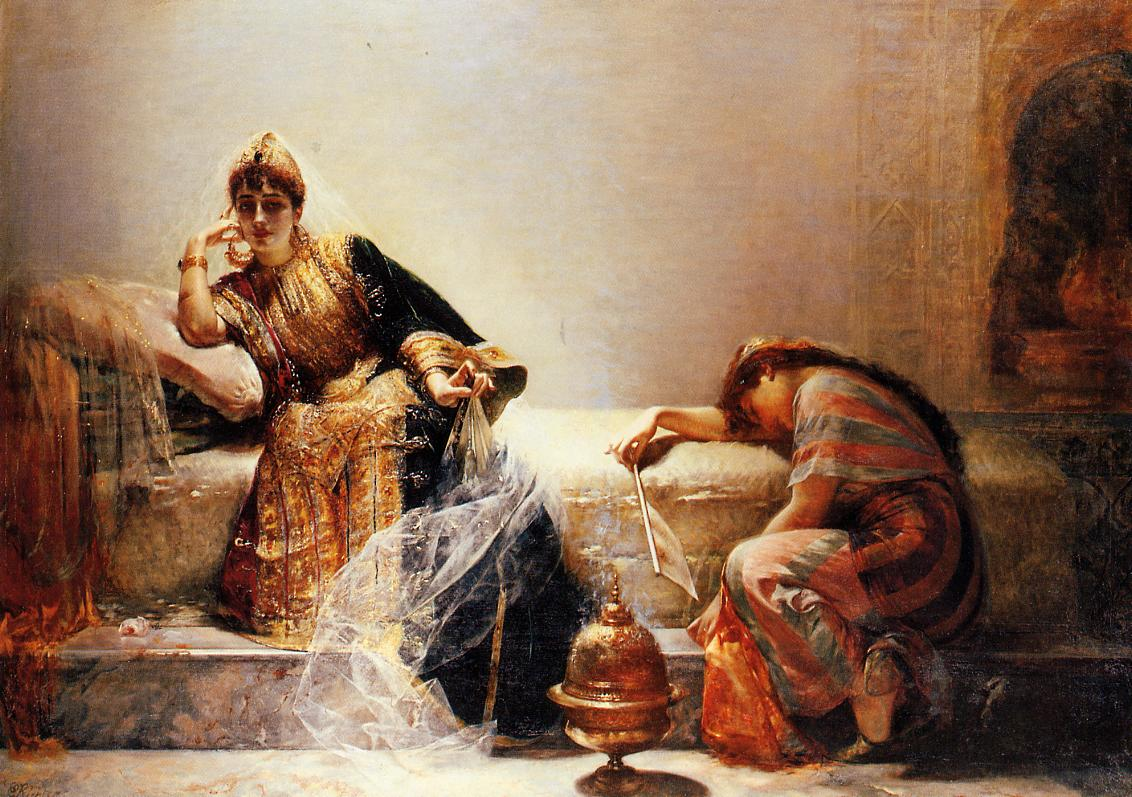
Scheherazade, 1913

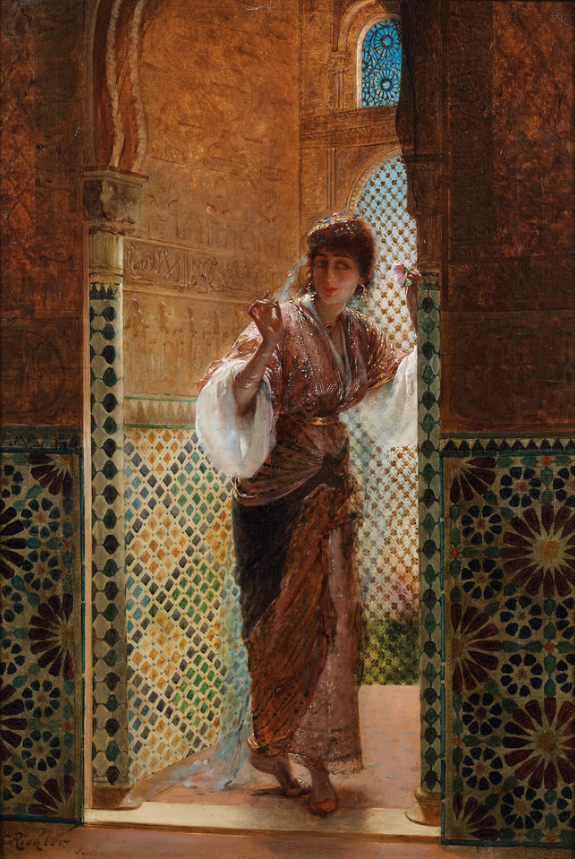
Oriental beauty by a window, 1913

== Sources ==
- La Chronique des arts et de la curiosité, Bureaux de la Gazette des beaux-arts, 1913.
