= Matthew Richter =

American writer

Matthew Richter (born 1968 in New York City) is an American author, producer, performer, and arts entrepreneur living in Seattle, Washington. He is the Interim Executive Director of the Cultural Space Agency, having most recently served for 9 years as the Cultural Space Liaison for the City of Seattle. He is also well known as the founder of Consolidated Works, a contemporary arts center in Seattle.

Richter has been producing alternative contemporary art, performance, film and music since his graduation from Northwestern University in 1990. In 1992, he formed the seminal Rm 608, a gallery for visual and performing arts, in an abandoned storefront on Seattle's Capitol Hill. The "small but influential" (The Stranger) organization served as the launching point for local talents such as David Schmader, the Trachtenburg Family Slideshow Players, Kia Sian, and Kristen Kosmas, and over the course of its two-year lifespan presented over 200 world-premiere works of theater and performance art, several of which received continued runs off-Broadway in New York City. On its closing in 1994 (the organization's lifespan was built into its structure, and the closing was anticipated) Richter was quoted in The Seattle Weekly as saying, "Organizations should end, in the same way that performances end, so that the audience can clap, go home, and think about what it meant."

In 1994, he was hired as the Theater Editor of The Stranger, the alternative newsweekly in Seattle. While there, he expanded his interest in writing and published investigative journalism (according to the paper's website, one undercover report earned him personal bodyguard protection following death threats made by the group investigated) and feature-length articles that were reprinted in alternative newsweeklies around the country. He was also published in an American Heritage college geography textbook. He left the newspaper in 1997 but continues to publish sporadically, most recently writing on the issue of nonprofit reform in America.

In 1998, he formed Consolidated Works, a contemporary arts center in Seattle, housed in a renovated 32,000-square-foot (3,000 m^{2}) warehouse in Seattle's South Lake Union neighborhood. Art in America called ConWorks (as it was known for short) "the most dazzling" alternative arts space in the Northwest. Over the course of seven years as its executive director, he grew the organization into one of the region's most prestigious arts presenters, working with teams of curators and producers to fill the facility's theater, cinema, visual art gallery, music hall, lecture stage, and bar. The center flourished, reportedly thanks to Richter's "legendary fundraising skills" and "internationally renowned programming" (Seattle Post-Intelligencer).

In 2002 he was one of twelve individuals invited under the auspices of the Rockefeller Foundation to contribute as founding members of the National Arts and Technology Network. In 2003 he received the Seattle Mayor's Arts Award on behalf of ConWorks, and also in 2003 was one of 12 recipients nationally of the Safeco Insurance Rudy Award for leadership in the nonprofit sector. A profile of the Seattle arts scene in Art in America referred to Richter as "an arts visionary." A profile in The Stranger referred to him as "freakishly ambitious."
