= Johann Gottfried Ohnefalsch Richter =

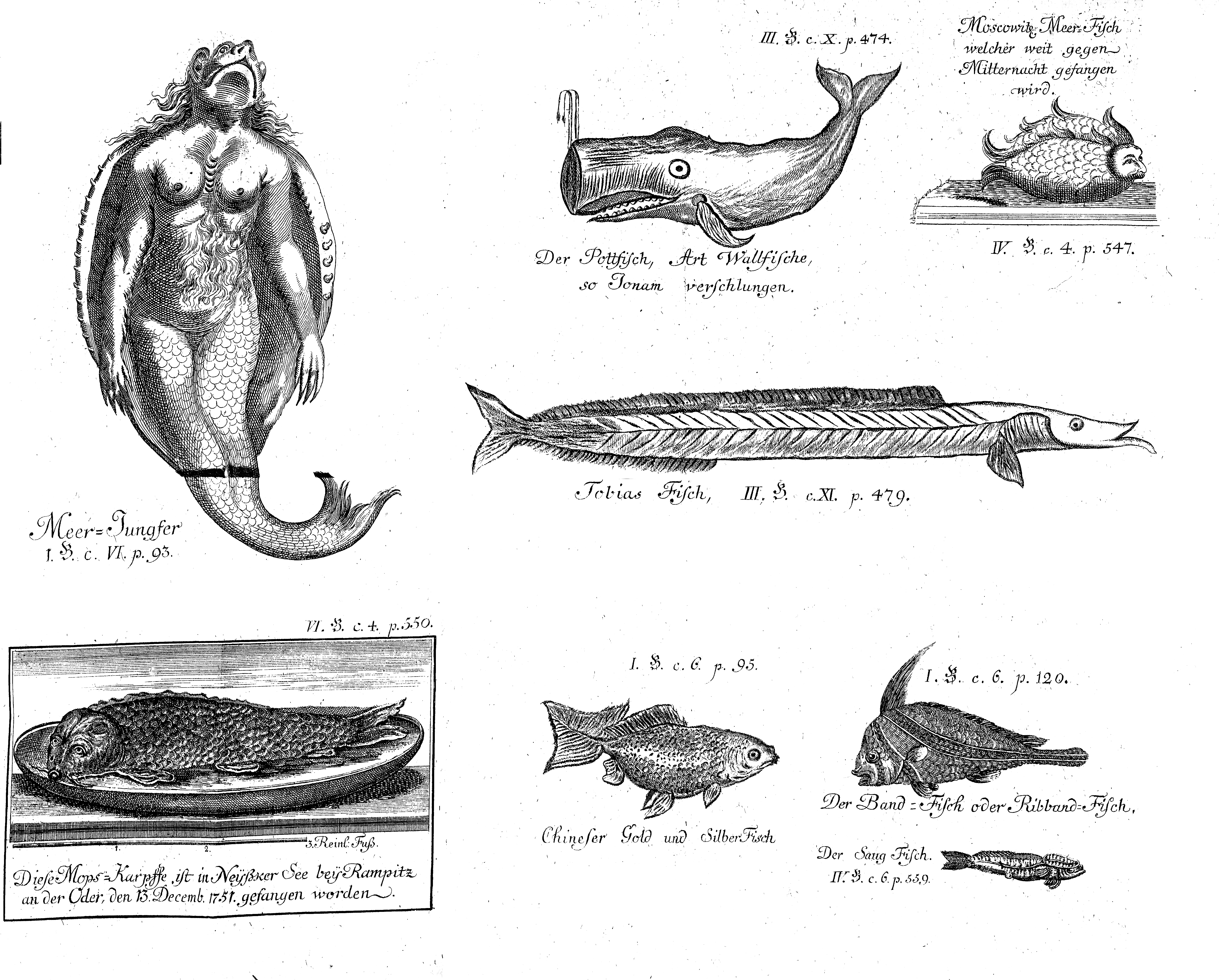
Plate from Ichthyotheologie (1754)

Johann Gottfried Ohnefalsch Richter or Jan Boguměr Rychtar in the Lower Sorbian form (11 March 1703 – 8 January 1765) was a Sorbian-German Protestant pastor, folklorist, and writer. He wrote a history of the city of Cottbus and a book on natural theology titled Ichthyotheologie (1754), intended to inspire admiration for God through the study of fishes.

== Biography ==
Richter was born in Cottbus to shoemaker Martin and Anna Dorothea, daughter of pastor Martin Fabricius. At the age of six, he lost his father, and a few years later in 1711, his mother also died. He was then raised by his maternal grandfather pastor Martin Fabricius and family in Groß Schacksdorf near Forst. His grandparents taught him Sorbian. After Gymnasium at Bautzen/Budissin he studied theology at Halle (1724) and became a vicar in Jänschwalde two years later. He began to collate information on the city of Cottbus and other Lower Lusatian towns from 1730. He became a pastor at Rampitz in 1734 and stayed there until his death. In 1754 he wrote Ichtyotheologie, an approach to admire the Creator through a contemplation of the fishes. Many of his manuscripts were destroyed in the fire of Rampitz in 1772.

Richter's Ichthyotheologie drew from several other works in natural theology. He noted Johann Christian Benemann (1683-1744) and his Blumengedanken oder Blumentheologie (flower thoughts or flower theology) as well as Johann Heinrich Zorn's Petinotheologie as books that he had examined. The book had four parts dealing with physico-theological structure. The first dealt with the origin, nature, and types of fish. The second on the uses. The third deals with divine intentions and thoughts in the Bible on fish. The fourth dealt with fantastic fish and how the duties of humans as decided by God can be deduced. He also included some natural history observations such as the fish compositions of various German rivers and the idea that pike eggs could be transported by ducks. He noted a mass death of fish caused by sulfur fumes entering the water following an earthquake.

Richter married Friederike Theodora Böttner and they had four sons. It has been claimed that Richter died in Frankfurt, beaten up by students, but there is no evidence that he ever worked there.
