= Robert Richter =

Robert Richter may refer to:

- Robert Richter (German film producer) (1899–1972), German filmmaker
- Robert Richter (American film producer) (1929–2025), American documentary filmmaker
- Robert Richter (lawyer) (born 1946), Australian barrister
