= Lawrence Pech =

Lawrence Pech (born 1959) is an American dancer, composer, choreographer and teacher. He lives and works in the San Francisco Bay Area.

== Early life and education ==
Pech was born in 1959 in Denver, Colorado. He received his early classical music training in piano and voice. His first choreographic effort was in the fourth grade, to the Beatles’ "Something..." Pech began studying ballet at the age of 14 with the Colorado Concert Ballet. At 16, he won First Prize in the Colorado Council on the Arts Choreography Competition with a piece set to Pink Floyd's "Have a Cigar". The following year (1977), he received full scholarships to the Joffrey Ballet and American Ballet Theatre schools, the School of American Ballet (New York City Ballet), and Mudra (Maurice Béjart's Ballet of the 20th century in Brussels).

== Career ==
Pech accepted a contract from ABT in 1980 directly from the artistic director, Mikhail Baryshnikov. For the next seven years, he worked with and was choreographed upon by such masters as George Balanchine, Martha Graham, Antony Tudor, Agnes de Mille, Jerome Robbins (touring with him to the Spoleto Festival in 1982), Twyla Tharp, Paul Taylor, Jiri Kylian, Karole Armitage, David Gordon, Eric Bruhn, Natalia Makarova, Mark Morris, and others. He danced opposite such greats as Mr. Baryshnikov, Ms. Makarova, Ivan Nagy, Cynthia Gregory, Fernando Bujones, Gelsey Kirkland, Cynthia Harvey, Martine van Hamel, Kevin McKenzie, and others. He appeared in numerous Live from Lincoln Center telecasts, and figured prominently with Baryshnikov in the movie Dancer and the Dance (BBC).

In 1986, Helgi Tomasson invited Pech to join the San Francisco Ballet, and he was promoted to Principal dancer in 1990. There, he was choreographed by James Kudelka, David Bintley, Val Caniparoli, Mr. Tomasson, and Lisa deRibere, as well performing principal roles in ballets by Balanchine and others. In 1991, Pech was the subject of a KQED-TV special entitled "Blue Lair", a ballet about his victory over cancer. It was awarded a 1991 Emmy Award for Best Choreography. In 1993, he became co-founder and Artistic Director of the Diablo Ballet, but resigned in 1995.

== Other associations ==
Pech produced, directed, and performed in three separate programs of original creations for The Florence Gould Theater at the California Palace of the Legion of Honor's Summer Arts Series, The Neptune Society at the Columbarium of San Francisco, and the California Institute of the Arts Summer Program (Valencia). He earned a Bachelor of Music degree in Composition from the San Francisco Conservatory of Music. He has written seven musical scores, including a three-movement piano suite, a song cycle for 16 a capella voices, and various chamber works. Pech choreographed as well as performed in numerous musicals around the San Francisco Bay Area (such as Mountain Play's Oklahoma!, which garnered him the Bay Area Theater Critics' Circle Awards for Best Supporting Actor in a Musical as Will Parker and Best Choreography, 1992). He continues to choreograph for the Belasco Children's Theater, and teaches ongoing master classes for Pacific Ballet Academy, the San Francisco Dance Center, and other companies throughout the U.S.

Lawrence Pech has been Ballet Master for the San Francisco Opera for the past several years. He continues to choreograph and compose. He completed his masters degree in composition at the San Francisco Conservatory of Music, under the tuleage of David Conte, chair of the department in 2025.
