= Christophe Richer =

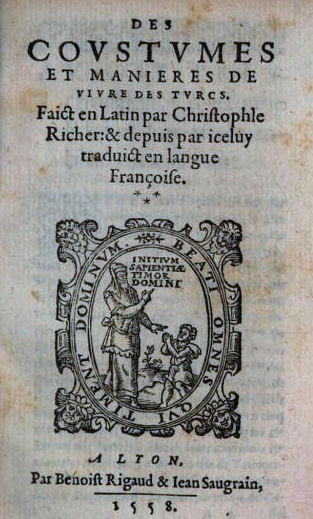
Des Coustumes et manieres de vivre des Turcs by Christophe Richer.

Christophe Richer de Thorigny (Italian: Christoforo Riccherio) (1514?–1552/53) was valet de chambre to Francis I, a secretary to Cardinal Antoine Duprat, and a French ambassador of the 16th century. He was born in Thorigny-sur-Oreuse (to day, Yonne departement) Thorigny. His father, and his brother Nicolas was notary. His oldest brother, Jean Richer (+1569), was president of the presidial of Sens (Yonne), friend of Joachim Du Bellay, and Andre, another brother, monk of the Vauluisant abbey, was bishop of Chalcedonia (+1555). He was ambassador to Scandinavia and Germany.

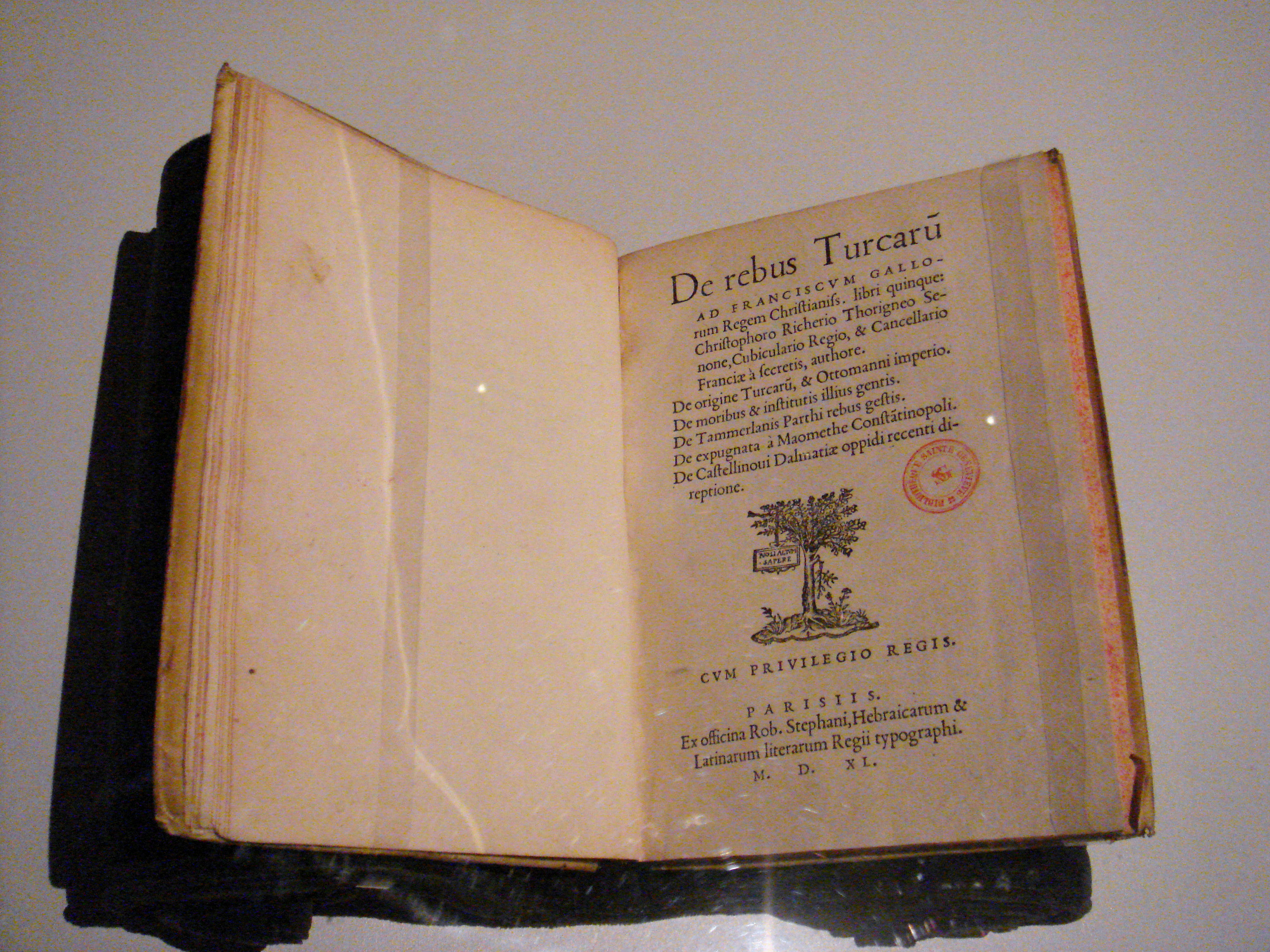
De rebus Turcarum by Christophe Richer, 1540.

In the 1530s, Christophe Richer was sent by Francis I to Constantinople. In 1540 he published a study of the Ottoman civilization, De rebus Turcarum, also published in French that same year under the title Des Coustumes et manières de vivre des Turcs.

In 1541, Francis I sent Christophe Richer to Denmark and Sweden, the first official French embassy to a Protestant state. Richer was French ambassador to Denmark in 1547.

== Works ==
- De rebus Turcarum ad Franciscum Gallorum regem Christianiss by Christophe Richer
- Des Coustumes et manières de vivre des Turcs by Christophe Richer

Some authors had been considered his work about the Fall of Constantinople as an account of an eyewitness (certain unknown Riccherio), but it was later discovered that it was actually Christophe Richer who composed his testimony of this event based on the work of several historians, such as Egnatius Cipelli, Flavio Biondo, Bartolomeo Platina, Michele Ricci, Robert Gaugin, Paolo Giovio and Andrea Cambini.

== See also ==
- Franco-Ottoman alliance
