= Josef Karl Richter =

Czech composer

Josef Karl Richter (16 March 1880 in Podersam – 22 September 1933 in Vienna) was a Bohemian composer and military bandmaster.

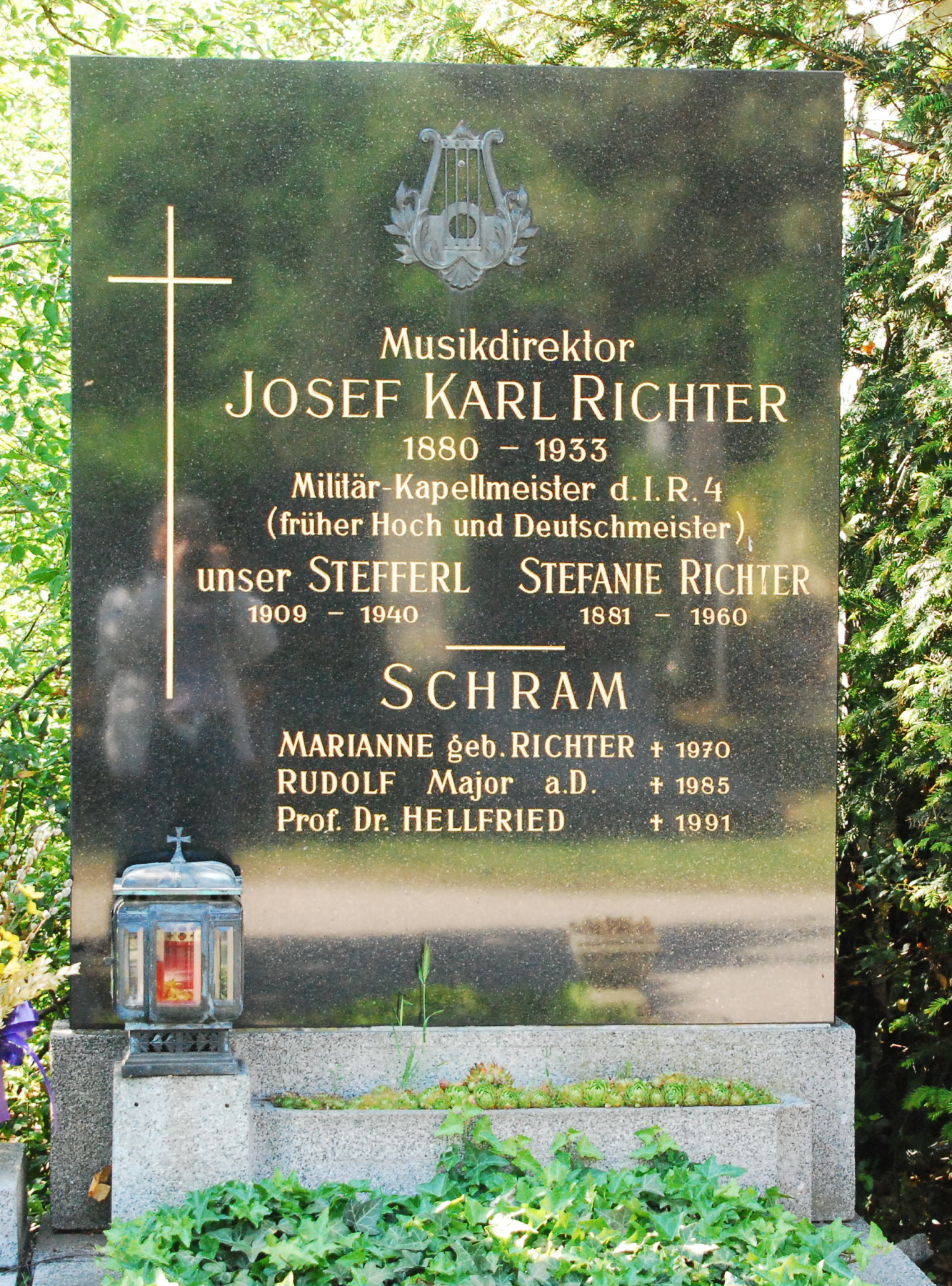
Josef Karl Richter's grave in Zentralfriedhof Vienna, Austria

Richter was the son of a court official. He studied music and graduated in 1898. In the same year he joined the military band of the Infantry Regiment No. 74 and stayed there until 1901. During World War I he served as a medical orderly in the Austro-Hungarian Army and was promoted to sergeant major in 1916. From 1918 to 1920 he was conductor of the "Volkswehr battalion no. 6" in Vienna. From 1920 to 1924 he was conductor of the "Brigade-Musik" in Vienna. In 1924 was appointed bandmaster of the Infantry Regiment No. 4. He remained in this position until 1932. He was a close friend of Franz Lehár and adapted many of his works for concert band.

== Works ==
Richter composed mostly marches, dance and light music for concert band.

- Heimkehr, march
- Heldentotenlied, in five movements for baritone and concert band
- Jung Deutschmeister, march
- Requiem, for male choir and concert band
- Romanze nr. 2, for concert band
- Romanze nr. 3, for concert band
- Sangesbrüder, march
- Semendria, march
- Treue Kameraden, march
- Zum Ausmarsch bereit, march
