= Christoph Richter (mayor) =

Politician (1596 – 1669)

Mayor of Szczecin
- In office 1659 – 24 February 1669 Serving with Heinrich Braunschweig, Peter Gericke (until 1664), and Caspar Meyer (1666–1668)
- Preceded by: Johann Pasenow
- Succeeded by: Ulrich Clemens Michaelis

Personal details
- Born: 1596 Szczecin, Duchy of Pomerania-Stettin, Holy Roman Empire (now part of Poland)
- Died: 24 February 1669 (aged 72–73) Szczecin, Swedish Pomerania (now part of Poland)
- Education: University of Greifswald
- Occupation: Lawyer, statesperson

Christoph Richter (German: [ˈkrɪstɔf ˈʁɪçtɐ]; also Latinised as Richterus, German: [ˈʁɪçtəʁʊs]; 1596 – 24 February 1669) was a lawyer and a statesperson from the city of Szczecin, located in the Duchy of Pomerania-Stettin and later in Swedish Pomerania. He served as the mayor of Szczecin, now located in West Pomeranian Voivodeship, Poland, from 1659 to 1669. He held a title of a knight, granted in 1660.

== History ==
Christoph Richter was born in 1596 in the city of Szczecin in the Duchy of Pomerania-Stettin, a part of the Holy Roman Empire. He studied philosophy at the University of Greifswald. Richter was a lawyer and a district administrator. In 1659, he became the mayor of Szczecin, then part of Swedish Pomerania, a dominion of the Swedish Empire. Currently, it is located in West Pomeranian Voivodeship, Poland. During his term he shared his office with Heinrich Braunschweig, Peter Gericke (until 1664), and Caspar Meyer (1666–1668).

The same year he was appointed, the city came under the siege during the Second Northern War. It successfully resisted the attack of the Habsburgian and Brandenburgian forces. As a token of the appreciation of their efforts during the siege, Richter and the two other mayors, Heinrich Braunschweig and Peter Gerike, were granted knighthoods in 1660. Later that year, Richter was one of the three representatives of Szczecin sent to a meeting between the cities of Swedish Pomeranian, held in Greifswald in connection with the succession of Charles XI as the king of Sweden. Together with councillor Heinrich Starke, he then traveled to Stockholm for meetings with the regency council rulling in the name of the underaged king. The latter meeting resulted in regained access to the city's arsenal, and the promise of a review of the city's staple right.

Richter died on 24 Februar 1669 in Szczecin, at the age of either 72 or 73, and was buried on 15 March 1669. He died while in office.
