= Roy Robert Richter =

Australian oil industry executive

Roy Robert Richter, O.B.E. (8 July 1915 – 14 December 2007) was a pioneer in the Australian oil industry and former World War II RAF Bomber Command pilot with No. 189 Squadron RAF based at RAF Fulbeck in Lincolnshire.

Roy Richter, or "Triple R", as he became known by colleagues and friends, was awarded the OBE (Officer of the Most Excellent Order of the British Empire) in 1972 for his "pioneering and dynamic contribution to the development of the Australian oil-drilling industry".

== Early life ==
After primary years at the nearby local Waterford State School, Roy Richter was offered a scholarship to attend Brisbane State High School in Brisbane city. He attended high school for two years, however, during the Great Depression, he left formal schooling to help his struggling family. He worked firstly for one of his sisters, Lillian (Lil), and her husband, Edward (Ted) Wendt, on their farm at nearby Buccan, and again at Murgon when they moved to a much larger farm. As a teenager, the farm work proved lonely and he returned home and, before its closure in 1934, worked as an apprentice in the blacksmith's shop at the nearby Kingston Gold Mine.

In 1940, on one of his leaves to mainland Australia, he met and married a nurse, Marie Dempster Lascelles Jardine, descendant of the pioneering Jardine family which settled the Cape York area. The marriage lasted only briefly.

== Oil industry ==
Over the years, the Richter name became well known in the oil industry, starting out in the 1940-50s with Australian Petroleum Company in Papua New Guinea; from 1954 with Australian Associated Oil Fields firstly in Roma in outback Queensland, then later in the remote Kimberley (Western Australia).

With the boom of oil exploration in Australia in the early 1960s, following amendments to the Petroleum Search Subsidy Act 1959,

Richter-Bawden drilled the Moonie and Roma oil and gas fields and the company is credited with building the first gas pipeline in Australia, allowing local gas to be used to generate electricity in the town of Roma. Today, Roy Richter's voice can be heard through one of the several audio panels within the Oil Patch interactive walkthrough display on the history of the local oil and gas industry, which forms part of Roma's The Big Rig and its Oil and Gas Museum tourist attraction.

In 1968, the company, against fierce international competition, also won the contract for the first offshore drilling platform in Australia. When the country's first offshore blow-out occurred later that year on one of its Bass Strait rigs, the Marlin platform, assistance from internationally renowned Red Adair – the American oil well firefighter – won Roy Richter membership of the "Royal Order of Fire Eaters".

By the late 1970s, Richter Drilling was Australia's leading oil drilling contractor with almost 500 employees working across 10 rigs in Australia and the South East Asian region.

From its inception in 1959, Roy Richter was an active member of QUPEX – The Queensland Petroleum Exploration Association – serving time as chairman and vice-chairman in 1964 and 1963, respectively, and served as the Chairman of QUPEX Golf for 12 years. He was also a foundation member of the Oilwell Drilling Contractors Association of Australia and former president.
