= Praetorius =

Praetorius, Prätorius, Prætorius was the name of several musicians and scholars in Germany.

In 16th and 17th century Germany it became a fashion for educated people named "Schulze," "Schultheiß," or "Richter" (which means "judge"), to Latinise their names as "Praetorius," referring to a former official position called "Praetor urbanus."

- Anton Praetorius (1560–1613), pastor and fighter against the persecution of witches and against torture
- Bartholomaeus Praetorius (c.1590–1623), composer and cornettist
- Christoph Praetorius (died 1609), composer; uncle of Michael
- Franz Praetorius (1847–1927), semitist and Hebraist
- Jacob Praetorius the Elder (c.1520–1586), composer and organist; father of Hieronymus the Elder
  - Hieronymus Praetorius the Elder (1560–1629), composer and organist; son of Jacob the Elder, father of Jacob, Hieronymus, and Johann
    - Jacob Praetorius the Younger (1586–1651), composer, organist, and teacher; son of Hieronymus the Elder, brother of Johann and Hieronymus
    - Hieronymus Praetorius the Younger (1595–1651), clergyman, theologian, physicist, and university professor; son of Hieronymus the Elder, brother of Jacob and Johann
    - Johann Praetorius (1595–1660), organist and composer; son of Hieronymus the Elder, brother of Jacob and Hieronymus
- Ida Praetorius (born 1993), Danish ballerina
- Johann Praetorius (musician) (1634–1705), educator, astronomer, and musician
- Johannes Praetorius (mathematician) or Johann Richter (1537–1616), mathematician and astronomer
- Johannes Praetorius (historian) (1630–1680), writer and polymath, real name Hans Schultze
- Matthäus Prätorius (1635–1704), pastor, priest, historian, and ethnographer
- Michael Praetorius (c.1571–1621), composer, music theorist, and organist
- Stephan Praetorius (1536–1603), theologian
- Zacharias Praetorius (1535–1575), pen name of German Protestant theologian Zacharias Breiter

== Other uses ==
- "Praetorius (Courante)", a song by Blackmore’s Night from their 2001 album Fires at Midnight
- Cary Grant plays Dr. Noah Praetorius in the film People Will Talk (1951), directed by Joseph Mankiewicz).
- Praetorius (1965), West German film directed by Kurt Hoffmann

== See also ==
- Pretorius
- Scultetus
