= Johannes Praetorius =

Johannes or Johann Praetorius may refer to:

- Johannes Praetorius (mathematician) (1537–1616), German mathematician and astronomer
- Johannes Praetorius (historian) (1630–1680), German writer and historian
- Johann Praetorius (musician) (1634–1705), German educator, astronomer and musician
- Johann Praetorius (composer) (1595–1660), German Baroque composer and organist
