= Jeffery T. Kite-Powell =

American musicologist (born 1941)

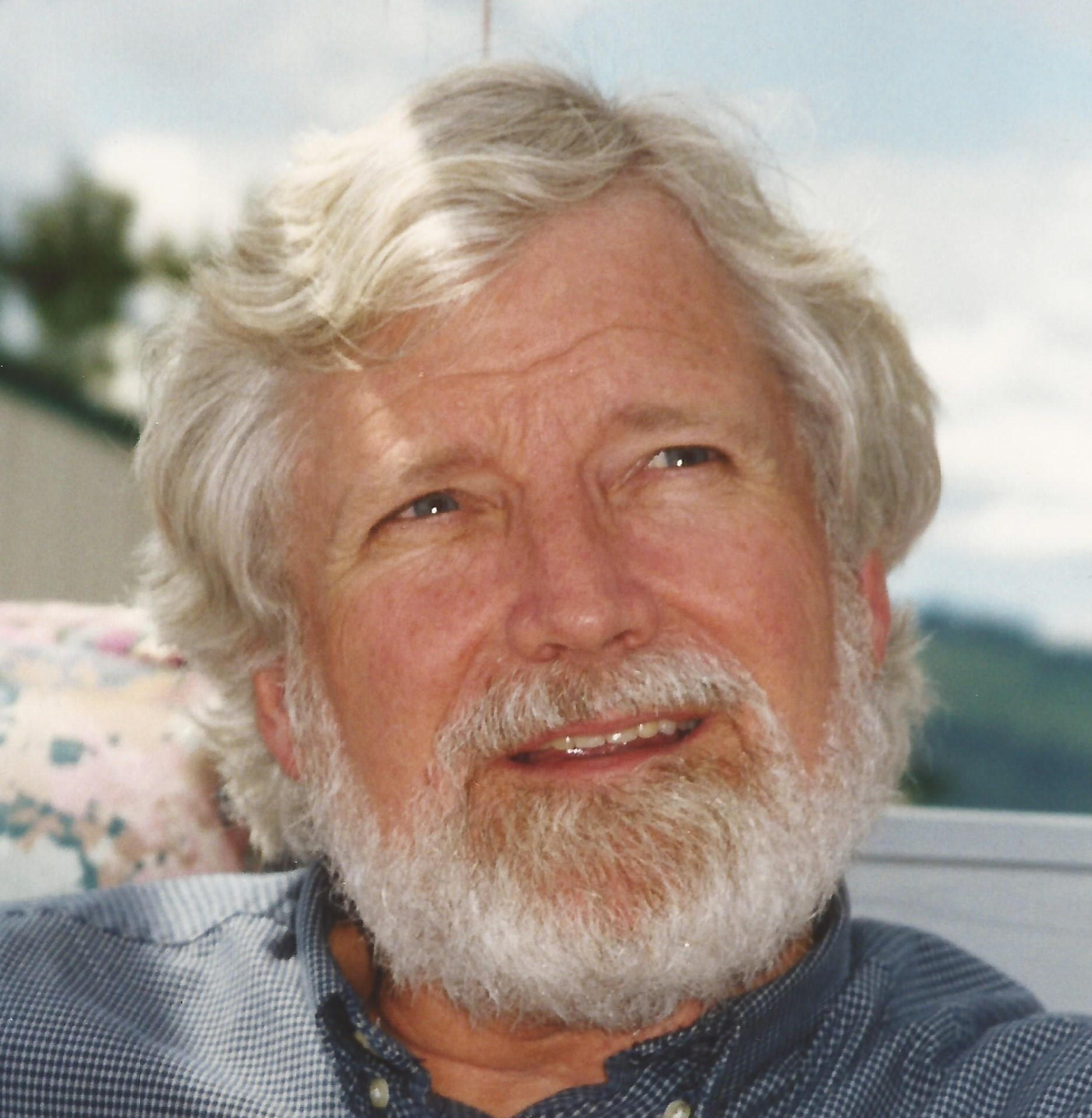
- Born: June 24, 1941 (age 85); Miami, Florida, US
- Education: University of Cincinnati; University of New Mexico; University of Hamburg
- Occupation: Musicologist

Jeffery T. Kite-Powell (born June 24, 1941) is an American musicologist and professor emeritus at the Florida State University College of Music where he was active from 1984 to 2013. During his tenure at FSU, he was coordinator of the Music History and Musicology Division from 1996 to 2008. (Note: Jeffery T. Kite-Powell was professor and chair of the Music History and Musicology Department at Florida State University and director of the FSU Early Music Program. The titles have evolved over time.) He also directed the Florida State University early music ensembles and in 1989 he founded the vocal group Cantores Musicæ Antiquæ. Kite-Powell's primary focuses are the music of the Renaissance and early Baroque periods, organ tablature, historical performance practice, and Michael Praetorius.

== Education ==
Kite-Powell received the Bachelor of Music degree in clarinet performance in 1963 from the College-Conservatory of Music in Cincinnati (Note: Now known as the University of Cincinnati – College-Conservatory of Music. Again, naming conventions change over time.) and the Bachelor of Science in Music Education in 1964 from the University of Cincinnati. He earned the Master of Arts degree in musicology from the University of New Mexico while serving in the U.S. Army at Sandia Base (1965–1968) and the Ph.D. in musicology from the University of Hamburg, in Hamburg, Germany in 1976.

== On Michael Praetorius ==
Kite-Powell has written multiple articles based on his research of Michael Praetorius and published a translation of the 1619 treatise Syntagma Musicum III.

Michael Praetorius's Syntagma Musicum III, which focuses, in part, on performance practice of the period, is the third volume of his treatise Syntagma Musicum. This work provides insight into how music of this period was actually performed and is foundational to modern, historically informed performance. Kite-Powell's early music ensembles have performed multiple works by this composer, in a historically informed manner. (Note: Works by Michael Praetorius playlist on YouTube)

In his article "Michael Praetorius: In His Own Words", Kite-Powell holds a hypothetical interview with Michael Praetorius. In this "interview", Kite-Powell outlines Praetorius's education, career, and contributions to musical theory and performance in an approachable, question and answer format.

Kite-Powell's article "Performance Forces and Italian Influence in Michael Praetorius's Syntagma Musicum III" (Note: Kite-Powell's paper "Performance Forces and Italian Influence in Michael Praetorius's Syntagma Musicum III" was presented at the conference in Wolfenbüttel in 2008. The article published in the proceedings is a shortened version. "Performance Forces and Italian Influence in Michael Praetorius's Syntagmamusicum III", in Michael Praetorius: Vermittler europäischer Musiktraditionen um 1600, eds. Susanne Rode-Breymann and Arne Spohr. Hildesheim: Georg Olms Verlag, 2011, pp. 115–132.) provides statistical information regarding Syntagma Musicum III. Kite-Powell uses this statistical information to illustrate Michael Praetorius's thinking process and the elements that influenced it.

== On Hieronymus Praetorius ==
In 1980, Kite-Powell published his two-volume book, The Visby (Petri) organ tablature: investigation and critical edition documenting his research of the tablature. Since the Visby (Petri) tablature, which was written circa 1600, is the earliest surviving tablature of Hamburg origin, it is critically important to the investigation of organ music from Hamburg and Northern Germany during that era. According to Kite-Powell's book, Hieronymus Praetorius was the "most prolific and influential composer in North Germany" during this period. Among his many other contributions to organ music, Hieronymus Praetorius is credited with the founding of the organ tradition known as the "Hamburg School". Kite-Powell's book also covers the compositions of Jacob Praetorius contained within the tablature, which he notes are "of great significance" as well as the contributions of Johann Bahr. (Note: Jeffery T. Kite-Powell (2001). "Bahr [Bähr], Johann". Grove Music Online (8th ed.). Oxford University Press. doi:10.1093/gmo/9781561592630.article.01780. ISBN 978-1-56159-263-0. (subscription, Wikilibrary access, or UK public library membership required)) Levavi oculos meos à 10 by Hieronymus Praetorius as performed by the Florida State University Early Music Ensembles, performed on period instruments, and conducted by Kite-Powell on April 21, 2013, at St. John's Episcopal church, Tallahassee, is an example of how Hieronymus Praetorius's work would have been performed in this period. (Note: Levavi ocolus meos à 10 by Hieronymus Praetorius on YouTube)

In July 1995, Kite-Powell presented his paper entitled "The Hieronymus/Anonymous Question in the Visby (Petri) Tablature" at the Hamburg-Scandinavian Organ Festival in Hamburg, Germany. The Visby (Petri) tablature itself documents three known contributors, Hieronymus Praetorius, his son Jacob Praetorius, and Johann Bahr as well as one anonymous composer. The "question" this paper addresses is that of the identity of the anonymous composer. There are "41 anonymous works—hymns, Kyries, Agnus Deis, and Sequences" contained within the tablature. Kite-Powell's research presented in his paper is aimed at unraveling this mystery.

== Cantores Musicæ Antiquæ ==
In 1989, Kite-Powell founded the vocal group Cantores Musicæ Antiquæ [Singers of Early Music] with the "goal of performing music from 1200 to 1650 in a historically informed manner". The group is generally made up of between eight and twelve singers. These singers are undergraduates, masters, and doctoral students with majors ranging from voice to musicology. The group has performed at regional and national conventions throughout the southeastern United States and has been broadcast on National Public Radio's Millennium of Music. Several of the works performed by these groups were performed for the first time since their seventeenth century premieres. Tomás Luis de Victoria's Officium Defunctorum (Requiem Mass à 6) is the most listened to performance and has garnered numerous reviews.

== Conference presentations ==
Kite-Powell was an invited lecturer at the Götebord International Organ Academy conference in Göteborg, Sweden, 1994, the Hamburg-Scandinavian Organ Festival conference in Hamburg, Germany, 1995, the Instrumentälischer Bettlermantl Conference at the University of Edinburgh in Edinburgh, Scotland, 1997, where he was the keynote speaker, the conference Michael Praetorius: Vermittler europäischer Musiktraditionen um 1600 in Wolfenbüttel, Germany, 2008, and the International Musicological Conference entitled Syntagma Musicum 1619–2019 held in Ljubljana, Slovenia, 2019.

== Principal publications ==
=== Books ===
- The Visby (Petri) organ tablature: investigation and critical edition
- The reconstruction of Hugo Leichsenring's dissertation Hamburgische Kirchenmusik im Reformationsaltar
- Syntagma Musicum III
- A Performer's Guide to Renaissance Music
- A Performer's Guide to Seventeenth-Century Music, 2nd edition

=== Articles ===
- "The Hieronymus/Anonymous Question in the Visby (Petri) Tablature"
- "Michael Praetorius: In His Own Words"
- "Performance Forces and Italian Influence in Michael Praetorius's Syntagma Musicum III"
- "Michael Praetorius's Variable Opinions on Performance"
- "Notating—Accompanying—Conducting: Intabulation Usage in the Levoča Manuscripts"
- "Michael Praetorius's Organ works: The Notation Conundrum Revisited"
- "German Keyboard Tablature"

== Honors and awards ==
- Early Music America's Thomas Binkley Award for Outstanding Achievement by a Collegium Director (2003)
- Festschrift – "Hands-On" Musicology: Essays in Honor of Jeffery Kite-Powell

== Professional activities ==
- Founding member and President of the Board of Directors of Early Music America (1998–2001)
- Member of the American Musicological Society
- Member of the Society of Seventeenth-Century Music (treasurer, 1997–1999) (Note: www.crookedriverdesign.com, Site Developed by Crooked River Design. "Society for Seventeenth-Century Music". sscm-sscm.org.; "Past Governing Boards | Society for Seventeenth-Century Music". Society for Seventeenth-Century Music.)
- Member of the Southern Chapter of the American Musicological Society (president, 1992–1994)
