= Paul Francke (architect) =

German architect

Paul Francke (c. 1537, Weimar - 10 November 1615, Wolfenbüttel) was a German Renaissance architect, most notable as director of works for the Duchy of Brunswick-Lüneburg from 1564 until his death in 1615. His works include the Juleum Novum in Helmstedt, the Marienkirche in Wolfenbüttel (where he is also buried) and the Burganlage in Erichsburg.

== Life ==
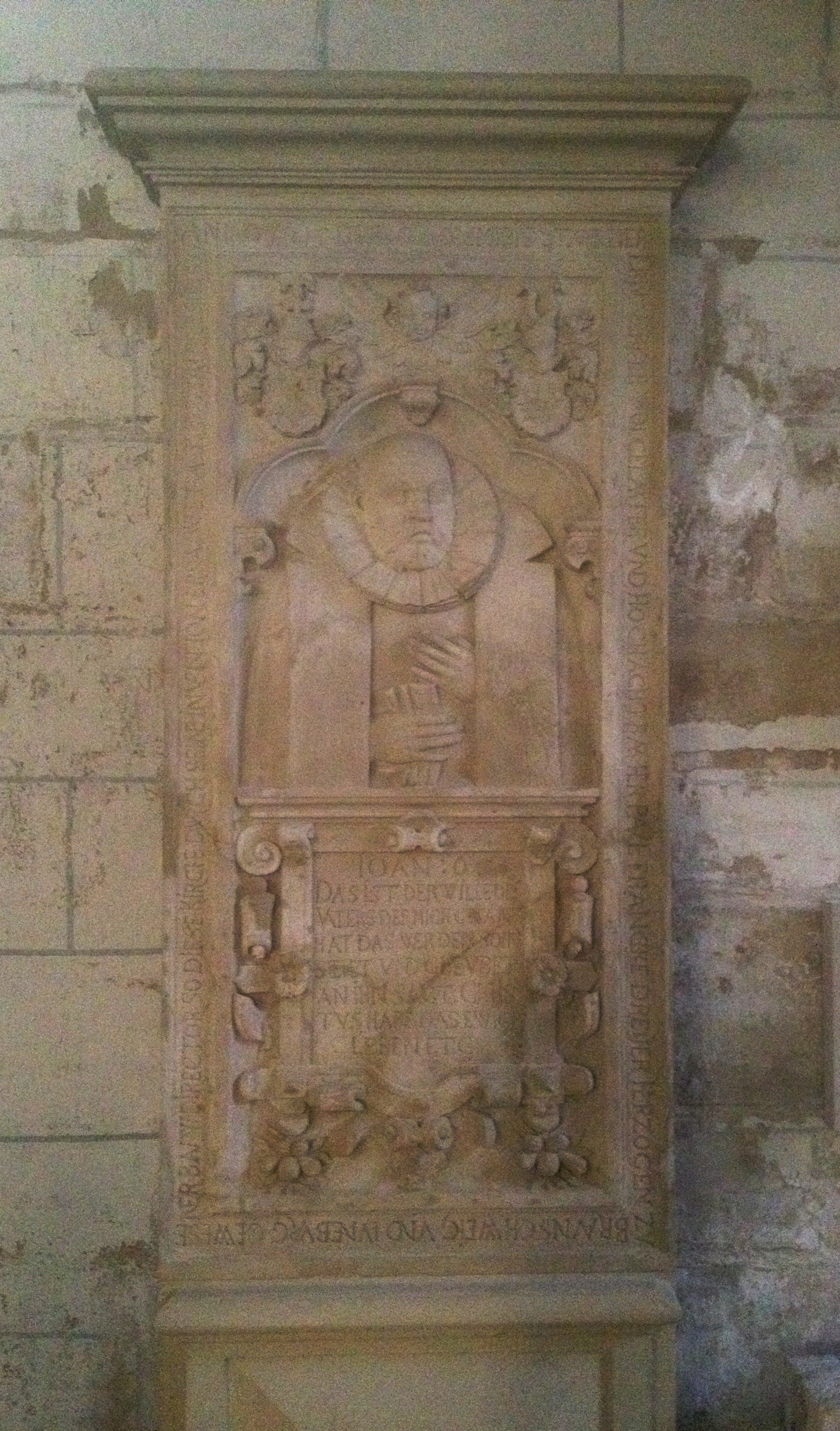
His monument.

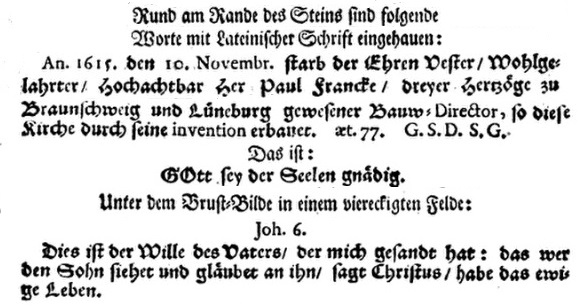
His epitaph

Since he was born in Weimar, he was influenced by 16th-century castles and town halls in Thuringia and Saxony. He is first recorded as director of works in 1564, swearing an oath to Julius, Duke of Brunswick-Lüneburg the following year after working for him on Hesse Castle. He is also recorded in 1573 as a 'Bauverwalter' or 'construction manager'. In 1575 he was put in charge of all the duke's building projects, including the fortifications for the new Heinrichstadt and Wolfenbüttel Castle, employing the Dutch engineer Wilhelm de Raet. Next he directed the construction of the college buildings (1577–78) and main 'Juleum' building (1593-1597) for the new University of Helmstedt. In 1606 he headed the reconstruction of the former abbey church at Riddagshausen Abbey.

From 1608 he also designed and supervised the construction of the Marienkirche in Wolfenbüttel, commissioned by Henry Julius, Duke of Brunswick-Lüneburg. The architects Christoph Tendler, Johann Bock, Philipp Müller, Hans Vredemann de Vries and the military engineer Rochus de Lynar all also worked under his supervision as director of works.

== Buildings ==
His known works include:

- 1564 and 1594: Schloss Hessen am Fallstein
- 1577–1578: Kollegienflügel of the University of Helmstedt
- 1596: Kommisse in Halberstadt
- 1593–1597: Juleum in Helmstedt
- c. 1600: Stift Gandersheim abbey building
- 1604–1612: The surviving part of Erichsburg
- 1606: Restoration of the partially-destroyed Cistercian monastery of Riddagshausen near Brunswick
- Begun in 1608: Marienkirche in Wolfenbüttel
- Begun in 1609: Schloss Salder in Salzgitter-Salder
- Begun in 1613: Zeughaus und Schlossturm in Wolfenbüttel
- 1613: Design for a new version of the Liebfrauenkirche in Hornburg im Harz.

== Bibliography (in German) ==
- Elmar Arnhold: Francke, Paul. In: Horst-Rüdiger Jarck, Dieter Lent u. a. (ed.): Braunschweigisches Biographisches Lexikon – 8. bis 18. Jahrhundert. Appelhans Verlag, Braunschweig 2006, ISBN 3-937664-46-7, S. 227–228.
- Hans Reuther (1961). "Franke, Paul". Neue Deutsche Biographie (in German). Vol. 5. Berlin: Duncker & Humblot. pp. 347–347. (full text online).
- Kurt Seeleke: Paul Francke, ein fürstlicher Baumeister zu Wolfenbüttel. In: Braunschweigisches Jahrbuch. (= Dissertation 1939) Dritte Folge 1, 1940, OCLC 886521973, S. 29–57.
- Friedrich Thöne: Unter Heinrich Julius (Arbeiten vor 1600, Ausbau 1600–1612, Paul Francke und die Befestigung). In: Wolfenbüttel in der Spätrenaissance. Topographie und Baugeschichte unter den Herzögen Heinrich Julius und Friedrich Ulrich (1589 bis 1634). (= Braunschweigisches Jahrbuch. 35). Waisenhaus-Buchdruckerei, Braunschweig 1954, OCLC 223349745, digisrv-1.biblio.etc.tu-bs.de (PDF, S. 13 ff).
- Harmen Thies: Das Juleum novum – Paul Francke. Festvortrag in der Aula des Juleums, in der Reihe Beiträge zur Geschichte des Landkreises und der ehemaligen Universität Helmstedt. Heft 9, Landkreis Helmstedt, Helmstedt 1997, ISBN 3-937733-08-6.
- Falko Rost: Der Architekt Paul Francke und die Kirche Mariae Beatae Virginis (BMV) in Wolfenbüttel. In: Bernd Feicke, Harzverein für Geschichte und Altertumskunde e.V (Hrsg.): Harz-Zeitschrift 2013, 65. Jahrgang. Lukas Verlag, Berlin/ Wernigerode 2013, ISBN 978-3-86732-154-9, S. 63 ff, (books.google.com).
