= Dominik Gross =

German historian

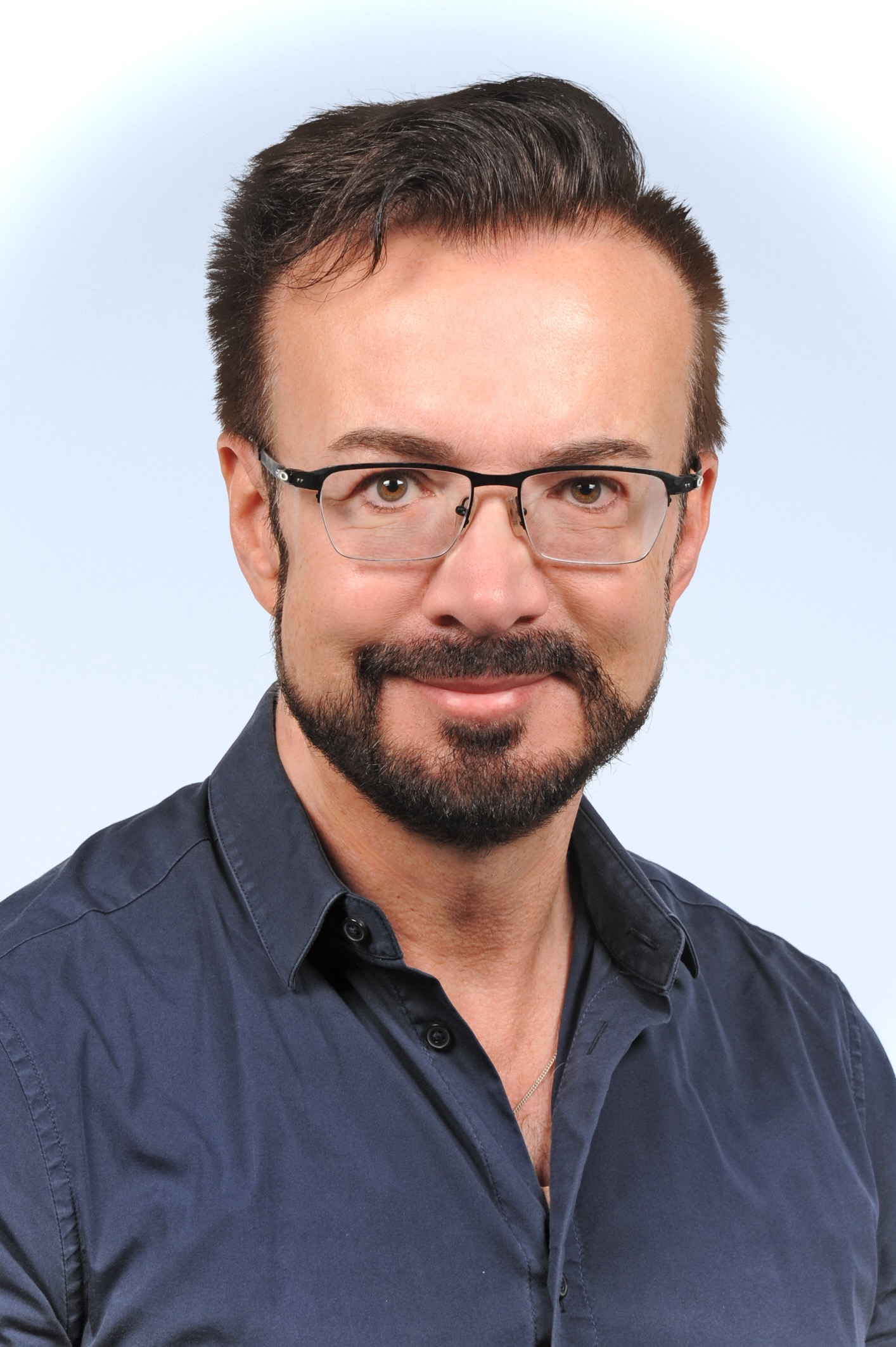
- Dominik Groß (2024)
- Born: 28 September 1964; St. Wendel, Saarland
- Education: Saarland University; University of Ulm
- Known for: Vice-Dean for Studies and Teaching at the Medical Faculty; Rector's Delegate for Antisemitism Prevention; Medicine in the 20th century (with a special focus on the Third Reich); Research on National Socialism and its recent consequences
- Awards: Joseph Schneider Award of the Medical Faculty of the University of Würzburg, Scultetus Award of the Scultetus Society in Ulm (2004) the Dental Ethics Award of the German Society for Oral and Maxillofacial Medicine
- Scientific career
- Fields: Bioethicist, Historian of medicine
- Workplaces: RWTH Aachen
- Website: Prof Gross at RTWH Aachen

Dominik Gross ((German: Groß), born September 28, 1964 in St. Wendel/Saarland, (Germany)) is a German bioethicist and historian of medicine. He is Professor and Director of the Institute of History, Theory and Ethics in Medicine at the RWTH Aachen University, Germany.

== Education ==
Gross studied dentistry and medicine at Saarland University and the University of Ulm as well as history, philosophy and archaeology at Saarland University. He completed each of these courses with a doctorate (1990 Dr. med. dent., 1993 Dr. phil., 2001 Dr. med.). In 1998 he finished his habilitation with the venia legendi for "History, theory and ethics of medicine”. Until 2005, he worked as a private lecturer at the Universities of Würzburg, Ratisbon and Ulm.

== Career ==
In June 2005, Gross was appointed full professor of History, Theory and Ethics in Medicine at the RWTH Aachen. Since October 2005 he has been director of the Institute of History, Theory and Ethics in Medicine of the same university.

Gross’ main fields of research are bioethics as well as medicine in the 20th century (with a special focus on the Third Reich). He has led research projects on the history of dentists and pathologists in the Third Reich and the post-war period and has published numerous international specialist articles, including personal encyclopaedias, memorial books book series and series in specialist journals. Since 2014, he has also been a member of the jury for the ‘Herbert Lewin Prize’, a highly endowed research prize on the role of the medical profession during the Nazi era. Due to his research on National Socialism and its recent consequences, Gross is committed to the protection of Jewish fellow citizens and the promotion of Jewish culture in Germany. In Mai 2024, he was appointed “Rector's Delegate for Antisemitism Prevention” at RWTH Aachen University

Gross' philosophical thesis and his habilitation project were funded by grants from the “German Academic Scholarship Foundation” (Studienstiftung des Deutschen Volkes) and the “German Research Foundation” (Deutsche Forschungsgemeinschaft)” He received several awards (Joseph Schneider Award of the Medical Faculty of the University of Würzburg, Scultetus Award of the Scultetus Society in Ulm (2004) and the Dental Ethics Award of the German Society for Oral and Maxillofacial Medicine (DGZMK).

Since 2007, Gross has been a member of various expert commissions and advisory boards (Grünenthal Foundation for Palliative Medicine, “Zwanzig20” consortium of the Federal Ministry of Education and Research, “European Foundation Aachener Dom”, National AIDS Advisory Council at the Federal Ministry of Health, German Medical Association [Bundesärztekammer], Geman Dental Association [Bundeszahnärztekammer], Institute for Quality and Efficiency in Health Care, etc.). He was a visiting professor at the Charité and at the University of Zurich.

Gross is the initiator and chairman of the Clinical Ethics Committee (KEK) at Aachen University Hospital (founded in 2008), and the founding chairman of the “Ethics Working Group” of the “German Society of Dentistry and Oral Medicine (DGZMK)” (2010). Besides, he is a founding member of the Ethics Group of the IDEA League.

He is an appointed member of the “Acatech – National Academy of Science and Engineering” (since 2021) and of the “European Academy of Sciences and Arts” in Salzburg (Austria) (since 2011).

Since 2021, Gross has been Vice-Dean for Studies and Teaching at the Medical Faculty of RWTH Aachen. In 2024, he was elected to the Board of Trustees of the “German Academic Scholarship Foundation” (Studienstiftung des Deutschen Volkes).

== Bibliography ==
=== Books ===
- Gross, Dominik; Tag, Brigitte; Schweikardt, Christoph (2011). Who wants to live forever?. Frankfurt: Campus. ISBN 978-3-593-39479-4
- Gross, Dominik (2020). 40 Years ITI (1980-2020). A rich heritage for an inspiring future. Berlin: Quintessence. ISBN 978-3-86867-483-5
- Gross, Dominik (2020–2024). Lexikon der Zahnärzte und Kieferchirurgen im "Dritten Reich" und im Nachkriegsdeutschland. Vol.1-3. Berlin: Hentrich & Hentrich2. ISBN 978-3-95565-500-6, ISBN 978-3-95565-567-9, ISBN 978-3-95565-663-8
- Biermanns, Nico; Gross, Dominik (2022). Pathologen als Verfolgte des Nationalsozialismus. 100 Portraits. Stuttgart: Steiner. ISBN 978-3-515-13138-4
- Gross, Dominik (2020). Curriculum Ethik und Geschichte der Zahnheilkunde unter Einbezug der Medizin. Berlin: Quintessence. ISBN 978-3-86867-621-1

=== Selected papers ===
- Mathias Schmidt, Jens Westemeier, Dominik Gross, The two lives of neurologist Helmut J. Bauer (1914-2008): Renowned MS specialist and National Socialist, Neurology 93/3 (2019), 109-113, doi:10.1212/WNL.0000000000007781
- Mathias Schmidt, Saskia Wilhelmy, Dominik Gross, Retrospective diagnosis of mental illness: past and present, The Lancet Psychiatry 7/1 (2020), 14-16, doi:10.1016/S2215-0366(19)30287-1
- Christiane E. Rinnen, Jens Westemeier, Dominik Gross, Nazi dentists on trial. On the political complicity of a long-neglected professional community, Endeavour 44/1-2 (2020), doi:10.1016/j.endeavour.2020.100710
- Cynthia Bergmann, Jens Westemeier, Dominik Gross, Dental editors and their role in the Third Reich and after 1945. A sociodemographic study, Journal of the History of Medicine and Allied Sciences 76 (2021), jrab045, doi:10.1093/jhmas/jrab045
- Hendrik Uhlendahl, Nico Biermanns, Janina Sziranyi, Dominik Groß, Success or failure? Pathologists persecuted under National Socialism and their careers after emigrating to the United States, Pathology – Research and Practice 218 (2021), 153315, doi:10.1016/j.prp.2020.153315
- Saskia Wilhelmy, Rebecca Ulrich, Dominik Gross, Just two sides of the same coin? Ethical issues and discourses on COVID-19 and Ebola. A comparative literature analysis, Historical Social Research 46/3 (2021), 247-284, doi:10.12759/hsr.46.2021.3.247-284
- Theresa Duckwitz, Dominik Gross, Searching for motives: Suicides of doctors and dentists in the Third Reich and the postwar period (1933-1949), Endeavour 46 (2022), 100800, doi:10.1016/j.endeavour.2021.100800
- Dominik Gross, Saskia Wilhelmy, The recent ethics boom in dentistry - moral fig leaf, fleeting trend or professional awakening? Clinical Oral Investigations 27/12 (2023), 7935-7940, doi:10.1007/s00784-023-05312-8
- Saskia Wilhelmy, Giancarlo Giupponi, Dominik Groß, Klaus Eisendle, Andreas Conca, A shift in psychiatry through AI? Ethical challenges, Annals of General Psychiatry 22 (2023), 43,doi:10.1186/s12991-023-00476-9
- Nataliya Sira, Marie Decker, Clara Lemke, Ann-Kristin Winkens, Carmen Leicht- Scholten, Dominik Gross, Teaching Scientific Integrity in Academia: What and How Students Want to Learn?. Journal of Academic Ethics 22 (2024), doi:10.1007/s10805-024-09527-6
