= Hieronymus Praetorius (theologian) =

German Lutheran clergyman, theologian, physicist and university professor (1595–1651)

Hieronymus Praetorius the Younger (also Schultze; 25 November 1595 – 23 December 1651) was a German Lutheran clergyman, theologian, physicist and university professor.

== Biography ==
Praetorius was born in 1595 in Hamburg, into a family of musicians. He was the son of Hieronymus Praetorius (1560 – 1629). His grandfather, the father of Hieronymus, Jacob Praetorius the Elder (c. 1520 – 1586), his older brother Jacob Praetorius the Younger (1586 – 1651) and his twin brother Johann Praetorius (1595 – 1660) were composers. He first attended school in Hamburg, then school in Hanover. Afterward, he went to study at the University of Wittenberg, where he graduated with a Master's degree in 1618. He then transferred to the University of Jena, where he studied under Johann Gerhard, among others. In 1622, he received a position as an assistant professor in the Faculty of Philosophy, in 1626 as a professor of ethics and politics, and in 1631 as a professor of physics.

When Duke Bernard of Saxe-Weimar became Duke of Franconia in 1633, Praetorius received the position of first Protestant superintendent of Würzburg from the duke. He also became a professor of theology at the University of Würzburg. Following the Battle of Nördlingen in September 1634, he was forced to flee and found refuge with his family in the Carthusian monastery in Erfurt. Duke William of Saxe-Weimar appointed him court preacher in Weimar.

In 1637, Praetorius came to Schleusingen. There he served as superintendent, consistorial assessor, professor of theology, and headteacher of the Schleusingen gymnasium. Finally, in 1642, he became superintendent and pastor of Schmalkalden. He declined offers of court chaplaincy or professorship from Braunschweig, Jena, Frankfurt am Main, and Regensburg.

He died in 1651 in Schmalkalden. His son-in-law was the theologian Johannes Andreas Olearius (1639 – 1684).

== Writing ==
- In Petitionem nonnullorum Ex Praeceptis & Canonibus constructum. Weidner, Jena 1626
- Canonum Metaphysicorum Pars Generalis. Weidner, Jena 1626
- Exercitium Politicum De Aristocratia. Weidner, Jena 1629
- Philosophiae Practicae, Pars Communis Et Specialis. Reiffenberg, Jena 1638
- Theatrum Ethicum & Politicum. Brickner, Jena 1663

== Sources ==
- Jöcher, Christian Gottlieb, ed. (1751). Allgemeines Gelehrten-Lexicon [General Scholars' Lexicon] (in German). Vol. 3: M–R. Leipzig: Johann Friedrich Gleditsch. col. 1749–1750.
- Allgemeine Deutsche Biographie [General German Biography] (in German). Vol. 26. Leipzig: Duncker & Humblot. 1888. p. 517.
