= Hieronymus Praetorius =

German composer and organist (1560-1629)

- Born: 10 August 1560; Hamburg, Germany
- Died: 27 January 1629 (aged 68); Hamburg, Germany
- Occupations: Composer and organist
- Children: Jacob Praetorius the Younger; Hieronymus Praetorius the Younger; Johann Praetorius

Hieronymus Praetorius the Elder (10 August 1560 – 27 January 1629) was a Northern German composer and organist of the late Renaissance and early Baroque whose polychoral motets in 8 to 20 voices are intricate and vividly expressive. Some of his organ music survives in the Visby Orgel-Tabulatur, which dates from 1611. (He was not related to the prolific Michael Praetorius, known as a theorist and for Terpsichore, but the large Praetorius family tree produced many distinguished musicians during the 16th and 17th centuries.)

== Life ==
He was born in Hamburg and spent most of his life there. He studied organ with his father (Jacob Praetorius the Elder (1520-1586), also a composer), before moving to Cologne for further study. In 1580 he became organist in Erfurt but remained there only two years. After returning to Hamburg in 1582 he worked with his father as assistant organist at Sankt Jacobi, becoming principal organist in 1586 when his father died, a post he retained until his own death 43 years later. His son, Jacob, was born that same year, and was also destined to become a composer. His younger son Johann was also a composer and organist. His other son Hieronymus became a theologian. In 1596 Hieronymus visited Gröningen where he met Michael Praetorius and Hans Leo Hassler; presumably he became acquainted with their music and, through them, the music of the contemporary Venetian School.

== Music and influence ==
Praetorius wrote Masses and ten settings of the Magnificat in addition to the mostly Latin polychoral motets. Much of his music uses voices divided into several groups, probably the first of its kind in Northern Germany in polychoral style; choir sizes range from 8 to 20, with the voices divided into two, three or four groups. Praetorius must have had sophisticated musicians at his disposal, considering both the amount and the difficulty of music he wrote for these ensembles. While progressive in writing in the Venetian style, he was conservative in using Latin and avoiding the basso continuo, which was eagerly adopted by many other contemporary German composers. Most of his vocal music is a cappella.

Praetorius was also the first composer to compile a collection of four-part German chorales with organ accompaniment, a sound which was to become a standard in Protestant churches for several centuries. The music in the collection was compiled from four churches in Hamburg; 21 of the 88 settings are of his own composition. Some of his organ compositions survive, including nine settings of the Magnificat, which are in a highly contrapuntal cantus firmus style. In addition to these settings, numerous anonymous pieces in north German collections of the time are now attributed with reasonable certainty to Hieronymus Praetorius.

== References and further reading ==
- Article "Hieronymus Praetorius," in The New Grove Dictionary of Music and Musicians, ed. Stanley Sadie. 20 vol. London, Macmillan Publishers Ltd., 1980. ISBN 1-56159-174-2
- Manfred Bukofzer, Music in the Baroque Era. New York, W.W. Norton & Co., 1947. ISBN 0-393-09745-5
