= Heidelberg Tun =

Extremely large wine barrel

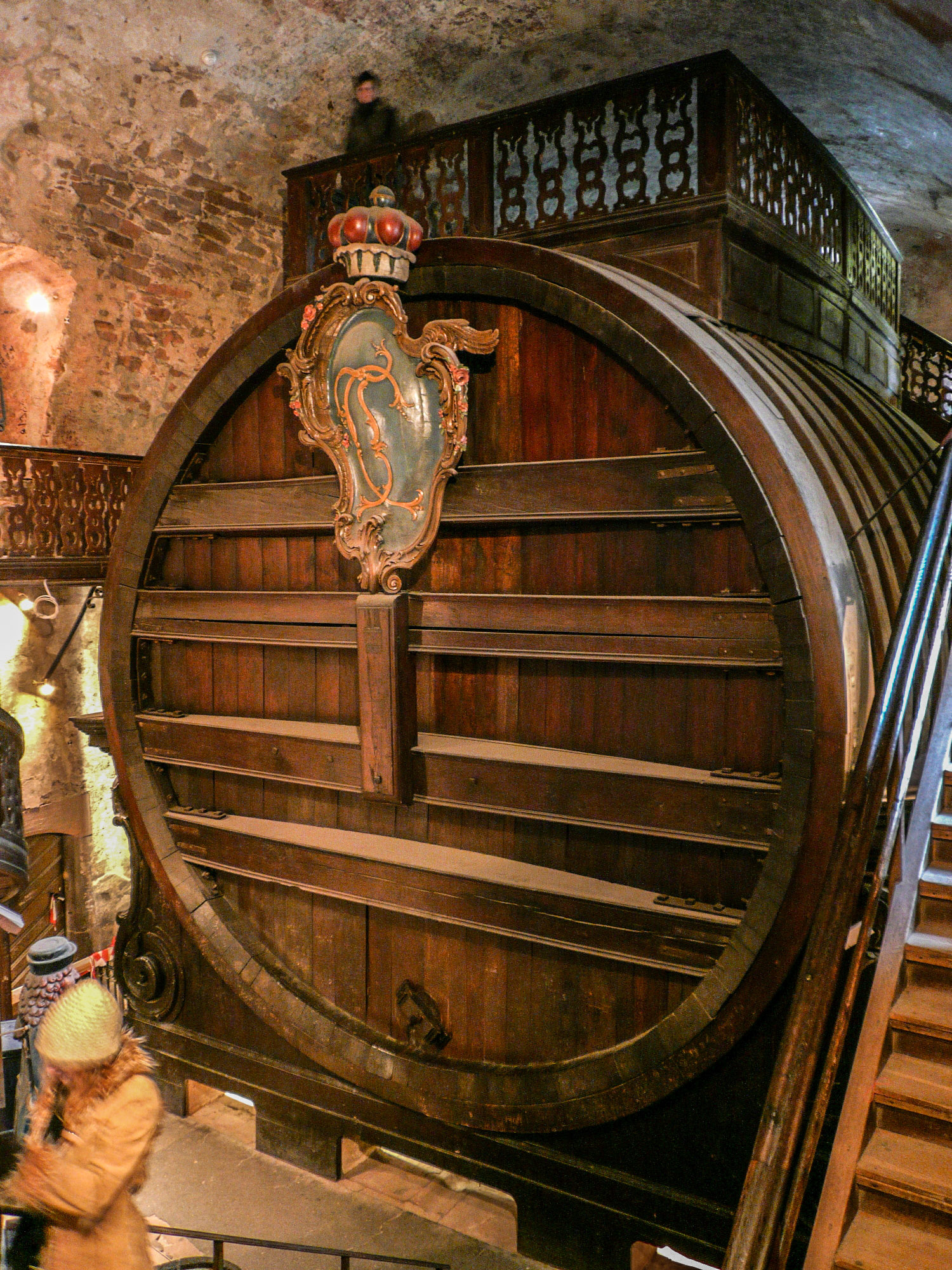

The Heidelberg Tun (German: Großes Fass), or Great Heidelberg Tun, is an extremely large wine vat contained within the cellars of Heidelberg Castle. There have been four such barrels in the history of Heidelberg. In 1751, the year of its construction, the present one had a capacity of 221,726 litres (58,574 U.S. gallons). Due to the drying of the wood its current capacity is 219,000 litres (57,854 U.S. gallons). One hundred and thirty oak trees were reputedly used in its construction. It has only rarely been used as a wine barrel, and in fact presently enjoys more use as a tourist attraction, and also as a dance floor since one was constructed on top of the tun.

== History ==
Heidelberg's large wine barrel

Heidelberg Castle has a history of enormous barrels; today's barrel (Fass) is the fourth in the history of the Neckar town.

1. Johann-Casimir-Fass (1591)
2. Karl-Ludwig-Fass (1664)
3. Karl-Philipp-Fass (1728)
4. Karl-Theodor-Fass (1751)

When the French army captured the castle, the soldiers believed the empty wine barrel to be full of wine; their hatchet marks left on the barrel were later visible to tourists. According to tradition and local legend, the eternal keeper of the enormous Tun remains Perkeo of Heidelberg, once a court jester and master of the castle's spirit production (and a famously Herculean wine drinker).

The tun is commemorated by a gable stone called T Heydel Berghs Vadt which was originally at Rokin 90, Amsterdam but has been moved to Kolksteeg 12.

== The barrel in literature ==
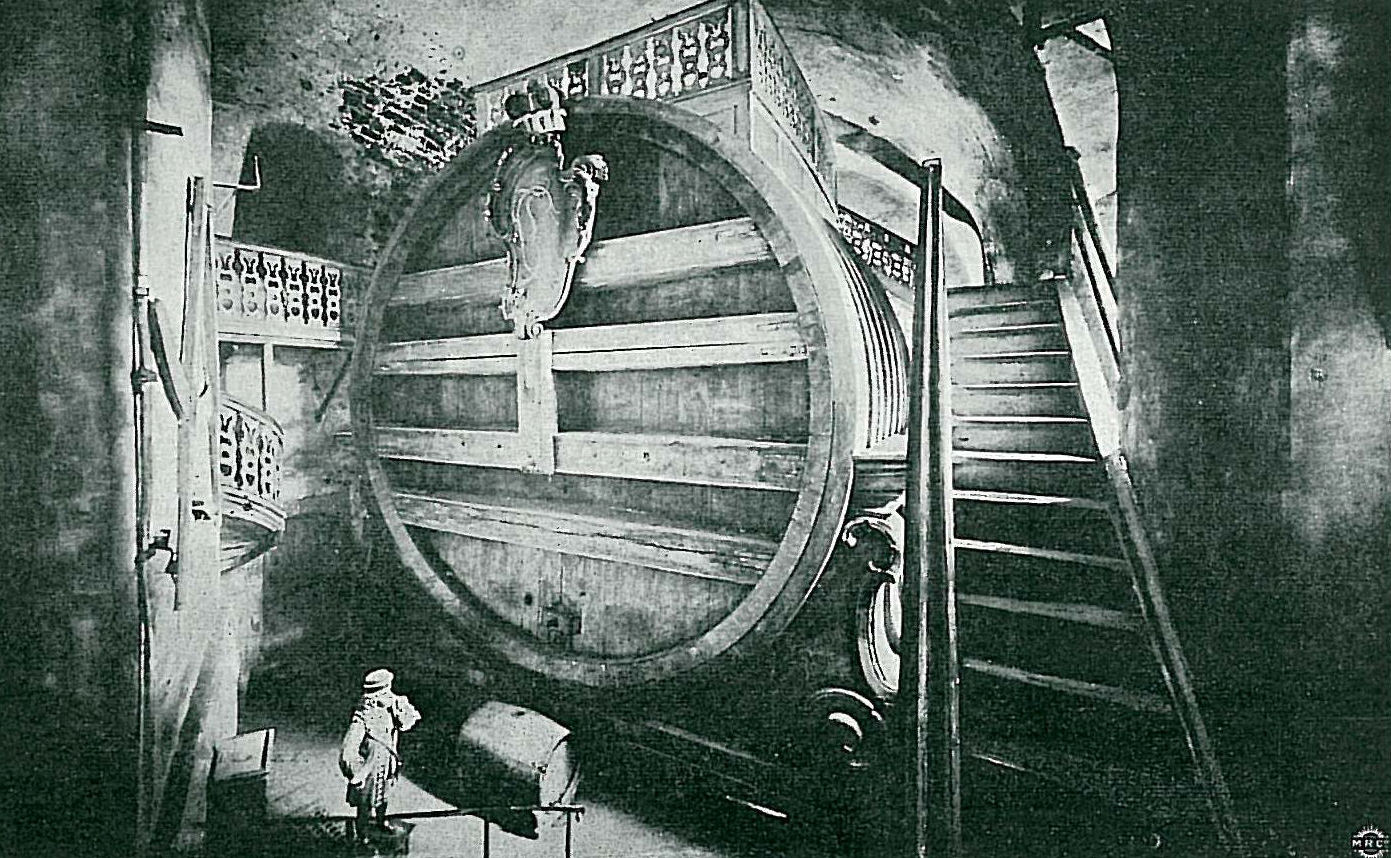
The Tun, c. 1900.

The Tun is referenced in Rudolf Erich Raspe's The Surprising Adventures of Baron Munchausen, Jules Verne's novel Five Weeks in a Balloon, Victor Hugo's Les Misérables, Washington Irving's The Specter Bridegroom, Mary Hazelton Wade's Bertha, Mark Twain's A Tramp Abroad and Wilhelm Busch's Die fromme Helena. It can also be found in Herman Melville's Moby-Dick as well as in Lyrisches Intermezzo by Heinrich Heine, later used in the song cycle Dichterliebe by Robert Schumann for the final song "Die alten, bösen Lieder (The old evil songs)". Ezra Pound made reference to the Heidelberg Tun and to the legendary Perkeo in Canto LXXX of The Pisan Cantos (published 1948). The vast but empty vat, purposeless and deprived of its original use, is made to "rhyme" with the emptiness of war and the poet's own need to be filled with human companionship, of which he was deprived while incarcerated in the US Army Detention Center outside Pisa, Italy.

The English writer Jerome K. Jerome visited it in 1890, during his return trip from Oberammergau:

What there is of interest in the sight of a big beer-barrel it is difficult, in one's calmer moments, to understand; but the guide books says that it is a thing to be seen, and so all we tourists go and stand in a row and gape at it.

— Jerome K. Jerome, Diary of a Pilgrimage, 1891

Anton Praetorius, the first Calvinistic pastor of the parochy of the wine-producing community of Dittelsheim, visited nearby Heidelberg, the centre of Calvin's theology in Germany. Impressed by the immensity of the Johann-Casimir-Fass, he wrote a poem in 1595 praising the barrel as an apparent proof of the superiority of Calvinism, entitled Vas Heidelbergense (Poem on the Great Wine Barrel in the Castle of Heidelberg).

Everybody has heard of the great Heidelberg Tun, and most people have seen it, no doubt. It is a wine-cask as big as a cottage, and some traditions say it holds eighteen thousand bottles, and other traditions say it holds eighteen hundred million barrels. I think it likely that one of these statements is a mistake, and the other is a lie. However, the mere matter of capacity is a thing of no sort of consequence, since the cask is empty, and indeed has always been empty, history says. An empty cask the size of a cathedral could excite but little emotion in me.

— Mark Twain, A Tramp Abroad, 1880
