= Marienkirche, Wolfenbüttel =

Marienkirche
- Hauptkirche Beatae Mariae Virginis
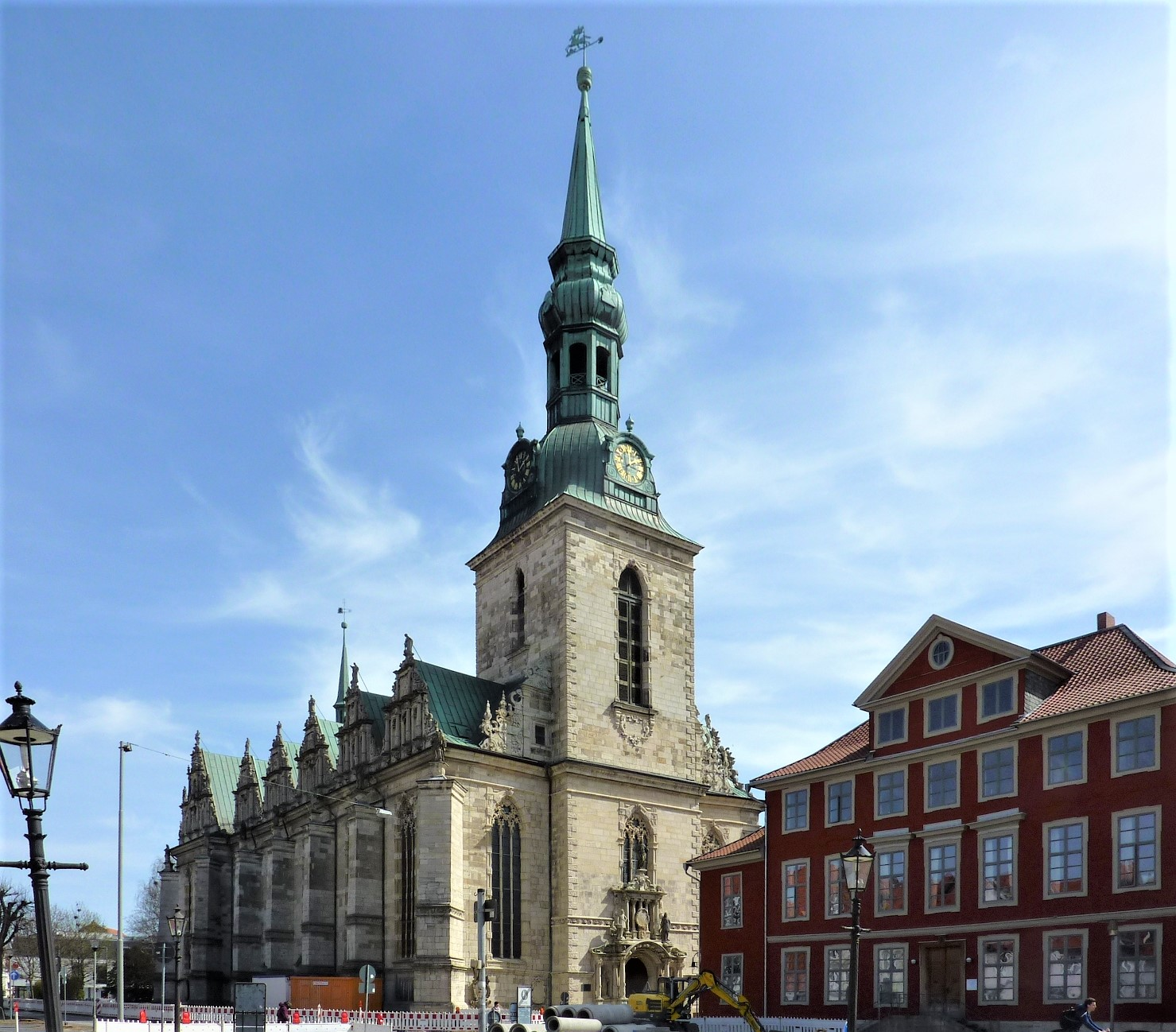
- Marienkirche
- 52°09′43″N 10°32′14″E
- Location: Wolfenbüttel, Lower Saxony
- Country: Germany
- Denomination: Lutheran

Architecture
- Years built: 1608

The Marienkirche is a main church (Hauptkirche) in Wolfenbüttel, Lower Saxony, Germany. The official name of the Lutheran church is Hauptkirche Beatae Mariae Virginis (Main church of the Blessed Virgin Mary). Short common names are Hauptkirche BMV, or simply BMV. It is regarded as the first major Protestant church. It was commissioned by Henry Julius, Duke of Brunswick-Lüneburg. Building began in 1608, directed by Baumeister Paul Francke. The portals in the north and south are attributed to Jacob Meyerheine.

== Burials ==
The composer Michael Praetorius, the writer Gottfried Wilhelm Sacer and the architect Paul Francke are buried in the church. The Fürstengruft below the choir contains the graves of 29 members of the ducal house of the Principality of Brunswick-Wolfenbüttel from the beginning of the 17th century to 1767.

== Literature ==
- Hans-Herbert Müller (ed.): Die Hauptkirche Beatae Mariae Virginis in Wolfenbüttel. in: Forschungen der Denkmalpflege in Niedersachsen vol. 4. 1st edition, Verlag CW Niemeyer, Hameln 1987
- Wolfram Kummer: Der Altar der Hauptkirche Beatae Mariae Virginis in Wolfenbüttel, in: Hans-Herbert Möller (ed.): Restaurierung von Kulturdenkmalen. Beispiele aus der niedersächsischen Denkmalpflege (= Berichte zur Denkmalpflege, appendix 2), Niedersächsisches Landesverwaltungsamt – Institut für Denkmalpflege, Hameln: Niemeyer, 1989, ISBN 3-87585-152-8, p. 297–307
