= In dulci jubilo (Praetorius) =

Compositions for Christmas by Praetorius

- Vocal compositions by Michael Praetorius
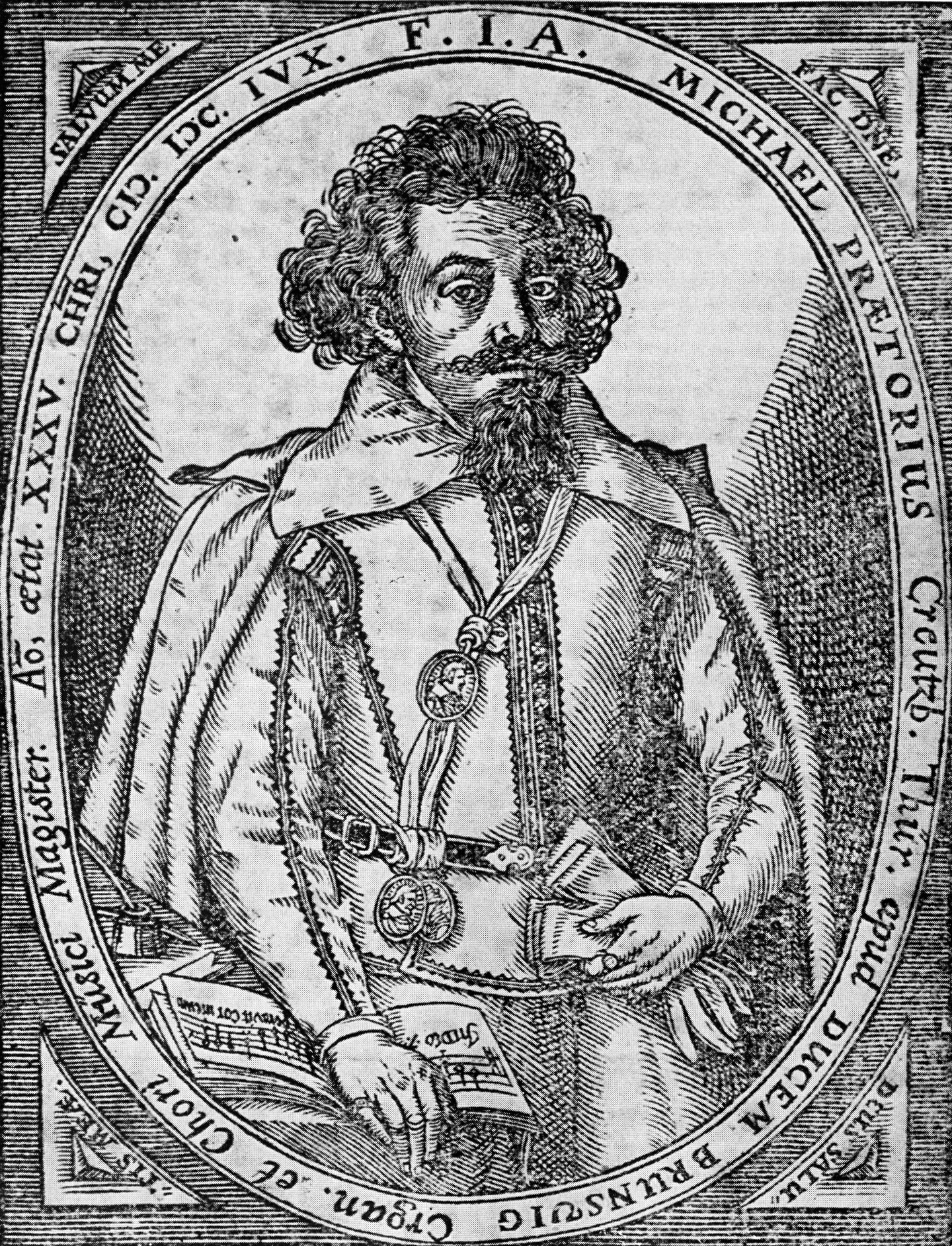
- English: In sweet rejoicing
- Text: "In dulci jubilo"
- Composed: 1607–1619

In dulci jubilo (In sweet rejoicing) is the title of several compositions for voices by Michael Praetorius, setting the Christmas carol "In dulci jubilo". He published them in various parts of his collections Musae Sioniae in 9 volumes. A version for double choir appears in Part 2 of 1607.

== History ==
Praetorius published several settings of In dulci jubilo for Lutheran church services between 1607 and 1619. They are all based in text and tune on the medieval Christmas carol "In dulci jubilo", a song in macaronic text that alternates Latin and German. It was part of the 1545 hymnal Babstsches Gesangbuch and in 1582 of a Swedish hymnal, Piae cantiones.

At Praetorius' time, Christmas was prepared by the silent time of Advent, making the music for the Christmas service more outstanding. Praetorius was open to using songs written before the Reformation, such as "In dulci jubilo" and "Es ist ein Ros entsprungen", the latter with a focus on venerating Mary. He expected instruments to support and sometimes even replace voices, but which instruments was not prescribed and left room to adjust a performance to the available musicians and the acoustics of a church. His compositions for several choirs are based by models from the Venetian polychoral style, with choirs positioned at different places in the church.

Praetorius published a version for double choir in his collection Musae Sioniae, Part II, No. 5, in 1607, a setting for two voices in V as No. 84 in 1607, another for two voices in IX as No. 12 in 1610, a setting for four voices in VI in 1609, and another, and a setting for 20 voices in Polyhymnia caduceatrix et panegyrica as No. 34 in 1619.

== Music ==
In the version for double choir, Praetorius set only the first stanza of the song. In a dialogue of the two choirs, he evoked communal rejoicing, which Owen Rees described as "an exuberant exercise in reworking and varying the melodic phrases of the traditional melody".
