= Traudl Kleefeld =

German Protestant modern philologist, historian and author (1936–2024)

Traudl (Gertraud) Kleefeld, née Herrmann (August 17, 1936 in Bayreuth – February 27, 2024 in Erlangen), was a German modern philologist, historian, author and volunteer in the Protestant Church.

== Biography ==
In 1954, she began studying modern languages (French/English) in Tübingen and Erlangen. In 1959, she passed the first state examination for teaching in Erlangen and, in 1961, the second state examination for teaching in Bamberg. From 1961 to 1964, she was a study assessor, then a senior teacher at the Oberrealschule in Bad Windsheim. While studying in Tübingen in 1957, she met her husband, Hans-Gernot Max Georg Kleefeld, born on June 28, 1935 in Breslau. They married on October 27, 1962 in Neuenmarkt.

Kleefeld died at the age of 87 on February 27, 2024, and was buried in the Neustädter Cemetery in Erlangen.

== Missionary work in Africa ==
In 1962, the regional synod of the Evangelical Lutheran Church in Bavaria, following a request from the Lutheran World Federation, decided to support the missionary work of the Lutheran Church in Tanzania and sent Kleefeld and his wife as the first Bavarian pastor to an African partner church.

Kleefeld was placed under the leadership of the Lutheran Church of South Tanganyika. During the first phase, the family lived at the mission station in Brandt/Usangu from 1964 to 1968, overseeing missionary work there. During the second phase in Tanzania, they worked in Kidugala/Ubena from 1969 to 1972. Traudl Kleefeld occasionally preached, worked as a volunteer instructor at the Evangelists' School, and was involved in women's ministry in the congregation.

== Voluntary activities ==
After her return, she taught English in Neuendettelsau from 1972 to 1981 and gave lectures on missionary and women's work. She always considered herself a networker and was committed to women's issues. Her particular focus was on women's and educational work. In Erlangen she worked from 1982 to 2000 as church warden in the St. Markus in the Evangelical Lutheran Deanery of Erlangen in the Nuremberg Church District in the Evangelical Lutheran Church in Bavaria and took over the leadership of the congregation's women's group.

In Tanzania she had become acquainted with the World Day of Prayer and got involved in this largest ecumenical movement in the world. From 1982 to 2009, she was a member of the editorial team in the German Committee of the World Day of Prayer for Women.

== Historical Research on Witch Hunts ==
Since 1987 she conducted intensive research about the history of witch hunts, particularly in the Margraviate of Brandenburg-Ansbach and Sugenheim. With great energy and dedication she devoted herself to this bitter chapter of "women's history." In 2011, she published the book "Witch Memorials of Franconia." In this publication, she presented ten places in the Franconia region where memorials or monuments commemorate the victims of the witch trials.

Based on her research, several towns installed a memorial plaque or a memorial stone for the victims of the witch trials. She was member of the editorial team of the Synod of the Evangelical Lutheran Church in Bavaria in 1997, responsible for the statement on the church's shared responsibility for the witch trials.

She was active in the presentation of the working group informing about the persecution of witches with pastor Hartmut Hegeler at the Church Congresses. At the 2010 Ecumenical Church Congress in Munich, she participated in conducting the memorial service for the victims of the witch trials in the Herz-Jesu-Kirche.

In 2017, she was invited by Wolfgang Behringer, Professor of Early Modern History at Saarland University, to present her research results on memorials for the victims of the witch trials at the conference of the Working Group for Interdisciplinary Witch Research (Arbeitskreis Interdisziplinäre Hexenforschung = AKIH) at the Academy of the Diocese of Rottenburg-Stuttgart together with Hartmut Hegeler.

== Award ==
Her diverse voluntary work was recognized in 2021 with the Bavarian Primeminister's Decoration of Honor for services rendered by women and men in voluntary work.

== Publications ==
- Aufbau und Praxis der Höheren Schulen in Frankreich. In: Jahresbericht 1962/63 Humanistisches Gymnasium mit Oberrealschule Bad Windsheim.
- Ein Gebet geht um die Welt – 100 Jahre Weltgebetstag. In: Unser Auftrag. Zeitschrift für Mitarbeiter in der Kirche. Nr. 1 München, 1987.
- Zur Geschichte der Hexenverfolgungen. In: Hexenverfolgung. Eine Stellungnahme aus der Evangelisch-Lutherischen Kirche in Bayern. Im Auftrag der Evang.–Luth. Kirche in Bayern herausgegeben von Fritz Anders, Traudl Kleefeld und Joachim Track. München 1997. S. 19–33.
- Margaretha Bucklin — Eine Frauengeschichte aus dem 16. Jahrhundert im lutherischen Markgrafentum Ansbach. In: Und sie traten aus dem Schatten (Hrsg. Frauengleichstellungsstelle der Evang.-Luth. Kirche in Bayern). München 1999. S. 45–50.
- Mit Hans Gräser, Gernot Stepper: Hexenverfolgung im Markgraftum Brandenburg-Ansbach und in der Herrschaft Sugenheim. Mittelfränkische Studien im Auftrag des Historischen Vereins für Mittelfranken. Ansbach 2001.
- Wann das Trudenwerckh nicht so gar gros und überhand genommen hette ... Hexenverfolgung im 16. und 17. Jahrhundert. In: Geschichte der Frauen in Mittelfranken (Hrsg. Nadja Bennewitz und Gaby Franger). Cadolzburg. 2003, S. 120–127.
- Ampts und gewissens halben Der lutherische Pfarrer in Ezelheim und der Hexenverdacht in seiner Gemeinde (1611). In: Hexenwahn – Eine theologische Selbstbesinnung (Hrsg. Renate Jost, Marcel Nieden) Stuttgart 2004. S. 109–126.
- Unter Schirmakazien und Eukalyptusbäumen – Lehrjahre in Südtanzania. In: Stehet auf, ihr stolzen Frauen (Hrsg. Frauengleichstellungsstelle der Evang.-Luth. Kirche in Bayern), München 2004, S. 93–100.
- Einladung zum Festgottesdienst 60 Jahre Frauenkreis St. Markus, Erlangen 2013
- Hexengedenken in Franken. Korrespondenzblatt Nr. 4, April 2011, hrsg. Vom Pfarrer- und Pfarrerinnenverein in der evangelisch-lutherischen Kirche in Bayern, 126. Jg. S. 61–64.
- Hexenverfolgungen in den lutherischen Herrschaftsgebieten in Franken. In: Hexenwahn in Franken (Hrsg. Markus Mergenthaler u. Margarete Klein-Pfeuffer im Auftrag des Knauf-Museums Iphofen), Dettelbach 2014, S. 244–261.
- Hexen Gedenken in Franken. Gedenkstätten für Opfer der Hexenverfolgung in Franken. Röllverlag, 2016. ISBN 978-3897544840
- Wider das Vergessen — Hexenverfolgung in Franken – Stätten des Gedenkens. Dettelbach 2016. 978-3-89754-484-0
- Margaretha Bucklin. Eine Frauengeschichte aus dem 16. Jahrhundert im lutherischen Markgraftum Ansbach. Neu überarbeitete Auflage, 2016.
- Hexenverfolgung im Markgraftum Ansbach. In: Hexenverfolgung im Bistum Eichstätt (Symposium des Eichstätter Diözesangeschichtsvereins am 12./13. Oktober 2018 in Eichstätt). Beiträge zur Geschichte der Diözese Eichstätt, Band 2. EOS Editions Sankt Ottilien 2020.
