= Hartmut Hegeler =

German Protestant pastor and author

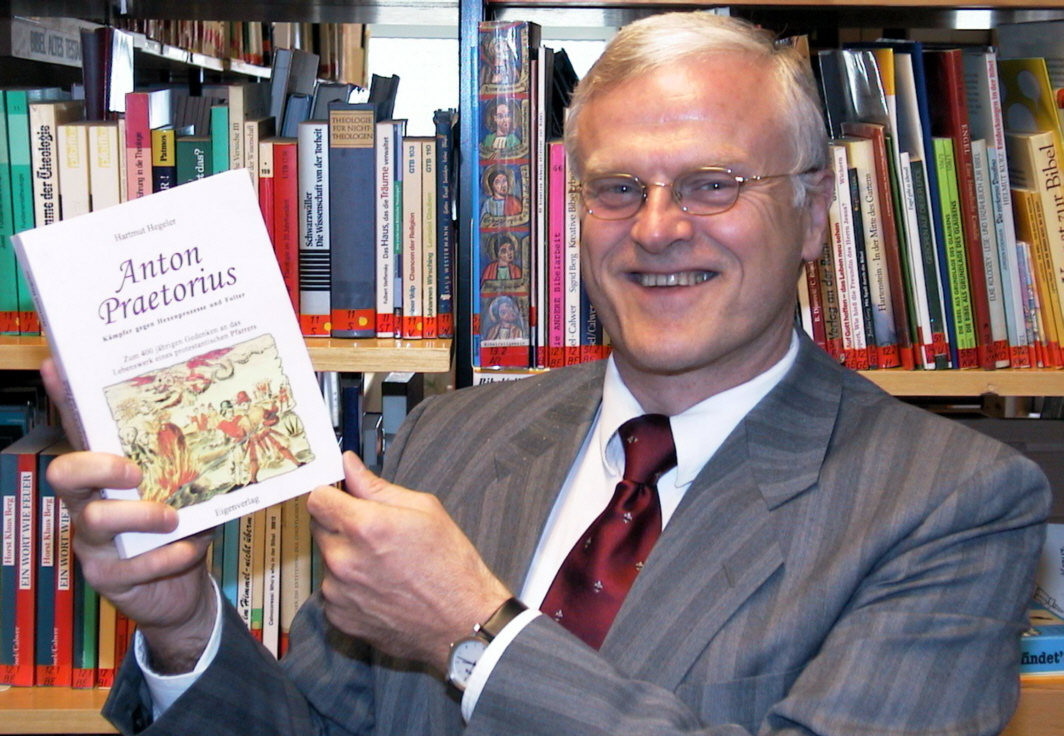
Hartmut Hegeler

Hartmut Hegeler (born 11 June 1946 in Bremen) is a German Protestant pastor and author, who is committed to rehabilitating the victims of the witch hunts in Europe which reached a peak during the early seventeenth century. He has a homepage about Anton Praetorius.

== Biography ==
Hegeler attended school in Bielefeld and was an exchange student in Senior High School in Renton, Washington in 1964. He studied theology in Germany in Bethel, at the university of Marburg and Heidelberg. As a vicar of the Evangelical Church of Westphalia he was in India. Here he made a survey of an irrigation project of the Tamilnad Christian Council by Joseph John and Lüder Lüers. As pastor he served in Recklinghausen. 1974-1976 he worked in the field of development aid in North Yemen. 1976-1982 he was parish pastor in Dortmund, afterwards he worked as a pastor and religious education teacher in a vocational training college in Unna, North Rhine-Westphalia, where he lives. Since 2010 he is retired.

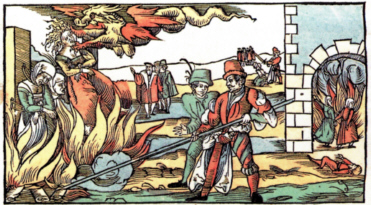
Persecution of witches

Questions of his students in 2001 about the persecution of witches were the impulse for his studies on this subject: writing books and holding lectures. He is fighting for the exoneration of the victims of the witchcraft trials, that they should be given back their dignity as human beings and as Christians. Places of remembrance should give witness to their fate. At the 2010 Ecumenical Church Congress in Munich he was supported by Traudl Kleefeld in conducting the memorial service for the victims of the witch trials in the Herz-Jesu-Kirche. There have been many reports in the media about his activities.

== Publications ==
- Literature by and about Hartmut Hegeler in the German National Library catalogue
- "Anton Pretorius" Homepage of Hegeler about witchcraft trials
- Hegeler in the lexicon of authors in Westphalia
- List of his publications in German
- Rittersitz in Unna-Massen. Geschichte des adligen Rittergeschlechts von Romberg und Haus Massen. Schriftenreihe der Stadt Unna 66, 2025
