= Wilhelm de Raet =

16th century Dutch engineer and builder

Wilhelm de Raet (c. 1537, 's-Hertogenbosch, Southern Netherlands – 1583, Tuscany, Italy) was a Dutch hydraulic engineer and master builder, most notable for his work in Lucca in Italy.

== Life ==
He was living in Antwerp in the Spanish Netherlands in 1574 when he was summoned to the Duchy of Brunswick-Lüneburg by its duke Julius to advise him on canals, particularly the one Julius hoped to build between the Elbe and Oker rivers. He also wanted de Raet to work on the expansion of the new Heinrichstadt quarter in his capital Wolfenbüttel. de Raet had already worked on similar projects in Spain and Italy, such as draining 1,600 hectares of a lake at Massaciuccoli in the Republic of Lucca, for which he had purpose-designed a new device.

de Raet arrived in Wolfenbüttel in late summer 1574 and immediately began lengthening the Oker. Julius was unable to get the state council to finance his projects and so in 1575 he signed a contract with de Raet making him his personal "master builder on water and on land" and requiring de Raet to spend three months of each year in Wolfenbüttel and to found a company to construct and operate the planned canal between the Harz and the North Sea. Julius hoped to use the canal to make Wolfenbüttel a trading centre and thus strengthen its political position, since the canal would divert regional trade through Wolfenbüttel. de Raet and his successor Hans Vredemann de Vries installed extensive hydraulic engineering to regulate the flow of the Oker and thus make it navigable.

The initial plan was to make the Oker navigable between the Harz and Brunswick and expanding its flow into the Elm Nette. However, this was extended to connect the Oker with the Großes Bruch on the Elbe. This would connect Wolfenbüttel to Antwerp and bring the transport time between the two down to 18–20 days. The Principality of Lüneburg and the town of Brunswick disapproved this improvement to Wolfenbüttel's political position and so the latter lodged a complaint in 1571. The city council of Brunswick also feared that the project would divert the trade in metal from themselves to Magdeburg. de Raet began to implement the Oker-Elbe plan, however, bypassing Brunswick. In 1577 he wrote a short pamphlet in support of the plan and accusing Brunswick of short-sightedness. Rudolf II, Holy Roman Emperor passed a decree putting an end to the project, but even so de Raet continued and enough of it was completed to enable the drawing of rafts to Wolfenbüttel on the Oker and Nette. However, he had to abandon the next phase, which had planned to push through the Braunschweiger Landwehr fortifications and get as far as the city limits of Brunswick. He attempted to replace it with a plan to link the Oker to the Aller via the Aue, Erse and Fuhse, but this was successfully opposed by William the Younger, Duke of Brunswick-Lüneburg.

de Raet was also put in charge of regulating the flow of the Oker and Innerste south of Wolfenbüttel in Richtung towards the Harz, which he carried out from 1574 to 1577. He built the 10-metre-high (33 ft) and 57-metre-wide (187 ft) Julius-Staus dam in 1573, which kept the water level constant and thus enabled building materials and other goods to be transported by raft. He also collaborated with Paul Francke to modernise the defences at Schloss Wolfenbüttel, combining Italian methods such as brick with newer Dutch methods, such as using excavated soil, which was more cost-effective. In 1578 he produced a windmill and treadmill at the Silberne Schreibfeder coal mine at Julius' request. Sometime after 1577 he designed plans to regulate the flow of the Arno between Florence and the sea for Francesco I de' Medici, Grand Duke of Tuscany – this was initially at his own expense, though he was later paid 60,000 scudi for the design.

== Bibliography (in German) ==
- Otto von Heinemann: Herzog Julius von Braunschweig und seine Navigationspläne. In: Braunschweiger Magazin. 1898.
- Paul Zimmermann (Hrsg.): Jahrbuch des Geschichtsvereins für das Herzogtum Braunschweig. Zwißler, Wolfenbüttel 1903, S. 118. (archive.org)
- Oskar de Smedt: Wilhelm de Raet, Baumeister und Ingenieur (ca. 1537–1583). In: Friedrich Thöne (Hrsg.): Braunschweigisches Jahrbuch. Band 46, 1965, S. 147–150. digisrv-1.biblio.etc.tu-bs.de (PDF)
- Christian Lippelt: Raet, Wilhelm de. In: Horst-Rüdiger Jarck, Dieter Lent, etc. (ed.s): Braunschweigisches Biographisches Lexikon – 8. bis 18. Jahrhundert. Appelhans Verlag, Braunschweig 2006, ISBN 3-937664-46-7, pages 572–573.
- Viel Steins in der Radau (PDF, S. 4)
