= Perkeo of Heidelberg =

18th-century court jester

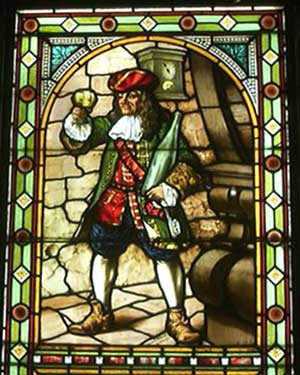
Stained glass painting of Perkeo shown with his three symbols: wine goblet, key and clock

Perkeo of Heidelberg (born Clemens Pankert; according to other sources, Giovanni Clementi; 1702–1735) was a court jester and court dwarf who served Elector Palatine Charles III Philip in Heidelberg. As custodian of the Great Heidelberg Tun, he became an enduring symbol of the city and the surrounding region. His name, legend, and likeness have since been associated with local festivals, traditional songs, cultural and scientific institutions, and numerous businesses, including hotels and restaurants, both within and beyond Heidelberg.

Perkeo’s famed fondness for wine and the Italian catchphrase "perché no?" ("why not?") made him a popular figure in regional folklore. His image and name recur in local culture and celebrations—particularly in carnival traditions such as the Fastnacht in Heidelberg and Perkeo’s Maschggra in Salorno (Salurn)—as well as in later commemorations and commercial uses.

== Life ==
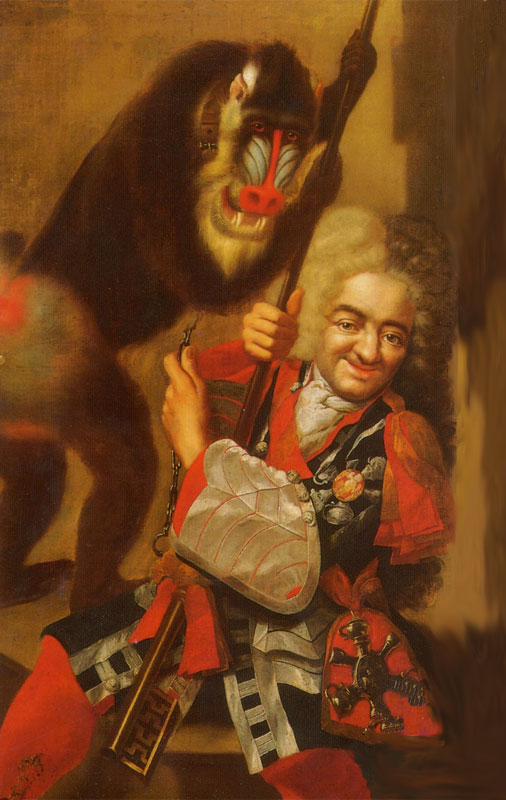
Perkeo and a mandrill

Pankert was apparently affected by dwarfism, possibly pseudoachondroplasia. He was born in Salurn in the County of Tyrol (present-day Salorno, South Tyrol) and originally practised as a button maker. Probably about 1718 he met with Charles III Philip, who had ruled as the Habsburg governor of the lands of Tyrol and Further Austria since 1712. Philip took an interest in Pankert, and when he became the ruler of the Electoral Palatinate, he brought him along to Heidelberg Castle as a cup-bearer and official entertainer for the court.

In Heidelberg, Pankert allegedly adopted the nickname "Perkeo" for his drinking habits, as he replied "perché no?" (“why not?” in Italian) many times after being asked if he wanted another glass of wine at various court events. Perkeo quickly became celebrated for his massive wine consumption despite his small figure. Contemporary accounts document that he regularly drank between five and eight US gallons (roughly 18 to 30 liters) of wine a day. Since he knew much about wine, he was also given the responsibility of looking after the castle's wine stocks. Many found amusement in the striking contrast that the diminutive Perkeo was in charge of the largest wine barrel in the world, the massive Heidelberg Tun, while having a strong love of drinking.

== Reception ==
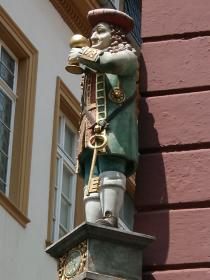
Perkeo statue in Heidelberg

Perkeo's fate was perpetuated in a letter by Victor Hugo (1802–1885), after his 1840 visit to Heidelberg Castle. Joseph Victor von Scheffel (1826–1886) added Perkeo's drinking song to his Gaudeamus collection, published in 1863. In Heidelberg, his commemoration is annually celebrated during the carnival (Fastnacht) season, likewise in Salorno (Maschggra).

The trademark PERKÊO for lamp components was registered under No. 1 by the German Imperial Patent Office on 16 October 1894 and is protected up to today. Perkeo is also the name of a historic inn in Heidelberg and of a Hedera helix (ivy) variety named in 1982. The PERKEO group at the Institute of Physics of the Heidelberg University examines free neutron decay.

== In popular culture ==
Perkeo is referenced in the Poker-themed video game Balatro. In the game, he is represented by a red-haired joker with a large green dress. His ability, making copies of consumables that do not take up space, is a nod to his ability to drink so much while being such a small person, as if what he drank wasn't taking up space in his body.

Between 1912 and up to 1933 Clemens Mueller A.G. based in Dresden , Germany produced a small fold-able typewriter which, when placed in its travelcase, was smaller than when in use. The case was approx. 33x33x15cm. The machine was named "Perkeo", clearly marked on the front.
