= Anton Praetorius =

German pastor

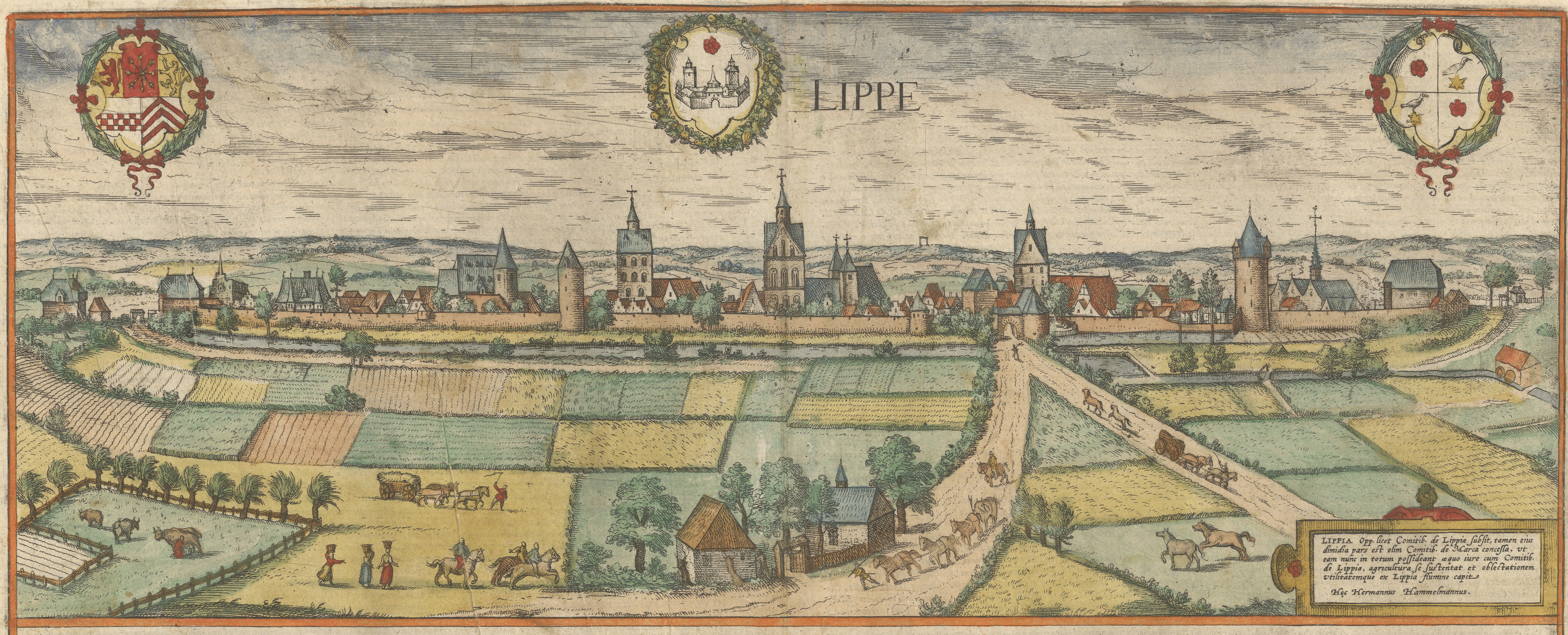
Lippstadt

Anton Praetorius (1560 – 6 December 1613) was a German Calvinist pastor who spoke out against the persecution of witches (witchhunts, witchcraft trials) and against torture.

== Life and writings ==
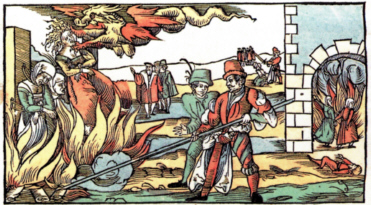
Persecution of witches

Praetorius was born in Lippstadt as the son of Matthes Schulze. He later changed his name to the Latin Praetorius. He studied theology and became principal of the humanistic Latin school in Kamen, Westphalia. There, he married, but his wife Maria died of the plague. They had one child, Johannes.

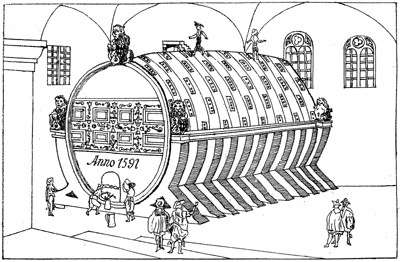
Heidelberg Castle Wine Barrel

As the first Calvinist pastor in the parish of Dittelsheim, he undertook a trip to Heidelberg, the centre of Calvinist theology in Germany. Praetorius was so impressed by the Great Wine Barrel in Heidelberg Castle that he published a poem with the title "Vas Heidelbergense" in October 1595, praising its size as an apparent proof of the superiority of the Calvinist religion.

In his poem on Wolfgang Ernst, Count of Ysenburg, Büdingen and Birstein ("De pii magistratus officio"), he asked the Christian governments for a reformation of nation and church along the principles of the Bible and the Calvinist faith. Subsequently, the count called him as a princely preacher to his castle in Birstein near Frankfurt.

In the town of Birstein, Praetorius published church songs, a catechism, and a book for families about Christian education in 1597. In 1602, he made a contribution to the discussion about the interpretation of the Last Supper and the Sacraments in his book De Sacrosanctis novi foederis Jesu Christi.

== Fight against the persecution of witches ==
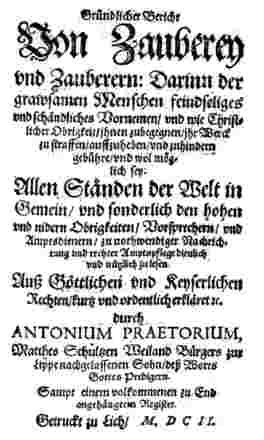
Praetorius Bericht Zauberey 1602

In 1597 Praetorius was appointed as pastor to the Count of Büdingen/ Ysenburg in Birstein and had to witness the torture of 4 women accused of witchcraft.

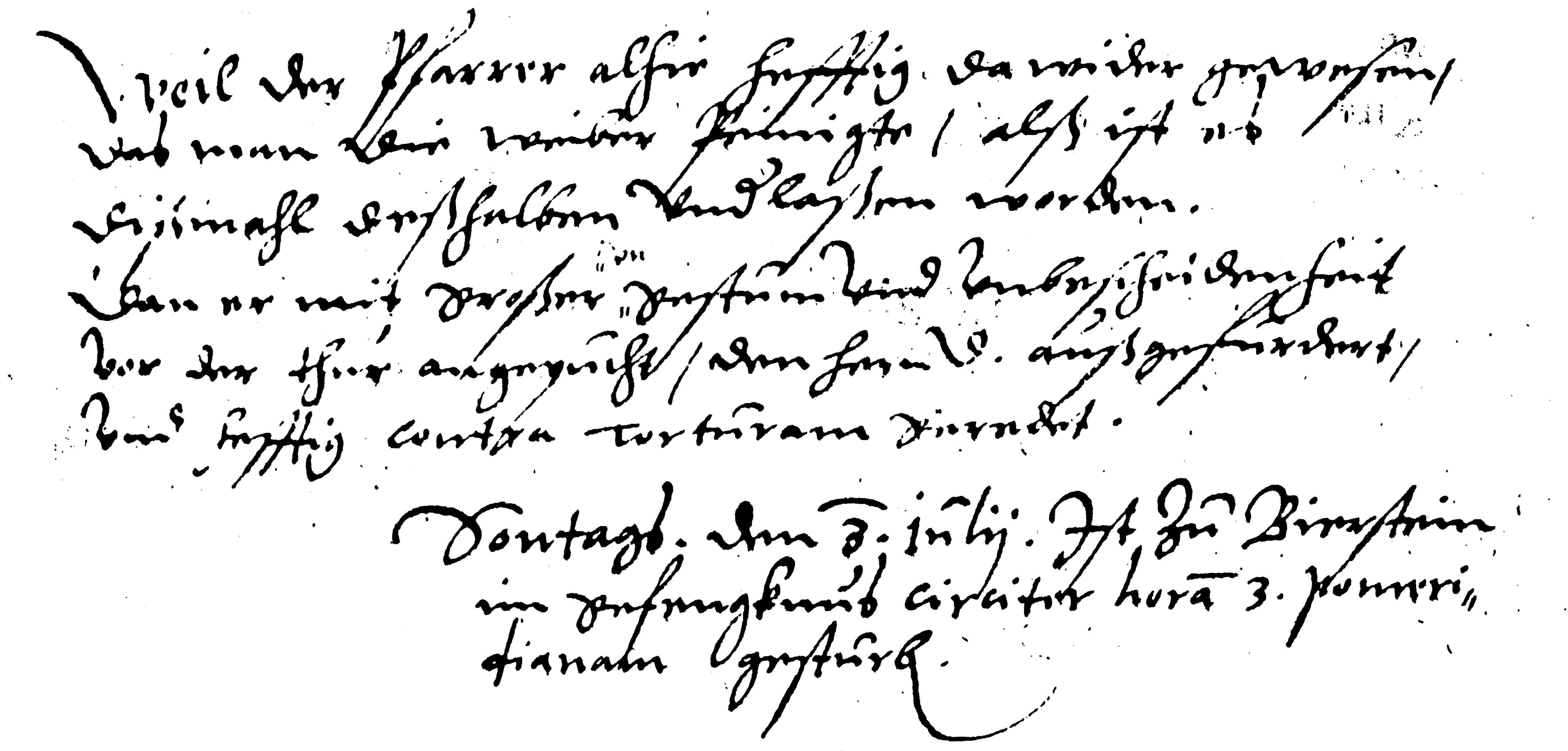
File Birstein Witchcraft Trial 1597

According to the court records, Reverend Praetorius was so upset about the torture of the accused women that he pressed for a stop in the trial against the last surviving woman. His protest against the torture can be found in the record of the witch-trial of Birstein 1597: "As the pastor has violently protested against the torture of the women, it has therefore been stopped this time." As a consequence Anton Praetorius was dismissed by the count.

In his new parochy in Laudenbach near Heidelberg he wrote the book Gründlicher Bericht über Zauberey und Zauberer (Thorough Report about Witchcraft and Witches) to protest against torture and the prosecution of witches. At first he published the book in 1598 under the name of his son Johannes Schulze ("Johannes Scultetus"). In 1602 he dared to publish the book under his own name. The book was published again in 1613 and posthumously in 1629.

Praetorius was one of the first to describe the terrible situation of the prisoners and to protest against torture, and with his "Bericht" Praetorius publicly objected to the prevailing attitude in the church (a view held by Roman Catholics as well as Protestants such as Martin Luther and John Calvin) on the torture and burning of witches. Praetorius died in Laudenbach.

== Publications (German and Latin) ==
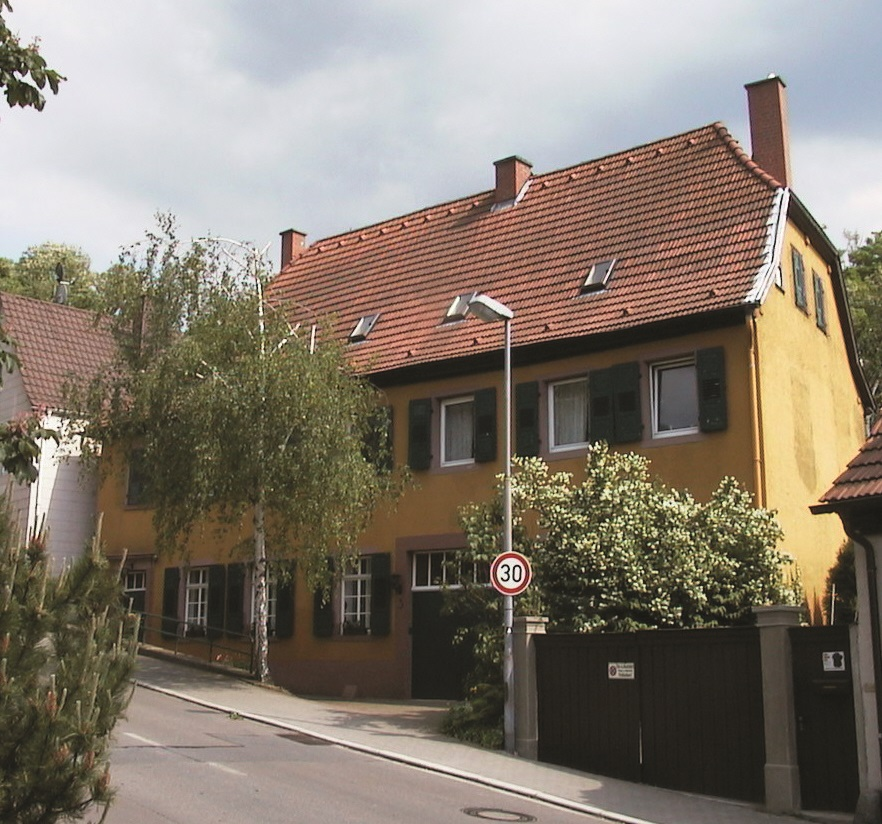
Laudenbach House of the Pastor

- Vas Heidelbergense, Heidelberg, October 1595 (Poem about the 1. Great Wine Barrel in the Castle of Heidelberg. Only one remaining print, translated into German by Burghard Schmanck)
- De pii magistratus officio (Poem on Wolfgang Ernst, Earl of Ysenburg, Büdingen and Birstein). Heidelberg, Printed by Christoph Löw, 1596 (Only one remaining print, translated into German by Burghard Schmanck)
- Hauptstück (catechism) Christlicher Religion sampt den gemeinesten Gebetlein/ und etlichen Fragen. Printed in Lich by Nicolaum Erbenium. 1597. Only one remaining print, fragment
- Haußgespräch, darinn kurtz doch klärlich vnd gründlich begriffen wirdt, was zu wahrer Christlicher Bekanntnuß auch Gottseligem Wandel ... zu wissen von nöhten, (conversation in the family about Christian education) Printed in Lich 1597
- Gründlicher Bericht von Zauberey und Zauberern/ darinn dieser grausamen Menschen feindtseliges und schändliches Vornemen/ und wie Christlicher Obrigkeit ihnen Zubegegnen/ ihr Werck zuhindern/ auffzuheben und zu Straffen / gebüre und wol möglich sey... kurtz und ordentlich erkläret. (Thorough Report about Witchcraft and Witches) By Joannem Scultetum Westphalo camensem. (Johannes Scultetum is a pseudonym of Anton Praetorius) printed in Lich by Nicolas Erbenis. 1598
- Clarissimo juris utriusque Doctori Domino Jano Grutero Sponso. Poem for the wedding of Jan Gruter, (translated into German by Burghard Schmanck) 1601 (Only one remaining print)
- Gründlicher Bericht von Zauberey und Zauberern: kurtz und ordentlich erkläret durch Antonium Praetorium, (Thorough Report about Witchcraft and Witches) printed in Lich/ 1602
- De Sacrosanctis novi foederis Jesu Christi (about the sacraments) printed by Wolgangus Kezelius and Conradus Nebenius, Lich 1602
- Nemo Ad Desideratissimas 15. Iunii.,1613 (Poem for a wedding of a pastor) Lancellotus Heidelberg (only one remaining print)
- Von Zauberey und Zauberern/ Gründlicher Bericht, (Thorough Report about Witchcraft and Witches) printed 1613 in Heidelberg by Johann Lancellot/ Andreae Cambier.
- Gründlicher Bericht, (Thorough Report about Witchcraft and Witches) printed 1629 in Frankfurt am Main by Johann Niclas Stoltzenbergern/ Johann Carl Unckels
- several handwritten letters

== Tributes ==
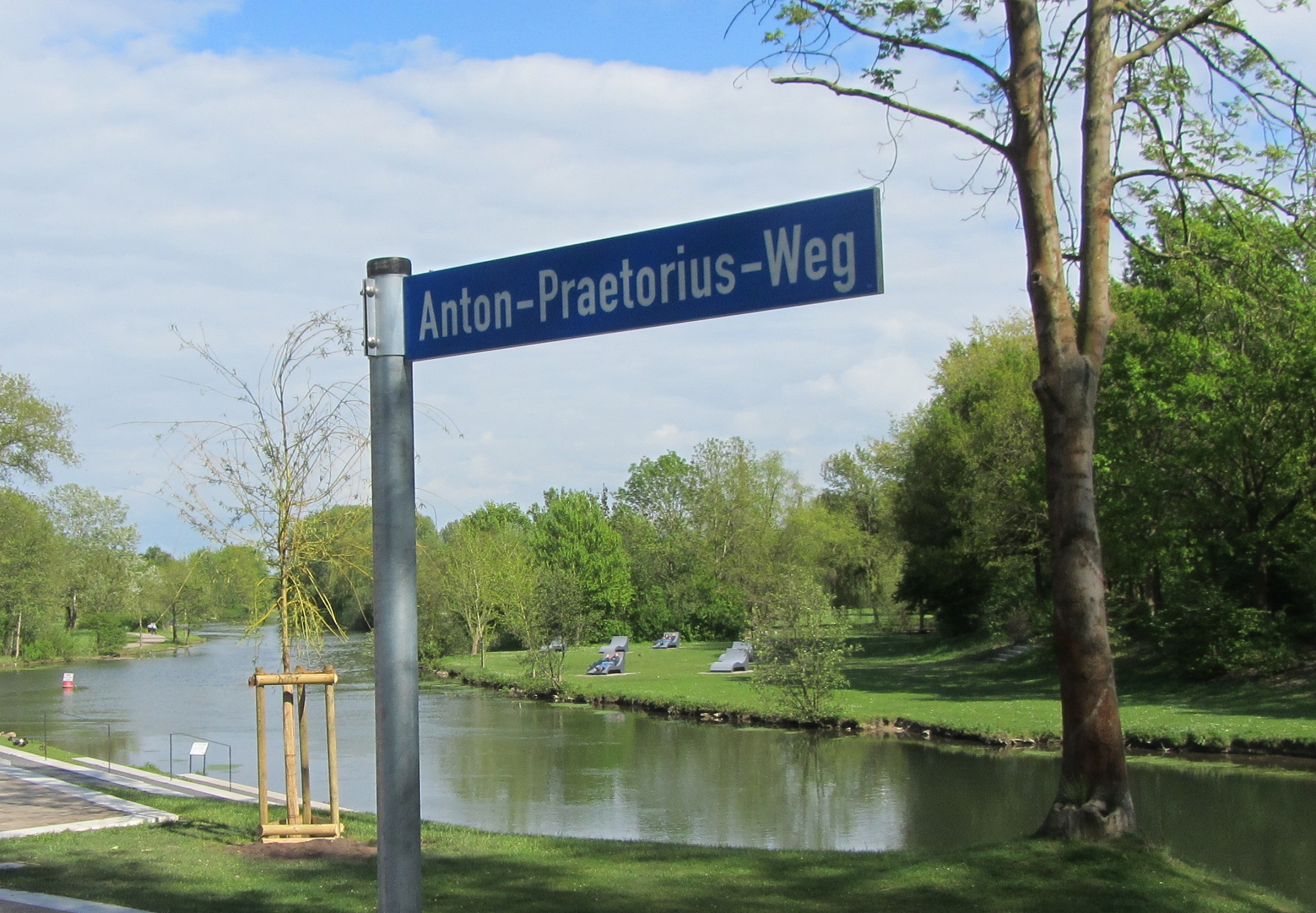
Inauguration of a street name for Anton Praetorius in Lippstadt/ Germany on May 7, 2015

The church of Laudenbach displays a plaque in memory of Praetorius and on May 7, 2015 the city of Lippstadt named a path in his honor.

== Bibliography (in German) ==
- Hartmut Hegeler: Anton Praetorius, Kämpfer gegen Hexenprozesse und Folter, (fighter against the persecution of witches and against torture) Unna, 2002 ISBN 3-9808969-4-3
- Hartmut Hegeler und Stefan Wiltschko: Anton Praetorius und das 1. Große Fass von Heidelberg, (the 1. Great Wine Barrel in the Castle of Heidelberg) Unna, 2003 ISBN 3-9808969-0-0
- Anton Praetorius, De Sacrosanctis Sacramentis novi foederis Jesu Christi, Eine reformatorische Sakramentenlehre von 1602 über die hochheiligen Sakramente des Neuen Bundes Jesu Christi (teachings about the sacraments) Lateinische Originalschrift (the original writing in Latin with a translation into German, translated by Burghard Schmanck), herausgegeben und übersetzt von Burghard Schmanck, Bautz Verlag, Nordhausen 2010, ISBN 978-3-88309-550-9
