= En natus est Emanuel =

Sacred motet by Paetorius

- Sacred motet by Michael Praetorius
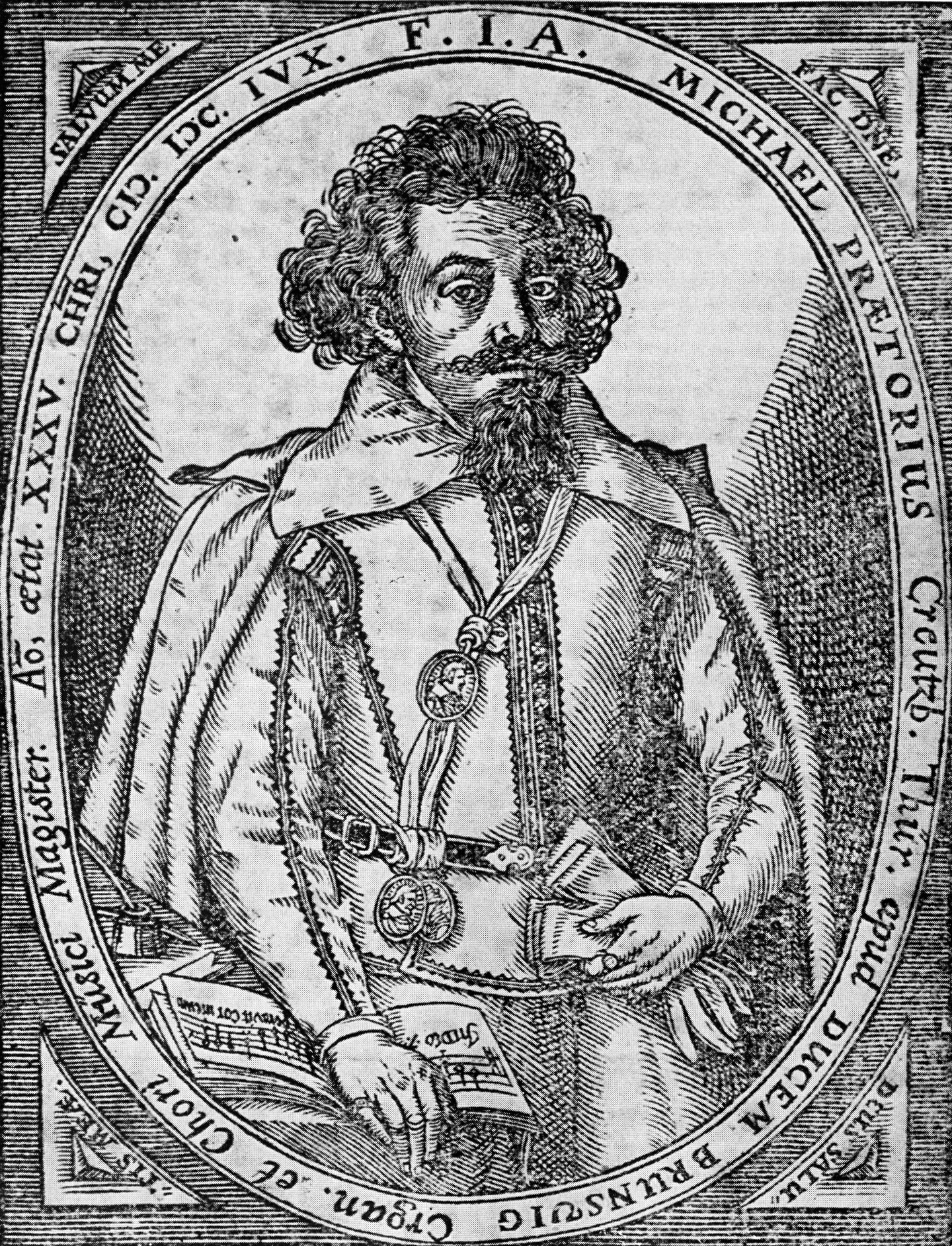
- Praetorius
- Language: Latin
- Published: 1609
- Scoring: SATB

En natus est Emanuel (Born is Emanuel) is a sacred motet for Christmas by Michael Praetorius who set Latin text to music for four voices. It is part of his 1609 collection Musae Zioniae. Some write the title Enatus est Emanuel.

The Latin is in three stanzas that are set differently but with the same refrain. The first stanza says that Emanuel was born the Lord (Dominus), as announced by Gabriel. The second stanza is about the baby in the manger, and the third stanza describes the light coming from the Virgin Mary. The refrain says that the Lord is our saviour.

The first stanza is begun by the two upper voices but the word Dominus is sung in long notes by all four voices. The second stanza is similar but begun by the two lower voices. In the third verse, all voice sing together throughout.

The motet has been recorded in programs for Christmas by choirs and vocal ensembles, such as a collection Es ist ein Ros entsprungen by the Vocal Concert Dresden in 2008.
