= Scultetus =

Scultetus or Sculteti is the Latinized form of German family names Schultheiß, Schulze, Schulte, etc.

Notable people of the surname include:

- Abraham Scultetus (1566–1625), German professor of theology
- Bartholomäus Scultetus (1540–1614), mayor of Görlitz
- Hans Robert Scultetus, German meteorologist and SS officer
- Johannes Scultetus (1595–1645), German surgeon

== See also ==
- Scultetus binder, a kind of bandage
- Praetorius
