= Schloss Hessen =

Coordinates: 52.018949°N 10.780597°E

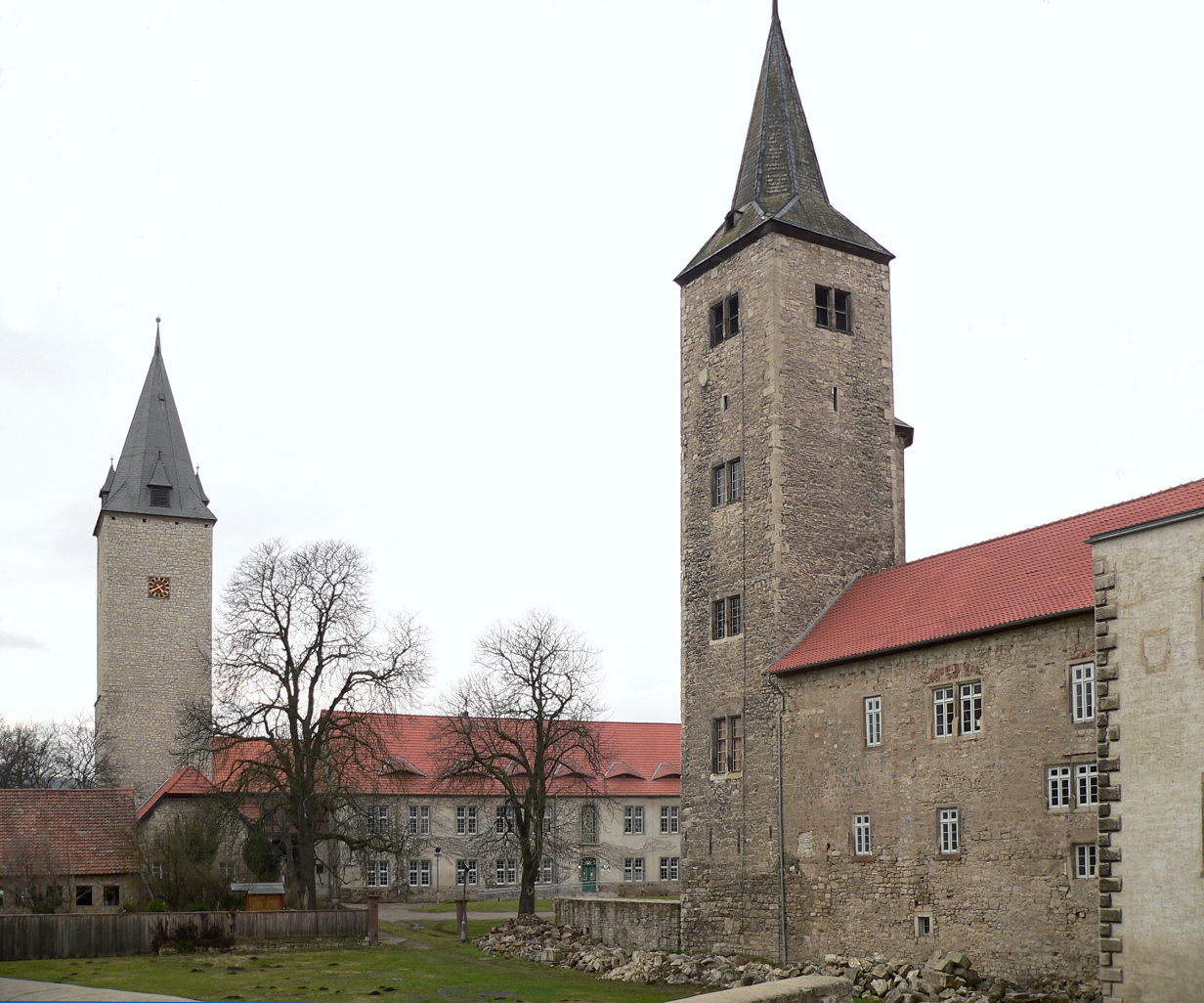
On the left is the lower castle with the Bergfried tower, on the right is the upper castle with the Hausmannsturm tower.

Schloss Hessen is a schloss or castle in Hessen, Saxony-Anhalt, Germany. It originated as medieval moated castle before being converted into a Renaissance princely palace in the 16th century. Its heyday was as the summer residence of the dukes of Brunswick-Lüneburg in the 17th century. It was later used as a farm house.

== Bibliography (in German) ==
- Paul Jonas Meier and Karl Steinacker: Die Bau- und Kunstdenkmäler des Kreises Wolfenbüttel. Wolfenbüttel, 1906.
- Johann Royer: Beschreibung des gantzen Fürstlichen Braunschweigischen Gartens zu Hessem. Halberstadt 1648. (Online)
- Thomas Scheliga: ARS TOPIARIA der Renaissance und des Manierismus in Europas Fürstengärten. Ein Beitrag zum Jubiläum „400 Jahre Lustgarten in Hessen am Fallstein“. In: Die Gartenkunst 23 (1/2011), S. 55–70.
- Thomas Scheliga: Schloss und Lustgarten Hessen am Fallstein. Dissertation, Heidelberg 2002. (Online)
- Friedrich Stolberg: Hessen. In: Befestigungsanlagen im und am Harz von der Frühgeschichte bis zur Neuzeit. Hildesheim 1968, S. 173-175.

== External links (in German) ==
- Website des Fördervereins Schloss Hessen
- Beschreibung bei Region Braunschweig Ostfalen
- Rekonstruktionszeichnung von Schloss und Lustgarten
- Beschreibung und Fotos bei braunschweig-touren.de
