= Jacob Praetorius =

German composer and organist (1586-1651)

Jacob Praetorius the Younger (also Schultz; 8 February 1586 – 21 or 22 October 1651) was a German Baroque composer and organist, and the son of Hieronymus Praetorius. His grandfather, the father of Hieronymus, Jacob Praetorius the Elder (died 1586), and his brother Johann were also composers.

As a student of Jan Pieterszoon Sweelinck, he was one of the most important organists and most respected pedagogues of the north German tradition before Johann Sebastian Bach. From 1603 on he was organist at the Petrikirche in Hamburg. His most important pupil, Matthias Weckmann, studied with him from 1633 to 1636 and later joined him in Hamburg as organist at the Jakobikirche. His compositional style includes both traditional and progressive elements. His three surviving preludes show the kind of sectionalism and diversity of styles that would become one of the defining characteristics of the genre. That is to say, they contain a free, rhapsodic (though restrained) opening section that foreshadows the stylus phantasticus style of German composers later in the century (notably Dieterich Buxtehude), followed by an imitative, fugal section that strictly adheres to traditional contrapuntal rules.

== Notes ==
His family is not related to notable contemporary Michael Praetorius. (See Praetorius for other members of the family.)

== Works, editions and recordings ==
- The motets of Jacob Praetorius II ed. Frederick Kent Gable - 1994
- Jacob Praetorius: Motets & Organ Works, CD Weser-Renaissance, dir. Manfred Cordes CPO
