= Johann Praetorius (composer) =

German composer and organist (1595–1660)

Johann Praetorius (also Johannes; 25 November 1595 – 25 July 1660) was a German Baroque composer and organist, and the son of Hieronymus Praetorius the Elder (1560‍–‍1629). His grandfather, the father of Hieronymus, Jacob Praetorius the Elder (c. 1520‍–‍1586), and his older brother Jacob Praetorius (1586‍–‍1651) were also composers. His twin brother Hieronymus Praetorius the Younger (1595‍–‍1651) was a theologian.

== Biography ==
Johann Praetorius was born on 25 November 1595 in Hamburg. He was a pupil of his father, Hieronymus. He was also a pupil of Jan Pieterszoon Sweelinck in Amsterdam between 1609 and about 1610, as his brother Jacob had been. From 1611, he was organist and church clerk at St.-Nikolai-Kirche in Hamburg, a position he held until his death. He was also an organist at Old St. Michael's Church and at the Cloister of St. Mary Magdalene.

In 1619, he married Anna Sperling, the daughter of Paul Sperling, headteacher of the Johanneum Gymnasium. They had two children: Hieronymus (b. 1620) and Elisabeth (b.1622).

Praetorius died on 25 July 1660 in Hamburg.

== Importance ==
According to William Porter, Professor of Organ at the New England Conservatory of Music, Praetorius was one of the key figures who established Hamburg's organ tradition and reputation during the early 17th century, alongside his brother Jacob at Petrikirche and Heinrich Scheidemann at Catharinenkirche. They were considered "musical preachers" (musicus politicus), where their improvisations and compositions were expected to reflect the rhetorical structure of a Lutheran sermon. Praetorius's lengthy tenure at St.-Nikolai-Kirche from 1611 to 1660 is noted for its stability and the development of the "Hamburg style" of chorale variation, which utilised the increasing technical capabilities of the city's expanding organs.

== Works ==
Surviving music explicitly attributed to Praetorius is very limited. He is known to have composed six wedding motets between 1615 and 1635, which are his only clearly identified printed music. The Berlin State Library holds handwritten transcriptions of three of these: Dulcis amica veni à 6 (n.d.), O pulcherrima inter mulieres à 6 (1635), and Felix cui divum à 8 (1619).

Musicologist Klaus Beckmann has reassigned 14 chorale settings and two psalm arrangements for organ to Johann Praetorius. These works, signed with the initials J. P., J. P. S., and Johann Peters, were previously attributed to Praetorius's teacher, Jan Pieterszoon Sweelinck. These reassigned organ pieces form the core of his known compositions. However, Beckmann's attributions are considered controversial in musicology.

A modern critical edition titled Complete Organ Works (Sämtliche Orgelwerke), in the Masters of the North German Organ School series has been published by Schott Music, edited by Klaus Beckmann, containing these chorale and psalm settings and some variants. The works include:

- Allein zu dir, Herr Jesu Christ
- Ich ruf zu dir, Herr Jesu Christ
- Da pacem domine
- Vater unser im Himmelreich
- Psalm 23 Mein Hüter und mein Hirt
- Psalm 116 Ich lieb den Herren
- Puer nobis nascitur

== Media ==
A CD of selected organ works, the first devoted to Johann Praetorius, was released in 2009. It includes most of the works listed above, plus:

- Christe, qui lux es et dies
- Jesus Christus, unser Heiland
- Mein junges Leben hat ein End
- Nun freut euch, lieben Christen g'mein
- Gott, du unser Vater bist
