= Johann Praetorius (musician) =

German educator, astronomer and musician (1634–1705)

Johann Praetorius (also Prätorius; 27 January 1634 – 21 February 1705) was a German educator, astronomer and musician.

== Biography ==
Praetorius was born in Quedlinburg, the son of Johann Praetorius, the headteacher of the school in his hometown, which Johann the younger attended. On 29 January 1653, he began his studies at the University of Wittenberg, where he attended lectures by August Buchner on rhetoric and poetry. During this time, he also began studying theology. After recovering from an illness in Karlsbad, he attended the University of Jena, where he studied mathematics under Erhard Weigel and continued his theological studies. In 1660, he received his Master of Philosophy degree and soon after became an assistant professor in the Faculty of Philosophy. Due to his success during his time at the University of Jena, he became a private tutor at the court of Duke Ernst of Gotha and also taught mathematics at the local gymnasium.

Two years later, he became headteacher of the town school in Soest, and in 1675, headteacher of the gymnasium in Halle (Saale). He remained in this position for thirty years, during which time he transformed the gymnasium into a flourishing Lutheran educational institution. Praetorius also made a name for himself as a composer, with his oratorio "David" being performed in Halle. None of his compositions have survived. He also published a treatise on comet observation. Many students attended his school, including George Frideric Handel, Adam Erdmann Mirus, and Johann Burchard Freystein.

In 1684, he married Anne Katharina, the daughter of Samuel Mylius, the cantor at the gymnasium in Merseburg. She died in 1690 during the birth of a stillborn daughter.

== Writings ==
- Carmina
- Programmata
- Argutas inscriptiones
- Panegyricos seromones
- Disputationes physicas, ethicas und politicas: Cum Appendice Depulsionis Criminationum, quae in Illam ibi hoc nomine sparguntur Programma Natalitium, Historiam exhibens Observationum Cometae Ao. 1680. mense Novembri Lipsiae primum conspecti. Halle 1680
- Physica Meletemata Disputationibus Viginti Et Quinque Comprehensa.

== Sources ==
- Zedler, Johann Heinrich (1741). Grosses vollständiges Universal-Lexicon Aller Wissenschafften und Künste [Great Complete Universal Lexicon of All Sciences and Arts] (in German). Vol. 29. Leipzig. p. 148.
- Dreyhaupt, Johann Christoph von (1749–1750). Pagus Neletizi et Nudzici, oder ausführliche diplomatisch-historische Beschreibung des zum ehemaligen Primat und Ertz-Stifft, nunmehr aber durch den westphälischen Friedens-Schluß secularisirten Herzogthum Magdeburg gehörigen Saal-Kreyses und aller darinnen befindlichen Städte, Schlösser, Aemter, Rittergüter, adelichen Familien, Kirchen, Clöster, Pfarren und Dörffer, insonderheit der Städte Halle, Neumarckt, Glaucha, Wettin, Löbegün, Cönnern und Alsleben; aus Actis publicis und glaubwürdigen … Nachrichten mit Fleiß zusammengetragen, mit vielen ungedruckten Dacumenten bestärcket, mit Kupferstichen und Abrissen gezieret, und mit den nöthigen Registern versehen [Pagus Neletizi et Nudzici, or a detailed diplomatic-historical description of the Saal district, belonging to the former primacy and archbishopric, but now secularized by the Peace of Westphalia, Duchy of Magdeburg, and all the towns, castles, offices, manors, noble families, churches, monasteries, parishes and villages therein, in particular the towns of Halle, Neumarkt, Glaucha, Wettin, Löbegün, Cönnern and Alsleben; diligently compiled from public records and credible … reports, reinforced with many unpublished documents, adorned with copperplate engravings and sketches, and provided with the necessary indexes.] (in German). Vol. 2. Halle: Emanuel Schneider. p. 690.
- Schilling, Gustav (1841). Encyclopädie der gesammten musikalischen Wissenschaften: oder Universal-Lexicon der Tonkunst [Encyclopedia of all musical sciences: or Universal Lexicon of Music] (in German). Vol. 5. Franz Heinrich Köhler Publishing House. p. 535.
- Kümmerle, Salomon. Encyklopädie der evangelischen Kirchenmusik [Encyclopedia of Protestant Church Music] (in German). Vol. 2. p. 728.
- Jöcher, Christian Gottlieb, ed. (1751). Allgemeines Gelehrten-Lexicon [General Scholars' Lexicon] (in German). Vol. 3: M–R. Leipzig: Johann Friedrich Gleditsch. col. 1749–1750.
