= Michael Praetorius =

German composer, organist, and music theorist (c. 1571–1621)

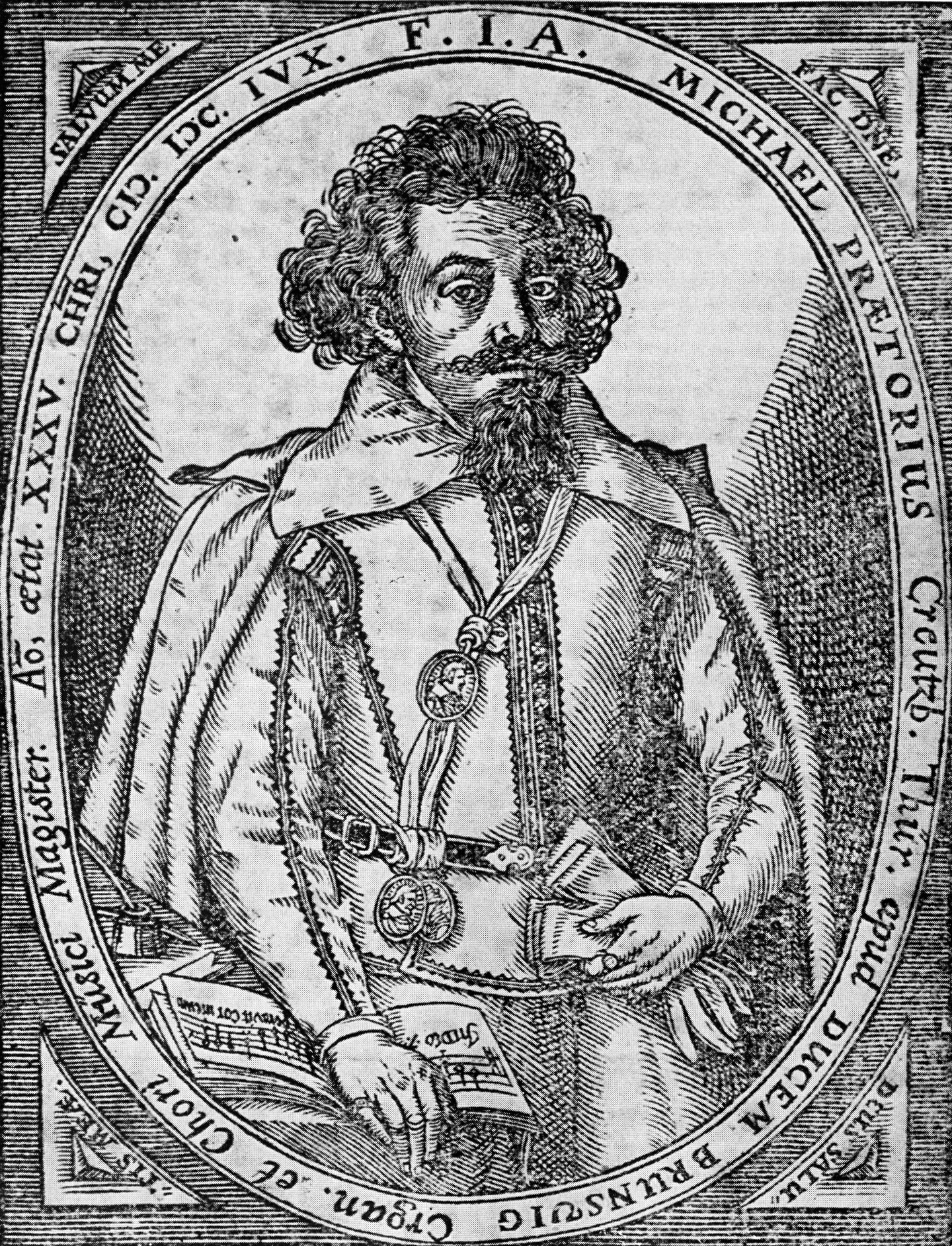
- Born: 28 September 1571 (most likely); Creuzburg
- Died: 15 February 1621 (aged 49); Wolfenbüttel
- Burial place: Marienkirche, Wolfenbüttel
- Occupations: Composer; organist; music theorist

Michael Praetorius (probably 28 September 1571 – 15 February 1621) was a German composer, organist, and music theorist. He was one of the most versatile composers of his age, being particularly significant in the development of musical forms based on Lutheran hymns.

== Life ==
Praetorius was born Michael Schultze, the youngest son of a Lutheran pastor, in Creuzburg, in present-day Thuringia. After attending school in Torgau and Zerbst, he studied divinity and philosophy at the University of Frankfurt (Oder). He was fluent in a number of languages. After receiving his musical education, from 1587 he served as organist at the Marienkirche in Frankfurt. From 1592/3 he served at the court in Wolfenbüttel, under the employ of Henry Julius, Duke of Brunswick-Lüneburg. He served in the duke's State Orchestra, first as organist and later (from 1604) as Kapellmeister (court music director).

His first compositions appeared around 1602/3. Their publication primarily reflects the care for music at the court of Gröningen. The motets of this collection were the first in Germany to make use of the new Italian performance practices; as a result, they established him as a proficient composer.

These "modern" pieces mark the end of his middle creative period. The nine parts of his Musae Sioniae (1605–10) and the 1611 published collections of liturgical music (masses, hymns, magnificats) follow the German Protestant chorale style. With these, at the behest of a circle of orthodox Lutherans, he followed the Duchess Elizabeth, who ruled the duchy in the duke's absence.

When the duke died in 1613 and was succeeded by Frederick Ulrich, Praetorius retained his post in Wolfenbüttel. But he also began working at the court of John George I, Elector of Saxony at Dresden as Kapellmeister von Haus aus (nonresident music director). There he was responsible for festive music and was exposed to the latest Italian music, including the polychoral works of the Venetian School. His subsequent development of the form of the chorale concerto, particularly the polychoral variety, resulted directly from his familiarity with the music of such Venetians as Giovanni Gabrieli. The solo-voice, polychoral, and instrumental compositions Praetorius prepared for these events mark the high period of his artistic creativity. Gottfried Staffel's detailed eyewitness account of Praetorius's music directing at the 1614 Princes’ Convention (Fürstentag) in Naumburg and Matthias Hoë von Hoënegg’s epigram describing the impression Praetorius's music made on Emperor Matthias and other princes during a visit to Dresden in the summer of 1617 provide some sense of Praetorius's fame at the time. In Dresden Praetorius also worked and consulted with Heinrich Schütz from 1615 to 1619.

It seems that Praetorius's appointment in Wolfenbüttel was no longer being renewed by Trinity Sunday of 1620. He was probably already lying sick in bed in Wolfenbüttel by that time. There he died on 15 February, 1621, at age forty-nine. His body was entombed in a vault beneath the organ of the Marienkirche on 23 February.

== Name ==
His family name in German appears in various forms including Schultze, Schulte, Schultheiss, Schulz and Schulteis. Praetorius was the conventional Latinized form of this family name, Schultze meaning "village judge or magistrate" in German. The Latin Praetorius means "magistrate-related or one with the rank of a magistrate."

== Works ==
From Terpsichore (1612):
"Entree – Courante"
A more commonly known Praetorius piece, for courante (French for "running"), a court dance for couples fashionable in aristocratic European ballrooms.

Praetorius was a prolific composer; his compositions show the influence of Italian composers and his younger contemporary Heinrich Schütz. His works include the 17 volumes of music published during his time as Kapellmeister to Duke Heinrich Julius of Wolfenbüttel, between 1605 and 1613. His nine-part Musae Sioniae (1605–10) was a collection of chorales and vernacular music for the Lutheran service for 2 to 16 voices; he also published an extensive collection of Latin music for the church service (Liturgodiae Sioniae). Terpsichore, a compendium of more than 300 instrumental dances is his most widely known and recorded work today; it is his sole surviving secular work from a projected multi-volume collection (Musae Aioniae).

Many of Praetorius' choral compositions were scored for several smaller choirs situated in several locations in the church, in the style of the Venetian polychoral music of Gabrieli.

Praetorius composed the familiar harmonization of "Es ist ein Ros entsprungen" ("Lo, How a Rose E'er Blooming") and the motet "En natus est Emanuel", both published in 1609 in Musae Sioniae VI. He composed several setting of "In dulci jubilo", published in various collections, including a version for double choir in Musae Sioniae II.

=== Published works ===
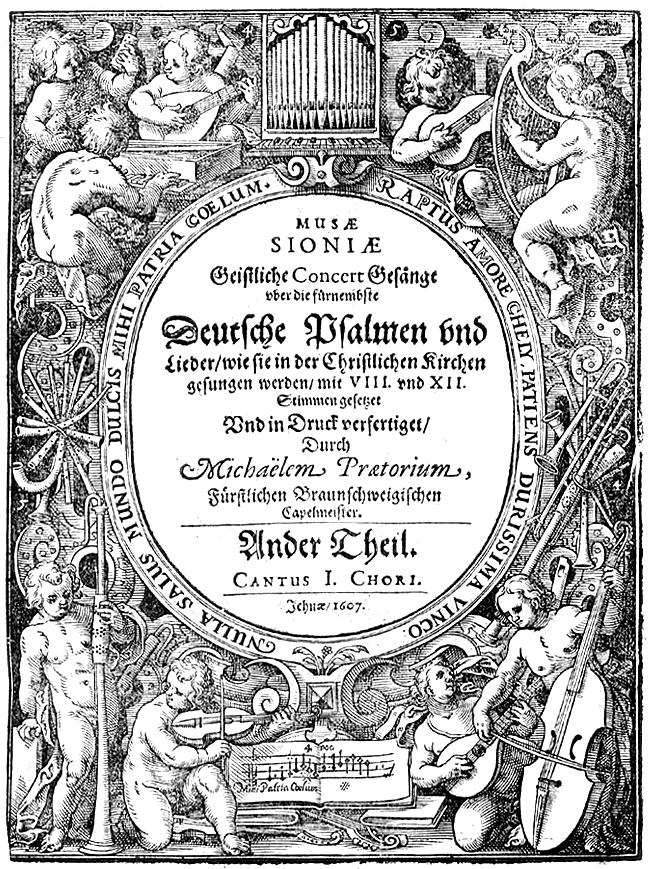
Title page of Musae Sioniae II

- Musae Sioniae I (Lutheran chorales, 8 voices, 1605)
- Motectae et Psalmi Latini (Latin motets and psalms, 8 voices, 1607)
- Musae Sioniae II (Lutheran chorales, 8 voices, 1607)
- Musae Sioniae III (Lutheran chorales, 8–12 voices, 1607)
- Musae Sioniae IV (Lutheran chorales, 8 voices, 1607)
- Musae Sioniae V (Lutheran chorales, 2–8 voices, 1607)
- Musae Sioniae VI (Lutheran chorales for church festivals, cantionale style hymnal, 4 voices, 1609)
- Musae Sioniae VII (Lutheran chorales for everyday use, including four organ chorales, cantionale style, 4 voices, 1609)
- Musae Sioniae VIII (Lutheran chorales for the Christian life including chorales suitable for death and Tischgesange for use at home, cantionale style, 4 voices, 1609)
- Musae Sioniae IX (Lutheran chorales for use in church or home, 2–4 voices, 1610)
- Missodia Sionia (Latin mass settings, 1611)
- Hymnodia Sionia (Latin hymn settings, 2–8 voices, several organ verses, 1611)
- Eulogodia Sionia (Latin settings, including the Salve Regina, Rex Christe etc., 2–8 voices, 1611)
- Megalynodia Sionia (Magnificat settings, Latin with some vernacular interpolation, 1611)
- Terpsichore (Courtly dances, 1612)
- Urania (chorales set for congregation and up to 4 choirs, 1613)
- Polyhymnia caduceatrix (Lutheran chorales for choir, soloists and instrumentalists in the new Italianate style; 1619)
- Polyhymnia exercitatrix (Latin Halelujah settings and Lutheran chorales for choir, soloists and instrumentalists in the Italianate style, 1620)
- Puericinium (settings for children, 1621)

=== Organ works ===
1. Christ, unser Herr, zum Jordan kam – Fantasia (Musæ Sioniæ VII, 1609)
2. Ein' feste Burg ist unser Gott – Fantasia (Musæ Sioniæ VII, 1609)
3. Wir glauben all an einen Gott – Fantasia (Musæ Sioniæ VII, 1609)
4. Nun lob, mein Seel, den Herren – 2 Variationen (Musæ Sioniæ VII, 1609)
5. Alvus tumescit virginis – Advent-Hymnus « Veni redemptor gentium » (Hymnodia Sionia, 1611)
6. A solis ortus cardine – Weihnachts-Hymnus (Hymnodia Sionia, 1611)
7. Summo Parenti gloria – (v8. A solis ortus cardine) (Hymnodia Sionia, 1611)
8. Vita sanctorum – Oster-Hymnus (Hymnodia Sionia, 1611)
9. O lux beata Trinitas – Dreifaltigkeits-Hymnus (Hymnodia Sionia, 1611)
10. Te mane laudum carmine – (v2. O lux beata Trinitas) (Hymnodia Sionia, 1611)

== Musical writings ==
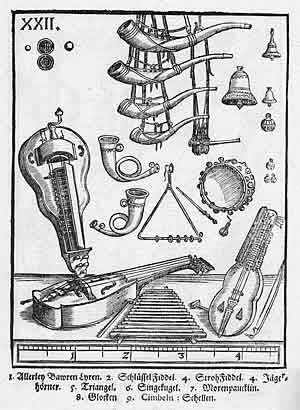
An illustration of several musical instruments from Syntagma Musicum

Praetorius was a music academic whose writings were well known to other 17th-century musicians. Although his original theoretical contributions were relatively few compared to other 17th-century German writers, like Johannes Lippius, Christoph Bernhard or Joachim Burmeister, he compiled an encyclopedic record of contemporary musical practices. While Praetorius made some refinements to figured-bass practice and tuning practice, his importance to scholars of the 17th century derives from his discussions of the normal use of instruments and voices in ensembles, the standard pitch of the time, and the state of modal, metrical, and fugal theory. His meticulous documentation of 17th-century practice was of inestimable value to the early-music revival of the 20th century.

His expansive but unfinished treatise, Syntagma Musicum, appeared in three volumes (with appendix) between 1614 and 1620. The first volume (1614), titled Musicae Artis Analecta, was written mostly in Latin, and regarded the music of the ancients and of the church. The second (De Organographia, 1618) regarded the musical instruments of the day, especially the organ; it was one of the first theoretical treatises written in the vernacular. The third (Termini Musicali, 1618), also in German, regarded the genres of composition and the technical essentials for professional musicians. An appendix to the second volume (Theatrum Instrumentorum seu Sciagraphia, 1620) consisted of 42 woodcuts depicting instruments of the early 17th century, all grouped in families and shown to scale. A fourth volume on composition was planned, with the help of Baryphonus, but was left incomplete at his death. Gustave Reese, an American musicologist specializing in medieval and Renaissance music, said that the Syntagma Musicum was one of the most important sources of seventeenth century musical history.

Praetorius wrote in a florid style, replete with long asides, polemics, and word-puzzles – all typical of 17th-century scholarly prose. As a lifelong committed Christian, he often regretted not taking holy orders but did write several theological tracts, which are now lost. As a devout Lutheran, he contributed greatly to the development of the vernacular liturgy, but also favored Italian compositional methods, performance practice and figured-bass notation.

== Sources ==
- Denis Arnold (editor), (1983), New Oxford Companion to Music, Oxford University Press. (Article by editor.)
- Quentin Faulkner (translator and editor), (2014) Syntagma Musicum II: De Organographia, Parts III – V with Index (Wolfenbüttel, 1619) Zea Books
- Jeffery T. Kite-Powell (translator and editor), (2004) Syntagma Musicum III: Termini musici (Wolfenbüttel, 1619) Oxford University Press.
- Stéphan Perreau (1996). Liner notes to Praetorius: Dances from Terpsichore. Naxos 8.553865.
