= Jacob Praetorius the Elder =

German organist and composer (c. 1520-1586)

Jacob Praetorius (I) or Jacob Praetorius the Elder (c. 1520 in Magdeburg – 1586 in Hamburg) was a German organist and composer. He was the father of Hieronymus Praetorius and the grandfather of Jacob Praetorius the Younger, both also composers.

== Life ==
Little is known about his life. He probably studied under Martin Agricola. From 1555 until his death he was the organist and church-composer at two churches in Hamburg. In 1554 he published a collection of choral works. In 1566 he published a collection of 200 works by Dutch and German composers under the title Opus musicum excellens et novum - only one of those works (a Te Deum in four parts) is by Praetorius himself, of which only the first part has survived. A Veni in hortum meum a 4 has also survived, either by Jacob Praetorius the Elder or his grandson Jacob Praetorius the Younger.
