= Willem Bentinck van Rhoon =

Dutch politician (1704–1774)

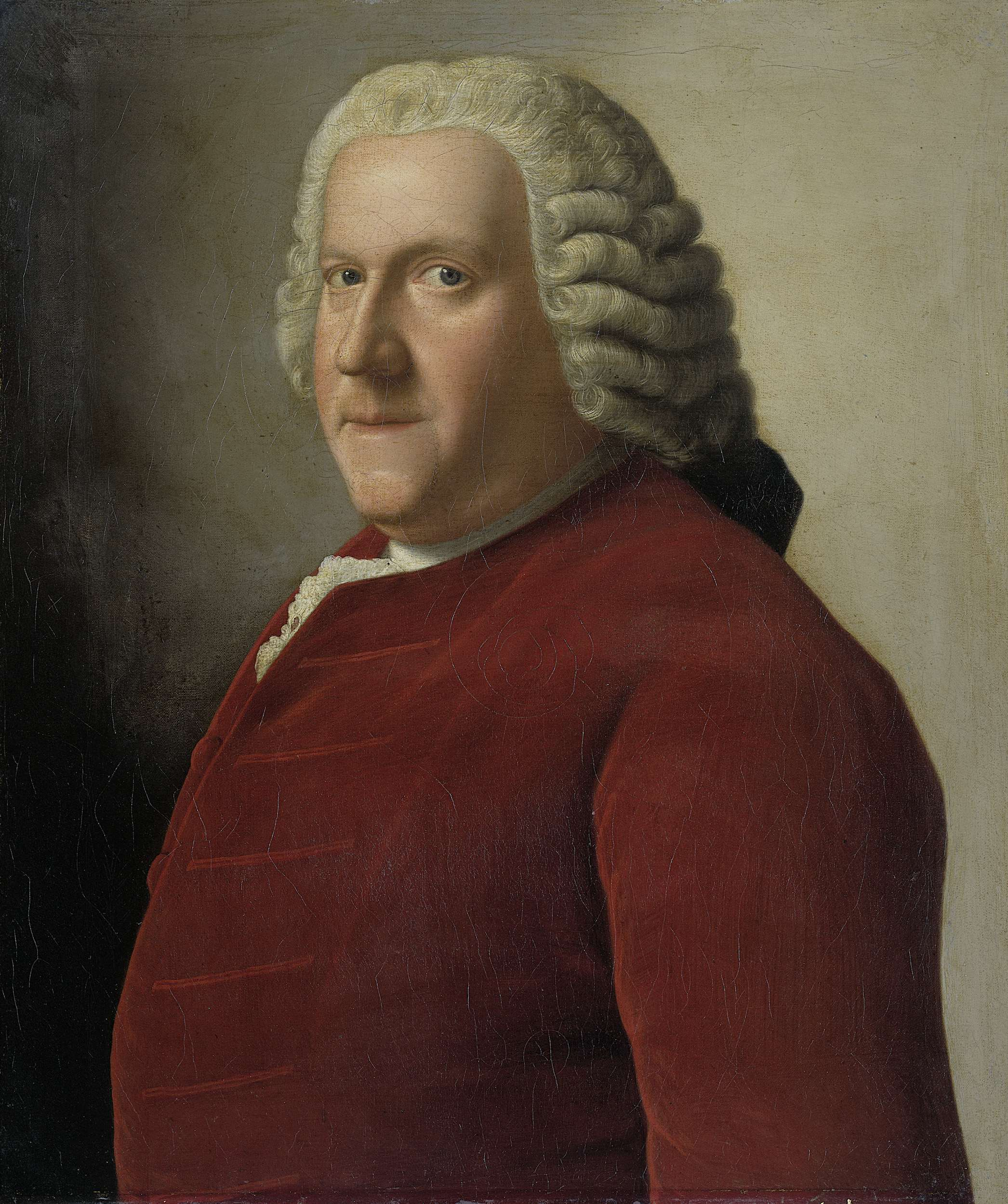
Portrait of Bentinck by Jean-Étienne Liotard, 1750

Willem, Count Bentinck, Lord of Rhoon and Pendrecht (6 November 1704 – 13 October 1774) was an Anglo-Dutch aristocrat and politician, the eldest son from the second marriage of William Bentinck, 1st Earl of Portland. He was created Count Bentinck (Graf Bentinck) of the Holy Roman Empire in 1732. Bentinck played a leading role in the Orangist revolution of 1747 in the Netherlands.

== Early life ==
Bentinck was the first son in the marriage of William Bentinck, 1st Earl of Portland, by his second wife, Jane Martha Temple (1672–1751), the youngest daughter of Sir John Temple. As there was an elder brother from the first marriage, Henry Bentinck, 1st Duke of Portland, he did not inherit the English possessions of his father under the rules of primogeniture, but he and his brother Charles did inherit some of their father's Dutch estates, Willem inheriting the lordships of Rhoon and Pendrecht which gave him a seat in the Ridderschap, the estate of nobles in the States of Holland and West Friesland, which would become his power base in the Dutch politics of the Second Stadtholderless Period as an Orangist partisan. In 1719 Willem and his younger brother Charles were sent to the Netherlands to complete their education under the guardianship of Johan Hendrik, Count of Wassenaar. He first enrolled at Leiden University and completed his studies in The Hague. From 1725 until 1728 he went on the usual Grand Tour through most of western Continental Europe. After his return to the Netherlands and his elevation to the States of Holland in 1727 he made an arranged marriage with Charlotte Sophie of Aldenburg in 1733. As the social status of the spouses was considered too unequal (Willem being the social inferior) Bentinck bought his elevation to the rank of Imperial Count of the Holy Roman Empire in 1732 from the German emperor. The marriage was not happy and the wife soon entered an adulterous relationship, leading to a factual separation in 1738 and a formal divorce in 1743, after which Charlotte attempted to regain the possessions she had brought into the marriage, which had been granted to Willem. This led to a series of lawsuits between the former spouses which brought eventual success to Willem, but meanwhile were a heavy burden on his finances.

== Orangist Revolution ==
As an Orangist Bentinck was in opposition to the regime during the Stadtholderless period. He championed the cause of William IV, Prince of Orange who was stadtholder of the province of Friesland in the Dutch Republic, but was denied that dignity in most of the other provinces. When the Dutch Republic became involved in the War of the Austrian Succession despite its attempts to remain neutral, and the French army successfully invaded the country at the end of 1747, the people rose against the regime of the Regenten, who were held responsible for the turn of affairs. There was a general demand for the appointment of the Prince to the stadtholdership in all provinces of the Dutch Republic and to make that office hereditary in the male and female line, not just by the Orangist faction, but also by democratic agitators like Daniel Raap and Jean Rousset de Missy. As a leader of the Orangist opposition in the States of Holland Bentinck adroitly manipulated the popular anger against the Regents, fanning the flames on the one hand, but often intervening to save Regents from mob violence, if necessary. He acted as agent of the Prince in the coup in September 1748, in which the city government of Amsterdam was overturned and put in dependably Orangist hands. His political successes made him a favorite of William IV, though he met much opposition from the prince's wife, the English Anne, Princess Royal and Princess of Orange, and her Frisian favorites at the court of the stadtholder (like Douwe Sirtema van Grovestins). The courtiers managed to thwart most of Bentinck's attempts at political reform.

== Diplomatic career ==
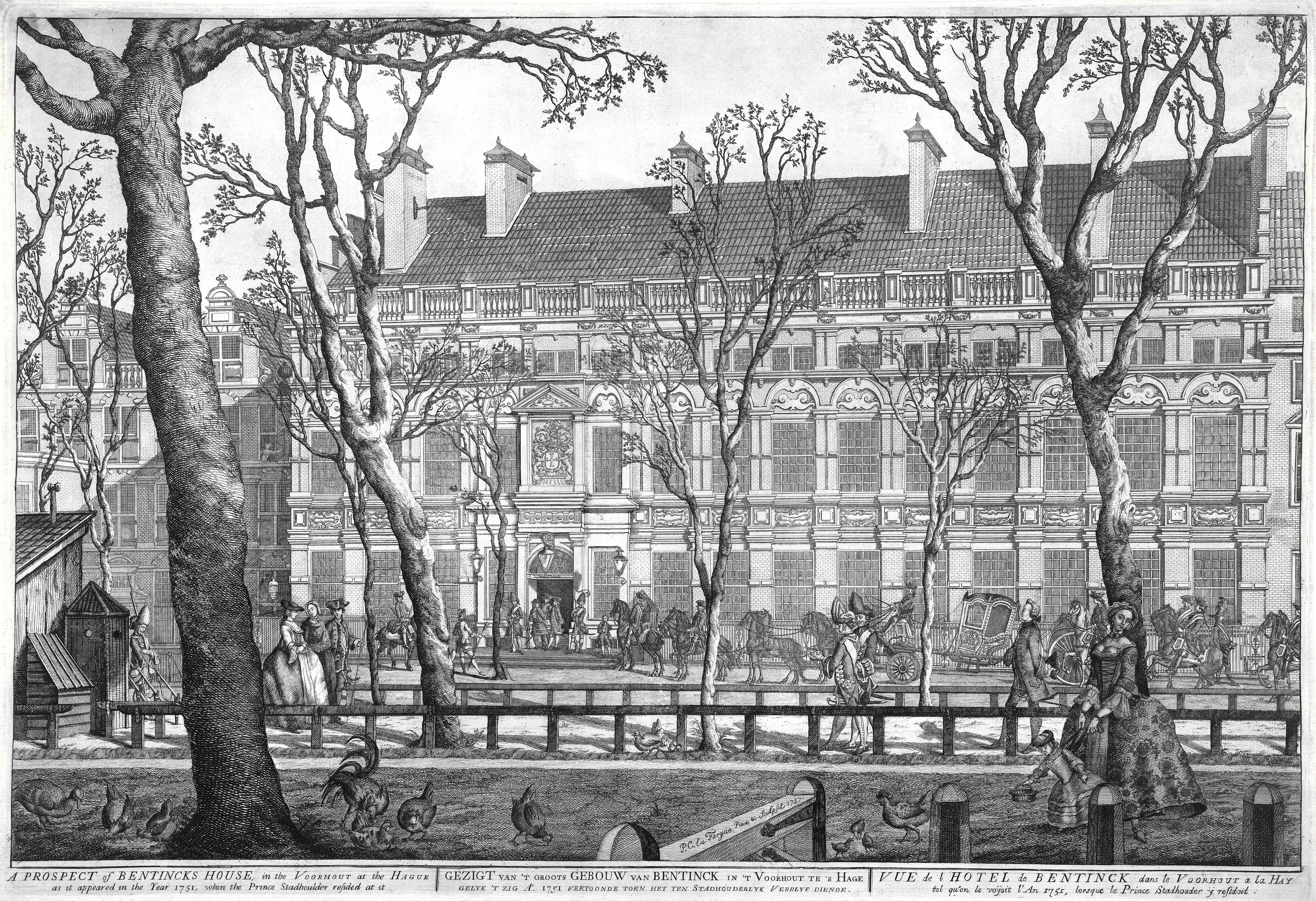
House of Willem Bentinck at Lange Voorhout Nr. 7 in The Hague. Print by Paulus Constantijn la Fargue in 1751.

Bentinck was more successful in his diplomatic career, which started with a mission in 1747 to coordinate military efforts against France with Great Britain. At the Congress of Aix-la-Chapelle (1748) where the eponymous peace Treaty of Aix-la-Chapelle (1748) was negotiated, Bentinck was one of the leading delegates of the Dutch Republic. He was unsuccessful in his attempt to renew the full recognition of the Barrier Treaty by Austria, though the Dutch Republic was allowed to resume possession of the Barrier Fortresses in the Austrian Netherlands. While on mission in Austria in 1750 he worked hard to get permission to engage Duke Louis Ernest of Brunswick-Lüneburg, an Austrian fieldmarshal, as commander in chief of the ailing Dutch States Army, which permission eventually was obtained.

== Later life ==
After the premature death of William IV, Bentinck was instrumental in putting the regency of the Princess Anne in place for her infant son William V, Prince of Orange, as hereditary stadtholder-general in the Dutch Republic. His relationship with the Princess and her favourites remained tense, however, and Bentinck never regained his political influence. When the duke of Brunswick gained more and more influence Bentinck actively opposed him. He openly denounced the Acte van Consulentschap which gave the duke the factual power to continue his "regency" over William V, after the latter had come of age in 1766. This put an end to any illusion Bentinck might have had of regaining his old political position at the court of the stadtholder.

== Family ==
Willem Bentinck was the father of the British naval officer and mechanical inventor John Bentinck.

== Sources ==
- (in Dutch) Bentinck, Willem in: P.C. Molhuysen and P.J. Blok (eds.) (1911),Nieuw Nederlandsch Biografisch Woordenboek (NNBW), Deel 1, pp. 302–303
- Israel, J.I. (1995), The Dutch Republic: Its Rise, Greatness and Fall, 1477–1806, Oxford University Press, ISBN 0-19-873072-1 hardback, ISBN 0-19-820734-4 paperback
- Wilhelmina C. van Huffel: Willem Bentinck van Rhoon, zijn persoonlijkheid en leven (1725–1747), Den Haag 1923 (in Dutch)
- Elizabeth (of Aubrey) LeBlond: Charlotte Sophie Countess Bentinck. Her life and times, 1715–1800. By her descendant Mrs. Aubrey Le Blond. 2 Volumes. London: Hutchinson 1912.
- Hella S. Haasse: De groten der aarde of Bentinck tegen Bentinck. Een geschiedverhaal. Amsterdam 1981 (in Dutch)

German nobility of the Holy Roman Empire
New creation	Count Bentinck; 1732–1774	Succeeded by William Gustavus Frederic Bentinck
