= Orangist revolution =

Revolution in the Dutch Republic

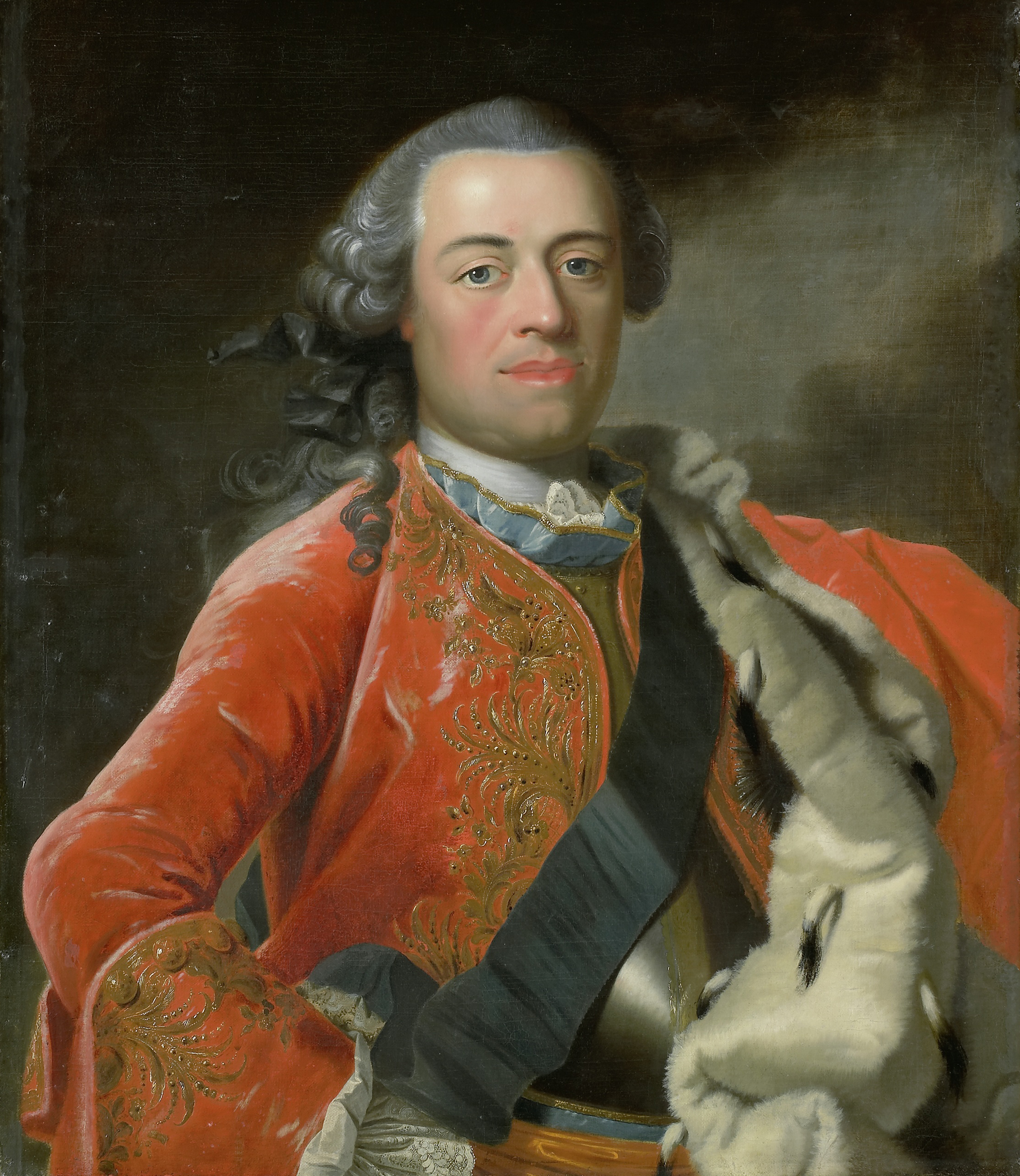
Portrait of William IV, Prince of Orange

The Orangist revolution of 1747 brought William IV, Prince of Orange to the Stadtholder office, finishing the Second Stadtholderless Period.

== Second Stadtholderless Period ==
After the death of William III in 1702, the republican Dutch States Party became powerful and the office of Stadtholder, which was customarily held by the House of Orange, was left vacant in the provinces of Holland, Zeeland, and Utrecht, though in other provinces that office was filled by members of the House of Orange-Nassau during various periods. During this time the Dutch Republic lost its status as a great power and its primacy in world trade. Though its economy declined considerably, causing deindustrialization and deurbanization in the maritime provinces, a rentier class kept accumulating a large capital fund that formed the basis for the leading position the Republic achieved in the international capital market.

== War of the Austrian Succession ==
The Grand Pensionary Simon van Slingelandt was succeeded after his death in office in 1736 by Anthonie van der Heim after a protracted power struggle. He had to promise in writing that he would oppose the resurrection of the stadtholderate. He was a compromise candidate, maintaining good relations with all factions, even the Orangists. He was a competent administrator, but of necessity a colourless personage, of whom it would have been unreasonable to expect strong leadership.

During his term in office the Republic slowly drifted into the War of the Austrian Succession, which had started as a Austro-Prussian conflict, but in which eventually all the neighbors of the Republic became involved: Prussia and France, and their allies on one side, and Austria and Great Britain (after 1744) and their allies on the other. At first the Republic strove mightily to remain neutral in this European conflict. However, the fact that it maintained garrisons in a number of fortresses in the Austrian Netherlands implied that it implicitly defended that country against France, though that was not the Republic's intent. At times the number of Dutch troops in the Austrian Netherlands was larger than the Austrian contingent. This enabled the Austrians to fight with increased strength elsewhere. The French had an understandable grievance and made threatening noises. This spurred the Republic to bring its army finally again up to European standards, 84,000 men in 1743.

== French invasion ==
In 1744 the French made their first move against the Dutch at the barrier fortress of Menen, which surrendered after a token resistance of a week. Encouraged by this success the French next invested Tournai, another Dutch barrier fortress. This prompted the Republic to join the Quadruple Alliance of 1745 and the relieving army under Prince William, Duke of Cumberland. This met a severe defeat at the hands of French Marshal Maurice de Saxe at the Battle of Fontenoy in May 1745. The Austrian Netherlands now lay open for the French, especially as the Jacobite rising of 1745 opened a second front in the British homeland, which necessitated the urgent recall of Cumberland with most of his troops, soon followed by an expeditionary force of 6,000 Dutch troops (which could be hardly spared), which the Dutch owed due to their guarantee of the Hanoverian regime in Great Britain. During 1746 the French occupied most big cities in the Austrian Netherlands. Then, in April 1747, apparently as an exercise in armed diplomacy, a relatively small French army occupied States Flanders.

This relatively innocuous invasion fully exposed the rottenness of the Dutch defenses, as if the French had driven a pen knife into a rotting windowsill. The consequences were spectacular. The Dutch population, still mindful of the French invasion in the Year of Disaster of 1672, went into a state of blind panic, though the actual situation was far from desperate as it had been in that year. As in 1672 the people started clamoring for a restoration of the stadtholderate. This did not necessarily improve matters militarily. William IV, who had been waiting in the wings impatiently since he got his vaunted title of Prince of Orange back in 1732, was no great military genius, as he proved at the Battle of Lauffeld, where he led the Dutch contingent shortly after his elevation in May 1747 to stadtholder in all provinces, and to captain-general of the Union. The war itself was brought to a not-too-devastating end for the Republic with the Treaty of Aix-la-Chapelle (1748), and the French retreated of their own accord from the Dutch frontier.

== Start of the unrest ==
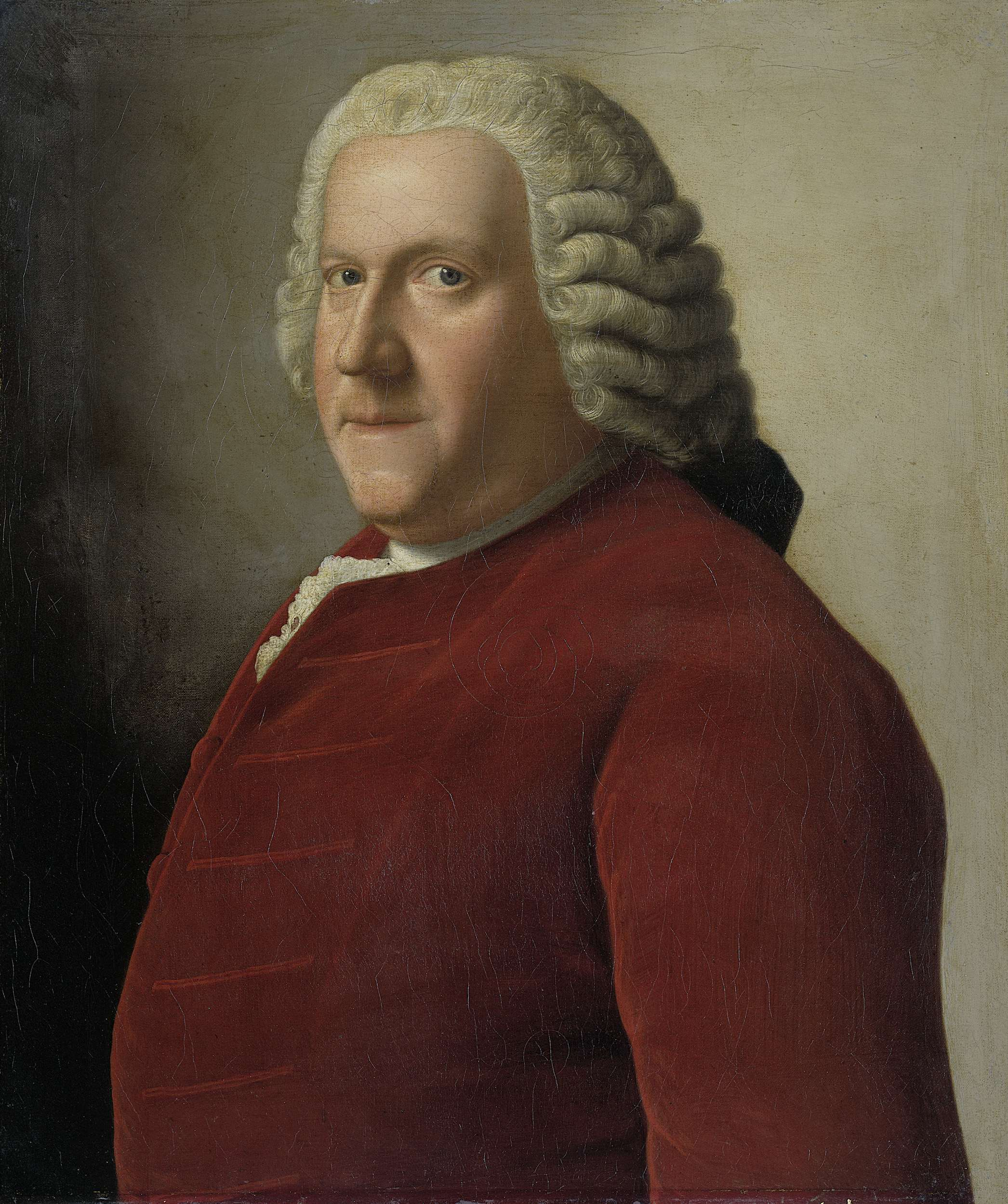
Bentinck van Rhoon, pastel by Liotard

The popular revolution of April 1747 started (understandably, in view of the nearness of the French invaders) in Zeeland, where the States post-haste restored William's position as First Noble in the States and the marquisates they had compulsorily bought in 1732. The restoration of the stadtholderate was proclaimed, under pressure of rioting at Middelburg and Zierikzee, on April 28.

== Revolution in Holland ==
Then the unrest spread to Holland. The city of Rotterdam was soon engulfed in orange banners and cockades and the vroedschap was forced to propose the restoration of the stadtholderate in Holland, too. Huge demonstrations of Orangist adherents followed in The Hague, Dordrecht and other cities in Holland. The Holland States begged the Prince's representatives, Willem Bentinck van Rhoon, a son of William III's faithful retainer William Bentinck, 1st Earl of Portland, and Willem van Haren, grietman of Het Bildt to calm the mob that was milling outside their windows. People started wearing orange. In Amsterdam "a number of republicans and Catholics, who refused to wear orange emblems, were thrown in the canals."

Holland proclaimed the restoration of the stadtholderate and the appointment of William IV to it on May 3. Utrecht and Overijssel followed by mid-May. All seven provinces (plus Drenthe) now recognized William IV as stadtholder, technically ending the second stadtholderless period. But the stadtholderless regime was still in place. The people started to express their fury at the representatives of this regime, and incidentally at Catholics, whose toleration apparently still enraged the Calvinist followers of the Orangist ideology, just as the revolution of 1672 had been accompanied by agitation against minority Protestant sects. Just like in 1672 this new popular revolt had democratic overtones also: people demanded popular involvement in civic government, reforms to curb corruption and financial abuses, a programme to revive commerce and industry, and (peculiarly in modern eyes) stricter curbs on swearing in public and desecrating the sabbath.

== William decides ==
At first William, satisfied with his political gains, did nothing to accede to these demands. Bentinck, who had a keen political mind, saw farther and advised the purge of the leaders of the States Party: Grand Pensionary Jacob Gilles (who had succeeded Van der Heim in 1746), secretary of the Council of State Adriaen van der Hoop, and sundry regents and the leaders of the ridderschappen in Holland and Overijssel. Except for Van der Hoop, for the moment nobody was removed, however. But the anti-Catholic riots continued, keeping unrest at a fever pitch. Soon this unrest was redirected in a more political direction by agitators like Daniel Raap. These started to support Bentinck's demands for the dismissal of the States Party regents. But still William did nothing. Bentinck started to fear that this inaction would disaffect the popular masses and undermine support for the stadtholderate.

Nevertheless, William, and his wife Princess Anne, were not unappreciative of the popular support for the Orangist cause. He reckoned that mob rule would cow the regents and make them suitably pliable to his demands. The advantages of this were demonstrated when in November 1747 the city of Amsterdam alone opposed making the stadtholderate hereditary in both the male and female lines of William IV (who had only a daughter at the time). Raap, and another agitator, Jean Rousset de Missy, now orchestrated more mob violence in Amsterdam in support of the proposal, which duly passed.

== Outside Holland ==
In May 1747 the States of Utrecht were compelled to readopt the Government Regulations of 1675, which had given William III such a tight grip on the province. Gelderland and Overijssel soon had to follow, egged on by mob violence. Even Groningen and Friesland, William's "own" provinces, who had traditionally allowed their stadtholder very limited powers, were put under pressure to give him greatly extended prerogatives. Mob violence broke out in Groningen in March 1748. William refused to send federal troops to restore order. Only then did the Groningen States make far-reaching concessions that gave William powers comparable to those in Utrecht, Overijssel and Gelderland. Equally, after mob violence in May 1748 in Friesland the States were forced to request a Government Regulation on the model of the Utrecht one, depriving them of their ancient privileges.

The unrest in Friesland was the first to exhibit a new phase in the revolution. There not only the regents were attacked but also the tax farmers. The Republic had long used tax farming, because of its convenience. The revenue of excises and other transaction taxes was uncertain, as it was dependent on the phase of the business cycle. The city governments, which were mainly responsible for tax gathering, therefore preferred to auction off the right to gather certain taxes to entrepreneurs for fixed periods. The entrepreneur paid a lump sum in advance and tried to recoup his outlay from the citizens who were liable for the tax, hoping to pocket the surplus of the actual tax revenue over the lump sum. Such a surplus was inherent in the system and did not represent an abuse in itself. However, abuses in actual tax administration were often unavoidable and caused widespread discontent. The tax riots in Friesland soon spread to Holland. Houses of tax farmers were ransacked in Haarlem, Leiden, The Hague, and especially Amsterdam. The riots became known as the Pachtersoproer. The civic militia refused to intervene, but used the riots as an occasion to present their own political demands: the right of the militia to elect their own officers; the right of the people to inspect tax registers; publication of civil rights so that people would know what they were; restoration of the rights of the guilds; enforcement of the laws respecting the sabbath; and preference for followers of Gisbertus Voetius as preachers in the public church. Soon thereafter the tax farms were abolished, though the other demands remained in abeyance.

== New radicalism ==
There now appeared to be two streams of protest going on. On the one hand Orangist agitators, orchestrated by Bentinck and the stadtholder's court, continued to demand political concessions from the regents by judicially withholding troops to restore order, until their demands were met. On the other hand, there were more ideologically inspired agitators, like Rousset de Missy and Elie Luzac, who, quoting John Locke's Two Treatises on Government, tried to introduce "dangerous ideas", like the ultimate sovereignty of the people as a justification for enlisting the support of the people. Such ideas, anathema to both the clique around the stadtholder and the old States Party regents, were en vogue with a broad popular movement under the middle strata of the population, that aimed to make the government answerable to the people. This movement, known as the Doelisten (because they often congregated in the target ranges of the civic militia, which in Dutch were called the doelen) presented demands to the Amsterdam vroedschap in the summer of 1748 that the burgomasters should henceforth be made popularly electable, as also the directors of the Amsterdam Chamber of the VOC.

This more radical wing more and more came into conflict with the moderates around Bentinck and the stadtholder himself. The States of Holland, now thoroughly alarmed by these "radical" developments, asked the stadtholder to go to Amsterdam in person to restore order by whatever means necessary. When the Prince visited the city on this mission in September 1748 he talked to representatives of both wings of the Doelisten. He was reluctant to accede to the demands of the radicals that the Amsterdam vroedschap should be purged, though he had to change his mind under pressure of huge demonstrations favoring the radicals. The purge fell, however, far short of what the radicals had hoped for. The new vroedschap still contained many members of the old regent families. The Prince refused to accede to further demands, leaving the Amsterdam populace distinctly disaffected. This was the first clear break between the new regime and a large part of its popular following.

== Aftermath ==
Similar developments ensued in other Holland cities: William's purges of the city governments in response to popular demand were halfhearted and fell short of expectations, causing further disaffection. William was ready to promote change, but only as far as it suited him. He continued to promote the introduction of government regulations, like those of the inland provinces, in Holland also. These were intended to give him a firm grip on government patronage, so as to entrench his loyal placements in all strategic government positions. Eventually he managed to achieve this aim in all provinces. People like Bentinck hoped that gathering the reins of power in the hands of a single "eminent head" would soon help restore the state of the Dutch economy and finances. Such high hopes for an "enlightened despot" were not unique to the Republic at the time. In Portugal people had the same hopes of Sebastião José de Carvalho e Melo, 1st Marquis of Pombal and king Joseph I of Portugal, as had people in Sweden of Gustav III of Sweden.

William IV did not have the opportunity to govern for a long time after the revolution, as he suddenly died, at the age of 40, on October 22, 1751.
