= Daniel Raap =

Dutch porcelain merchant (1747–1751)

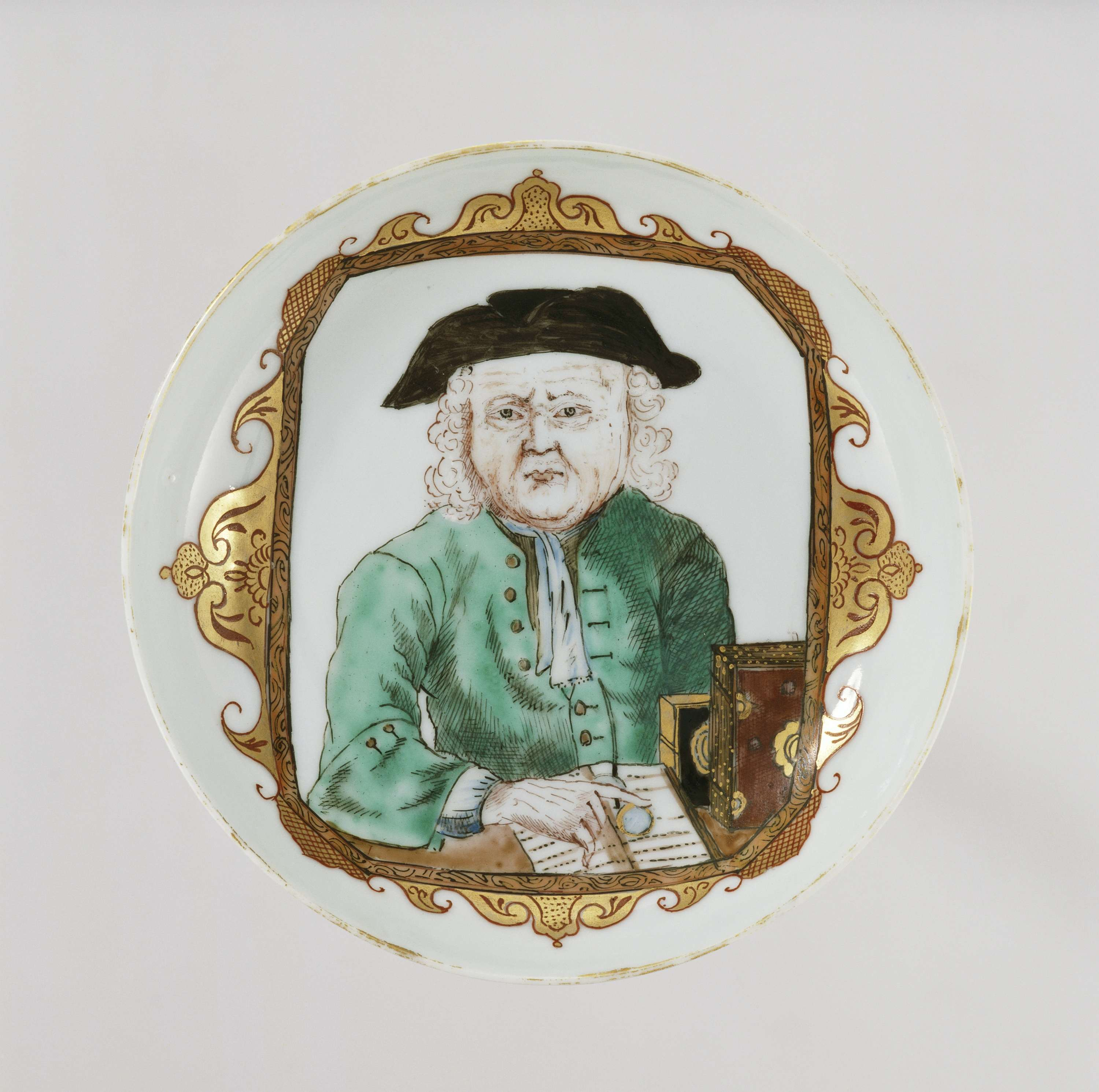
Daniel Raap

Daniël Raap (Amsterdam, 1703 – Amsterdam, 10 January 1754) was a porcelain merchant who played a leading role during the Orangist revolution in the Netherlands of 1747–1751.

During the opening months of the revolution that would put an end to the Second Stadtholderless Period, Raap, together with other agitators like the journalist Rousset de Missy published pamphlets demanding the restoration of the stadtholderate in the provinces of the Dutch Republic that had abolished the office, and the appointment of the Frisian stadtholder William IV, Prince of Orange, in all provinces to this dignity, that should henceforth be hereditary in the male and female line. At the same time the agitators asked for more influence of the common people on the government that had hitherto been dominated by the Regents. More specifically, the petition he circulated demanded that militia captains would henceforth be directly elected; vacant public offices be auctioned off; and the guilds be restored in their old privileges.

The agitators asked the Prince to come to Amsterdam to oust the city government, which he did on 2 September 1748. But instead of appointing new government members from the ranks of the democratic opposition the Prince selected the new city government from the old Regent class, be it from the Orangist faction that had been excluded during the Stadtholderless regime. This caused a rupture between Raap and the Orangist partisans, like Willem Bentinck van Rhoon. Likewise, the more radical democrats in the movement distanced themselves from him, because he was considered too moderate.

His erstwhile popularity therefore turned into a deep hatred by the members of the Amsterdam mob, who had earlier revered him, by the time of his death in 1754. There were riots at his funeral and his coffin was destroyed.

== Sources ==
- (in Dutch) A.J. van der Aa, Biographisch woordenboek der Nederlanden. Deel 16. J.J. van Brederode, Haarlem 1874, pp. 10–12
- (in Dutch) Het dagboek van Jacob Bicker Raye 1732–1772 (ed. F. Beijerinck & M.G. de Boer)
- Israel, Jonathan (1995), The Dutch Republic: Its Rise, Greatness, and Fall 1477–1806, Clarendon Press, Oxford, ISBN 0-19-873072-1
- (in Dutch) J.G. Kikkert, Honderd Vaderlandse Helden (Uitgeverij Aspekt, 2005)
