= Doelisten movement =

Orangist civic movement in Amsterdam

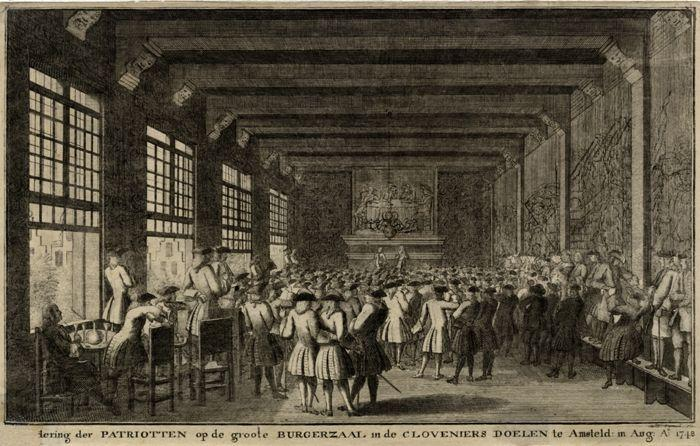
Vergadering der patriotten op de groote burgerzaal in de Cloveniers Doelen te Amsteld: in Aug: A° 1748.

The Doelisten were an orangist civic movement in Amsterdam, named after its primary meeting location the Kloveniersdoelen (or 'de Doelen' in short), which opposed the power of the Amsterdam mayors in the summer of 1748.

== The emergence of the movement ==
The cause which led to the formation of the civil movement was an eleven articles long petition which circulated among the civil militia just after the Pachtersoproer. This petition, which historian Pieter Geyl called a 'decisive democratic program', advocated radical reforms to the functioning of the city's governing bodies such as the election of the vroedschap and directors of the East and West India Company by the citizenry.

Through the correspondence between agent of the English King Richard Wolters and the Rotterdam cake baker Laurens van der Meer, Stadholder Willem IV learned of the activities of the Amsterdam 'democrats'. He then sent Van der Meer to Amsterdam to get a better idea what was going on within the reformist movement. In Amsterdam, Van der Meer was introduced to the leaders of the radical movement, including Jean Rousset de Missy, Hendrik van Gimnig and Andries Boekelman, through an office clerk Jacob de Huyser. They indicated to Van der Meer that they intended to turn the city government upside down, without needing the stadtholder to do so.

At a later time, contact was re-established between Van der Meer and De Huyser. De Huyser invited Van der Meer to come back to Amsterdam, where they started working on an alternative petition comprising three articles. This petition contained much more moderate proposals: they demanded the transfer of the revenues of the postal administration to the region, an end to nepotism in the allocation of city posts, the restoration of the rights and privileges of the guilds and the election of the senior officers of the Civil Militia.

== The gatherings at the Kloveniersdoelen ==
On August 9, the first public meeting took place at the Kloveniersdoelen. Both the radical eleven-article petition and the moderate three-article petition were to be presented this afternoon. Initially, the Doelisten occupied the Rondeel hall, but due to the great interest the radical Doelists had to move to the Grote Burgerzaal, where the literary society the Ridders van het Heelal was meeting at that time. Van Gimnig opened the meeting in the Grote Burgerzaal with a fiery speech full of references to a glorious past, the present of the decline of the Republic, the occupation by the French and the return of the stadtholder. This speech was intended to convince the public to support his eleven articles. Afterwards, he offered the petition for signature, which it is said that hundreds of people responded to. In the meantime, a smaller number of Doelisten of moderate origin had stayed behind in the Rondeel, where they discussed the three articles drafted by de Huyser and Van der Meer. When De Huyser decided to take their petition to the Grote Burgerzaal, he and his moderates reportedly did not stand out from the crowd.

It is only after Van der Meer managed to recruit the porcelain seller Daniël Raap for the moderate faction that they gained significant support. The charismatic Raap had already made important contributions to reformists in Amsterdam in November by, for example, devoting himself to making stadholdership hereditary and advocating to end the abuses regarding the distribution of government jobs. At the meeting at the Kloveniersdoelen of 10 August, he managed to convince a large part of the public with his speech of his criticism of the eleven-point petition and to convince them of the importance of the more moderate petition. In the days that followed Raap traveled up and down to The Hague for an interview with the stadtholder and his wife Princess Anna. He managed to get the support of the stadtholder and then 52 of the militia districts behind him for the three-article petition. On August 17, Raap, De Huyser and Ellie Chatin were summoned to the town hall where the mayors received the three articles of petition. The mayors asked the moderate leaders in exchange for considering the three-article petition to stop the meetings at the Kloveniersdoelen. Raap and his followers promised to do their utmost for this. However, Raap and his friends noted that they could not afford to suppress the radicals too hard at the risk of turning the mob against them.

On 21 August, the audience at the Kloveniersdoelen heard of the mayors' response to the three-article petition. The mayors had not, to their disappointment, made any commitment to implement any of the articles in the petition. This caused much anger at the meeting. More and more calls were made for violent protests and the overthrow of the city government. Raap and his followers had the greatest difficulty in subduing the crowd. Under pressure from the radicalizing voices at the Kloveniersdoelen, the mayors agreed to the three articles of appeal on 27 August. The next day, the vroedschap also agreed.

Meanwhile, the moderates managed to get a promise from the stadholder on 26 August to go to Amsterdam to restore order to the city. The radicals saw this as an excuse to choose representatives from the bourgeoisie who were to represent the interests of the burghers to the stadtholder. Although many moderates enthusiastically participated in the election, Raap and his moderate allies were vehemently against electing commissioners. Despite Raap's opposition, commissioners were elected in most of the 60 Amsterdam militia districts. These representatives regularly met at de Graaf van Holland inn.

On 29 August Willem Bentinck van Rhoon came to Amsterdam to prepare the stadholder's visit. He managed to get the concessions from Raap, Van Gimnig and the city government that the stadtholder could act as a mediator and that the decisions the stadtholder would take in this regard would be accepted by all parties. In addition, the Doelisten promised to keep the peace in Amsterdam during the stadholder's visit. In the days that followed, Van Gimnig and his commissioners, as well as Raap and his allies, both drafted a petition to present to the stadtholder.

On August 31, in response to an anti-goalist petition, a large solidarity demonstration was held in Amsterdam. At the request of the committee meeting, the 'Bijltjes' - the nickname for the shipwrights of Amsterdam - were mobilized to enter the city unarmed, together with civilians dressed as axes, to thwart the signing of the anti-Doelist pamphlet.

== The arrival of the Stadtholder ==
On September 2, Stadtholder William IV arrived in Amsterdam, staying at the Oudezijds Heerenlogement. In the days after his arrival, the stadtholder received deputations from the parties involved. Six people from the Doelisten were allowed to join from the committee meeting led by Van Gimnig and six people led by Raap. They uniformly pressured the stadtholder to dismiss and replace the mayors and the city council and to institute independent leadership to the civil militia, meaning a leadership without any members associated to ruling regenten class. Despite the fact that these were painful decisions, the Stadtholder relented. On September 5, the stadtholder informed the four mayors of Amsterdam Willem Sautijn, Jan Six, Gerrit Corver and H.H. van de Poll that they would be fired from their position. They were succeeded by Cornelis Trip, Ferdinand van Collen, Gerard Aarnout Hasselaar and Willem Gideon Deutz. On the advice of Mattheus Lestevenon, seventeen council members were replaced, nineteen were able to keep their seats. It became a provisional government until February 1. Among the newcomers were twelve merchants who were appointed to promote trade.

The matter with the civil militia was at this point still not settled. It was rumored that the prince wanted two colonels appointed by the government and three by the citizenry. The Doelisten were dissatisfied and wanted to defenestrate the negotiators. At night an incensed crowd stood in front of the Oudezijds Heerenlogement and demanded to speak to the Stadtholder. Eight were admitted. On September 10, the stadtholder promised that an independent civil militia leadership would be established. In the militia districts, fierce elections were held to appoint the new officers. However, there was a lot of unrest in the neighborhoods about the choice of captains. For example, it was often unclear how the captains should be elected and some captains had ties to the new government or lived outside the district. Despite the chaotic elections, the city government confirmed all newly elected officers of the Civil Militia on September 13.

On Sunday 15 September, the prince left - after the church service - for The Hague. Shortly after his departure, a proclamation from the prince announced that the newly established independent court-martial would be overturned and that the old leadership of the Civil Militia would be restored.

== The aftermath ==
Because the Stadtholder did not honor or even walked back on certain demands, there was a lot of dissatisfaction. The initial admiration for the stadtholder slowly turned into contempt. In the election for mayor in 1752, the Orangist candidates were defeated. At the same time, the old and new elite united in an anti-Orangist bloc. The mayors informed the princes Anne, who then became the regent for the Stadtholder, that they would no longer send her a nomination for the appointment of two mayors and aldermen. On March 6, 1752, a large number of Amsterdam regents signed the so-called Correspondence of Pointen van Ordre. In this new system, abuse of power on the part of mayors or the stadtholder was countered by seniority: of the members of the Correspondence, the elders would first be discussed.

== Selected Literature ==
- Anonymous. (1748) Korte schets of dag-verhaal van het tegenwoordig gedrag der burgeren van Amsterdam (in Dutch). Berlinkhof, Ferwerda and Van der Plaats.
- Bicker Raije, J., & Pieck, A. (1935). "Notitie van het merkwaardigste meyn bekent" 1732-1772 (in Dutch). (F. Beijerinck & M. G. de Boer, Eds.). Uitgevers-Maatschappij 'Joost van den Vondel'.
- Braatbard, A.C., & Fuks, L. (1960). De zeven provinciën in beroering: Hoofdstukken uit een jiddische kroniek over de jaren 1740-1752 van abraham chaim braatbard (in Dutch). Meulenhoff.
- Geyl, P. (1936). Revolutiedagen te Amsterdam: (augustus - september 1748): prins willem iv en de doelistenbeweging (in Dutch). Nijhoff.
- Israel, J. I. (1998). The Dutch Republic: Its rise, greatness, and fall, 1477-1806. Clarendon Press.
- Jagtenberg, F. J. A. (2018). Willem iv: Stadhouder in roerige tijden, 1711-1751 (in Dutch). Vantilt.
- Porta, A. (1975). Joan en Gerrit Corver: De politieke macht van amsterdam (1702-1748) (in Dutch). Van Gorcum.
- Voogd, N. J. J. de. (1914). De Doelistenbeweging te Amsterdam in 1748 (in Dutch). De Vroede.
