= Jean Rousset de Missy =

French Huguenot writer

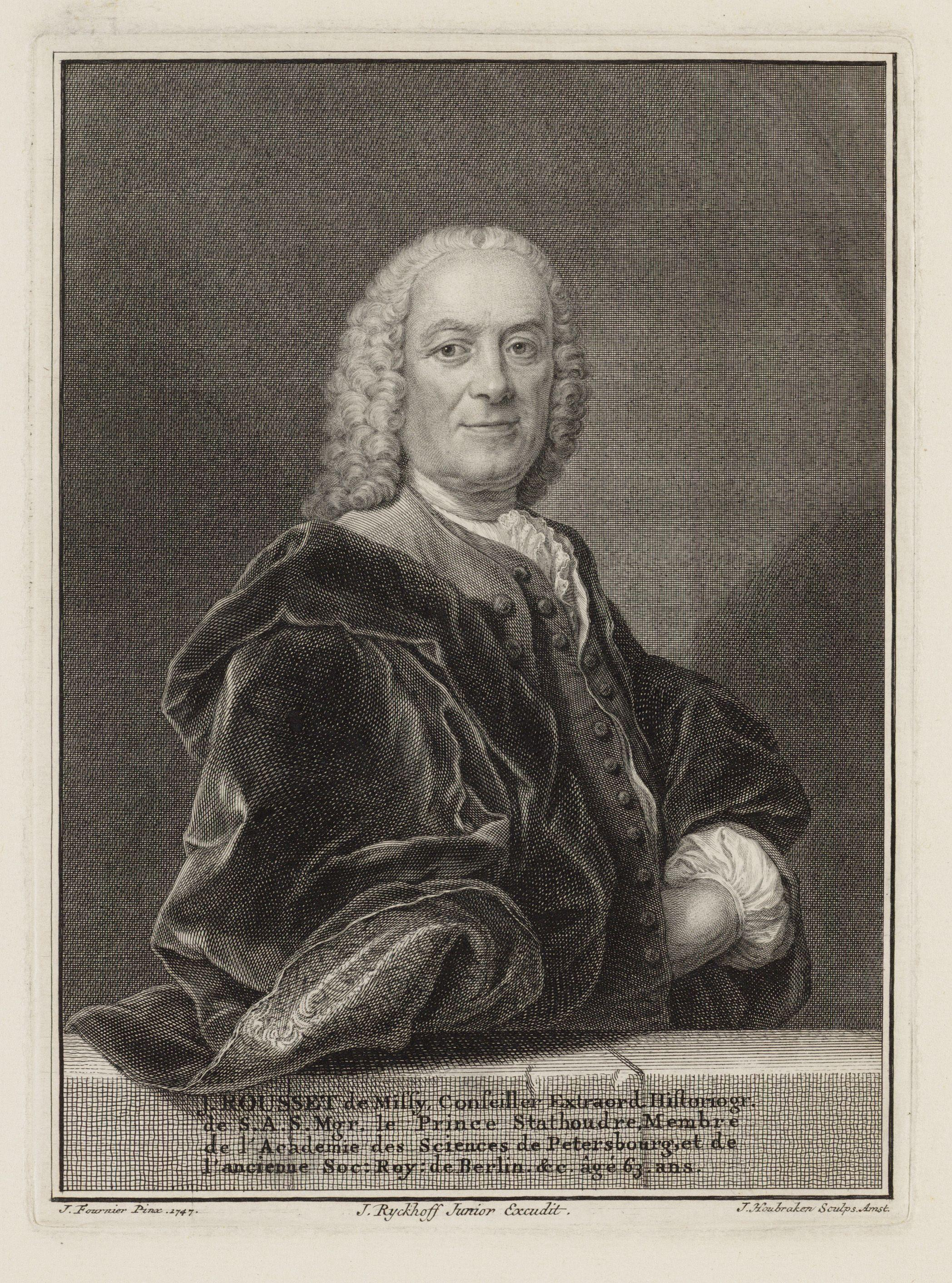
Portrait of Jean Rousset de Missy (Jacob Houbraken, 1747)

Jean Rousset de Missy (Laon, 26 August 1686 – Uithoorn?, 13 August 1762) was a French Huguenot writer, from early in life in the Netherlands. He was a renowned historian and author on international law and a prolific journalist. Born in Laon from Protestant parents (Jean Rousset and Rachel Cottin), he studied at the Collège du Plessis in Paris. After a conflict with his stepmother he joined the Dutch States Army during the War of the Spanish Succession and was present at the Battle of Malplaquet (1709). In 1724 (after having founded and led a school for aristocratic boys in The Hague), he started his activities as a professional journalist.

== Jurist ==
He worked together with Jean Dumont de Carelskroon (1667–1727), jurist of Charles VI, Holy Roman Emperor, and author of the Corps Universel Diplomatique du Droit des Gens, to which he published an addition in 1739.

Rousset's Recueil historique and Intérêts presens were the international reference works for contemporary diplomats. Rousset emphasized the importance of voluntary, or secondary international law: by contracting treaties, monarchs, republics and cities constantly amended, altered or created international law. As natural law (the "first" pillar) was concerned, Rousset referred to the 17th-century theorists Hugo Grotius and Samuel Pufendorf. For Rousset, his task in assembling formal acts was to give insight to the rulers and their advisers. As he stated in the foreword to his 1733 Intérêts presens:

"La Politique, c'est l'art de gouverner l'Etat, & d'en diriger toutes les Affaires, soit dans la Paix, soit dans la Guerre, relativement à ses Interêts avec les autres Puissances, & conformement au Droit & à la Justice."

Doing so, Rousset believed disputes between sovereigns could be settled by established procedures, following both older (Westphalia, Oliva, Golden Bul) and newer treaties (e.g. the 1713 Peace of Utrecht). War could thus be avoided by taking the road of informal and alternative dispute settlement mechanisms. In this, Rousset followed the established policy of French Prime Minister André-Hercule de Fleury (1653–1743) and British Prime Minister Robert Walpole (1676–1745), who already continued the views of the French Regent, Philippe II, Duke of Orléans, his minister Guillaume Dubois (both + 1723) and the British minister James Stanhope, 1st Earl Stanhope (+1721).

Next to the publication of treaties, Rousset also was an authority concerning ceremonial, a sensitive issue between sovereign courts. Rousset's texts were quoted or even copied extensively in French archival sources.

== Historian ==
Rousset and Dumont wrote a military account of the War of the Spanish Succession, illustrated by the Dutch engraver and painter Jan van Huchtenburg. Rousset also treated Russia under Czarina Catherine I, and Peter the Great and Spain under King Philip V.

== Journalist ==
Rousset, son of an exiled Huguenot and a former combatant at the Battle of Malplaquet (1709), is also known for his activities as a journalist (Mercure historique et politique), some of his correspondence has been published.

In 1748 he became involved in the Orangist revolution in the Netherlands. He was suspected of publishing anonymous pamphlets against the Stadtholderless regime and of leaking diplomatic information, which landed him in prison for a while. He was freed on the order of the newly appointed stadtholder William IV, Prince of Orange, who appointed him his personal historian and councillor. The stadtholder and he fell out, however, after Rousset joined the leadership of the democratic Doelisten faction in Amsterdam (together with Daniel Raap), and Rousset was fired as personal historian of the stadtholder. After he published a pamphlet that earned a complaint from the French ambassador he was forced to flee to Brussels. After having spent a few years there, apparently in the service of the government of the Austrian Netherlands, he returned to the Dutch Republic in 1752, where he retired to the village of Maarssen till his death on 13 August 1762 (which may have taken place in the village of Uithoorn). He was buried in the church of Thamen (near Uithoorn) 18 August 1762.
