= Second Stadtholderless Period =

Dutch historical period between 1702 and 1747

- 1702–1747
Stadtholderate of William III	Stadtholderate of William IV
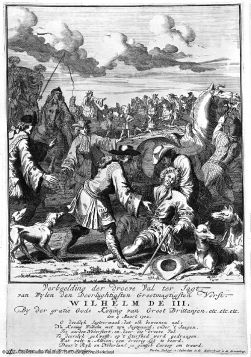
- William III's accident
- Location: Dutch Republic
- Key events: Orangist revolution

In Dutch historiography, the Second Stadtholderless Period (Dutch: Tweede Stadhouderloze Tijdperk) was the period between the death of stadtholder William III on 19 March 1702, and the appointment of William IV as stadtholder and captain general in all provinces of the Dutch Republic on 2 May 1747. During this period the office of stadtholder was left vacant in the provinces of Holland, Zeeland, and Utrecht, though in other provinces that office was filled by members of the House of Nassau-Dietz (later called Orange-Nassau) during various periods. During the period the Republic lost its status as a great power and its primacy in world trade. Though its economy declined considerably, causing deindustrialization and deurbanization in the maritime provinces, a rentier-class kept accumulating a large capital fund that formed the basis for the leading position the Republic achieved in the international capital market. A military crisis at the end of the period caused the fall of the States-Party regime and the restoration of the Stadtholderate in all provinces. However, though the new stadtholder acquired near-dictatorial powers, this did not improve the situation.

== Background ==
=== Historiographical note ===
The terms First Stadtholderless Period and Second Stadtholderless Period became established as terms of art in Dutch historiography during the 19th century, the heyday of nationalistic history writing, when Dutch historians wistfully looked back on the glory days of the Dutch Revolt and the Dutch Golden Age and were looking for scapegoats for "what went wrong" in later years. Partisans of the new royal house of Orange-Nassau, like Guillaume Groen van Prinsterer, who were indeed continuing the traditions of the Orangist party during the Republic, recast that history as a heroic narrative of the exploits of the stadtholders of the House of Orange (the Frisian stadtholders from the House of Nassau-Dietz, though the forebears of the House of Orange-Nassau, were less prominently featured). Anybody who had stood in the way of those stadtholders, like the representatives of the States Party, eminently fitted the role of villains in these romantic stories. Johan van Oldenbarnevelt, Hugo Grotius, and Johan de Witt, though not actually demonized, got decidedly shorter shrift than from later historians. The lesser-known regents of later years even fared worse. John Lothrop Motley, who introduced Americans to the history of the Dutch Republic in the 19th century, was strongly influenced by this point of view.

The general gist of the narrative was that as long as the stadtholders led the country, all was well, whereas when such heroic figures were replaced with the humdrum regents, the ship of state inexorably drifted to the cliffs of history. Superficially, the Orangist historians seemed to have a point, because both stadtholderless periods arguably ended in disaster. The negative connotation of the term therefore seemed well deserved. However, other historians put question marks next to the causal process that the Orangists postulated.

However this may be, some scholars have asked whether an emotionally and politically loaded term like this is still appropriate as a historical label in the task of historical periodization. Apart from the fact that long-persisting use in common parlance has established such a right to exist, that question may be answered in the affirmative, because as it turns out, the absence of a stadtholder was indeed a (positively perceived) principle of the constitution of the Republic in these historical periods. It was the cornerstone of De Witt's "True Freedom", the ideological underpinning of his States-Party regime during the first period, and would be revived as such during the second period. The renowned 19th-century Dutch historian Robert Fruin (who cannot be accused of overly Orangist sympathies) uses the (in his view arguably more appropriate) term "stadtholderless regime" for the periods, to emphasize the fact that we are not just concerned with a label, but that there was something in the historical situation that gives the historical circumscription "stadtholderless period" meaning.

=== The stadtholderate of William III ===
The popular revolt in reaction to the French invasion of 1672, during the Franco-Dutch War, had overturned the States-Party regime of Grand Pensionary Johan de Witt (ending the First Stadtholderless Period) and swept William III of Orange into power. He was appointed stadtholder in Holland and Zeeland in July 1672 and received powers that went far beyond those of his predecessors. His position was made impregnable when the States-General of the Netherlands authorized him in September 1672 to purge the city governments of major Holland cities from regents of the States Party, and replace them with adherents of the Orangist faction. His political position was further consolidated when the office of stadtholder was made hereditary for his putative descendants in the male line in Holland and Zeeland in 1674 (the office was made hereditary for the descendants of the House of Nassau-Dietz in Friesland and Groningen in 1675, apparently in an attempt to check dynastic encroachments from Holland on Frisian sovereignty).

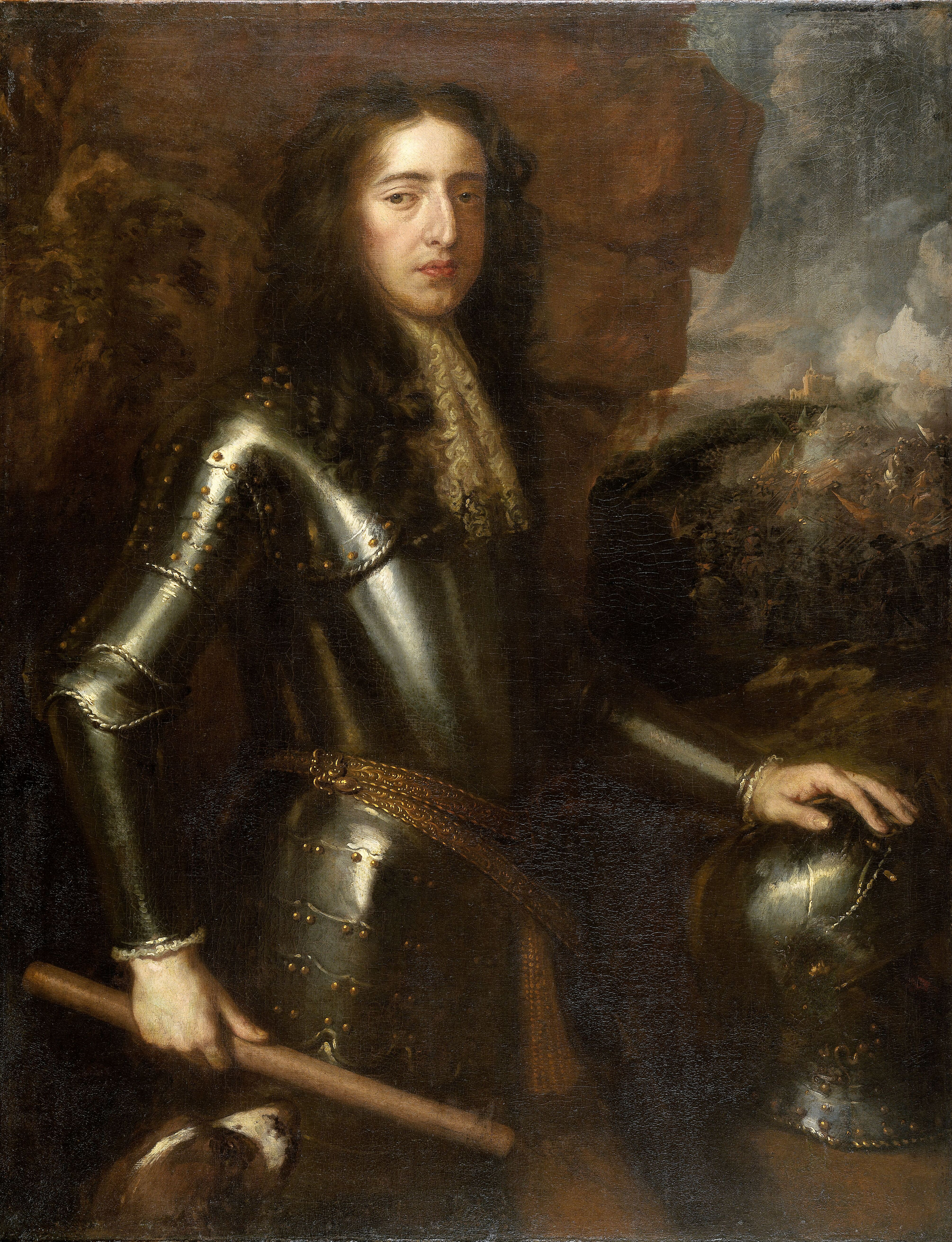
King-Stadtholder William III

At the readmission of the provinces that had been occupied by the French in 1672 to the Union after 1674 (they had been barred from the States General during their occupation), those provinces (Utrecht, Gelderland and Overijssel) had to pay a political price in the form of the so-called Regeringsreglementen (government regulations) that William imposed on them. These may be compared to organic laws that gave him the right to appoint most officials on the provincial level in these provinces and to control the election of city magistrates and magistrates (baljuws) in the countryside.

Many have erroneously interpreted these developments as the office of the stadtholder (at least in Holland and Zeeland) becoming monarchical. That would be a misunderstanding, however, even though the court of the stadtholder took on a decidedly princely aspect (as it had done under William's grandfather Frederick Henry, Prince of Orange). If William was a monarch at all, it was a constitutional one, with still sharply limited powers, formally and politically. The States-General remained sovereign in the Republic, the entity with which other states concluded treaties and made war or peace. The pretensions to sovereign supremacy of the provinces, however, as under the De Witt regime, were again replaced with the constitutional theory of Maurice, Prince of Orange, after his overturning of the regime of Johan van Oldenbarnevelt in 1618, in which the provinces were at least in certain respects subservient to the Generality.

The new, extended prerogatives of the stadtholder mostly regarded his powers of patronage and these enabled him to build a strong powerbase. But his power was in large manner checked by other centers of power, especially the States of Holland and the city of Amsterdam within that province. Especially that city was able to obstruct William's policies if they were perceived to conflict with its interest. But if they coincided William was able to forge a coalition that could override any opposition. This was demonstrated for instance in the summer months of 1688 when Amsterdam was persuaded to support the invasion of England, which later led to the Glorious Revolution and William and Mary's accession to the British thrones.

Nevertheless, these developments were a result of William's (and his friends, like Grand Pensionary Gaspar Fagel and William Bentinck) persuasive powers and skill in coalition building, not from his exercise of monarchical powers. Though commander-in-chief of the Republic, William could not simply order the invasion, but needed the authorization of the States-General and the States of Holland (who in practice held the strings of the public purse). On the other hand, the events of the 1690s helped to bring about a Grand Consensus in the Dutch Republic around the foreign policy, centered on opposing the designs of Louis XIV of France and maintaining (to that end) a close alliance with the former arch-enemy England, also when it became clear toward the end of William's life, that that country would after his death be governed by someone who would not necessarily put the interests of the Republic first (as William arguably did).

This grand consensus, however, was not the product of slavish sycophancy of courtiers, but of a genuine intellectual agreement in Dutch government circles that this was the right policy to follow, at least in the foreign policy field. It did not necessarily extend to the domestic policy field in all respects, and this may explain the course of events after William's sudden death in early 1702.

== Succession to William III ==
When he died, William was King of England (which included Wales), Scotland and Ireland. The Bill of Rights 1689 and the Act of Settlement 1701 firmly placed the succession in these kingdoms in the hands of his sister-in-law and cousin Anne. The succession to his other titles and offices was not that clear, however. As he was childless, William had to make provisions in his last will and testament to prevent any uncertainty. Indeed, he made John William Friso, Prince of Orange, head of the cadet branch of Nassau-Dietz of the family, his general heir, both privately and politically.

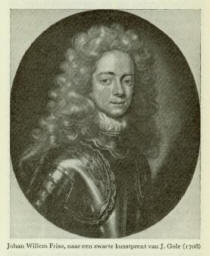
John William Friso

There was doubt as to whether he had the authority to dispose of the complex of titles and lands, connected with the title Prince of Orange, as he saw fit. As he undoubtedly knew, his grandfather Frederick Henry had made a fideicommis (fee tail) in his will that established cognatic succession in his own line as the general succession rule in the House of Orange. This provision gave the succession to the male offspring of his eldest daughter Luise Henriette of Nassau in case his own male line would become extinct. (At the time Frederick Henry died his only son William II, Prince of Orange did not yet have a legitimate heir, so the entailment made sense at the time, if he wanted to prevent the inheritance from falling into the hands of distant relatives.) Such an entailment was quite common in aristocratic circles, to ensure the integrity of the inheritance. The problem was that an entailment in general view limits the power of the possessors of the entailed inheritance to dispose of it as they see fit. William probably intended to override this provision, but the entailment made his will vulnerable to dispute.

And disputed it was, on the ground that it clashed with Frederick Henry's entailment, by the beneficiary of that entailment, Luise Henriette's son Frederick I of Prussia. But Frederick was not the only person who contested William's will. Frederick Henry's entailment happened to be the last in a long line of entailments by previous holders of the title Prince of Orange, beginning with René of Châlon, who had founded the dynasty by willing the title to his nephew William the Silent, the progenitor of most of the claimants. René had made an entailment that gave the succession to the female line of his nephew, in case the male line would become extinct. This overruled the agnatic succession apparently prevailing before this time for the title. It is unclear who would inherit according to this rule, but apparently there was no claimant, basing himself on it. (The two eldest daughters of William the Silent, one of whom was married to William Louis, Count of Nassau-Dillenburg, the brother of John William Friso's ancestor, died without issue.)

However, Philip William, Prince of Orange, William the Silent's eldest son, made an entailment that would override René's entailment, restoring the agnatic succession, and giving it to the male line of John VI, Count of Nassau-Dillenburg, William the Silent's brother. As it happened, the beneficiary of this provision was one William Hyacinth of Nassau-Siegen, who also vigorously contested the will in 1702. To complete the confusion, Maurice, Prince of Orange, Philip William's half-brother, made an entailment that would give the succession to the male line of Ernst Casimir of Nassau-Dietz, a younger son of John VI, and the progenitor of John William Friso. This was (next to William's will) the main claim to the inheritance of John William Friso. (Frederick Henry's entailment overturned this entailment of his half-brother, if such a thing would have been possible; apparently he did not fancy the succession by Willem Frederik of Nassau-Dietz, who would otherwise have benefited.)

All these claims and counter-claims set the stage for vigorous litigation, especially between Frederick of Prussia and Henriëtte Amalia van Anhalt-Dessau, the mother of John Wiliam Friso, as the latter was still a minor in 1702. This litigation was to go on for thirty years between the offspring of the two main claimants, until the matter was finally settled out of court with the Treaty of Partition between William IV, Prince of Orange, John William Friso's son, and Frederick William I of Prussia, Frederick's son, in 1732. The latter had in the meantime ceded the principality of Orange to Louis XIV of France by one of the treaties, comprising the Peace of Utrecht (in exchange for Prussian territorial gains in Upper Guelders), thereby making the matter of succession to the title rather immaterial (the two claimants decided to henceforth both use the title). The remaining inheritance was shared between the two rivals.

The import of this story is, that young John William Friso's claim to the title of Prince of Orange was contested during the crucial years immediately following William III's death, thereby depriving him of an important source of prestige and power. He already was stadtholder of Friesland and Groningen, as this office had been made hereditary in 1675 and he had succeeded his father Henry Casimir II, Prince of Nassau-Dietz in 1696, be it under the regency of his mother, as he was only nine at the time. He now hoped to inherit the office in Holland and Zeeland also, especially as William III had groomed him for the office, and had made him his political heir, and the office was hereditary. However, that provision had been contingent on a natural male heir for William III. The Holland regents did not feel bound by a testamentary provision.

Nine days after William's death the Grand Pensionary of Holland, Anthonie Heinsius, appeared before the States General and declared that the States of Holland had decided not to fill the vacancy of stadtholder in their province. The old patents from December 1650, conveying the prerogatives of the stadtholder in matters of election of magistrates to the city governments were once more put in force. Zeeland, Utrecht, Gelderland, Overijssel, and even Drenthe (which usually followed Groningen in the matter of stadtholders, but had appointed William III in 1696) followed suit. The Regeringsreglementen of 1675 were retracted and the situation pre-1672 restored.

The immediate effect was that regents from the old States-Party faction were restored to their old positions (i.e. in most cases members of their families, as the old regents had died) at the expense of Orangist regents who had been appointed by William. This purge occurred generally peacefully in Holland, but in Zeeland, and especially Gelderland, there was sometimes long-drawnout civil unrest, which sometimes had to be suppressed by calling out the militia, or even federal troops. In Gelderland there was even a genuine democratic impulse behind this unrest as the would-be newcomers (the nieuwe plooi or "new crew") availed themselves of the support of the common people who demanded a check by the pre-Habsburg councils of gemeenslieden, and generally of the representatives of militias and guilds, on the regent city governments, a development deplored by States-Party and Orangist regents alike.

Any inclination Holland and the other four provinces might have had to appoint Friso as stadtholder probably was negated by the fraught international situation. A new conflict with the France of Louis XIV was about to break out (William III indeed had spent the last days of his life finalizing the preparations) and this was no time to experiment with a fifteen-year-old boy in such important offices as that of stadtholder and captain-general of the Dutch States Army. Besides, the States-General did not want to offend an important ally like Frederick I of Prussia, who had already in March 1702, occupied the counties of Lingen and Moers (which belonged to William's patrimony) and was not too subtly threatening to defect to the French side in the coming war if he were thwarted in his quest for what he viewed as his rightful inheritance.

== Heinsius and the War of the Spanish Succession ==
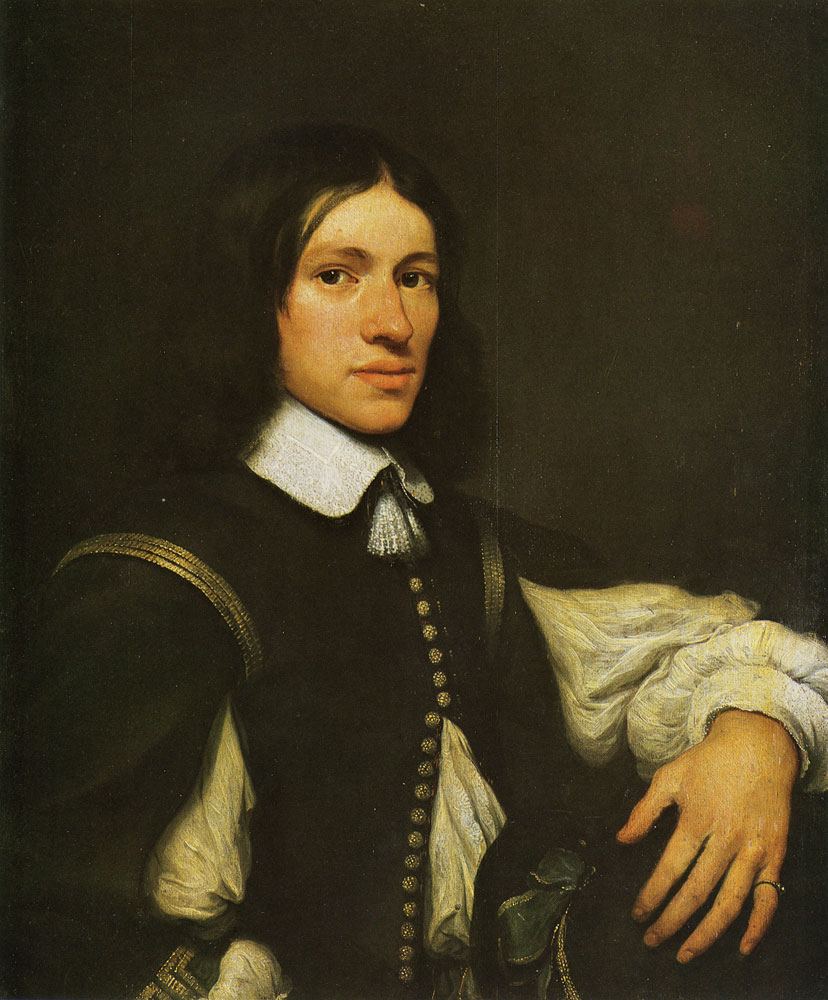
1659 portrait of Heinsius by Gerbrand van den Eeckhout

Anthonie Heinsius had been Grand Pensionary since 1689, almost as long as William III had been king of England. As William was busy with affairs in England, the task of managing the Dutch political scene was left to Heinsius. Those diplomatic gifts were also needed in keeping the grand coalition together that William had been able to form against Louis XIV during the Nine Years' War. It needed to be resurrected after the last will and testament of king Charles II of Spain, leaving the Spanish Crown to Louis' grandson Philip after Carlos' childless death in 1700, threatened to upend the European balance of power (so laboriously brought about with the Treaty of Ryswick in 1697) and diplomatic efforts to save that balance had failed.

William spent his last year of life feverishly rebuilding the coalition with Austria, his nephew Frederick I of Prussia, and a host of smaller German princes to support the claim to the Spanish throne of Charles III, as a means of preventing a union of the power of Spain and France, which might overwhelm the rest of Europe. He was ably assisted in this effort by Heinsius (as the Republic was the keystone of the Coalition and would be called upon to provide not only a large contingent of the allied troops, but also considerable subsidies to the other allies to pay for their contingents) and his English favorite, the Duke of Marlborough. These preparatory negotiations had all but been completed when William died on 19 March 1702 from complications after a fall off his horse.

William's unexpected death threw the preparations into disarray. Would the quiet revolution, overturning the stadtholderate and reintroducing the States-Party regime in the Republic, cause a rupture with England and the other allies? It seems there was never any danger of this, if only because the Republic (still a Great Power at this time, after all) was not about to break with the policies of the dead stadtholder in the foreign field, whatever they may have thought of his domestic policies.

Moreover, the Dutch regents had their own reasons to join the Coalition. In 1701 French troops had entered the Southern Netherlands with the consent of the Spanish authorities, and had forced the Dutch to evacuate their barrier fortresses, that they had acquired as recently as the Peace of Ryswick just to prevent such a French incursion. This eliminated the buffer zone the Dutch preferred between themselves and the French. More importantly, the French opened the Scheldt to trade with Antwerp in contravention of the peace treaty with Spain of 1648 (which Spain had always scrupulously observed). Also, Dutch trade with Spain and the Spanish Colonies seemed to be in danger of being diverted to French merchants in view of France's mercantilist policies. In 1701 the new Bourbon king Philip V transferred the Asiento for instance to a French company, whereas before the Dutch West India Company had in practice held this trade concession. In short, the Dutch had many economic reasons, beside the obvious strategic ones, to oppose Louis' taking over Spain and its possessions.

However, William's death did pose the problem that his position as undisputed military leader in the field (as during the Nine Years' War) was now vacant. At first it was proposed that Queen Anne's prince-consort Prince George of Denmark would become "generalissimo" of the combined Dutch and English armies, but (though they feigned enthusiasm) the Dutch preferred a competent general and managed to push Marlborough forward without hurting Anne and George's feelings too much. Appointing Marlborough lieutenant-captain-general of the Dutch army (leaving the top job formally vacant) was preferred by the States-Party regents, who trusted a foreign general (presumably without political ambitions) in this position more than a domestic general. During the first stadtholderless period in the 1650s they had played with the idea of appointing the French Marshal Turenne, though nothing came of it. In other words, Marlborough's appointment solved a political problem for them too. Besides, in a secret arrangement, Marlborough was put under the control of Dutch field deputies (a kind of political commissars) with veto powers over his decisions. This would prove to be a source of constant friction in the campaigns to come, as these politicians tended to emphasize the risks to the Dutch troops of Marlborough's decisions over their evident strategic brilliance.

This Dutch interest (and Marlborough's acquiescence to the field deputies' existence) can be explained by the preponderant role of Dutch troop contingents in the allied order of battle. The Dutch supplied about twice as many troops as the English in the Flanders theatre of war (more than 100,000 against 40,000 in 1708), and also played an important part in the Iberian theatre. For instance, Gibraltar was conquered by a combined Anglo-Dutch naval and marine force and after that held in the name of Charles III by a joint force, until Britain acquired this strategic position for itself in 1713.

Despite frictions with Dutch deputies and generals Anglo-Dutch cooperation in the military and diplomatic field was usually excellent, thanks to the rapport between Heinsius and Marlborough. The former supported Marlborough during the clash with General Slangenburg after the Battle of Ekeren and facilitated Slangenburgh's removal, despite his heroic status in Dutch public opinion. Cooperation with other Dutch generals like Henry de Nassau, Lord Overkirk at the battles of Elixheim, Ramillies, and Oudenaarde, and later with the Count of Tilly and John William Friso at Malplaquet was much improved, as was the relationship with the field deputies, especially Sicco van Goslinga.

Marlborough and Prince Eugene of Savoy's successes in the field resulted in the Southern Netherlands being mostly cleared of French forces in the course of 1708. A joint Anglo-Dutch military occupation of this country was now established in which the Dutch economic interest predominated. The Dutch sought partial compensation in this for the English economic predominance that the allied operations in the Iberian Peninsula had brought about in Portugal and Spain. Like Portugal for Britain, the Southern Netherlands were now transformed into a captive market for the Dutch, by restoring the favorable Spanish tariff list of 1680 to replace the recent French mercantilist measures.

The Dutch also hoped to limit the prospective Habsburg control of the Southern Netherlands and to transform it into an Austro-Dutch codominion by a new, improved form of the Barrier provisions of the Treaty of Ryswick. Heinsius now offered Great Britain (as it had become through the Acts of Union 1707) a guarantee of the Protestant Succession in exchange for British support for a Dutch right to garrison whichever, and as many towns and fortresses in the Austrian Netherlands, as the States General wished for. This exchange of guarantees (which both countries would come to regret) led to the Barrier Treaty of 1709. Under it, the Dutch had to send 6,000 troops to England during the Jacobite rising of 1715 and Jacobite rising of 1745.

By 1710 the war had, despite these Allied successes, turned into a stalemate. Both the French and Dutch were exhausted and yearning for peace. Louis now embarked on an attempt to divide the Allies by dangling the prospect of a favorable separate peace before the noses of the Dutch. During the not-so-secret Geertruidenberg negotiations of the Spring of 1710 Louis offered to accept the removal of his grandson Philip from the Spanish throne in favor of Charles III, in exchange for the Habsburg territories in Italy as compensation for Philip. He tempted the Dutch with their craved-for Barrier in the Austrian Netherlands and a return to the favorable French tariff list of 1664 and other economic concessions.

The Dutch government was severely tempted, but declined for a complex of reasons. Not only would such a separate peace be dishonorable in their view, but it would also earn them the enduring enmity of the British and Austrians. They remembered how difficult it had been to restore friendship with their allies after they had fallen for Louis enticements at the peace of Nijmegen in 1678 and left their friends in the lurch. They also remembered how often Louis had broken his word previously. The deal-breaker was that they expected Louis to turn on the Dutch after he had dealt with his other opponents. They would be friendless if that happened. Finally, despite Louis' offer to acquiesce in Philip's removal, he refused to actively participate in such a removal. The allies would have to do it themselves. Heinsius and his colleagues saw no alternative to continuing the war.

== The Peace of Utrecht and the Second Great Assembly ==
Louis eventually tired of his fruitless attempts to pry the Dutch loose from the Grand Alliance, and turned his attentions to Great Britain. It had not escaped his attention that great political changes had taken place there. Though Queen Anne was less partial than William III to the Whigs, she had soon discovered that she could as yet not govern with sole support of the Tories and had since the early experiments with a Tory government had a moderate Tory government with Whig support under Sidney Godolphin, 1st Earl of Godolphin and the Whig-leaning Marlborough. However, Marlborough's wife Sarah Churchill, Duchess of Marlborough, who had been Queen Anne's favorite for a long time, thereby giving her husband an informal powerbase, had had a falling-out with the Queen over Abigail Masham, Baroness Masham, Sarah's poor relative, who had replaced her in the Queen's favor. After that, Sarah's star declined and with it her husband's. Instead the star of Robert Harley, 1st Earl of Oxford and Earl Mortimer (Abigail's cousin) went into the ascendant, especially after the Tories won the parliamentary elections in 1710.

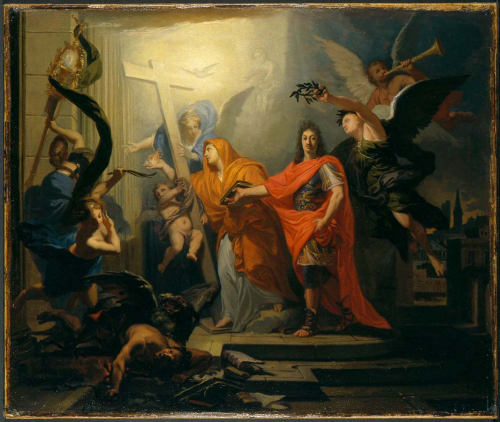
Allegory on the Peace of Utrecht by Antoine Rivatz

Harley formed a new government with Henry St John, 1st Viscount Bolingbroke as Secretary of State and this new government entered into secret negotiations with Louis XIV to conclude a separate peace between Great Britain and France. These negotiations soon achieved success as Louis was prepared to make great concessions (he basically offered the same concessions he had offered to the Dutch, and some more, like the port of Dunkirk as surety for his good intentions) and the new British government did not feel constrained to respect the interests of its Allies in any sense.

If this breach of trust with the Allies was not bad enough, the British government started to actively sabotage the Allied war effort while the war was still progressing full tilt. In May 1712 Bolingbroke ordered the Duke of Ormonde who had succeeded Marlborough as captain-general of the British forces (though not of the Dutch forces, as the Dutch government had transferred command to Prince Eugene) to refrain from taking further part in the hostilities. Bolingbroke informed the French of this instruction, but not the Allies. However, it became evident during the siege of Quesnoy when the French commander, Villars who noticed British forces under the besieging forces, understandably demanded a clarification of Ormonde. The British general then withdrew his forces from the Allied camp and marched away with just the British soldiers (the mercenaries in British pay refused to take part). Ironically, the French felt also hard done by, because they had expected all forces in British pay to disappear, thereby fatally weakening the forces of Prince Eugene. This had been an essential element of the Franco-British agreement. Would France still feel constrained to give up Dunkirk under these circumstances, as promised.

Winston Churchill describes the feelings of the British soldiers thus:

The misery of the readcoats has often been described. Under an iron discipline the veteran regiments and battalions, whose names had hitherto been held in so much honour in the camps of Europe, marched off with downcast eyes, while their comrades of the long war gazed upon them in mute reproach. The strictest orders had been given against recrimination, yet the silence struck a chill in the hearts of British soldiers whom no perils had daunted. But when they reached the end of the march and the ranks were broken terrible scenes were witnessed of humble men breaking their muskets, tearing their hair, and pouring out terrible blasphemies and curses against the Queen and the Ministry who could subject them to that ordeal

The rest of the Allies felt likewise, especially after the Battle of Denain which Prince Eugene lost as a consequence of the weakening of the Allied force, due to the withdrawal of the British troops, with great loss of life to the Dutch and Austrian troops. Bolingbroke congratulated the victor Villars with his victory, adding insult to injury. When it transpired during the formal peace negotiations at Utrecht that the British and French had already struck a secret deal disillusionment and despair swept the Dutch and Austrians. In the Hague there were anti-British riots and there was even talk of a Fourth Anglo-Dutch War, sixty-eight years before such a war actually would break out. Austria and the Republic briefly tried to continue the war on their own, but the Dutch and Prussians soon came to the conclusion that it was a hopeless quest. Only the Austrians fought on.

Consequently, on 11 April 1713 the Treaty of Utrecht (1713) was signed by France and most of the Allies. France made most of the concessions, but not as many as would have been the case if the Harley-Bolingbroke government had not betrayed its allies. Great Britain came off best, with territorial concessions in Spain (Gibraltar and Minorca), and North America, while the Asiento de Negros was transferred by Spain to the British government, which gave it to the newly-formed South Sea Company. The big loser was Charles III who did not get the Spanish Crown about which the whole war had started. However, Charles had become Holy Roman Emperor himself in the meantime, which decidedly dampened the enthusiasm of the Allies to support his claims. Doing so would have tilted the balance of power in Europe in a pro-Habsburg way. However, as compensation Austria received the former Spanish Netherlands, more or less intact, besides the former Spanish possessions in Italy (except Sicily which went to Savoy but was later exchanged with Austria for Sardinia).

Though much has been made of the fact that the Republic decidedly came off second best (the taunt by the French negotiator, Melchior de Polignac, "De vous, chez vous, sans vous", meaning that the Peace Congress had decided over the Dutch interests in their own country, but without them, still rankles), they actually attained most of their war aims: the desired codominion over the Austrian Netherlands, and the Barrier of fortresses in that country, were attained under the Austro-Dutch Treaty of November 1715 (France already having acquiesced at Utrecht), though the Dutch, due to British obstruction, did not gain all they had hoped for.

The Treaty of Ryswick was reconfirmed (as a matter of fact, the Franco-Dutch part of the Treaty of Utrecht is almost synonymous with that treaty; only the preambles differ) and this implied important economic concessions by the French, particularly the return to the French tariff list of 1664. Important in the economic field was also that the closing of the Scheldt to trade with Antwerp was once again confirmed.

Still, disillusionment in government circles of the Republic was great. Heinsius policy of alliance with Great Britain was in ruins, which he personally took very hard. It has been said that he was a broken man afterwards and never regained his prestige and influence, even though he remained in office as Grand Pensionary until his death in 1720. Relations with Great Britain were very strained as long as the Harley-Bolingbroke ministry remained in office. This was only for a short time, however, as they fell in disfavor after the death of Queen Anne and the accession to the British throne of the Elector of Hanover, George I of Great Britain in August 1714. Both were impeached and Bolingbroke would spend the remainder of his life in exile in France. The new king greatly preferred the Whigs and in the new Ministry Marlborough returned to power. The Republic and Great Britain now entered on a long-lasting period of amity, which would last as long as the Whigs were in power.

The policy of working in tandem between the Republic and Great Britain was definitively a thing of the past, however. The Dutch had lost their trust in the British. The Republic now embarked on a policy of Neutralism, which would last until the end of the stadtholderless period. To put it differently: the Republic resigned voluntarily as a Great Power. As soon as the peace was signed the States General started disbanding the Dutch army. Troop strength was reduced from 130,000 in 1713 to 40,000 (about the pre-1672 strength) in 1715. The reductions in the navy were comparable. This was a decisive change, because other European powers kept their armies and navies up to strength.

The main reason for this voluntary resignation, so to speak, was the dire situation of the finances of the Republic. The Dutch had financed the wars of William III primarily with borrowing. Consequently, the public debt had risen from 38 million guilders after the end of the Franco-Dutch war in 1678 to the staggering sum of 128 million guilders in 1713. In itself this need not be debilitating, but the debt-service of this tremendous debt consumed almost all of the normal tax revenue. Something evidently had to give. The tax burden was already appreciable and the government felt that could not be increased. The only feasible alternative seemed to be reductions in expenditures, and as most government expenditures were in the military sphere, that is where they had to be made.

However, there was another possibility, at least in theory, to get out from under the debt burden and retain the Republic's military stature: fiscal reform. The quota system which determined the contributions of the seven provinces to the communal budget had not been revised since 1616 and had arguably grown skewed. But this was just one symptom of the debilitating particularism of the government of the Republic. The secretary of the Raad van State (Council of State) Simon van Slingelandt privately enumerated a number of necessary constitutional reforms in his Political Discourses(which would only be published posthumously in 1785) and he set to work in an effort to implement them.

On the initiative of the States of Overijssel the States-General were convened in a number of extraordinary sessions, collectively known as the Tweede Grote Vergadering (Second Great Assembly, a kind of Constitutional Convention) of the years 1716–7 to discuss his proposals. The term was chosen as a reminder of the Great Assembly of 1651 which inaugurated the first stadtholderless period. But that first Great Assembly had been a special congress of the provincial States, whereas in this case only the States General were involved. Nevertheless, the term is appropriate, because no less than a revision of the Union of Utrecht-treaty was intended.

As secretary of the Raad van State (a federal institution) Van Slingelandt was able to take a federal perspective, as opposed to a purely provincial perspective, as most other politicians (even the Grand Pensionary) were wont to do. One of the criticisms Van Slingelandt made, was that unlike in the early years of the Republic (which he held up as a positive example) majority-voting was far less common, leading to debilitating deadlock in the decisionmaking. As a matter of fact, one of the arguments of the defenders of the stadtholderate was that article 7 of the Union of Utrecht had charged the stadtholders of the several provinces (there was still supposed to be more than one at that time) with breaking such deadlocks in the States-General through arbitration. Van Slingelandt, however (not surprisingly in view of his position in the Raad van State), proposed a different solution to the problem of particularism: he wished to revert to a stronger position of the Raad as an executive organ for the Republic, as had arguably existed before the inclusion of two English members in that council under the governorate-general of the Earl of Leicester in 1586 (which membership lasted until 1625) necessitated the emasculation of that council by Johan van Oldenbarnevelt. A strong executive (but not an "eminent head", the alternative the Orangists always preferred) would in his view bring about the other reforms necessary to reform the public finances, that in turn would bring about the restoration of the Republic as a leading military and diplomatic power. (And this in turn would enable the Republic to reverse the trend among its neighbors to put protectionist measures in the path of Dutch trade and industry, which already were beginning to cause the steep decline of the Dutch economy in these years. The Republic had previously been able to counter such measures by diplomatic, even military, means.) Unfortunately, vested interests were too strong, and despite much debate the Great Assembly came to nothing.

== The Van Hoornbeek and Van Slingelandt terms in office ==
Apparently, Van Slingelandt's efforts at reform not only failed, but he had made so many enemies trying to implement them, that his career was interrupted. When Heinsius died in August 1720 Van Slingelandt was pointedly passed over for the office of Grand Pensionary and it was given to Isaac van Hoornbeek. Van Hoornbeek had been pensionary of the city of Rotterdam and as such he represented that city in the States-General. During Heinsius' term in office he often assisted the Grand Pensionary in a diplomatic capacity and in managing the political troubles between the provinces. He was, however, more a civil servant, than a politician by temperament. This militated against his taking a role as a forceful political leader, as other Grand Pensionaries, like Johan de Witt, and to a lesser extent, Gaspar Fagel and Heinsius had been.

This is probably just the way his backers liked it. Neutralist sentiment was still strong in the years following the Barrier Treaty with Austria of 1715. The Republic felt safe from French incursions behind the string of fortresses in the Austrian Netherlands it was now allowed to garrison. Besides, under the Regency of Philippe II, Duke of Orléans after the death of Louis XIV, France hardly formed a menace. Though the States-General viewed the acquisitive policies of Frederick William I of Prussia on the eastern frontier of the Republic with some trepidation this as yet did not form a reason to seek safety in defensive alliances. Nevertheless, other European powers did not necessarily accept such an aloof posture (used as they were to the hyperactivity in the first decade of the century), and the Republic was pressured to become part of the Quadruple Alliance and take part in its war against Spain after 1718. However, though the Republic formally acceded to the Alliance, obstruction of the city of Amsterdam, which feared for its trade interests in Spain and its colonies, prevented an active part of the Dutch military (though the Republic's diplomats hosted the peace negotiations that ended the war).

On the internal political front all had been quiet since the premature death of John William Friso in 1711. He had a posthumous son, William IV, Prince of Orange, who was born about six weeks after his death. That infant was no serious candidate for any official post in the Republic, though the Frisian States faithfully promised to appoint him to their stadtholdership, once he would come of age. In the meantime his mother Marie Louise of Hesse-Kassel (like her mother-in-law before her) acted as regent for him in Friesland, and pursued the litigation over the inheritance of William III with Frederick William of Prussia.

But Orangism as a political force remained dormant until in 1718 the States of Friesland formally designated him their future stadtholder, followed the next year by the States of Groningen. In 1722 the States of Drenthe followed suit, but what made the other provinces suspicious was that the same year Orangists in the States of Gelderland started agitating to make him prospective stadtholder there too. This was a new development, as stadtholders of the House of Nassau-Dietz previously had only served in the three northern provinces mentioned just now. Holland, Zeeland and Overijssel therefore tried to intervene, but the Gelderland Orangists prevailed, though the States of Gelderland at the same time drew up an Instructie (commission) that almost reduced his powers to nothing, certainly compared to the authority William III had possessed under the Government Regulations of 1675. Nevertheless, this decision of Gelderland caused a backlash in the other stadtholderless provinces that reaffirmed their firm rejection of a new stadtholderate in 1723.

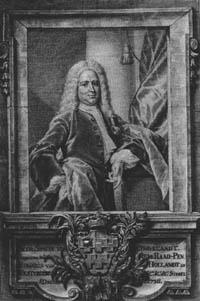
Grand Pensionary Simon van Slingelandt

When Van Hoornbeek died in office in 1727 Van Slingelandt finally got his chance as Grand Pensionary, though his suspected Orangist leanings caused his principals to demand a verbal promise that he would maintain the stadtholderless regime. He also had to promise that he would not try again to bring about constitutional reforms.

William IV came of age in 1729 and was duly appointed stadtholder in Friesland, Groningen, Drenthe and Gelderland. Holland barred him immediately from the Raad van State (and also of the captaincy-general of the Union) on the pretext that his appointment would give the northern provinces an undue advantage. In 1732 he concluded the Treaty of Partition over the contested inheritance of the Prince of Orange with his rival Frederick William. By the terms of the treaty, William and Frederick William agreed to recognize each other as Princes of Orange. William also got the right to refer to his House as Orange-Nassau. As a result of the treaty, William's political position improved appreciably. It now looked as if the mighty Prussian king would start supporting him in the politics of the Republic.

One consequence of the settlement was that the Prussian king removed his objections to the assumption by William IV of the dignity of First Noble in the States of Zeeland, on the basis of his ownership of the Marquisates of Veere and Vlissingen. To block such a move the States of Zeeland (who did not want him in their midst) first offered to buy the two marquisates, and when he refused, compulsorily bought them, depositing the purchase price in an escrow account.

On a different front the young stadtholder improved his position through a marriage alliance with the British royal house of Hanover. George II of Great Britain was not very secure in his hold on his throne and hoped to strengthen it by offering his daughter Anne in marriage to what he mistook for an influential politician of the Republic, with which, after all old ties existed, reaching back to the Glorious Revolution. At first Van Slingelandt reacted negatively to the proposal with such vehemence that the project was held in abeyance for a few years, but eventually he ran out of excuses and William and Anne were married at St. James's Palace in London in March 1734. The States-General were barely polite, merely congratulating the king on selecting a son-in-law from "a free republic such as ours." The poor princess, used to a proper royal court, was buried for the next thirteen years in the provincial mediocrity of the stadtholder's court in Leeuwarden.

Nevertheless, the royal marriage was an indication that the Republic was at least still perceived in European capitals as a power that was worth wooing for the other powers. Despite its neutralist preferences the Republic had been dragged into the Alliance of Hanover of 1725. Though this alliance was formally intended to counter the alliance between Austria and Spain, the Republic hoped it would be a vehicle to manage the king of Prussia, who was trying to get his hands on the Duchy of Jülich that abutted Dutch territory, and threatened to engulf Dutch Generality Lands in Prussian territory.

These are just examples of the intricate minuets European diplomats danced in this first third of the 18th century and in which Van Slingelandt tried his best to be the dance master. The Republic almost got involved in the War of the Polish Succession, to such an extent that it was forced to increase its army just at the time it had hoped to be able to reduce it appreciably. Van Slingelandt played an important part as an intermediary in bringing about peace in that conflict between the Bourbon and Habsburg powers in 1735.

== Decline of the Republic ==
The political history of the Republic after the Peace of Utrecht, but before the upheavals of the 1740s, is characterized by a certain blandness (not only in the Republic, to be sure; the contemporary long-lasting Ministry of Robert Walpole in Great Britain equally elicits little passion). In Dutch historiography the sobriquet Pruikentijd (periwig era) is often used, in a scornful way. This is because one associates it with the long decline of the Republic in the political, diplomatic and military fields, that may have started earlier, but became manifest toward the middle of the century. The main cause of this decline lay, however, in the economic field.

The Republic became a Great Power in the middle of the 17th century because of the primacy of its trading system. The riches its merchants, bankers and industrialists accumulated enabled the Dutch state to erect a system of public finance that was unsurpassed for early modern Europe. That system enabled it to finance a military apparatus that was the equal of those of far larger contemporary European powers, and thus to hold its own in the great conflicts around the turn of the 18th century. The limits of this system were however reached at the end of the War of Spanish Succession, and the Republic was financially exhausted, just like France.

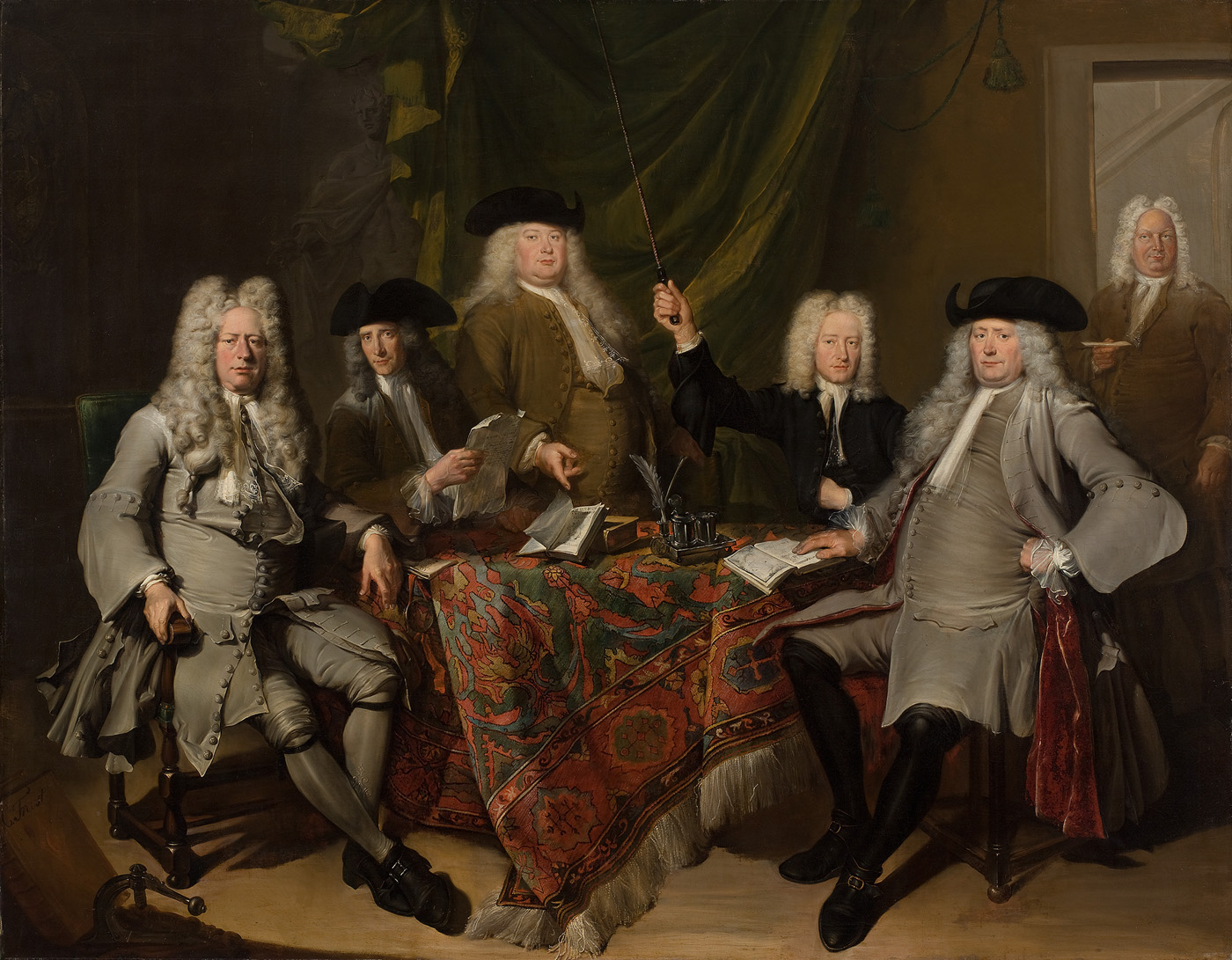
Image from the Periwig Era by Cornelis Troost

However, unlike France, the Republic was unable to restore its finances in the next decades and the reason for this inability was that the health of the underlying economy had already started to decline. The cause of this was a complex of factors. First and foremost, the "industrial revolution" that had been the basis of Dutch prosperity in the Golden Age, went into reverse. Because of the reversal of the secular trend of European price levels around 1670 (secular inflation turning into deflation) and the downward-stickiness of nominal wages, Dutch real wages (already high in boom times) became prohibitively high for the Dutch export industries, making Dutch industrial products uncompetitive. This competitive disadvantage was magnified by the protectionist measures that first France, and after 1720 also Prussia, the Scandinavian countries, and Russia took to keep Dutch industrial export products out. Dutch export industries were therefore deprived of their major markets and withered at the vine.

The contrast with Great Britain, that was confronted with similar challenges at the time, is instructive. English industry would have become equally uncompetitive, but it was able to compensate for the loss of markets in Europe, by its grip on captive markets in its American colonies, and in the markets in Portugal, Spain, and the Spanish colonial empire it had gained (replacing the Dutch) as a consequence of the Peace of Utrecht. This is where the British really gained, and the Dutch really lost, from that peculiar peace deal. The Republic lacked the imperial power, large navy, and populous colonies that Great Britain used to sustain its economic growth.

The decline in Dutch exports (especially textiles) caused a decline in the "rich" trades also, because after all, trade is always two-sided. The Republic could not just offer bullion, as Spain had been able to do in its heyday, to pay for its imports. It is true that the other mainstay of Dutch trade: the carrying trade in which the Republic offered shipping services, for a long time remained important. The fact that the Republic was able to remain neutral in most wars that Great Britain fought, and that Dutch shipping enjoyed immunity from English inspection for contraband, due to the Treaty of Breda (1667) (confirmed at the Treaty of Westminster (1674)), certainly gave Dutch shipping a competitive advantage above its less fortunate competitors, added to the already greater efficiency that Dutch ships enjoyed. (The principle of "free ship, free goods" made Dutch shippers the carriers-of-choice for belligerent and neutral alike, to avoid confiscations by the British navy). But these shipping services did not have an added value comparable to that of the "rich trades." In any case, though the volume of the Dutch Baltic trade remained constant, the volume of that of other countries grew. The Dutch Baltic trade declined therefore relatively.

During the first half of the 18th century the "rich trades" from Asia, in which the VOC played a preponderant role, still remained strong, but here also superficial flowering was deceptive. The problem was low profitability. The VOC for a while dominated the Malabar and Coromandel coasts in India, successfully keeping its English, French, and Danish competitors at bay, but by 1720 it became clear that the financial outlay for the military presence it had to maintain, outweighed the profits. The VOC therefore quietly decided to abandon India to its competitors. Likewise, though the VOC followed the example of its competitors in changing its "business model" in favor of wholesale trade in textiles, Chinaware, tea and coffee, from the old emphasis of the high-profit spices (in which it had a near-monopoly), and grew to double its old size, becoming the largest company in the world, this was mainly "profitless growth."

Ironically, this relative decline of the Dutch economy through increased competition from abroad was partly due to the behavior of Dutch capitalists. The Dutch economy had grown explosively in the 17th century because of retention and reinvestment of profits. Capital begat capital. However, the fastly accumulating fund of Dutch capital had to be profitably reinvested. Because of the structural changes in the economic situation investment opportunities in the Dutch economy became scarcer just at the time when the perceived risk of investing in more lucrative ventures abroad became smaller. Dutch capitalists therefore started on a large foreign direct investment boom, especially in Great Britain, where the "Dutch" innovations in the capital market (e.g. the funded public debt) after the founding of the Bank of England in 1696 had promoted the interconnection of the capital markets of both countries. Ironically, Dutch investors now helped finance the EIC, the Bank of England itself, and many other English economic ventures that helped to bring about rapid economic growth in England at the same time that growth in the Republic came to a standstill.

This continued accumulation of capital mostly accrued to a small capitalist elite that slowly acquired the characteristics of a rentier-class. This type of investor was risk-averse and therefore preferred investment in liquid, financial assets like government bonds (foreign or domestic) over productive investments like shipping, mercantile inventory, industrial stock or agricultural land, like its ancestors had held. They literally had a vested interest in the funded public debt of the Dutch state, and as this elite was largely the same as the political elite (both Orangist and States Party) their political actions were often designed to protect that interest. Unlike in other nation states in financial difficulty, defaulting on the debt, or diluting its value by inflation, would be unthinkable; the Dutch state fought for its public credit to the bitter end. At the same time, anything that would threaten that credit was anathema to this elite. Hence the wish of the government to avoid policies that would threaten its ability to service the debt, and its extreme parsimony in public expenditures after 1713 (which probably had a negative Keynesian effect on the economy also).

Of course, the economic decline eroded the revenue base on which the debt service depended. This was the main constraint on deficit spending, not the lending capacity of Dutch capitalists. Indeed, in later emergencies the Republic had no difficulty in doubling, even redoubling the public debt, but because of the increased debt service this entailed, such expansions of the public debt made the tax burden unbearable in the public's view. That tax burden was borne unequally by the several strata of Dutch society, as it was heavily skewed toward excises and other indirect taxes, whereas wealth, income and commerce were as yet lightly taxed, if at all. The result was that the middle strata of society were severely squeezed in the declining economic situation, characterized by increasing poverty of the lower strata. And the regents were well aware of this, which increased their reluctance to augment the tax burden, so as to avoid public discontent getting out of hand. A forlorn hope, as we will see.

The States-Party regime therefore earnestly attempted to keep expenditure low. And as we have seen, this meant primarily economizing on military expenditures, as these comprised the bulk of the federal budget. The consequence was what amounted to unilateral disarmament (though fortunately this was only dimly perceived by predatory foreign powers, who for a long time remained duly deterred by the fierce reputation the Republic had acquired under the stadtholderate of William III). Disarmament necessitated a modest posture in foreign affairs exactly at the time that foreign protectionist policies might have necessitated diplomatic countermeasures, backed by military might (as the Republic had practiced against Scandinavian powers during the first stadtholderless period). Of course, the Republic could have retaliated peacefully (as it did in 1671, when it countered France's Colbert tariff list, with equally draconian tariffs on French wine), but because the position of the Dutch entrepot (which gave it a stranglehold on the French wine trade in 1671) had declined appreciably also, this kind of retaliation would be self-defeating. Equally, protectionist measures like Prussia's banning of all textile imports in the early 1720s (to protect its own infant textile industry) could not profitably be emulated by the Dutch government, because the Dutch industry was already mature and did not need protection; it needed foreign markets, because the Dutch home market was too small for it to be profitable.

All of this goes to show that (also in hindsight) it is not realistic to blame the States-Party regime for the economic malaise. Even if they had been aware of the underlying economic processes (and this is doubtful, though some contemporaries were, like Isaac de Pinto in his later published Traité de la Circulation et du Crédit) it is not clear what they could have done about it, as far as the economy as a whole is concerned, though they could arguably have reformed the public finances. As it was, only a feeble attempt to restructure the real estate tax (verponding) was made by Van Slingelandt, and later an attempt to introduce a primitive form of income tax (the Personeel Quotisatie of 1742).

The economic decline caused appalling phenomena, like the accelerating deindustrialization after the early 1720s. Because less replacement and new merchant vessels were required with a declining trade level, the timber trade and shipbuilding industry of the Zaan district went into a disastrous slump, the number of shipyards declining from over forty in 1690 to twenty-three in 1750. The linen-weaving industry was decimated in Twenthe and other inland areas, as was the whale oil, sail-canvas and rope-making industry in the Zaan. And these are only a few examples. And deindustrialization brought deurbanization with it, as the job losses drove the urban population to rural areas where they still could earn a living. As a consequence, uniquely in early-18th-century Europe, Dutch cities shrunk in size, where everywhere else countries became more urbanized, and cities grew.

Of course these negative economic and social developments had their influence on popular opinion and caused rising political discontent with the stadtholderless regime. It may be that (as Dutch historians like L.J. Rogier have argued) there had been a marked deterioration in the quality of regent government, with a noticeable increase in corruption and nepotism (though coryphaei of the stadtholderate eras like Cornelis Musch, Johan Kievit and Johan van Banchem had been symptomatic of the same endemic sickness during the heyday of the Stadtholderate), though people were more tolerant of this than nowadays. It certainly was true that the governing institutions of the Republic were perennially deadlocked, and the Republic had become notorious for its indecisiveness (though, again this might be exaggerated). Though blaming the regents for the economic malaise would be equally unjust as blaming the Chinese emperors for losing the favor of Heaven, the Dutch popular masses were equally capable of such a harsh judgment as the Chinese ones.

What remained for the apologists of the regime to defend it from the Orangist attacks was the claim that it promoted "freedom" in the sense of the "True Freedom" of the De Witt regime from the previous stadtholderless regime, with all that comprised: religious and intellectual toleration, and the principle that power is more responsibly wielded, and exercised in the public interest, if it is dispersed, with the dynastic element, embodied in the stadtholderate, removed. The fervently anti-Orangist regent Levinus Ferdinand de Beaufort added a third element: that the regime upheld civil freedom and the dignity of the individual, in his Verhandeling van de vryheit in den Burgerstaet (Treatise about freedom in the Civilian State; 1737). This became the centerpiece of a broad public polemic between Orangists and anti-Orangists about the ideological foundation of the alternative regimes, which was not without importance for the underpinning of the liberal revolutions later in the century. In it the defenders of the stadtholderless regime reminded their readers that the stadtholders had always acted like enemies of the "true freedom" of the Republic, and that William III had usurped an unacceptable amount of power. Tragically, these warnings would be ignored in the crisis that ended the regime in the next decade.

== Crisis and the Orangist revolution of 1747 ==
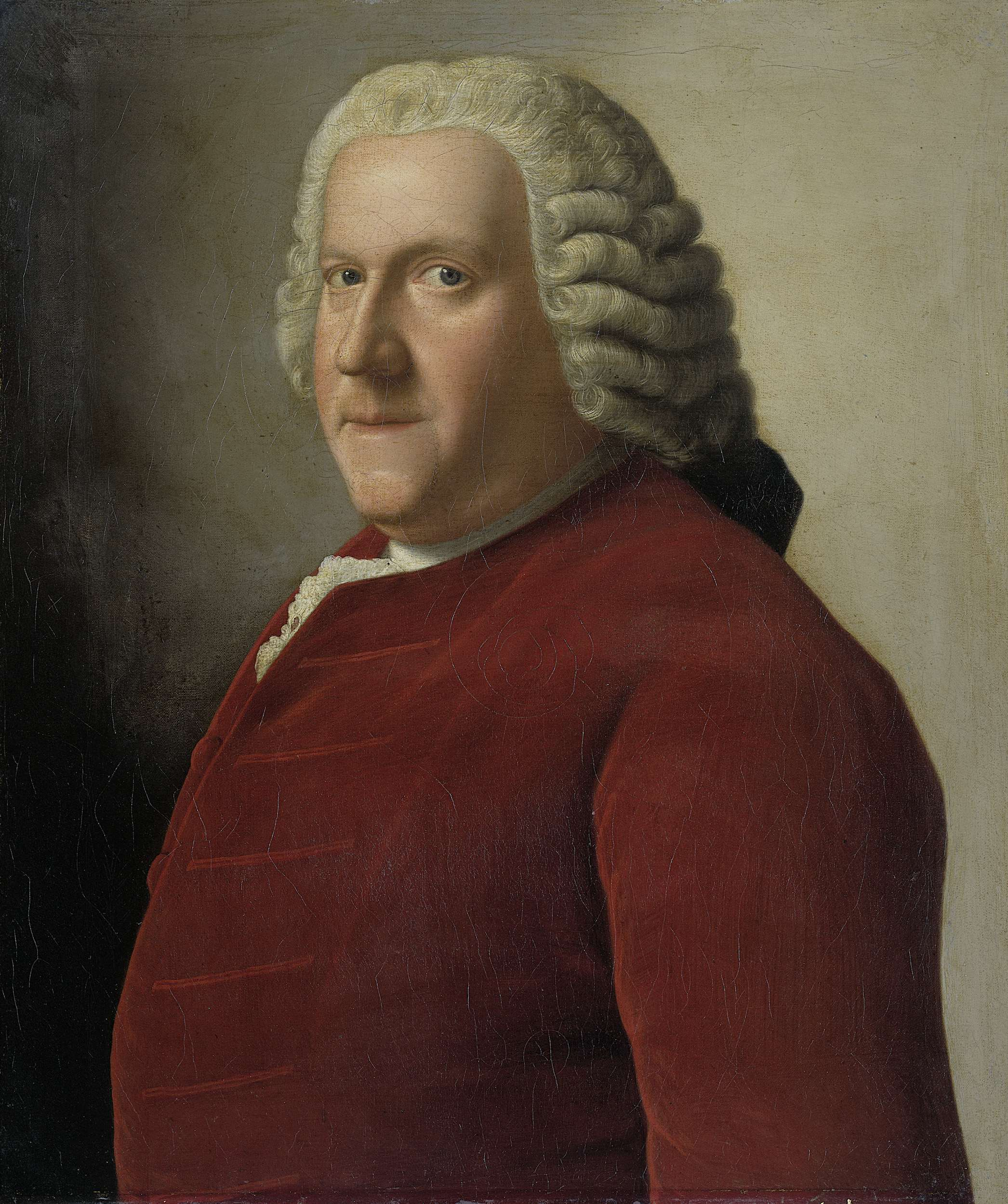
Bentinck van Rhoon, pastel by Liotard

Anthonie van der Heim succeeded Simon van Slingelandt as Grand Pensionary in 1736 after a protracted power struggle, promising in writing to oppose the resurrection of the stadtholderate. During his tenure, the Republic slowly drifted into the War of the Austrian Succession. Initially, the Republic tried to remain neutral. However, its garrisons in various fortresses in the Austrian Netherlands, such as Menen and Tournai, implicitly defended the region against France and so relieved Austria. This led to a strengthening of the Dutch army in order to maintain European standards.

In 1744, the French targeted the Dutch fortresses of Menen and Tournai, another Dutch barrier fortress. This prompted the Republic to join the Quadruple Alliance and send a relieving army under Prince William, Duke of Cumberland. However, the Dutch suffered a severe defeat at the Battle of Fontenoy in 1745. The French proceeded to occupy most major cities in the Austrian Netherlands, and in April 1747, they occupied States Flanders.

The French invasion exposed the weakness of the Dutch defenses, and the Dutch population, recalling the French invasion in the Year of Disaster of 1672, demanded the restoration of the stadtholderate. This period also saw growing radical unrest, with many citizens feeling the effects of a weak economy and a sense of insecurity due to the war. The Orangist revolution started in Zeeland but spread to Holland and then other provinces, with fervent supporters of the House of Orange pushing for William IV to become Stadtholder in all the provinces and captain-general of the Union as well as targeting Catholics and republicans. He assumed the position in 1747, but his military leadership at the Battle of Lauffeld left much to be desired. The war eventually concluded with the Treaty of Aix-la-Chapelle in 1748, and the French withdrew from the Dutch frontier. Despite the end of the conflict, the political and social unrest continued, as the democratic Doelisten movement fueled further revolutionary movements in the Dutch Republic.

The unrest and tax riots, known as the Pachtersoproer, spread throughout Holland, with houses of tax farmers being ransacked in various cities. During these riots, the civic militia refused to intervene but used the opportunity to present their own political demands, such as the right to elect their own officers and the enforcement of laws respecting the Sabbath. Meanwhile, Orangist agitator William Bentinck and others continued to demand political concessions from the States Party regents, pushing for the hereditary Stadtholdership in both male and female lines of William IV - at the time William only had a daughter. Amidst the growing unrest, William IV's response to purging the Amsterdam Vroedschap was half-hearted, leaving the populace disaffected. This marked the first clear break between the new regime and a large part of its popular following, as the people's expectations were not met by the stadtholder's actions. Unfortunately, whether William IV could have lived up to the high expectations placed on him remains unknown, as he suddenly died at the age of 40 on 22 October 1751.

== Aftermath ==
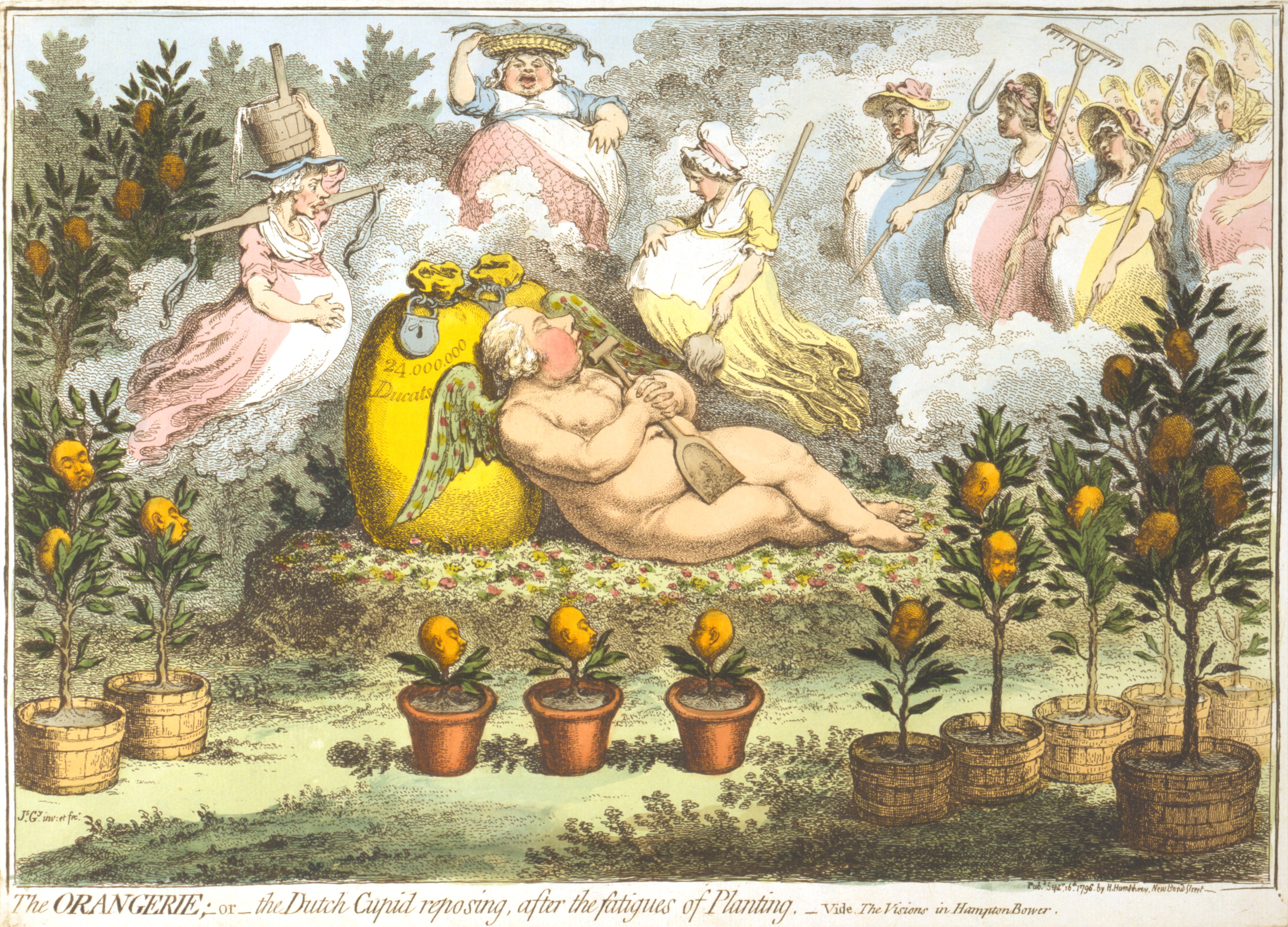
Cartoon of William V by James Gilray

The fact that giving dictatorial powers to a "strong man" is often bad politics, and usually leads to severe disappointment, was once again demonstrated in the aftermath of William IV's short stadtholderate. He was immediately succeeded as hereditary "Stadtholder-General" in all provinces by William V, Prince of Orange, all of three years at the time. Of course, his mother was immediately charged with the regency, and she delegated most of its powers to Bentinck and her favorite, Duke Louis Ernest of Brunswick-Lüneburg. The Duke was made captain-general of the Union (the first time a non-stadtholder achieved the full rank; even Marlborough had only been lieutenant—captain-general) in 1751 and held that position until William's maturity in 1766. His was not a happy regency. It was characterized by excessive corruption and misrule as the Republic had not yet seen. The Duke cannot be fully blamed for that personally, as he seems to have been well-intentioned in general. But the fact that all power now was concentrated in the hands of an unaccountable few, like the Frisian nobleman Douwe Sirtema van Grovestins, made abuse of power all the more likely (as the proponents of the "True Freedom" had often warned).

After the coming of age of the new stadtholder, the Duke retreated into the shadows, but a secret Acte van Consulentschap (Act of Advisorship) ensured his continued influence over the young and not very decisive Prince, whereas Bentinck lost influence. The Duke was very unpopular (he was the target of assassination attempts), which eventually led to his removal on the insistence of the new manifestation of the States Party: the Patriots. The Prince now tried to govern alone, but as his competence fell short he only managed to hasten the fall of his regime. What had been gained by deft exploitation of mob violence in 1747, could be taken away by equally deft use of popular unrest in the early and middle 1780s. The mishandling of the Fourth Anglo-Dutch War by the stadtholderate caused a political and economic crisis in the Republic, with resulted in the Patriot Revolution of 1785–87, which in turn was suppressed by Prussian intervention. The Prince was enabled to continue his autocratic government for a few more years until he was driven into exile in January 1795, after an invasion by French revolutionary armies, that brought the Batavian Republic into being.

== Sources ==
- (in Dutch) Fruin, R. (1901) Geschiedenis der staatsinstellingen in Nederland tot den val der Republiek, M. Nijhoff
- Israel, J.I. (1995), The Dutch Republic: Its Rise, Greatness and Fall, 1477–1806, Oxford University Press, ISBN 0-19-873072-1 hardback, ISBN 0-19-820734-4 paperback
