= Treaty of Warsaw (1745) =

1745 treaty

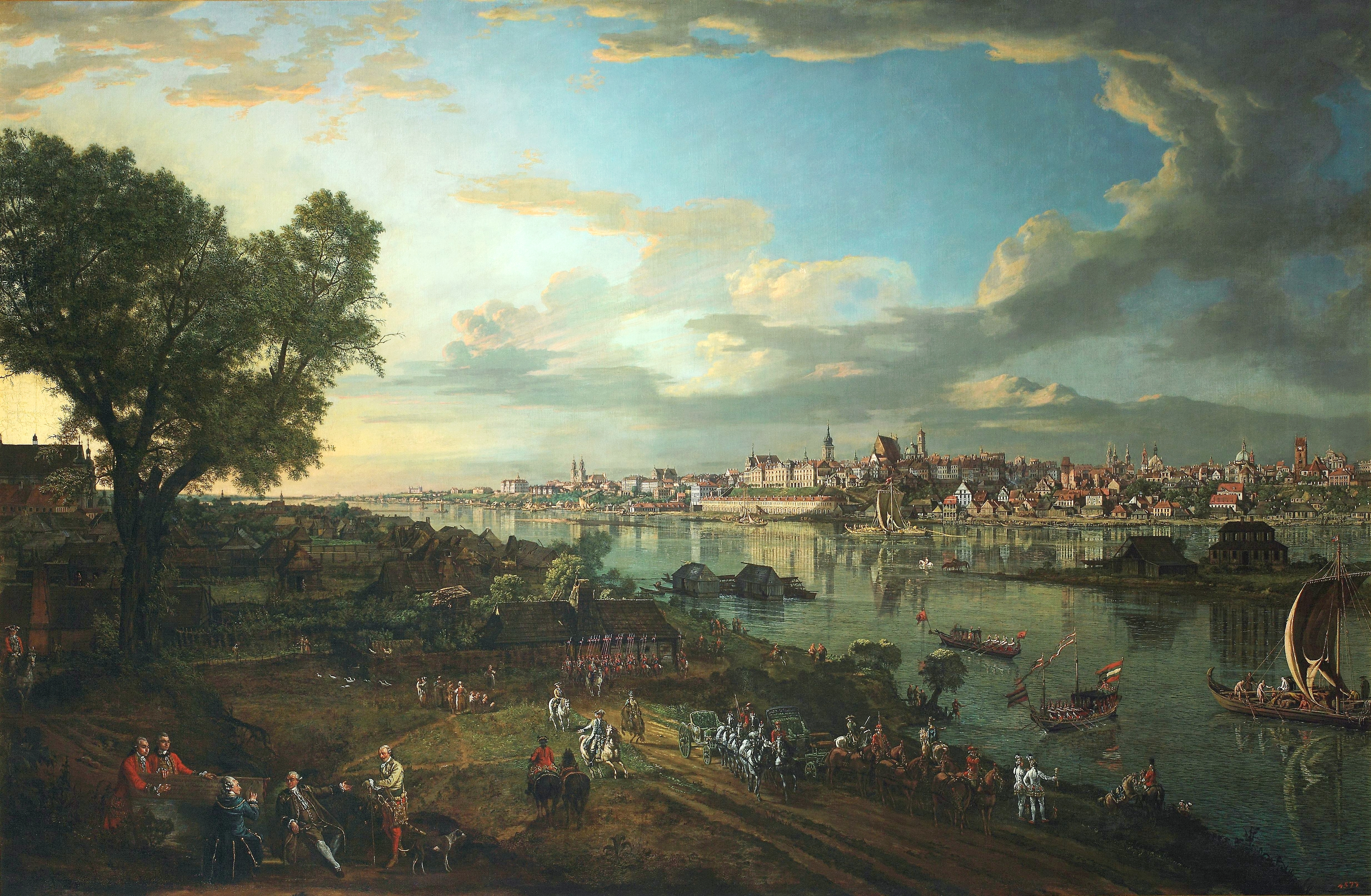
Treaty of Warsaw Praga.jpg

The Treaty of Warsaw (Polish: Traktat warszawski) was a diplomatic agreement signed in Warsaw on 8 January 1745. Its birthplace is traced back to Leipzig, Germany. It was an agreement between Great Britain, the Habsburg monarchy, the Dutch Republic and Saxony (the Quadruple Alliance) to uphold the pragmatic sanction enabling their favoured candidate Maria Theresa to take the throne of the Habsburg monarchy. It also helped the Austro-Saxon alliance secure "the pecuniary support of the maritime powers by the treaty of Warsaw" (Horn, 34).

It brought Saxony into intimate relations with Britain for the first time. It is considered to be merely the specifying and fixing down of what had been shadowed out as secret modifiers stated in the Union of Warsaw. The treaty was for reconquering Silesia and "for cutting down that bad neighbor to something like the demensions proper for a Brandenburg vassal". The treaty also aimed to hold together in affairs of the Reich, unlike the Frankfurt Union, as "30,000 Saxons conjoined to the Austrian force for which the sea powers will furnish subsidy". The treaty was proposed by the Hungarian and Polish majesties' secret articles, an ulterior project; however, the sea powers disagreed to the project.

Notionally a defensive alliance, it came during the War of the Austrian Succession and within months, all the signatories were in an alliance against France. Along with the sudden death of the Bavarian king, it dramatically changed the balance of power in Germany.

The Allies were ultimately successful in securing recognition for Maria Theresa at the Treaty of Aix-la-Chapelle. The Treaty of Warsaw was secret until Frederick the Great discovered it in 1756 and made it known to the world. However, the treaty's terms were never absolutely accomplished.

== Bibliography ==
- Carlyle, Thomas. "Chapter XII." In The Works of Thomas Carlyle, 145–68. Vol. XV. London: Chapman and Hall, 1898.
- Simms, Brendan. Three Victories and a Defeat: The Rise and Fall of the First British Empire. Penguin Books, 2007.
