= William IV, Prince of Orange =

Prince of Orange from 1711 to 1751

William IV
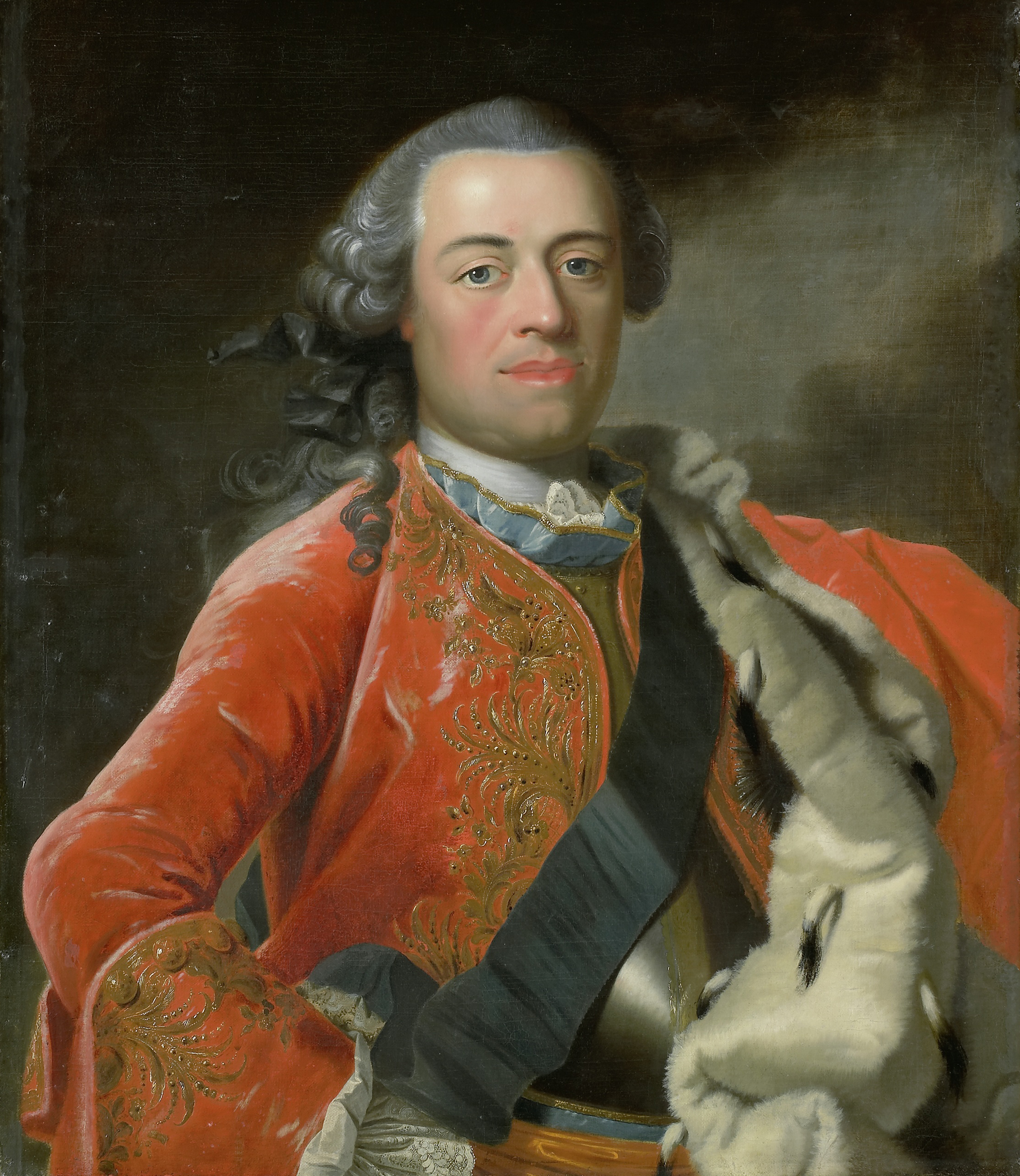
- Portrait, c. 1750

Prince of Orange Prince of Orange-Nassau
- Reign: 1 September 1711 – 22 October 1751
- Predecessor: John William Friso
- Successor: William V

Stadtholder of the United Provinces
- Reign: 4 May 1747 – 22 October 1751
- Predecessor: William III
- Successor: William V
- Born: 1 September 1711; Leeuwarden, Dutch Republic
- Died: 22 October 1751 (aged 40); Huis ten Bosch, The Hague, Dutch Republic
- Burial: 4 February 1752; Nieuwe Kerk, Delft
- Spouse: Anne, Princess Royal (m. 1734)
- Issue Details...: Carolina, Princess of Nassau-Weilburg; Princess Anna; William V, Prince of Orange
- House: Orange-Nassau
- Father: John William Friso, Prince of Orange
- Mother: Marie Louise of Hesse-Kassel

William IV (Willem Karel Hendrik Friso; 1 September 1711 – 22 October 1751) was Prince of Orange from birth and the first hereditary stadtholder of all the United Provinces of the Netherlands from 1747 until his death in 1751.

== Early life ==
Portrait, c. 1724–1738

William was born in Leeuwarden, Netherlands, the posthumous son of John William Friso, Prince of Orange, head of the Frisian branch of the House of Orange-Nassau, and of his wife Landgravine Marie Louise of Hesse-Kassel (or Hesse-Cassel). He was born six weeks after the death of his father.

William succeeded his father as Stadtholder of Friesland and also, under the regency of his mother until 1731, as Stadtholder of Groningen. In 1722 he was elected Stadtholder of Guelders. The four other provinces of the Dutch Republic—Holland, Zeeland, Utrecht and Overijssel—had in 1702 decided not to appoint a stadtholder after the death of stadtholder William III, ushering the Republic into a period that is known as the Second Stadtholderless Period. In 1747 those four provinces also accepted William as their stadtholder.

== Marriage and children ==
In 1733, William was made a Knight of the Order of the Garter. On 25 March 1734, he married at St James's Palace Anne, Princess Royal, eldest daughter of King George II of Great Britain and Caroline of Ansbach. They had three children:

- Princess Carolina of Orange-Nassau (28 February 1743 – 6 May 1787), married Karl Christian of Nassau-Weilburg
- Princess Anna of Orange-Nassau (15 November 1746 – 29 December 1746) died in infancy.
- William V, Prince of Orange (8 March 1748 – 9 April 1806), married Princess Wilhelmina of Prussia

== Later life ==
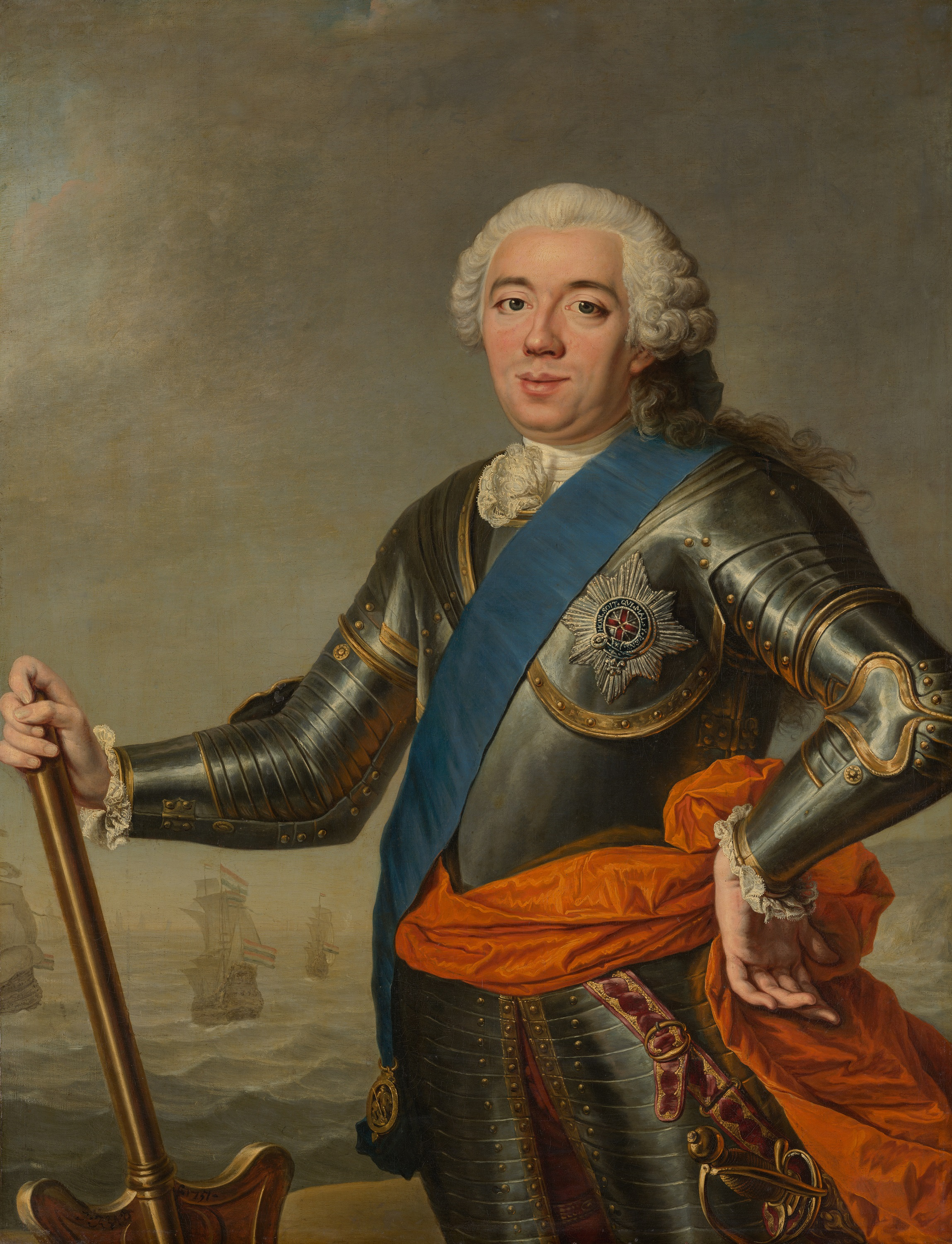
Portrait by Jacques Aved, c. 1751

In 1739 William inherited the estates formerly owned by the Nassau-Dillenburg branch of his family, and in 1743 he inherited those formerly owned by the Nassau-Siegen branch of his family.

In 1740, the War of the Austrian Succession broke out. The conflict pitted Austria against France over the issue of whether Maria Theresa had the right to inherit her father Emperor Charles VI's crown. The Dutch Republic sided with Austria in 1747 in order to maintain a buffer zone between itself and France, whereupon French troops invaded the Austrian Netherlands. In a few weeks, Louis XV's troops conquered most of the towns in the Austrian Netherlands where the Dutch had stationed troops under the Barrier Treaty, as well as the most important towns in Zeelandic Flanders. The Dutch Republic was at the time weakened by internal division. The Dutch decided that their country needed a single strong executive, and turned to the House of Orange. William and his family moved from Leeuwarden to The Hague. On 4 May 1747, the States General of the Netherlands named William General Stadtholder of all seven of the United Provinces of the Netherlands, and made the position hereditary for the first time. William first met Duke Louis Ernest of Brunswick-Lüneburg in 1747, and two years later appointed him field marshal of the Dutch States Army, which later led to Louis Ernest serving as one of the regents for William's heir.

William IV was considered an attractive, educated, and accomplished prince in his prime. Although he had little experience in state affairs, William was at first popular with the people. He stopped the practice of indirect taxation by which independent contractors managed to make large sums for themselves. Nevertheless, he was also a Director-General of the Dutch East India Company, and his alliance with the business class deepened while the disparity between rich and poor grew. William served as General Stadtholder of all the Netherlands until he died of a stroke in 1751 at The Hague.

The county of Orange, Virginia, and the city of Orangeburg, South Carolina, are named after him.

== Ancestry ==
Ancestors of William IV, Prince of Orange

8. William Frederick, Prince of Nassau-Dietz
4. Henry Casimir II, Prince of Nassau-Dietz
9. Countess Albertine Agnes of Nassau
2. John William Friso, Prince of Orange
10. John George II, Prince of Anhalt-Dessau
5. Princess Henriëtte Amalia of Anhalt-Dessau
11. Princess Henriette Catherine of Nassau
1. William IV, Prince of Orange
12. William VI, Landgrave of Hesse-Kassel
6. Charles I, Landgrave of Hesse-Kassel
13. Margravine Hedwig Sophie of Brandenburg
3. Landgravine Marie Louise of Hesse-Kassel
14. Jacob, Duke of Courland
7. Princess Maria Amalia of Courland
15. Margravine Louise Charlotte of Brandenburg

William IV, Prince of Orange House of Orange-Nassau Cadet branch of the House of Nassau Born: 1 September 1711 Died: 22 October 1751
Dutch nobility
Preceded by John William Friso	Prince of Orange; 1711–1751	Vacant Title next held by William V
Regnal titles
Preceded by John William Friso	Prince of Orange-Nassau; Baron of Breda; 1711–1751	Succeeded by William V
Preceded by Francis Alexander	Prince of Nassau-Hadamar; 1739–1751	Succeeded by William V
Preceded by Christian	Prince of Nassau-Dillenburg; 1739–1751	Succeeded by William V
Preceded by Frederick William II	Prince of Nassau-Siegen; 1743–1751	Succeeded by William V
Political offices
Preceded by John William Friso	Stadtholder of Friesland and Groningen; 1711–1747	Titles obsolete merger of all stadtholderships
Vacant Title last held by William III	Stadtholder of Guelders; 1722–1747	Titles obsolete merger of all stadtholderships
Vacant Title last held by William III	Stadtholder of Holland, Zeeland, Utrecht, and Overijssel; 1747	Titles obsolete merger of all stadtholderships
New title	General Stadtholder of the United Provinces; 1747–1751	Succeeded by William V
