= Diez, Germany =

Diez
- Town
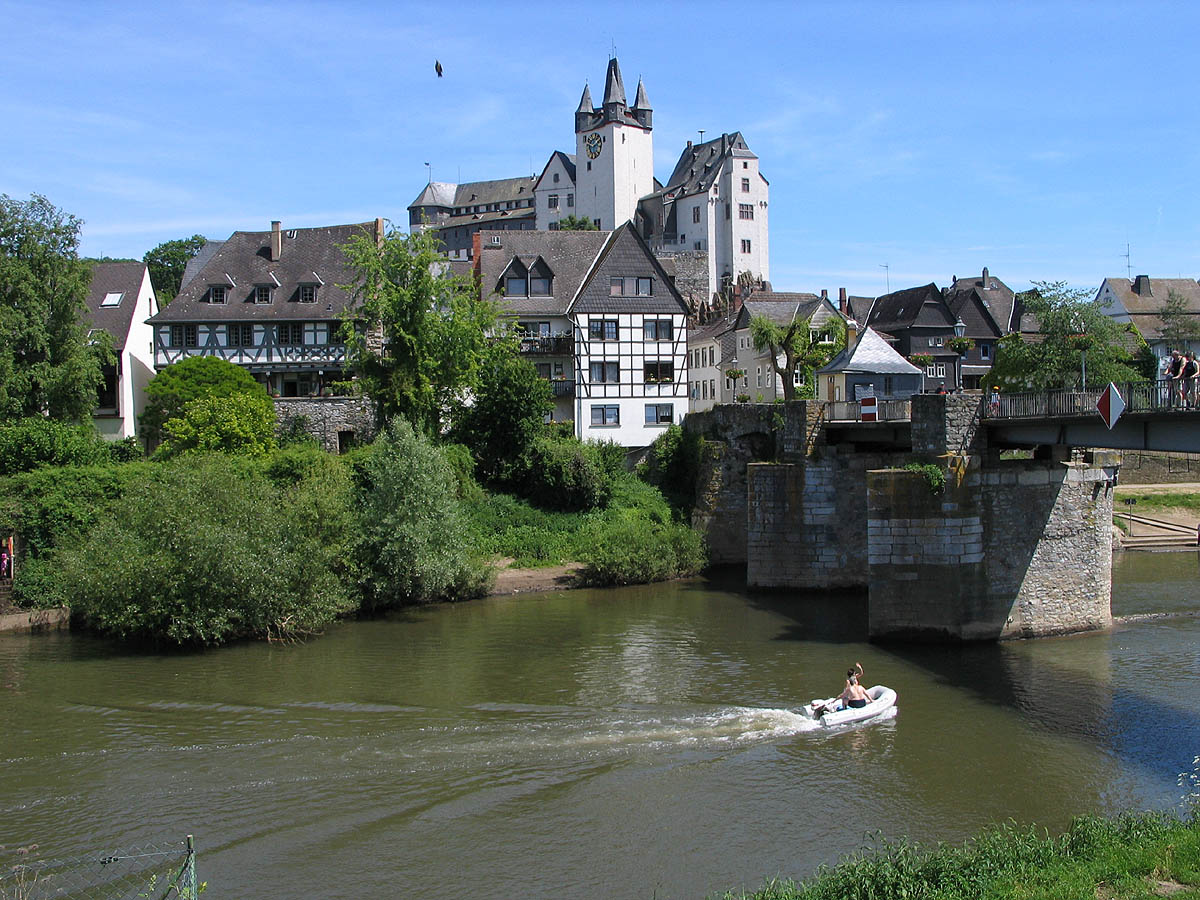
- Castle

- Coat of arms

- Location of Diez within Rhein-Lahn-Kreis district
- Interactive map of Diez
- Location within Germany Location within Rhineland-Palatinate
- Coordinates: 50°22′15″N 8°0′57″E
- Country: Germany
- State: Rhineland-Palatinate
- District: Rhein-Lahn-Kreis
- Municipal assoc.: Diez

Government
  - Mayor (2019–24): Annette Wick (SPD)

Area
  - Total: 12.41 km^{2} (4.79 sq mi)
- Elevation: 110 m (360 ft)

Population (2025-12-31)
  - Total: 11,445
  - Density: 922.2/km^{2} (2,389/sq mi)
- Time zone: UTC+01:00 (CET)
  - Summer (DST): UTC+02:00 (CEST)
- Postal codes: 65582
- Dialling codes: 06432
- Vehicle registration: EMS, DIZ, GOH
- Website: www.stadt-diez.de

Diez (German pronunciation: [diːts]) is a town in Germany's Rhein-Lahn district in Rhineland-Palatinate, on the borders of Hesse. Diez is the administrative seat of the municipality of Diez.

Sitting on the confluence of the Lahn and Aar rivers, the town and the area have been inhabited by humans since the Stone Age. The old town is dominated by an eleventh-century castle, now a youth hostel and museum. It is the ancestral home of the House of Nassau-Dietz, which in 1815 became the Dutch royal family.

== Geography ==
=== Geographical Location ===
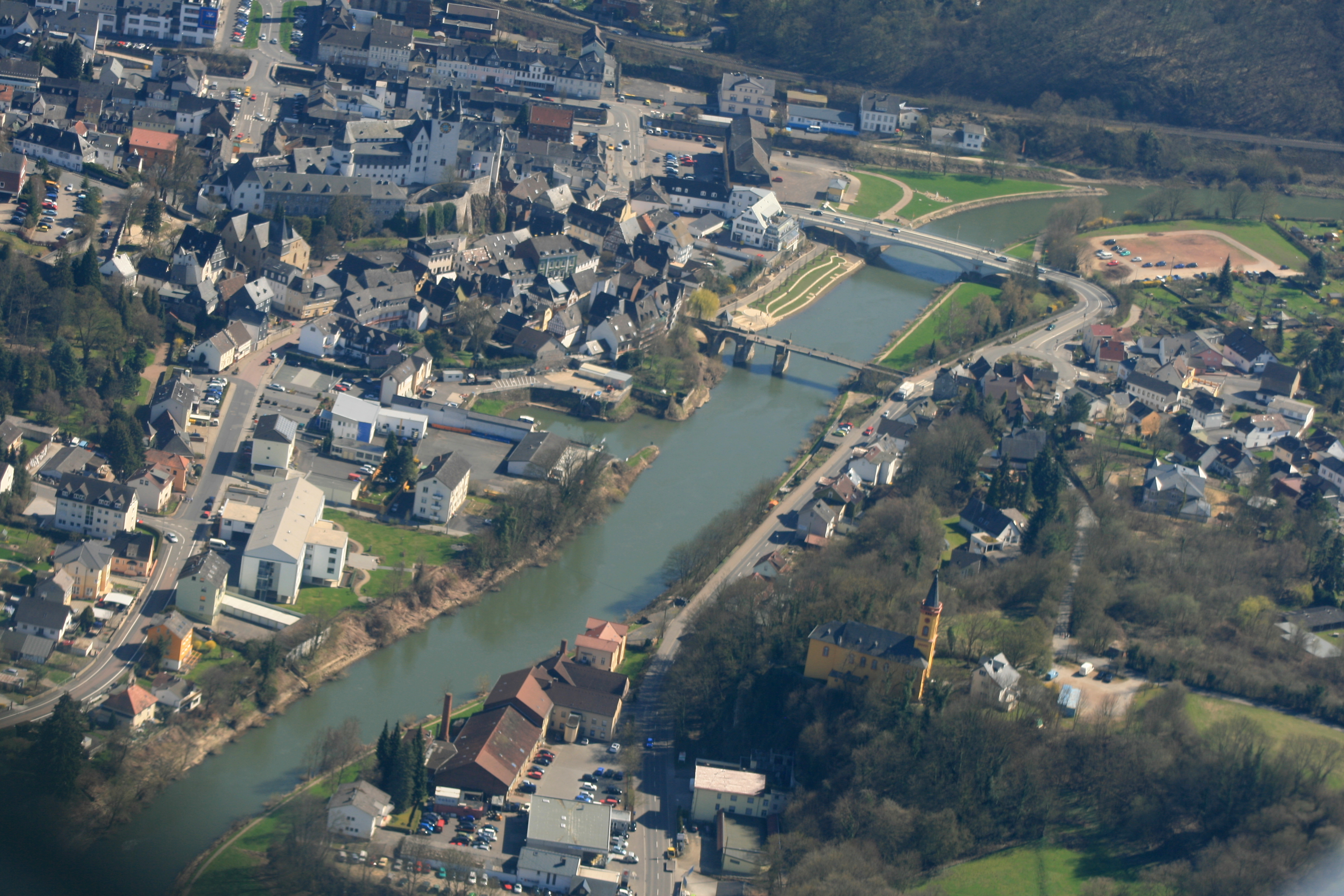
Historic city center with old (front) and new Lahn Bridge and Lock (upper left)

The center of Diez is located four miles southwest of Limburg an der Lahn and 31 miles east of Koblenz. Diez, in Rheinland-Pfalz, and the adjoining city of Limburg, in the state of Hessen, are so close that in modern times they have increasingly merged into a single urban area, although they remain historically and politically distinct. The low rolling hills around Diez form part of the Rhenish Slate Mountains. The Lahn Valley serves as the boundary between the highlands north of the Westerwald with the forest of Taunus rising to the south. This valley, the Diezer gate, begins in the Limburg Lahn basin and rises towards Fachingen in the Lower Lahntal.

=== Geology ===
The soils in the region Diez mainly belong to the brown or Luvisols. Diez itself is in a low area and traditionally has less snow than the surrounding uplands.

== Prehistory ==
The first evidence of human settlement in the Diez area dates from the Stone Age (v. 20000-12000 BC), as demonstrated by discoveries in the caves of Wildweiberlei (between Diez and Altendiez). Other prehistoric evidence includes burial mounds and pottery finds of Latène which would seem to indicate primitive cultures present during the Celtic period. The fertility of the Diez valley and its location at the confluence of the Lahn and the Aar clearly made it a natural place for primitive peoples to settle.

== Medieval times ==
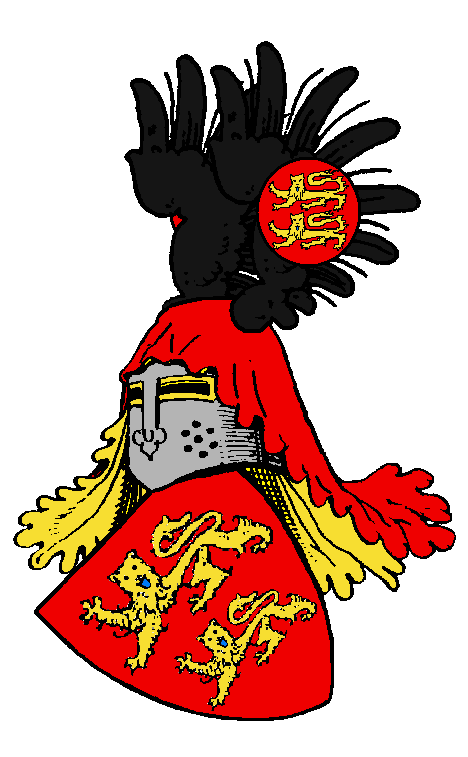
Coat of arms of the House of Diez

The name "Diez" itself seems to be a corruption of the Frankish Theodissa, which evolved to Diedisse, which mutated over time to Dietz and finally to today's spelling of Diez. The settlement was known as Theodissa by the year 790 A.D. according to the charter of Charlemagne where it is listed as property of the Abbey of Prüm. Other early mentions In the post-Carolingian period include a reference to one Diez in the area of Niederlahngau, ruled by the Conradines.

In 1073 that the Count of Die(t)z was mentioned for the first time in a deed of sale for goods in Bodenheim. Early references show that Heinrich II of Diez (1145–1189) accompanied Frederick Barbarossa on his Italian campaign where he was involved in diplomatic negotiations. His son Henry III was part of the regency council and circle of tutors of for Henry VII, which seems to indicate an atmosphere of growing influence for the town. The Graf Gerhard IV (1276–1308) founded in 1289 a collegiate church at the foot of the castle hill. The founding community came from the Abbey of Salz. The monastery was named Saint Mary's after the patron saint of the church. The town continued to prosper. By 1329, Ludwig of Bavaria bestowed the right of municipal law to Diez, and at that time the town was fortified with a wall with five entry gates.

The dynasty of the Counts of Diez ended in 1386 with Gerhard VII. His daughter Jutta of Diez had married Adolf I, Count of Nassau-Siegen in 1384 and inherited the county. Their only daughter, Jutta, married Godfrey VII, Lord of Eppstein-Münzenberg and inherited half of the county while the other half came to Adolf's brothers John II ʻwith the Helmetʼ, John III ʻthe Youngerʼ and Engelbert I of Nassau. The latter's descendants, the counts of Nassau-Siegen, acquired further parts of the Eppstein share in 1530, parts that had come down to the Counts of Katzenelnbogen and, after they died out in 1479, to Landgraf Heinrich III of Hesse. From 1564 on, Diez Castle was solely owned by Nassau-Siegen.

== The modern era ==
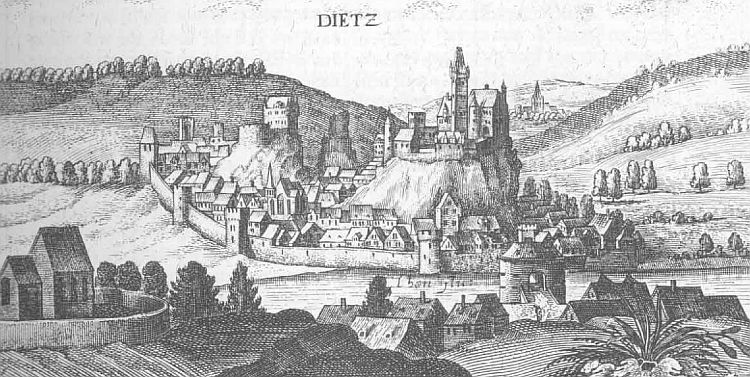
Diez – Extract from the Topographia Hassiae by Matthäus Merian 1655

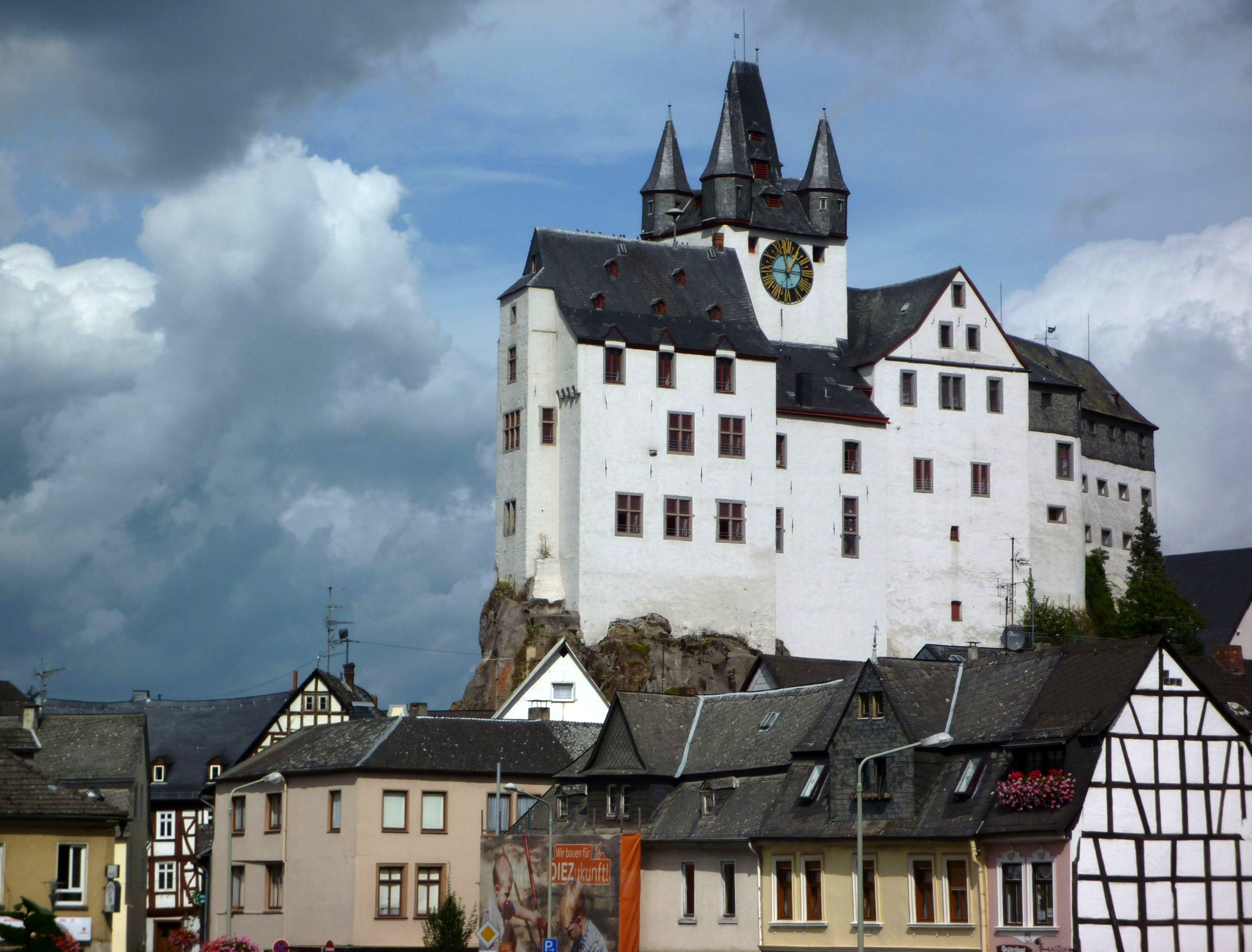
Diez Castle

William I, Count of Nassau-Siegen (1487–1559), called the rich, owned the counties of Nassau-Dillenburg, Nassau-Siegen, Nassau-Diez and Vianden. His eldest son William the Silent inherited the principality of Orange in Southern France from his cousin René of Chalon, as well as from his father the vast properties of the House of Nassau-Dillenburg in the Netherlands, which Engelbert I of Nassau had received by marriage in 1403. William the Silent originally served the Habsburgs as governor of the Spanish Netherlands, but later defected and became the main leader of the Dutch revolt against the Spanish Habsburgs that set off the Eighty Years' War and in 1581 resulted in the formal independence of the United Provinces of which he became the stadtholder. He was the founder of the House of Orange-Nassau.

The early House of Orange-Nassau extinguished in the male line with William III of England (d. 1702), while the later House of Orange-Nassau (and the present Dutch royal family) descend in the male line from William I's younger brother John VI, Count of Nassau-Dillenburg, and subsequently from the latter's fifth son, Count Ernst Casimir of Nassau-Dietz. The Nassau-Dietz branch is also known as the "Friesian branch" because its ruling counts served as stadtholders in Friesland and Groningen at the same time.

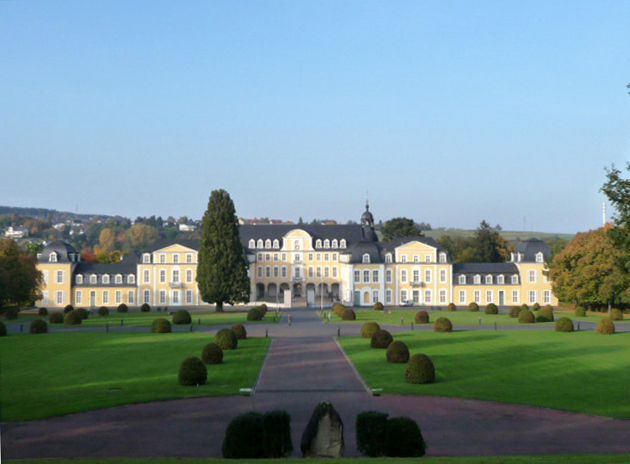
Schloss Oranienstein, Diez

In 1702, the Nassau-Dietz branch followed the House of Orange that had become extinct. The counts of Nassau-Dietz not only descended from William I., the Silent's, brother, but in female line also from himself, as William Frederick, Prince of Nassau-Dietz, had married Countess Albertine Agnes of Nassau, the fifth daughter of Frederick Henry, Prince of Orange in 1652. She had Schloss Oranienstein built from 1672 as her new residence at Diez.

Their grandson Johan Willem Friso (1687–1711) became Stadholder in Friesland and Groningen, and in 1702 became the heir of William III of England and thus the founder of the younger House of Orange-Nassau and of the Dutch royal family. However, he had to split the Dutch properties with the King of Prussia who also descended from William I. Johan Willem Friso's son, William IV, Prince of Orange, inherited a number of Nassau territories besides his paternal Nassau-Dietz, namely Nassau-Hadamar in 1711, Nassau-Siegen in 1734, and Nassau-Dillenburg in 1739. In 1732, Frederick William I of Prussia left him his Dutch properties, including Huis ten Bosch palace and Het Loo Palace. William IV became stadtholder of the Netherlands in 1747 and reunited all of the Dutch and German possessions of his family (except for Nassau-Weilburg) in his hand, styling himself Prince of Orange and Nassau.

The county of Nassau-Diez, like other Nassau territories, was occupied by Napoleonic France in 1795 and in 1806 was annexed by the Duchy of Nassau (ruled by the branch of Nassau-Weilburg) on 16–17 September 1796 as a consequence of the 2nd Coalition war between Austrians and French in the area between Diez and Limburg. By the end of the 18th century the entire west bank of the Rhine went to France and in 1803 a new Principality of Orange was formed from other territories, however only to be divided between the Duchy of Nassau and the Grand Duchy of Berg in 1806. William I of the Netherlands recovered his former counties in 1813, but gave Nassau-Diez, Nassau-Hadamar und Nassau-Dillenburg to Prussia, in exchange with Luxembourg, two years later. Prussia kept only Nassau-Siegen and soon ceded the other counties to the Duchy of Nassau which was however annexed by Prussia, including Diez, after the Austro-Prussian War in 1866, for Nassau's support of Austria.

As a result of the Prussian Administrative Reforms of 1867 the Lahn district was created with the county seat of Diez. It Initially belonged to the lower Lahn Limburg circle. The episcopal city became, however, in 1886 the seat of the newly established district of Limburg. In the course of municipal reform in 1969 Loreley circle the lower Lahn (located in St. Goarshausen) Rhein-Lahn-Kreis merged with the spa town of Bad Ems, which became the country seat. Diez was no longer even a regional administrative capital.

In World War II, 16 young Luxembourgers were executed in 1944 The execution is remembered in a memorial park with a memorial stone for the victims of Nazi tyranny.

A catastrophic flood which crested on 7 February 1984 led to millions of euros in losses in Diez.

== Religions ==
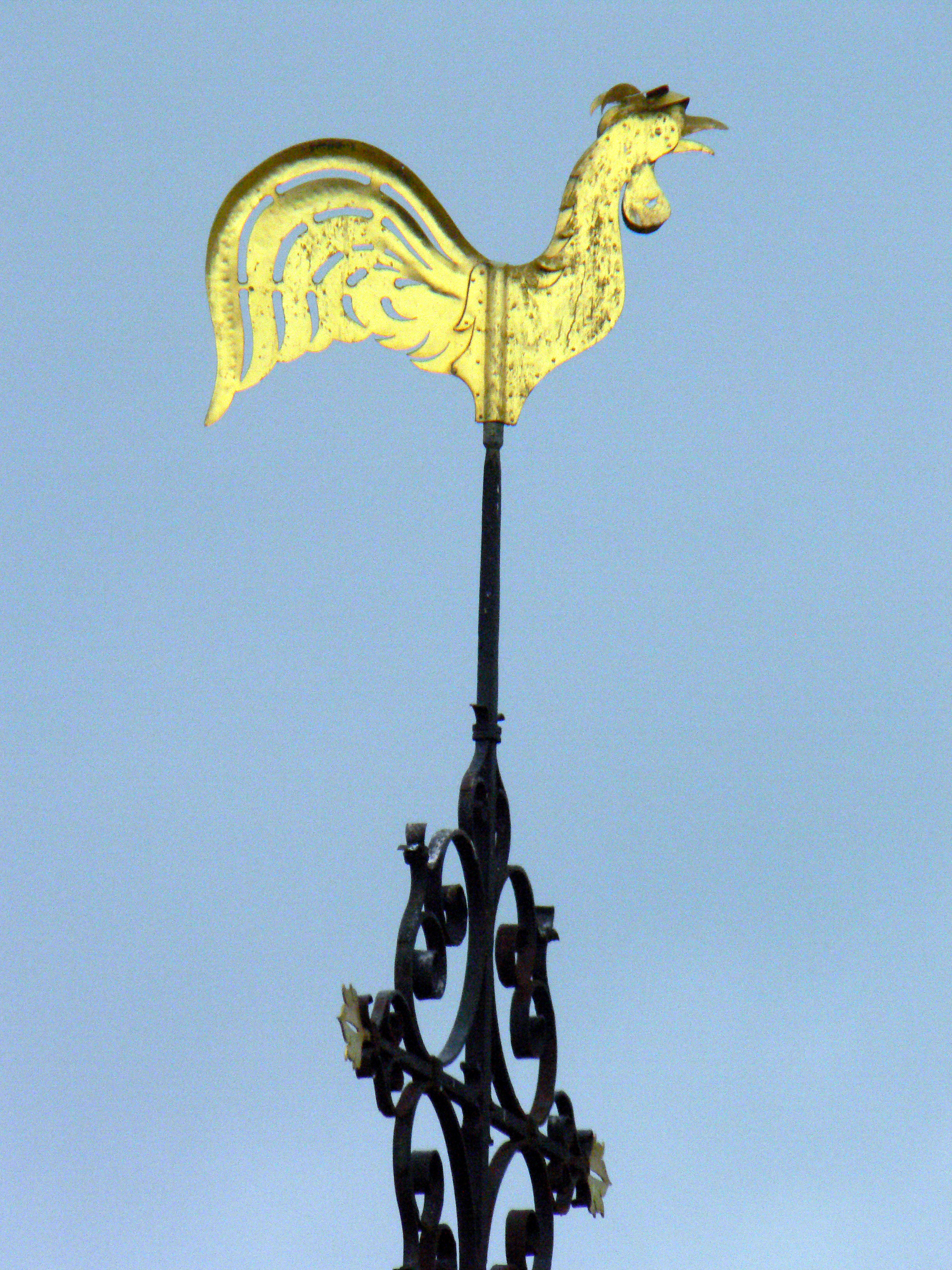
Weathercock on the chapel

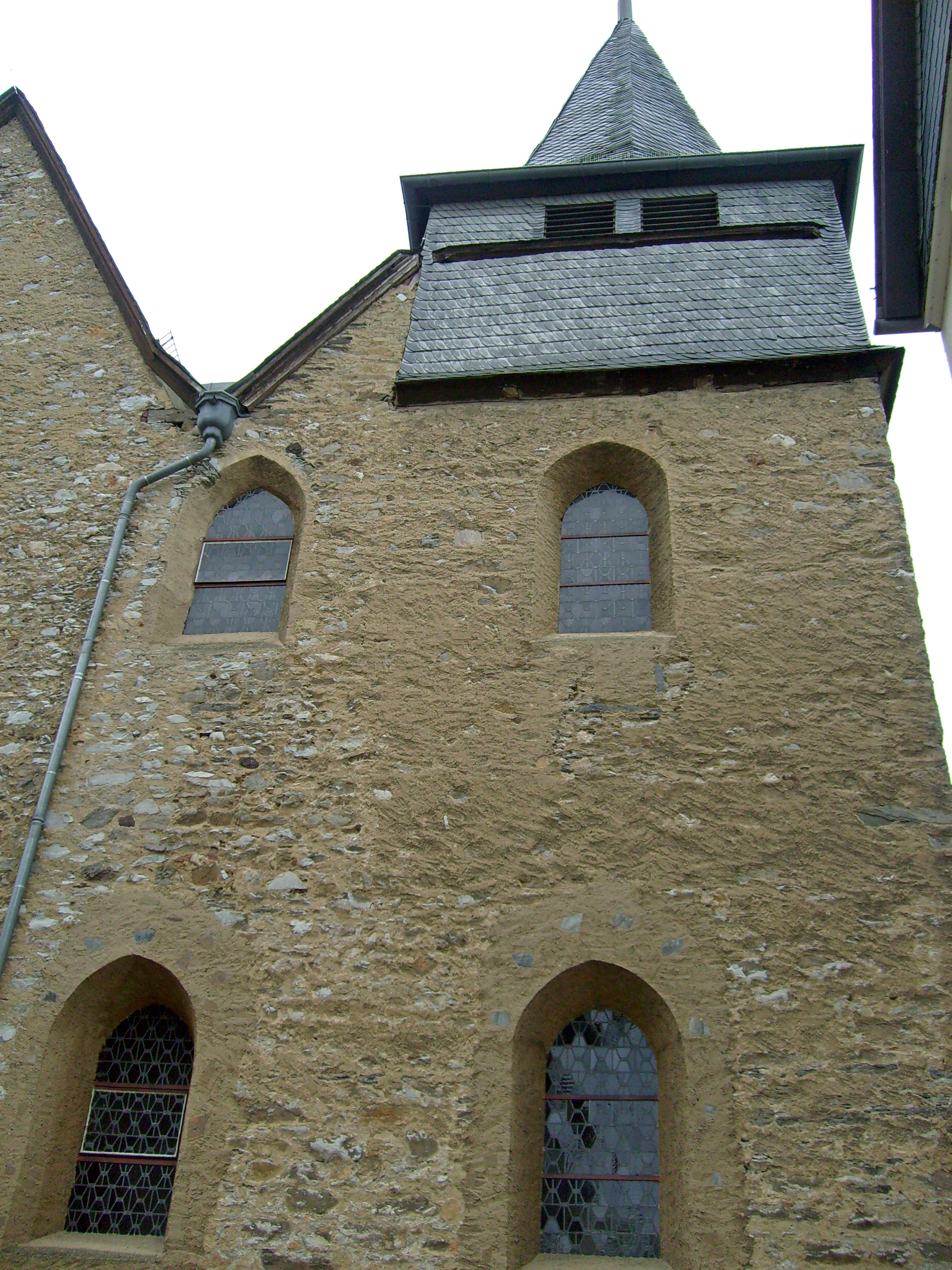
Collegiate Church – Diez

=== Christianity ===
==== Roman Catholic Church ====
The city of Diez, the Roman Catholic parish of the Sacred Heart in Diez and is associated with her to the Pastoral Area Diez, which in turn the district in the diocese of Limburg is incorporated.

==== Evangelical Church (EKHN) ====
On the Protestant side, the main town of Diez collegiate church community and the district of the parish of St. Freiendiez James, each of the dean's office of the provost Diez South Nassau in the Evangelical Church in Hessen and Nassau (ECHN), belong.

=== Judaism ===
Almost nothing remains of the Jewish presence in Diez despite the nearly-seven-hundred year span of continuous Jewish survival in this town, a history virtually obliterated during the Holocaust. The Jewish population of Diez in the Middle Ages can be traced back to around 1286 and 1303. Already, by 1337 and then again in 1348–49, the Jewish population suffered pogroms, giving early evidence of antisemitism in Diez. Nonetheless, a small Jewish population persisted throughout the centuries, although the maximum number of Jewish residents was likely reached in 1895, when 130 Jews resided in the city. Diez was also the seat of the district rabbinate at the end of the 18th century, then the seat of the Rabbi of Nassau-Orange. From 1860, it would be the Jewish community in Diez Rabbinatsbezirk Ems.

Diez hosted a German-Israelite children's home until its closure in 1935. A plaque on the Schlossberg (Castle Hill above the stairs) remembers the expulsion and deportation of Jewish children and their caregiver (s) on 20 August 1935.

Diez's synagogue was desecrated in the November 1938 pogroms, when the interior was destroyed. The building was demolished after the war, in 1951. The Nazis also destroyed Diez's Jewish cemetery (built early 17th century). On this site now sits the tax office. A more recent Jewish Cemetery from the late 19th century survives and continues to overlook Diez from a hill above the town, all that remains of the Jewish history there.

== Politics ==
=== City council ===
Seats in the local council:

Year	SPD	CDU	FDP	FWG	BfD	WGR	Total
2014	8	9	2	6	3	–	28 Seats
2009	7	7	3	6	5	–	28 Seats
2004	7	9	2	3	6	1	28 Seats

- FWG = Freie Wählergruppe Diez-Freiendiez e. V.
- BfD = Bürger für Diez e. V.

=== Sister City ===
Twinned with Diez is the Saxon spa town of Bad Düben.

== Arts and culture ==
=== Structures ===
The dominant feature of the townscape is the high medieval Castle of Diez. The oldest parts of the structure date from the eleventh century. The castle was abandoned as a residence from the mid-1700s, and from 1743 to 1784, the count's castle was used as a Nassau office building. Subsequently, it served as a prison until 1927. During World War II, Diez Castle was commandeered by the German Army to interrogate "prisoners of special interest" captured on the western front, one prisoner being Gertrude Legendre, the female Office of Strategic Services clerk/translator captured in 1944. In the eighteenth and nineteenth centuries, the castle was the site of the largest processing center of Lahn marble. Since June 2006 it has served as a youth hostel and, since 2007, also contains a museum.

Underneath is the medieval castle of the Count's Collegiate Church, built by Count Gerhard in 1289. It was dedicated to Mary, seat of a Monastery. Inside there are several tombs of nobles and the Nassau Diez, among which stands out the intricately crafted tomb of Princess Amalie of Nassau-Diez. Another striking piece is the Roman grave stone. It is older than the church and its origin is unknown.

The city wall, as well as remains of one of the city gates from the fourteenth and fifteenth centuries have also partially survived.

At the northern edge of Diez is the baroque Schloss Oranienstein, the 1684 Princess Albertine Agnes (1634–1696) Ruins of the Benedictine Monastery Dierstein remain below. Princess Albertine Agnes' niece Henriette Amalie of Nassau-Diez, born a Princess of Anhalt-Dessau designed the castle in 1696 as a baroque castle. In 1705 the building was completed.

=== Museums ===
The Museum of Nassau-Orange in Oranienstein castle offers guided tours of the baroque castle rooms for periodic and shows the covers of Diez, of the noble family of Orange, the present Dutch royal house.

The Regional Museum in the Castle of Diez Diez – aspects of the permanent exhibition: Pre-and Early History, History of the Count's castle, town history Diez (from the Middle Ages to the present), Prince gallery.

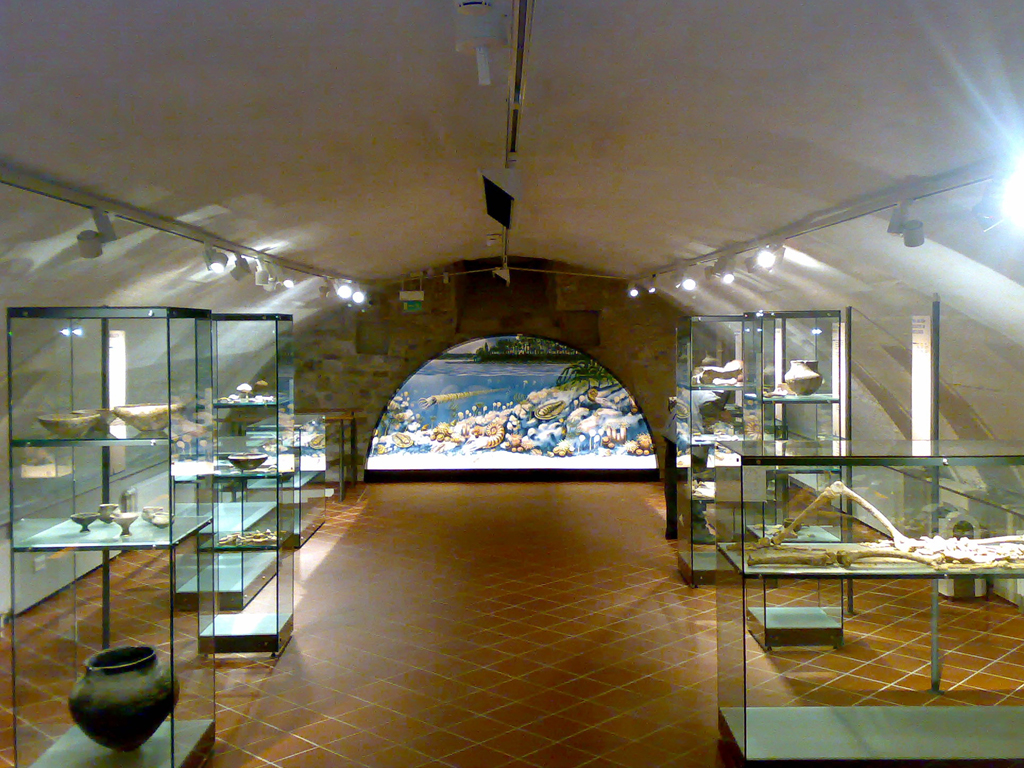
Museum in the Castle of Diez

=== The grove ===
The "grove", known as "the Hain" is Diez's urban forest. The forty hectare site was originally part of the park of Schloss Oranienstein. William V (1748–1806) gave the area to the citizens of the city of Diez. Today, the Hain serves as a recreation area with playgrounds, zipline recreation areas, jogging trails, tennis, and mini golf courses.

=== Music and concerts ===
- Orange Steiner concerts
- Concerts in local Eberhard
- Sacred music
- Choirs, choral music
- Music Clubs
- Kalkwerkfestival

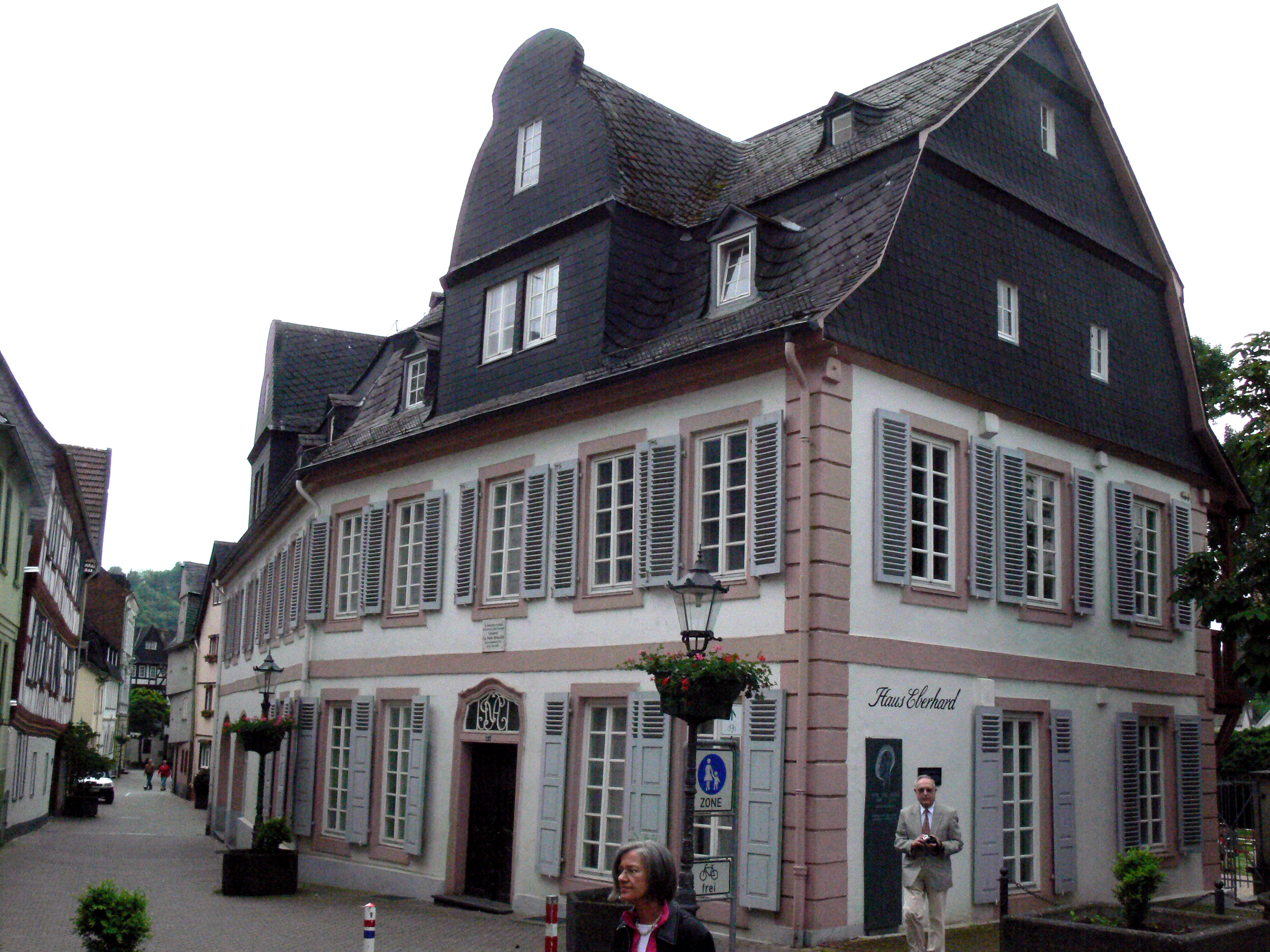
Eberhard house in the Pfaffengasse

=== Visual arts ===
- Workshops in the cultural memory
- Studios in the Wilhelm von Nassau-Park
- Malkreis in house Eberhard
- Exhibitions in local Eberhard

=== Performing arts ===
- So-theater club in the cultural memory
- Theodissabühne
- Theater in Limekiln

=== Cultural centers and venues ===
- Home Eberhard (exhibitions, concerts, readings, festivals and celebrations)
- Cultural memory theater, studios and music practice rooms
- Limekiln (Kalkwerk) with rehearsal rooms, theater group (s), held annually Kalkwerkfestival
- Castle Rock Garden (live music, workshops, readings, parties and celebrations)

=== Festivals, entertainment, traditions ===
- Carnival
- Fair
- Festivals (Old Town Festival, Spring Fair, Martin Market, Grove Festival, Castle bivouac in Oranienstein)

=== Other facilities ===
- City Library (Theodor-Osmer House, Wilhelmstr. 48, opened 19 May 2008)
- Municipal Archives in the house Eberhard

== Economy and infrastructure ==
Diez Bundeswehr site (see above) and has several small industries. Of significance was the limestone and marble industry, but most of the quarries were closed in the seventies.

=== Authorities, institutions, bodies ===
- District Court
- Federal Employment Agency
- Arbeitsgemeinschaft Rhein-Lahn (ARGE) – Job Centre
- Land Registry
- Tax Office
- Community association management
- Prison
- Motor vehicle – Admissions
- TÜV Rheinland Testing Diez
- State Office real estate and construction management (LBB), Freedom Diez
- National Road and Transport Rheinland-Pfalz, streets and office Diez
- Water and Shipping Authority Koblenz, Branch Diez

=== Urban development and city marketing ===
==== Downtown Alliance Diez (BID) ====
Following the example of the North American concept of "Business Improvement District"s Diez in 2006 combined force to revive and redevelop the town's urban core. This process is on-going.

==== Orange Table ====
The initiative group "Orange Table", by Diezer citizens, is a non-industrial concentration to develop the environment of the city and region Diez. This work will take place in six existing working groups that choose to work within their subject area priorities and projects and process.

=== Traffic ===
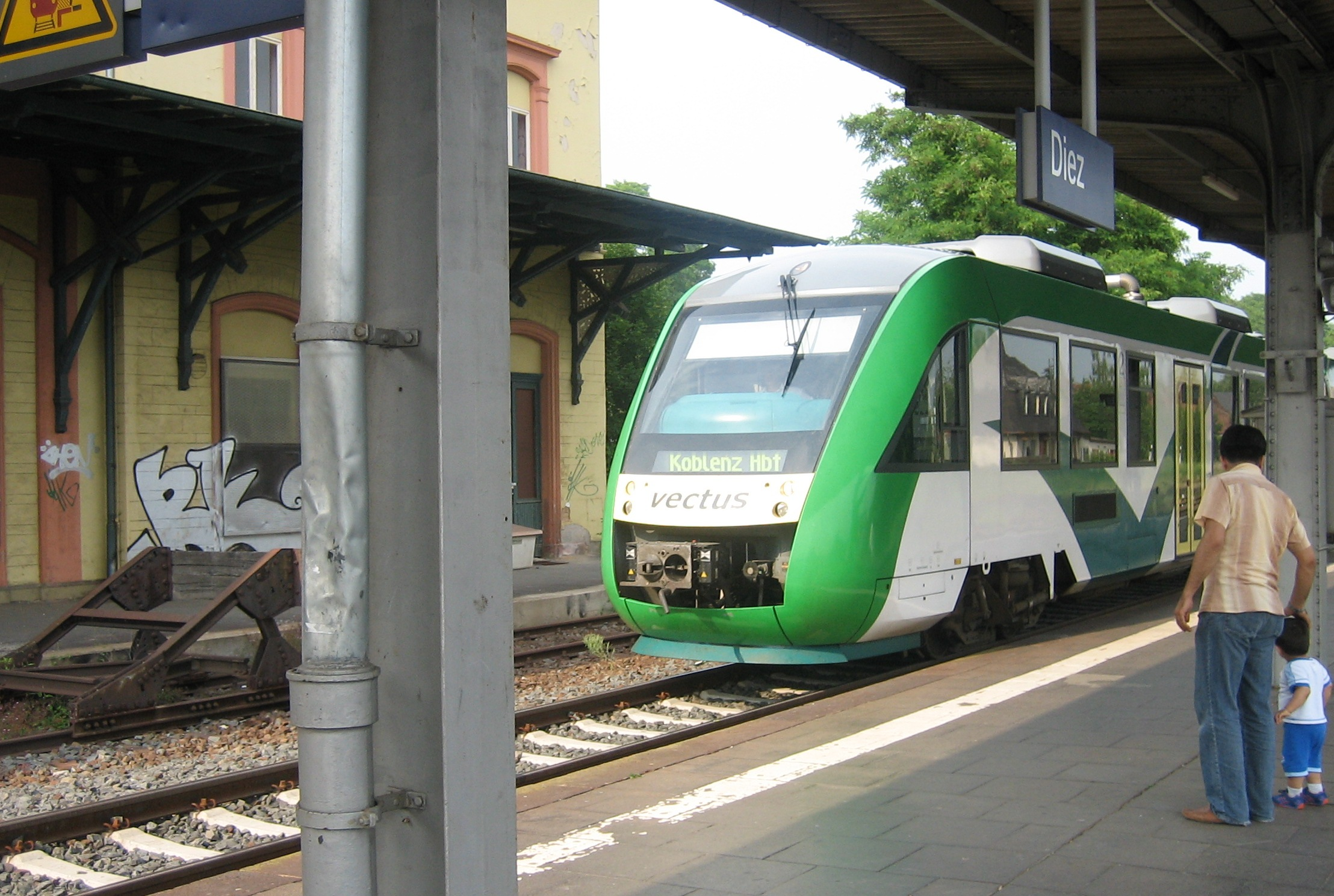
Diez station (Architect: Heinrich Velde) with Vectus Verkehrsgesellschaft service

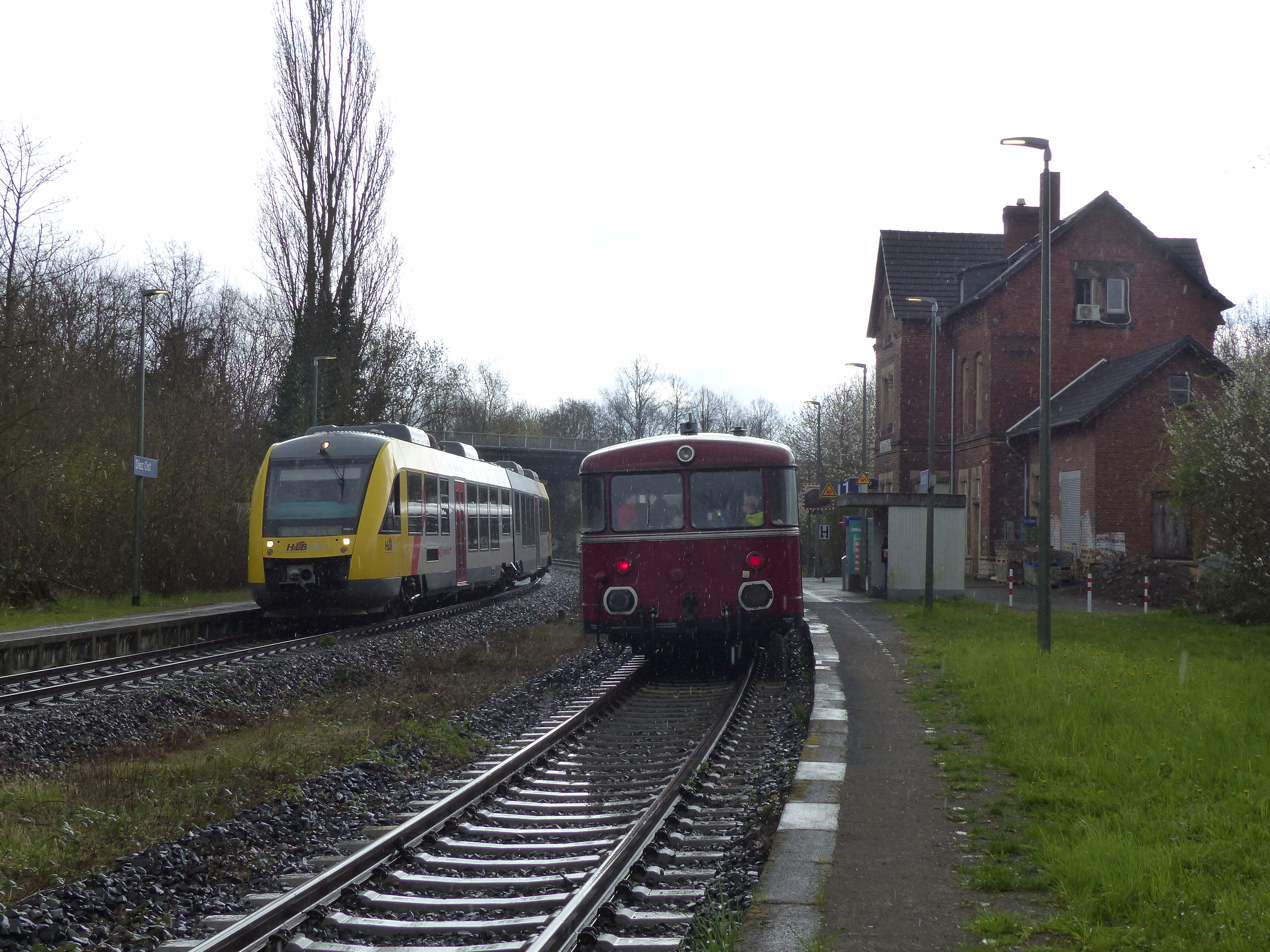
Diez Ost station

The Federal Highway 3 to the exit 41 Diez and highways 54 and 417 are the main arteries serving Diez.

Diez station is on the line between Koblenz-Gießen (the Lahntal railway), served by Deutsche Bahn, company section Lahn-Eifel-Bahn, lines RB23 and RE25.

The Westerwald-Sieg-Railway/RB90, (Limburg – Diez Ost – Westerburg – Hachenburg – Altenkirchen (Westerwald) – Au (Sieg) – Kirchen – Siegen) and the Lower Westerwald Railway/RB29 (Limburg – Diez Ost – Montabaur – Siershahn), served by company section DreiLänderBahn of Hessische Landesbahn (HLB) run through Diez Ost station on the city limits to provide a connection between Limburg rail and the Westerwald and the Sieg.

Diez station has a Bike and ride facility and a Park and ride lot.

The closed Aar Valley Railway ran towards Wiesbaden and is expected to be reactivated to Zollhaus (south of Hahnstätten) in 2015. Nowadays the local bus line 570 runs beside the Aar Valley Railway from Limburg (Lahn) station via Diez and Hahnstätten to Michelbach.

Numerous bus routes in the transport association Verkehrsverbund Rhein-Mosel (VRM), zone number 521, connect Diez with the public local bus transport within the surrounding area, Diez Ost station additionally in the zone number 6001 of the Rhein-Main-Verkehrsverbund (RMV).

The town is a stop on the German-Dutch holiday road the Orange Route, the Lahn Holiday Route and the Rhine Legends Route.

== Education, education, schools ==
=== Kindergartens and nurseries ===
- Catholic kindergarten, Schlesienstrasse
- Protestant kindergarten and day care, Castle Hill
- Protestant Children day care center, cemetery road
- Protestant kindergarten, Bert-Brecht-Str.
- Waldorf Kindergarten, Wilhelm von Nassau-Park

=== Schools ===
- Karl-von-Ibell Elementary School
- Pestallozzi-school, primary school, district Freiendiez
- Secondary Plus Diez
- Sophie-Hedwig High School
- Nicolaus August Otto school (vocational school)
- Waldorf School Diez, comprehensive school and open all-day school
- OPTONIA, School of Optometry and Ophthalmic Optics

=== Educational institutions and adult education ===
- Adult Education and National Education Association e. e.V.

=== Youth Center and Youth Services ===
- Albert-Schweitzer-family work Rhineland-Palatinate/Saarland e. V., Schaumburg St., weekly and group of children Diez
- Youth Centre, Wilhelm von Nassau-Park

== Health and social work ==
=== Hospital and clinic ===
- Hospital of the German Red Cross
- Clinic for Psycho-Traumatology
- Clinic for mother, father and child

=== Rescue and emergency services ===
- Volunteer Fire Diez-Freiendiez
- German Red Cross Ambulance – Diez
- German Red Cross local branch – Diez
- DLRG – Diez / Altendiez
- Malteser Rhein-Lahn

=== Sport and recreation ===
- Indoor "Oranienbad Diez-Limburg"
- Eissporthalle Diez, On Indoor
- Mini Golf Course in the grove
- Lahn-Lama Tours in and around Diez

== Notable residents ==
- Philipp Heinrich Hoen (1576–1649), lawyer, professor and statesman
- Sophia Hedwig of Brunswick-Lüneburg (1592–1642): wife of Count Ernst Casimir Diezer
- Adrian Diel (1756–1839) physician
- Clemens de Lassaulx (1809–1906), forester in the Rhine province, known as the "father of the Eifel forest
- Julius Oppenheimer (1825–1889), revolutionary years of the 1848
- Heinrich Velde (1827–1905), architect, Royal and rail operating supervisor
- Maria Batzer (1877–1965), German writer
- Fritz von Unruh (1885–1970)
- August Jäger (1887–1949), lawyer, judge and Nazi official
- Johannes Petschull (1901–2001), music publisher
- Theo Michaely (1928–2012), mayor from 1974
- Hans Jürgen Rose (b. 1941), television presenter and director ORB
- Bernd Westphal (1944), German diplomat
- Fritz Korbach (b. 1945), German football coach
- Christa Prets (1947), Austrian politician, member of the EU Parliament
- Markus Wingenbach (born 1978) German football referee
- Roman Weidenfeller (b. 1980), German football player
- Svenja Spriestersbach (born 1981), German handball player
- Michael Stahl (born 1987), German football player

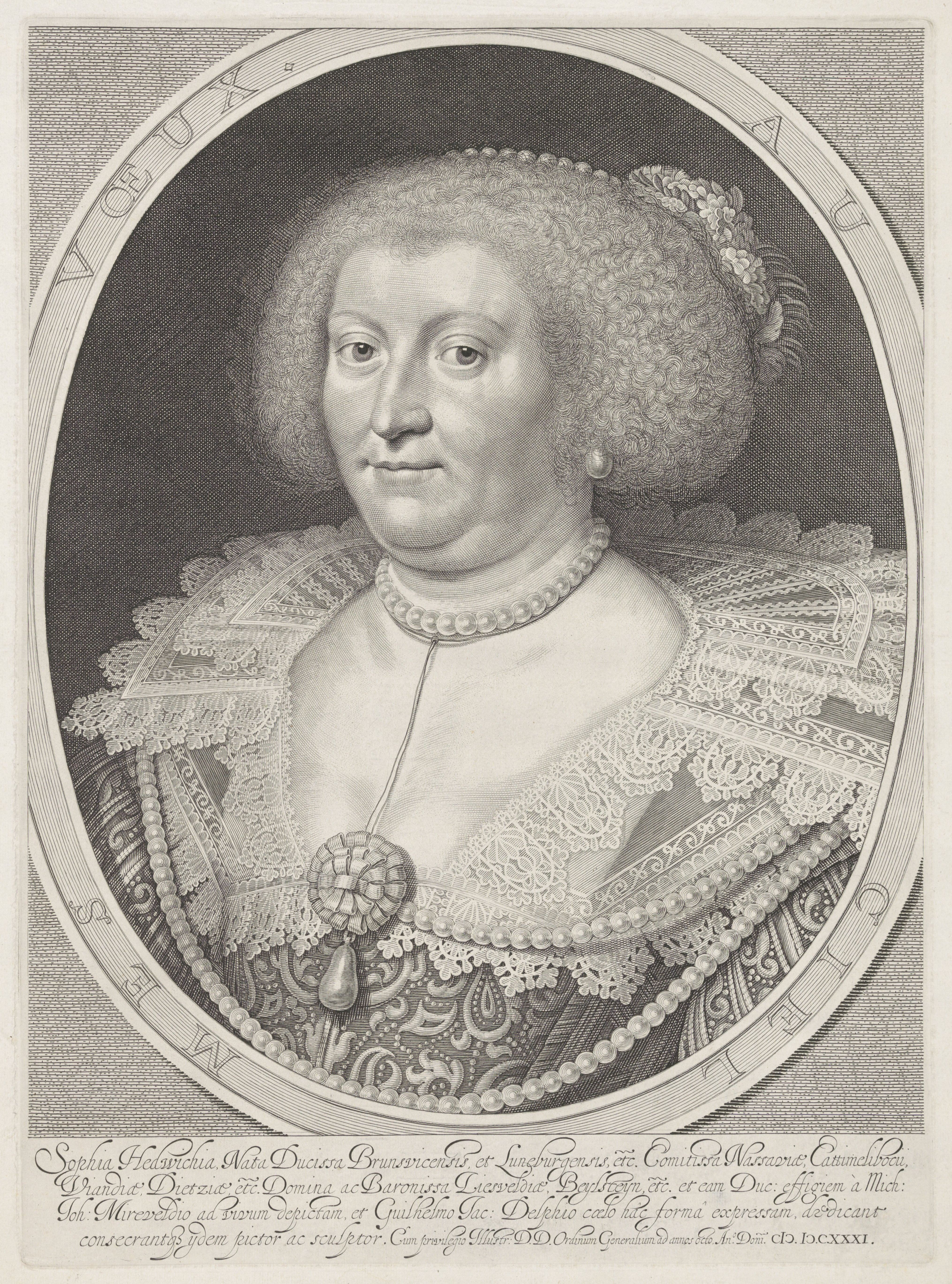
Sophia Hedwig of Brunswick-Lüneburg

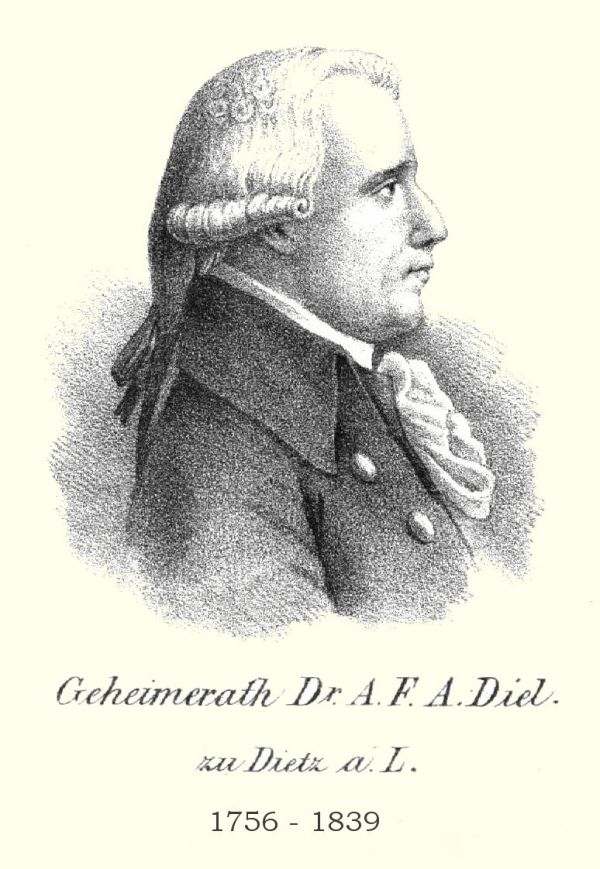
Adrian Diel
