= Sophie Hedwig of Brunswick-Wolfenbüttel (1592–1642) =

Countess of Nassau-Dietz (1592–1642)

Sophia Hedwig of Brunswick-Wolfenbüttel
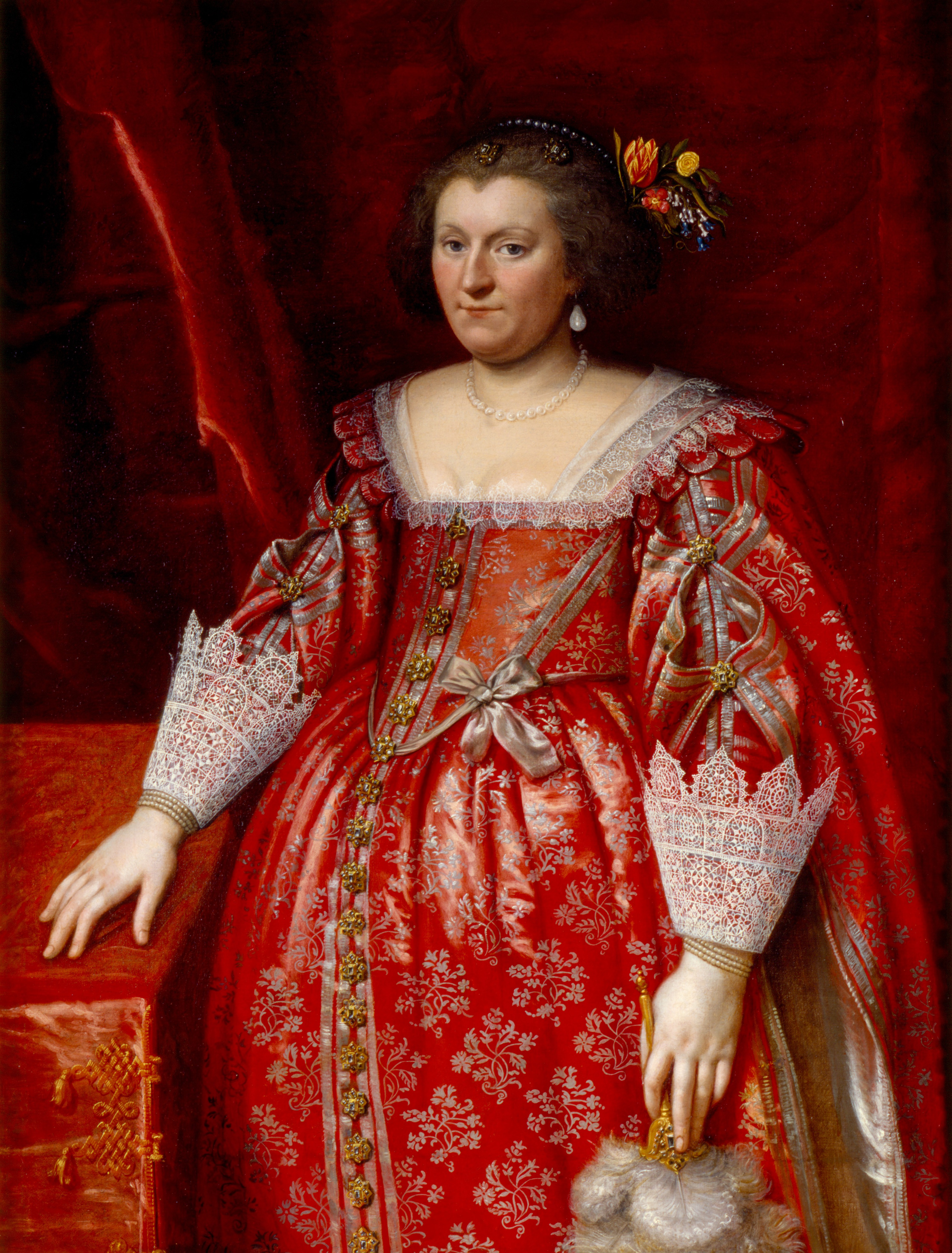
- Portrait c. 1620–29
- Born: 13 June 1592; Wolfenbüttel
- Died: 13 January 1642 (aged 49); Arnhem
- Burial: Grote or Jacobijnerkerk in Leeuwarden
- Spouse: Ernest Casimir, Count of Nassau-Dietz (m. 1607; died 1632)
- Issue Detail: Henry Casimir I, Count of Nassau-Dietz; William Frederick, Prince of Nassau-Dietz; Maurice of Nassau-Dietz; Elizabeth Friso of Nassau Dietz
- House: Welf
- Father: Henry Julius, Duke of Brunswick-Wolfenbüttel
- Mother: Princess Elisabeth of Denmark
- Religion: Calvinist

Sophie Hedwig of Brunswick-Wolfenbüttel (13 June 1592, in Wolfenbüttel – 13 January 1642, in Arnhem), was Countess of Nassau-Dietz by marriage to Ernest Casimir, Count of Nassau-Dietz, and regent of the County of Nassau-Dietz during the absence of her sons between 1632 and 1642.

== Life ==
Sophia was the daughter of Duke Henry Julius of Brunswick-Wolfenbüttel (1564–1613) and his second wife Princess Elisabeth of Denmark (1573–1625), the eldest daughter of King Frederick II of Denmark.

On 8 June 1607, Sophie Hedwig married Count Ernest Casimir of Nassau-Dietz (1573–1632).

=== Regency ===
When she was widowed, Sophia took up residence at widow seat, the Countly Castle at Diez. Nassau-Dietz had been inherited by her eldest son, who was twenty and old enough to rule on his own. He was however appointed governor of Friesland, and appointed his mother as his regent to rule in his absence.

She and managed to minimize damage caused during the Thirty Years' War. She prevented looting and quartering in the city and county during the Thirty Years' War by skillfully negotiating with army commanders. Sophia made a name for herself outside the county when she turned to Axel Oxenstierna in 1633 and demanded compensation for the damage his troops had done to her territory. Domestically, she cared for the rural population and made sure there was a sufficient supply of food and water. When Diez was affected by a plague epidemic in 1635, she was ready to help.

Sophia was a Calvinist, but this did not prevent her from benefitting from a cooperation with her brother-in-law John Louis of Nassau-Hadamar, who had reverted to Catholicism.

When her eldest son died and was succeeded by her youngest son in 1640, she was confirmed in her position as regent and continued to rule.

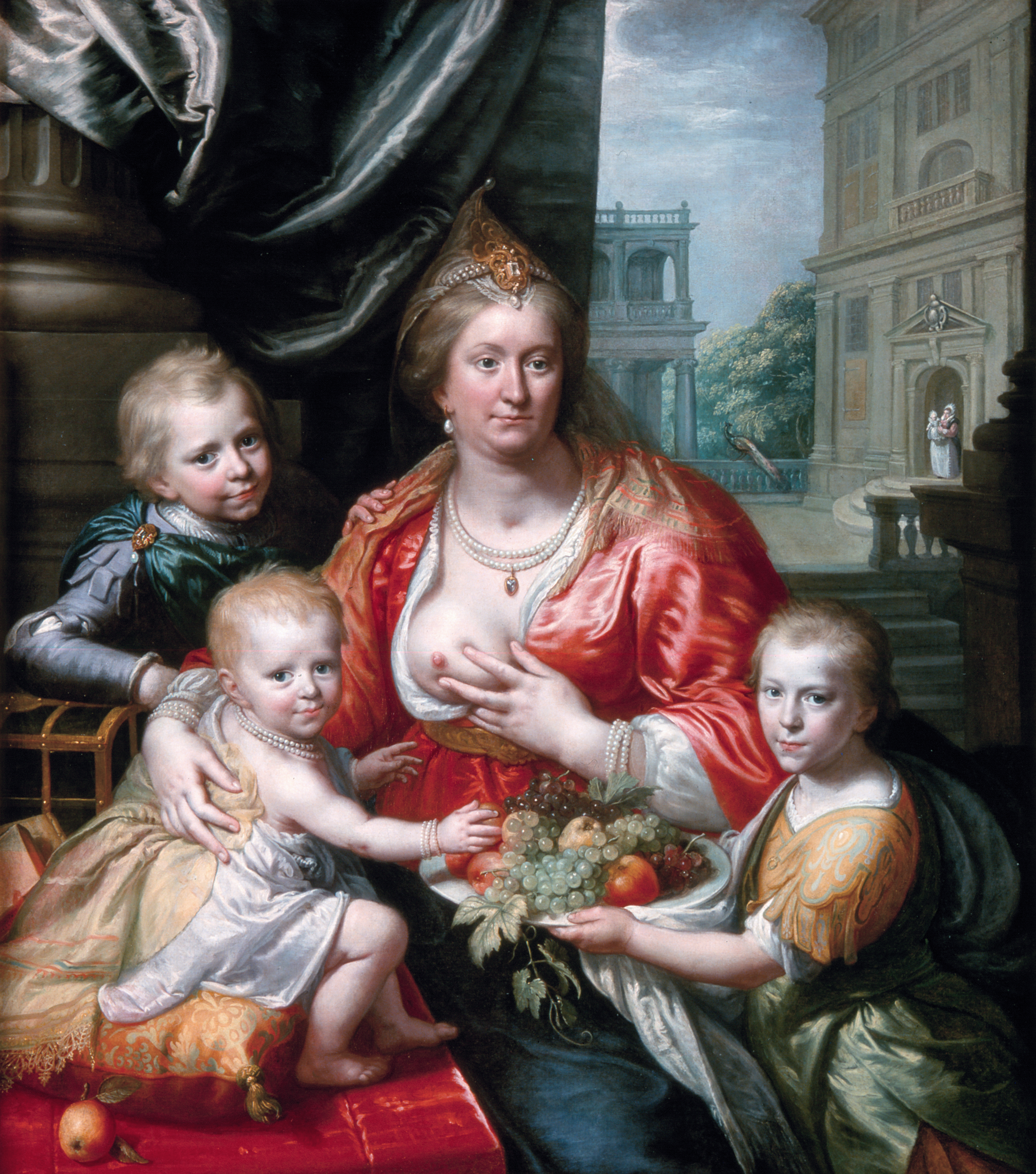
Sophia Hedwig and some of her children, by Paulus Moreelse.

== Issue ==
She and Ernest Casimir had nine children, but two sons survived to adulthood :

- stillborn daughter (1608)
- stillborn son (1609)
- unnamed son (1610)
- Henry Casimir I, Count of Nassau-Dietz (21 January 1612 – 13 July 1640), died unmarried due to wounds in battle during the Siege of Hulst
- William Frederick, Prince of Nassau-Dietz (7 August 1613 – 31 October 1664), married his second cousin, Albertine Agnes of Nassau, daughter of Frederick Henry, Prince of Orange and had issue
- Elisabeth of Nassau Dietz (25 July 1614 - 18 September 1614), died in infancy
- John Ernest of Nassau Dietz (29 March 1617 - May 1617), died in infancy
- Maurice of Nassau Dietz (21 February 1619 - 18 September 1628), died of smallpox
- Elizabeth Friso of Nassau Dietz (25 November 1620 - 20 September 1628) died of smallpox

The English representative at the baptism of Henry Casimir in March 1612 at Arnhem was Sir Edward Cecil. Cecil brought gifts of a cupboard of gilt plate, a diamond necklace with a locket, two horses, and an embroidered petticoat for Sophia Hedwig, who was a niece of Anne of Denmark. The Dutch Republic gave a gift of an annual pension.

== Legacy ==
In the mid-1990s, the gymnasium in Diez was named after her: Sophie-Hedwig-Gymnasium.

A street in Diez was named after her.

== Ancestry ==
Ancestors of Sophie Hedwig of Brunswick-Wolfenbüttel (1592–1642)

8. Henry V, Duke of Brunswick-Lüneburg
4. Julius, Duke of Brunswick-Lüneburg
9. Maria of Württemberg
2. Henry Julius, Duke of Brunswick-Wolfenbüttel
10. Joachim II Hector, Elector of Brandenburg
5. Hedwig of Brandenburg
11. Hedwig Jagiellon
1. Sophie Hedwig of Brunswick-Wolfenbüttel
12. Christian III of Denmark
6. Frederick II of Denmark
13. Dorothea of Saxe-Lauenburg
3. Elizabeth of Denmark
14. Ulrich III of Mecklenburg-Güstrow
7. Sophie of Mecklenburg-Güstrow
15. Elisabeth of Denmark
