= Siege of Hulst (1640) =

1640 siege of Hulst by the Dutch Republic against Spain

- Part of the Eighty Years' War
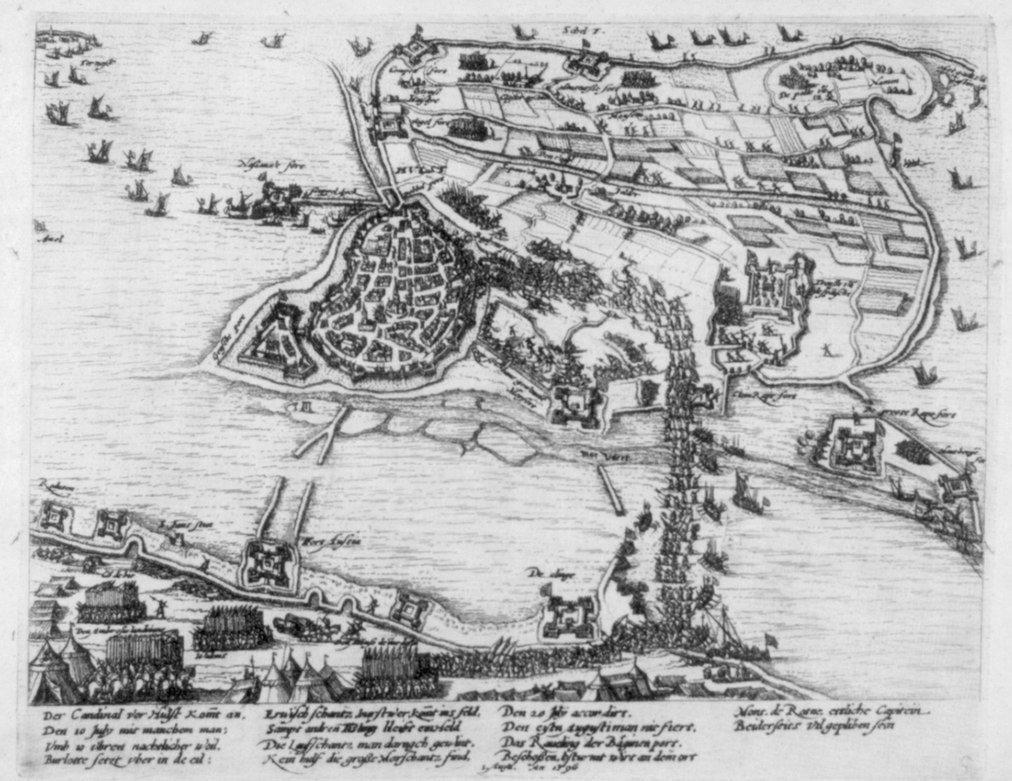
Date	1–9 July 1640
Location	Hulst (present-day the Netherlands)
Result	Spanish victory

Belligerents
Spain	Dutch Republic

Commanders and leaders
(Spain) Cardinal-Infante Ferdinand	(Dutch Republic) Frederick Henry (Dutch Republic) Henry Casimir I †

Strength
Unknown	Unknown

Casualties and losses
Minor	Heavy

The siege of Hulst (1640) was a siege battle that took place during the Eighty Years' War. A Dutch army under Frederick Henry of Orange would attempt to capture the city of Hulst to achieve a better strategic position to threaten Antwerp. The Spanish army, a contingent of the Army of Flanders, having successfully defended the front in 1639, would yet again be set on the defensive as the Cardinal-Infante Ferdinand would build up the Spanish defenses in preparation for a Dutch campaign. On the offset of the offensive, the army under Frederick Henry would begin landing as Hulst would be rapidly invested by Dutch forces.

== Background ==
In the years prior to this siege, Frederick Henry and the Dutch armies of Zeeland suffered disastrous defeats at the hands of the Spanish under the Cardinal-Infante Ferdinand during Frederick Henry's 1638 campaign. Most notably, the Dutch army under William of Nassau-Siegen would be so thoroughly destroyed at the Battle of Kallo that 30 extra infantry companies had to be raised from various garrisons by Frederick Henry to replace the heavy losses, and above all, they weren't able to conduct notable military operations until 1640. This debilitated the Dutch armies in Zeeland to a great extent up until the resumption of operations in 1640. Prior to that, skirmishes by the Dutch across the front had been repelled by the Spanish, and attempts to attack Hulst in 1639 resounded in failure. The Cardinal-Infante since then has been able to consolidate his armies' position in the Spanish Netherlands effectively, bolstering local superiority and securing a strong strategical position. Frederick Henry knew he had to gain a firm footing in Flanders in order to threaten Antwerp, which led to the campaign of 1640.

== Frederick Henry's Attack ==
In the summer of 1640, Frederick Henry would coordinate a joint offensive with the French to bring down the Spanish Netherlands. Frederick Henry would conduct a new campaign in Flanders targeting Hulst to establish a strong foothold in the province and eventually target Antwerp while the French would lay siege on Arras. On the 1st of July, operations would begin as the Dutch army started to invest in Hulst. The Cardinal-Infante Ferdinand would not leave the Dutch offensive unchecked and rapidly reacted by redeploying Spanish troops from Antwerp to Hulst. The first obstacle for the Dutch army was Fort Nassaro. Both sides were already engaged at the fort on the first day, and by the second day, the Dutch only increased the pressure on the Spanish troops when artillery barges began firing. The Cardinal-Infante would embrace a more offensive strategy in the upcoming days, aiming to rapidly repulse the Dutch forces so that resources could be diverted south against the French. After several heated artillery duels and skirmishes around Fort Nassaro, the Spanish would conduct counter-attacks as the Cardinal-Infante gave orders for large-scale sorties against their Dutch counterparts. In Spanish these attacks are called encamisadas as the soldiers would wear white shirts to distinguish themselves from the enemies at night. These sortie-type attacks were used to great effect by the Spanish throughout the 16th and 17th centuries. Multiple days of constant combat at Fort Nassaro ended up draining much of the Dutch momentum and the campaign didn't seem to have much success in its way. The Spanish defenders were so stout in the several days of investment that Frederick Henry would later order a retreat on the 9th of July after fierce fighting around Fort Nassaro.

== Aftermath ==
Fort Nassaro would be heavily damaged but stayed under Spanish control up until 1645. Within the time frame from this siege to the next siege of Hulst, Frederick Henry would spend time reorganizing and planning the next campaign for the next 4 years. Although the Spanish received several years of respite after this siege, the Cardinal-Infante Ferdinand would pass away on the 9th of November, 1641. His future plans would never be realized and the new governor of the Spanish Netherlands, Francisco de Melo, would be appointed. De Melo would use the several years of respite to focus on the French front but would be unsuccessful in the coming years and eventually meet his biggest defeat at Rocroi in 1643.
