= Adrian Diel =

German physician

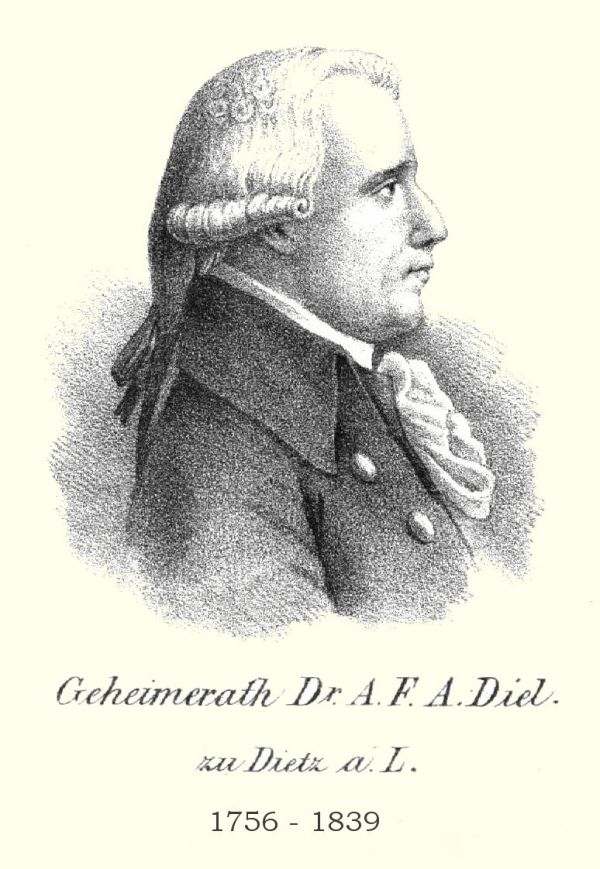
Adrian Diel

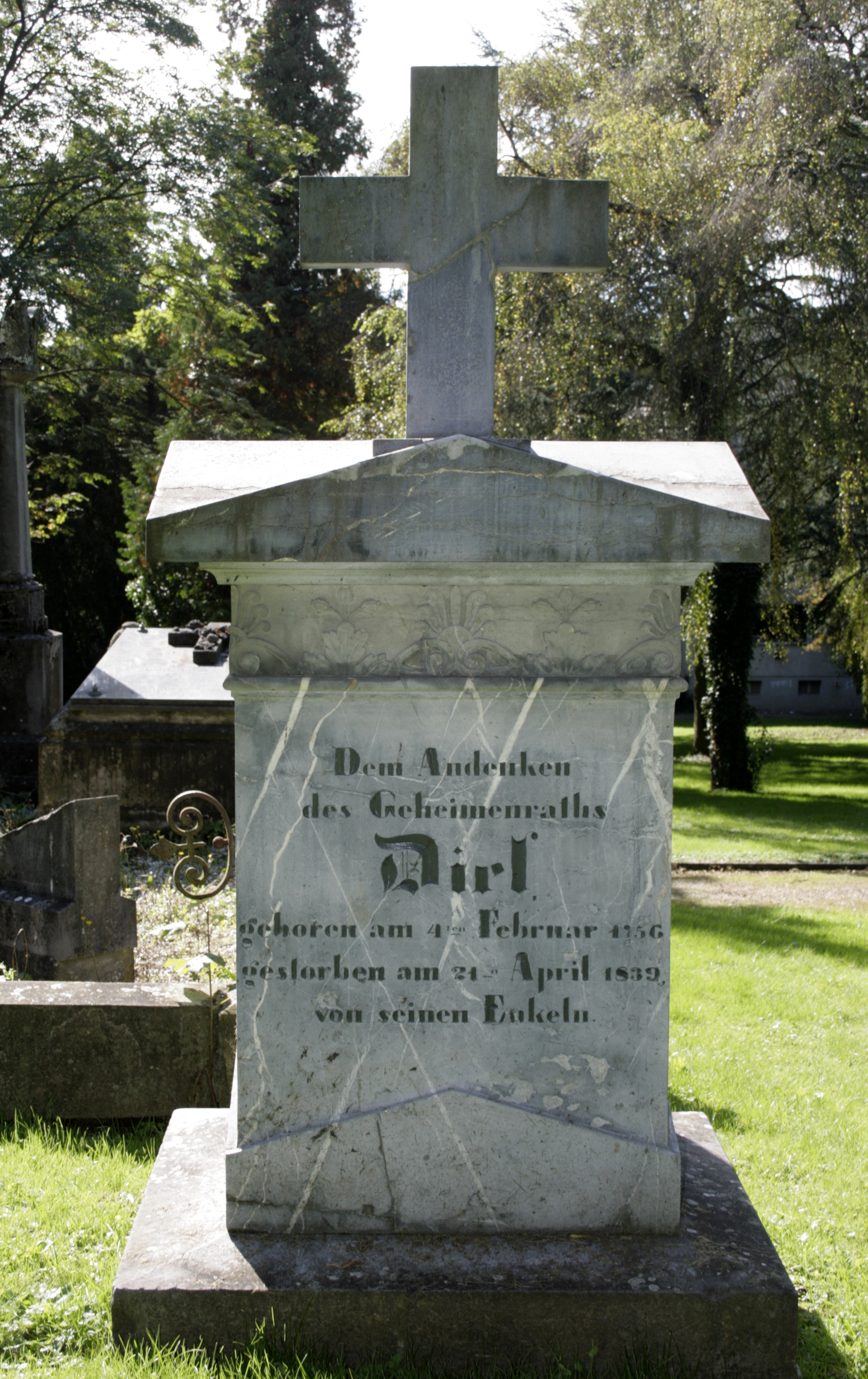
Diel Memorial in the old cemetery of Diez

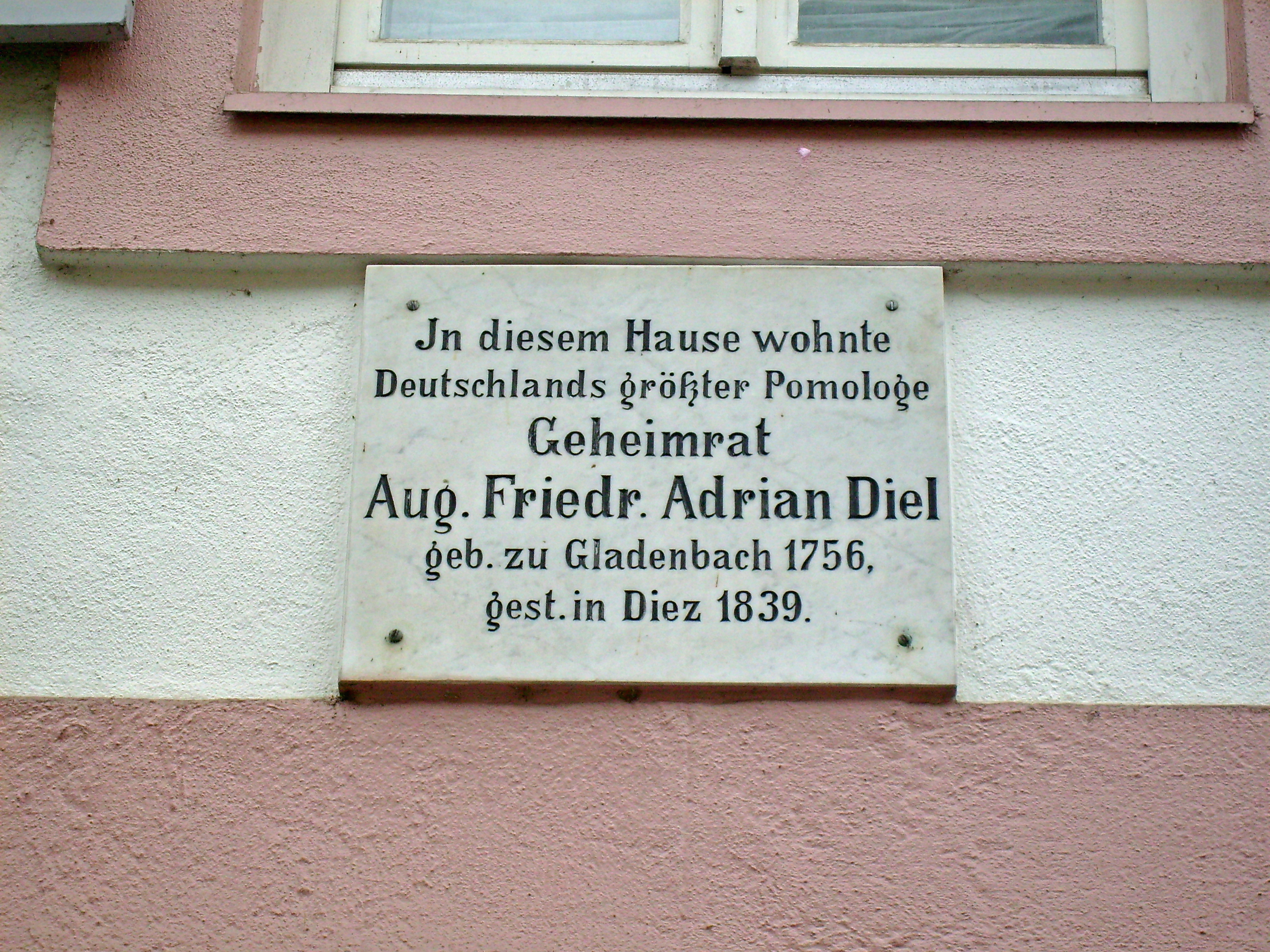
Commemorative plaque for Adrian Diel on the Eberhard House – Pfaffengasse 27 in Diez

August Friedrich Adrian Diel (4 February 1756 – 22 April 1839) was a German medical doctor and founder of pomology at the turn of the 19th century. He also studied spa waters (balneology).

== Life ==
Diel was born at Gladenbach near Giessen. Diel’s father Kaspar Ludwig was a surgeon and apothecary, and a son of the pharmacist Caspar Ludwig Diel. August Friedrich Adrian studied in Giessen (1775–78) and Strasbourg (1778-1780). He earned a Doctorate in Medicine and Surgery in 1780, and became a physician in Gladenbach. In 1782 he became physician for Hesse-Darmstadt and in 1786, Diel served as practitioner of the Count of Spaur, who was Judge at the Imperial Court in Wetzlar, and dealt mainly with Balneology. In 1790 he took over the office of spa doctor in Bad Ems (Nassau) and, at the same time, was the district physician at his residence in Diez. He wrote about the waters of the Ems and its effect on the human body. In the same year, Diel became Aulic Councillor, then Private Councillor of the Duchy of Nassau. He married a native of Diez, Maria Altgelt, but she died soon afterwards. In Diez, in the property known up to this day as "House Eberhard", which his wife had brought into the marriage, Diel planted extensive orchards with reportedly up to 12,000 apple trees.

Diel gained importance as a breeder of fruits and as an author of pomological writings, and laid the basis for the rise of that science in the 19th Century. In addition to his work on the systematics of the fruit trees, Diel also exerted political influence to promote fruit cultivation in the Duchy of Nassau. After the vineyards had been largely destroyed in the immediate area of Diez because of pest infestation, Diel also created large plum orchards. The introduction of cherries at higher elevations in the Lahn area, and the Nassau government regulation on planting fruit trees by the roadsides and on creating orchards in schools goes back to his initiative.

From his marriage in 1787 with Adrietta Dorothea Christine, born Scriba, were born seven children.

In 1925, the city of Diez named a newly created road as Dielstraße. In his native city of Gladenbach there is an Adrian-Diel-Straße.

== Fruits named after Diel ==
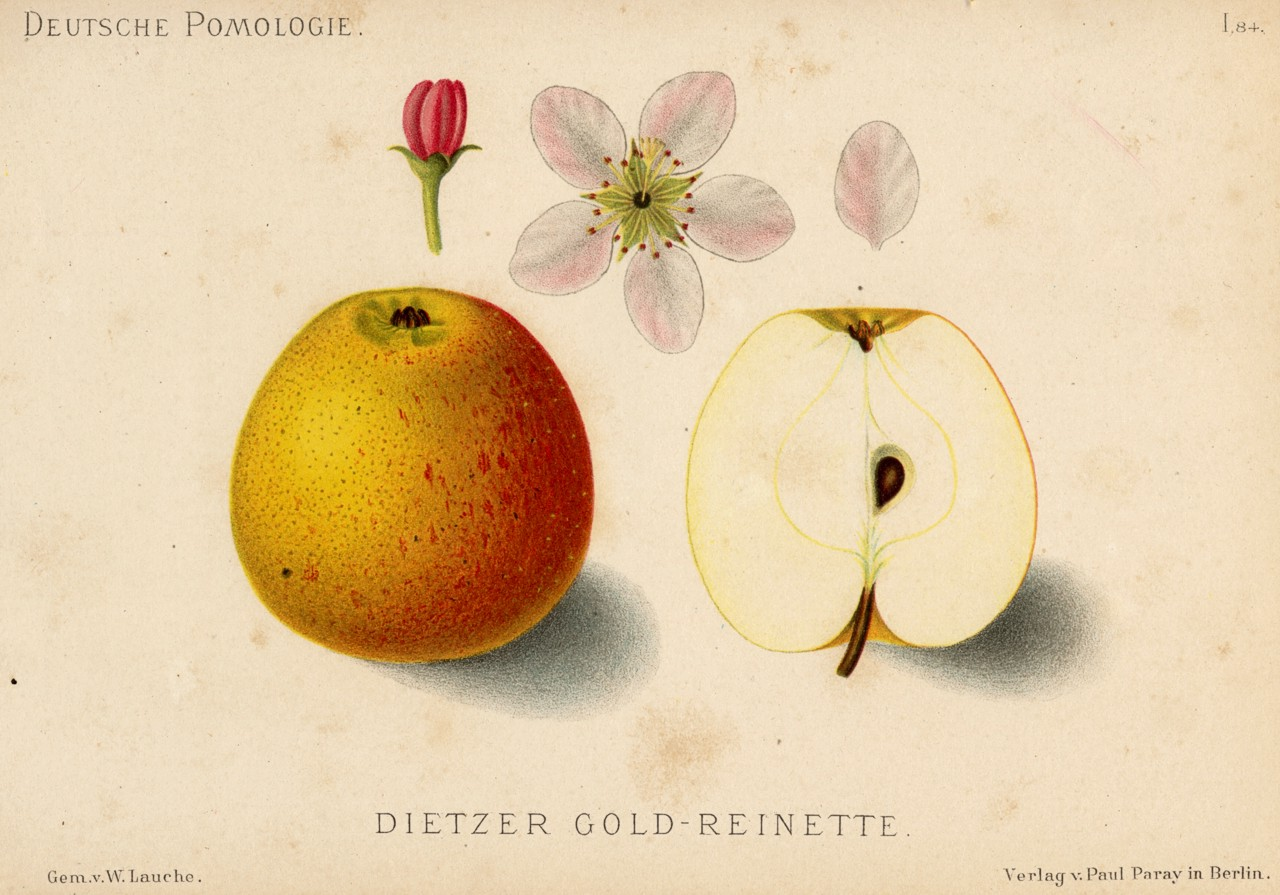
Dietzer Goldreinette cultivar

- Apples: Diels Barceloner Parmäne, Diels große englische Renette, Diels Renette, and Dietzer Goldrenette were well-known apple varieties of the 19th century.
- Pears: Diels Butterbirne

== Works ==
=== Pomology ===
- Anleitung zu einer Obstorangerie in Scherben. 1793; 2nd Edition in 1798 and 3rd Edition in 1804 with the title Ueber die Anlegung einer Obstorangerie in Scherben und die Vegetation der Gewächse.
- Versuch einer systematischen Beschreibung in Deutschland vorhandener Kernobstsorten. 26 volumes, 1799–1832 (Digitized).
- Systematisches Verzeichniß der vorzüglichsten in Deutschland vorhandenen Obstsorten. Frankfurt 1818 with two continuation volumes in 1829 and 1833.

=== Medicine ===
- Ueber den Gebrauch der Thermalbäder in Ems, 1825.
- Ueber den innerlichen Gebrauch der Thermalbäder in Ems, 1832.
- sowie Übersetzungen medizinischer Werke, u. a. der Medicinischen Commentarien einer Gesellschaft der Aerzte in Edinburg in acht Bänden.

== Literature ==
- William Löbe (1877), "Diel, August Friedrich Adrian", Allgemeine Deutsche Biographie (ADB) (in German), 5, Leipzig: Duncker & Humblot, p. 127.
- Albert Henche (1957), "Diel, Adrian", Neue Deutsche Biographie (NDB) (in German), 3, Berlin: Duncker & Humblot, pp. 645–645. Full text online.
- Scheld, Alfred J. (1979). August Friedrich Adrian Diel. Philipps-Universität Marburg. New updated 2011 edition by the author.
