= Stadtholder =

Low Countries governing official, c. 1384–1795

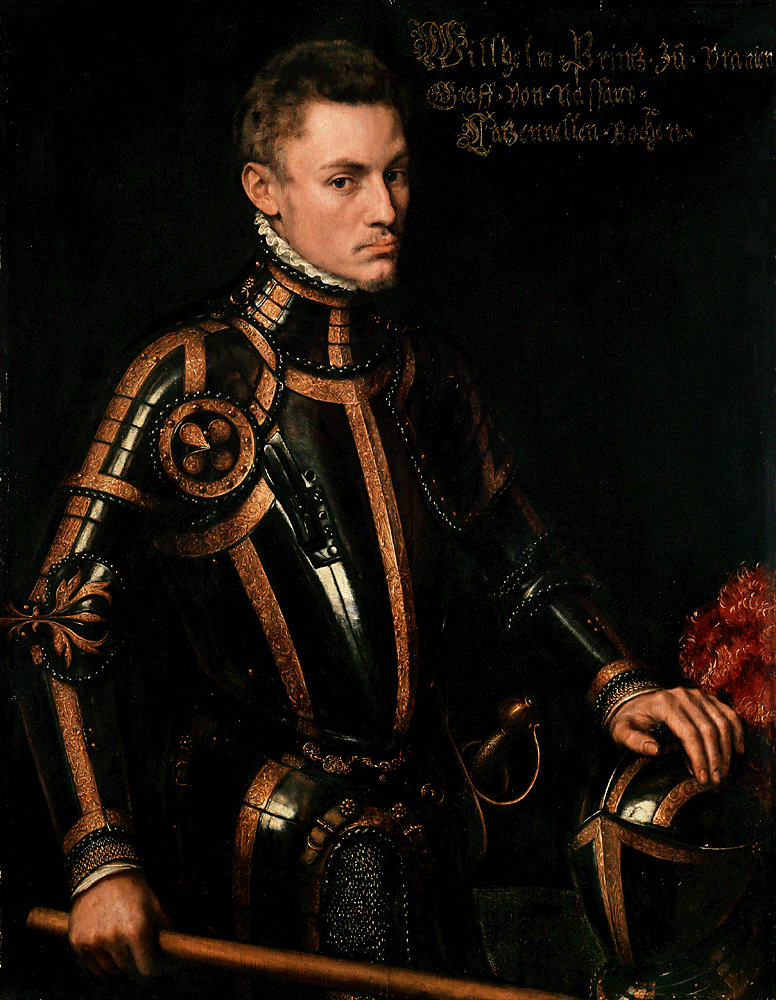
William the Silent was a stadtholder during the Dutch Revolt against the Spanish Empire.

In the Low Countries, a stadtholder (Dutch: stadhouder [ˈstɑtˌɦʌudər], lit. 'stead holder') was a steward, first appointed as a medieval official and ultimately functioning as a provincial and later national leader. The stadtholder was the replacement of the duke or count of a province during the Burgundian and Habsburg period (1384 – 1581/1795).

The title was used for the highest executive official of each province performing several duties, such as appointing lower administrators and maintaining peace and order, in the early Dutch Republic. As multiple provinces appointed the same stadtholder, the stadtholder of the powerful province of Holland at times functioned as the de facto head of state of the Dutch Republic as a whole during the 16th to 18th centuries, in an effectively hereditary role. For the last half century of its existence, it became an officially hereditary title under Prince William IV of Orange. His son, Prince William V, was the last stadtholder of all provinces of the Republic, until fleeing French revolutionary troops in 1795. His son, William I of the Netherlands, in 1815 became the first sovereign king of the United Kingdom of the Netherlands.

The title stadtholder is roughly comparable to the historical titles of Lord Protector in England, Statthalter in the Holy Roman Empire and Governor-General of Norway. In English sources, it is sometimes translated as either "steward", "lieutenant" or even "governor".

== Etymology ==
Stadtholder means "steward". Its component parts literally translate as "place holder," from Latin locum tenens, or as a direct cognate, "stead holder" (in modern Dutch stad means "city", but the older meaning of stad – also stede – was "place", and it is a cognate of English "stead", as "instead of"); it was a term for a "steward" or "lieutenant". However, this is not the word for the military rank of lieutenant, which is luitenant in Dutch.

== History ==
=== Seventeen Provinces ===
Stadtholders in the Middle Ages were appointed by feudal lords to represent them in their absence. If a lord had several dominions (or, being a vassal, fiefs), some of these could be ruled by a permanent stadtholder, to whom was delegated the full authority of the lord. A stadtholder was thus more powerful than a governor, who had only limited authority, but the stadtholder was not a vassal himself, having no title to the land. The local rulers of the independent provinces of the Low Countries (which included the present-day Netherlands, Belgium and Luxembourg) made extensive use of stadtholders, e.g. the Duke of Guelders appointed a stadtholder to represent him in Groningen.

In the 15th century the Dukes of Burgundy acquired most of the Low Countries, and the constituent parts (duchies, counties, lordships) of these Burgundian Netherlands mostly each had their own stadtholder, appointed by the Duke in his capacity of duke, count or lord.

In the 16th century, the Habsburg Holy Roman Emperor Charles V, also King of Spain, who had inherited the Burgundian Netherlands, completed this process by becoming the sole feudal overlord: Lord of the Netherlands. Only the Prince-Bishopric of Liège and two smaller territories (the Imperial Abbey of Stavelot-Malmedy and the Duchy of Bouillon) remained outside his domains. Stadtholders continued to be appointed to represent Charles and King Philip II, his son and successor in Spain and the Low Countries (the electoral Imperial title would be held by his brother Ferdinand I, Holy Roman Emperor and his heirs in the separate Austrian branch of Habsburgs). Due to the centralist and absolutist policies of Philip, the actual power of the stadtholders strongly diminished, compared to the landvoogd (es) or governor-general.

=== Dutch Republic ===
When, in 1581, during the Dutch Revolt, seven of the Dutch provinces declared their independence with the Act of Abjuration, the representative function of the stadtholder became obsolete in the rebellious northern Netherlands – the feudal lord himself having been abolished – but the office nevertheless continued in these provinces who now united themselves into the Republic of the Seven United Netherlands. The United Provinces were struggling to adapt existing feudal concepts and institutions to the new situation and tended to be conservative in this matter, as they had after all rebelled against the king to defend their ancient rights. The stadtholder no longer represented the lord but became the highest executive official, appointed by the States of each province. Although each province could assign its own stadtholder, most stadtholders held appointments from several provinces at the same time. The highest executive and legislative power was normally exerted by the sovereign States of each province, but the stadtholder had some prerogatives, such as being the commander-in-chief of the armed forces. The stadtholder also appointed lower officials and sometimes had the ancient right to affirm the appointment (by co-option) of the members of regent councils or choose burgomasters from a shortlist of candidates. As these councils themselves appointed most members of the States, the stadtholder could very indirectly influence the general policy. In Zeeland, the Princes of Orange, who after the Dutch Revolt most often held the office of stadtholder there, held the dignity of First Noble, and were as such a member of the States of that province, because they held the title of Marquis of Veere and Flushing as one of their patrimonial titles.

On the Republic's central 'confederal' level, the stadtholder of the provinces of Holland and Zeeland was normally also appointed Captain-General of the Dutch States Army and Admiral-General of the confederate fleet, though no stadtholder ever actually commanded a fleet in battle. In the army, he could appoint officers by himself; in the navy only affirm appointments of the five admiralty councils. Legal powers of the stadtholder were thus rather limited, and by law he was a mere official. His real powers, however, were sometimes greater, especially given the martial law atmosphere of the 'permanent' Eighty Years War. Maurice of Orange after 1618 ruled as a military dictator, and William II of Orange attempted the same.

The leader of the Dutch Revolt was William the Silent (William I of Orange); he had been appointed stadtholder in 1572 by the States of the first province to rebel, Holland, as a replacement of the royal stadtholder (He had previously held the post as an appointee of Philip II). His personal influence and reputation was subsequently associated with the office and transferred to members of his house. After his assassination, however, there was a short-lived move to install Robert Dudley, 1st Earl of Leicester as governor-general of Elizabeth I before Maurice in 1590 became stadtholder of five provinces, a position he would hold until his death (his cousin William Louis, Count of Nassau-Dillenburg held the post in the remaining two provinces, Friesland and Groningen).

Tensions nonetheless persisted between Orangists and republicans in the United Provinces, sometimes exploding into direct conflict. Maurice in 1618 and William III from 1672 replaced entire city councils with their partisans to increase their power: the so-called "Changings of the Legislative" (Wetsverzettingen). By intimidation, the stadtholders tried to extend their right of affirmation, while they also attempted to add the remaining stadtholderships like Friesland and Groningen to their other holdings. In reaction, the regents in Holland, Zeeland, Utrecht, Guelders, and Overijssel, after the death of William II in 1650, appointed no stadtholder, and banned his son William from the stadtholdership by an Act of Seclusion, something overcome by popular feeling during the catastrophic events of 1672, the Dutch Year of Disaster (Rampjaar), when the future William III of England was swept to power. After the death of William III in 1702 they again abstained from appointing a stadtholder. These periods are known as the First Stadtholderless Period and the Second Stadtholderless Period.

After the French invasion of 1747, the regents were forced by a popular movement to accept William IV, Prince of Orange, stadtholder of Friesland and Groningen, as stadtholder in the other provinces. On 22 November 1747, the office of stadtholder was made hereditary (erfstadhouder) everywhere (previously only in Friesland). As William (for the first time in the history of the Republic) was stadtholder in all provinces, his function accordingly was restyled Stadhouder-Generaal.

After William IV's death in 1751, his infant son was duly appointed stadtholder under the regency of his mother. The misgovernment of this regency caused much resentment, which issued in 1780 in the Patriot movement, seeking to permanently limit the powers of the stadtholderate. The Patriots first took over many city councils, then the States of the province of Holland, and ultimately raised civil militias to defend their position against Orangist partisans, bringing the country to the brink of civil war. Through Prussian military intervention in 1787, Prince William V of Orange was able to suppress this opposition, and many leaders of the Patriot movement went into exile in France. The stadtholderate was strengthened with the Act of Guarantee (1788).

=== Abolition and transition to sovereign kingdom ===
The exiles returned with French armies in the winter of 1795 and overcame the frozen Dutch Water Line. William V fled to England, and the office of stadtholder was abolished that year, when the French revolutionary forces installed the Batavian Republic. Similarly, while from 1572 in the Southern Netherlands the Habsburg lords continued to appoint provincial stadtholders for the region, this ceased when they were annexed by France in 1794. In 1806, Napoleon established the Kingdom of Holland, putting his younger brother Louis on the throne. He abdicated his throne in 1810 in favour of his son Louis II. He ruled for nine days, until his uncle Napoleon took charge himself, annexing the kingdom to the French Empire, until its fall in 1813.

Soon after the French army withdrew from the Netherlands, William Frederick, the son of William V, was invited by the Triumvirate of 1813 to become the first 'Sovereign Prince'. William had been living in exile in London during the French occupation. On 13 November 1813 he returned to the Netherlands to accept the invitation. On 16 March 1815 he assumed the title of King of the United Kingdom of the Netherlands.

== Timeline of Stadtholders during the Dutch Republic ==
	Stadtholders of the Seven United Netherlands							
	County of Zeeland	County of Holland	Lordship of Utrecht	Duchy of Guelders	Lordship of Overijssel	Lordship of Frisia	Lordship of Groningen	County of Drenthe
1579-1580	William the Silent 1572-1584			Johann VI, Count of Nassau-Dillenburg 1578-1581	George de Lalaing, Count of Rennenberg 1576-1580			
1580-1581	William the Silent 1572-1584			Johann VI, Count of Nassau-Dillenburg 1578-1581	William the Silent 1580-1584			
1581-1583	William the Silent 1572-1584			Willem IV van den Bergh 1581-1583	William the Silent 1580-1584			
1583-1584	William the Silent 1572-1584			None 1583-1584	William the Silent 1580-1584			
1584	None 1584-1585		Joost de Soete 1584	None 1583-1584	William the Silent 1580-1584			
1584-1585	None 1584-1585		Adolf van Nieuwenaar 1584-1589			William Louis, Count of Nassau-Dillenburg 1584-1620		None 1584-1596
1585-1589	Maurice, Prince of Orange 1585-1625		Adolf van Nieuwenaar 1584-1589			William Louis, Count of Nassau-Dillenburg 1584-1620		None 1584-1596
1590-1596	Maurice, Prince of Orange 1585-1625		Maurice, Prince of Orange 1589-1625			William Louis, Count of Nassau-Dillenburg 1584-1620		None 1584-1596
1596-1620	Maurice, Prince of Orange 1585-1625		Maurice, Prince of Orange 1589-1625			William Louis, Count of Nassau-Dillenburg 1584-1620		William Louis, Count of Nassau-Dillenburg 1596-1620
1620-1625	Maurice, Prince of Orange 1585-1625		Maurice, Prince of Orange 1589-1625			Ernest Casimir, Count of Nassau-Dietz 1620-1632	Maurice, Prince of Orange 1620-1625	
1625-1632	Frederick Henry, Prince of Orange 1625-1647					Ernest Casimir, Count of Nassau-Dietz 1620-1632	Ernest Casimir, Count of Nassau-Dietz 1625-1632	
1632-1640	Frederick Henry, Prince of Orange 1625-1647					Henry Casimir I of Nassau-Dietz 1632-1640		
1640-1647	Frederick Henry, Prince of Orange 1625-1647					William Frederick, Prince of Nassau-Dietz 1640-1664	Frederick Henry, Prince of Orange 1640-1647	
1647-1650	William II, Prince of Orange 1647-1650					William Frederick, Prince of Nassau-Dietz 1640-1664	William II, Prince of Orange 1647-1650	
1650-1664	First Stadtholderless Period 1650-1672			First Stadtholderless Period 1650-1675		William Frederick, Prince of Nassau-Dietz 1640-1664	William Frederick, Prince of Nassau-Dietz 1650-1664	
1664-1672	First Stadtholderless Period 1650-1672			First Stadtholderless Period 1650-1675		Henry Casimir II, Prince of Nassau-Dietz 1664-1696		
1672-1675	William III of Orange 1672-1702			First Stadtholderless Period 1650-1675		Henry Casimir II, Prince of Nassau-Dietz 1664-1696		
1675-1696	William III of Orange 1672-1702			William III of Orange 1675-1702		Henry Casimir II, Prince of Nassau-Dietz 1664-1696		
1696-1702	William III of Orange 1672-1702			William III of Orange 1675-1702		John William Friso 1696-1711		William III of Orange 1696-1702
1702-1711	Second Stadtholderless Period 1702-1747			Second Stadtholderless Period 1702-1722	Second Stadtholderless Period 1702-1747	John William Friso 1696-1711		Second Stadtholderless Period 1702-1722
1711-1718	Second Stadtholderless Period 1702-1747			Second Stadtholderless Period 1702-1722	Second Stadtholderless Period 1702-1747	William IV, Prince of Orange 1711-1747	Second Stadtholderless Period 1711-1718	Second Stadtholderless Period 1702-1722
1718-1722	Second Stadtholderless Period 1702-1747			Second Stadtholderless Period 1702-1722	Second Stadtholderless Period 1702-1747	William IV, Prince of Orange 1711-1747	William IV, Prince of Orange 1718-1747	Second Stadtholderless Period 1702-1722
1722-1747	Second Stadtholderless Period 1702-1747			William IV, Prince of Orange 1722-1747	Second Stadtholderless Period 1702-1747	William IV, Prince of Orange 1711-1747	William IV, Prince of Orange 1718-1747	William IV, Prince of Orange 1722-1747
1747-1751	William IV, Prince of Orange 1747-1751							
1751-1795	William V, Prince of Orange 1751-1795							

== As political model ==
The stadtholderate was taken as a political model by the Founding Fathers of the United States with regard to the executive powers – Oliver Ellsworth for example arguing that without its influence in the United Provinces, "their machine of government would no more move than a ship without wind".

== See also ==
- Lord Protector
- Steward (office)
- List of stadtholders in the Low Countries
- List of governors of the Habsburg Netherlands
- Governor-general of Norway
- Orangists
- Dutch monarchy
- List of monarchs of the Netherlands
- King's Commissioner (modern name)
