= William Frederick, Prince of Nassau-Dietz =

William Frederick of Nassau-Dietz
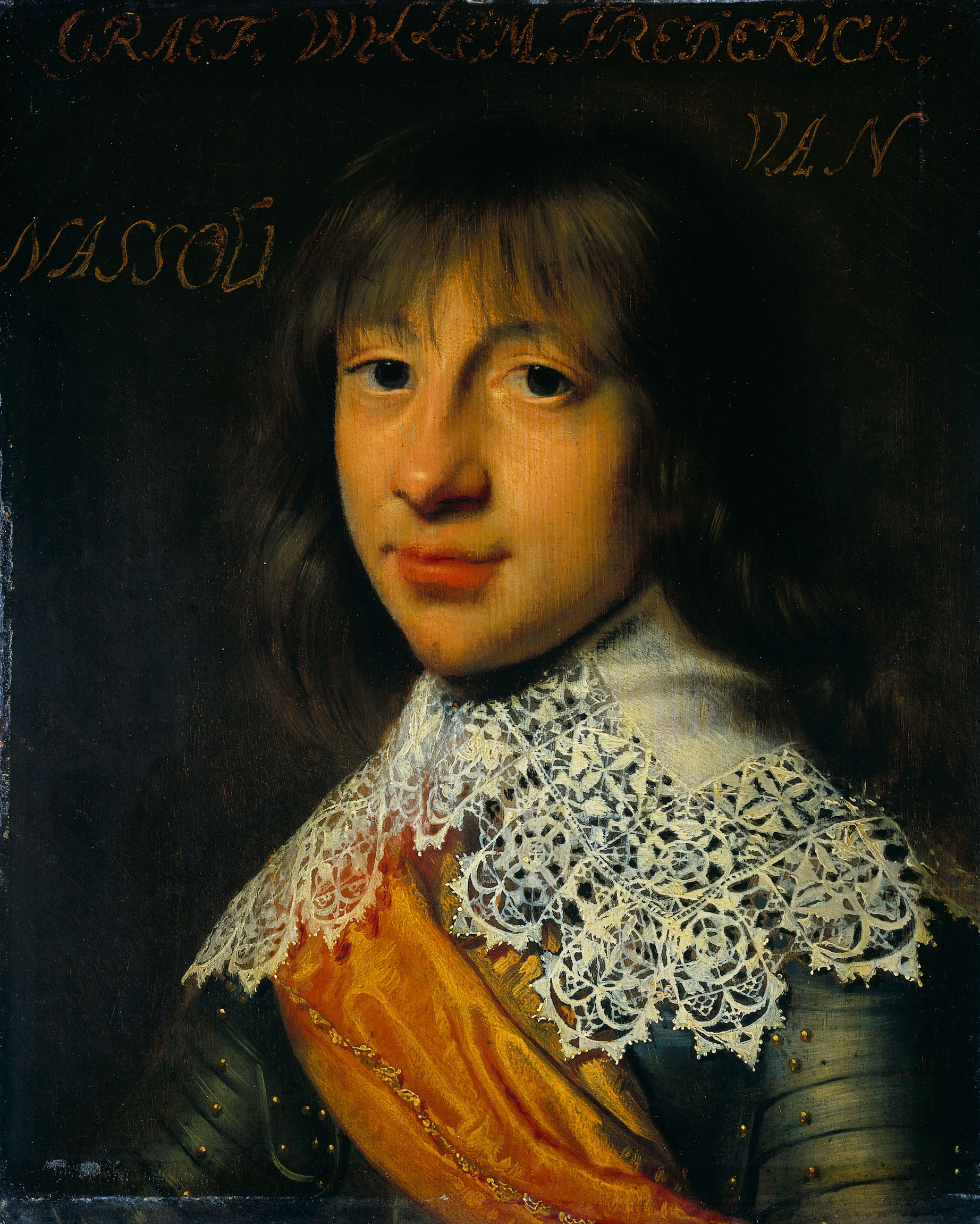
- William Frederick of Nassau-Dietz by Wybrand de Geest, 1632

Prince of Nassau-Dietz
- Reign: 13 July 1640 – 31 October 1664
- Predecessor: Henry Casimir I
- Successor: Henry Casimir II

Stadtholder of Friesland
- Period: 1640-1664
- Predecessor: Henry Casimir I
- Successor: Henry Casimir II

Stadtholder of Groningen and Drenthe
- Period: 1650-1664
- Predecessor: William II
- Successor: Henry Casimir II
- Born: 7 August 1613; Arnhem
- Died: 31 October 1664 (aged 51); Leeuwarden
- Burial: Grote or Jacobijnerkerk in Leeuwarden
- Spouse: Countess Albertine Agnes of Nassau (m. 1652)
- Issue: Amalie, Hereditary Duchess of Nassau-Dietz; Henry Casimir II, Prince of Nassau-Dietz; Wilhelmina Sophia Hedwig
- House: Nassau
- Father: Ernest Casimir, Count of Nassau-Dietz
- Mother: Sophia Hedwig of Brunswick-Lüneburg

William Frederick (Dutch: Willem Frederik; Arnhem 7 August 1613 – Leeuwarden 31 October 1664), was Count (from 1654 Imperial Prince) of Nassau-Dietz, Stadtholder of Friesland, Groningen and Drenthe.

== Biography ==
=== Family life ===
William Frederick was the second son of Ernest Casimir, Count of Nassau-Dietz and Sophia Hedwig of Brunswick-Lüneburg. He married Countess Albertine Agnes of Nassau, the fifth daughter of Frederick Henry, Prince of Orange on 2 May 1652 in Cleves. They had three children:

- Amalie of Nassau-Dietz (1655–1695), married to John William III of Saxe-Eisenach
- Henry Casimir II, Count of Nassau-Dietz (1657–1696), married to Princess Henriëtte Amalia of Anhalt-Dessau
- Wilhelmina Sophia Hedwig (1664–1667)

The fact that his wife was only the fifth daughter of Frederick Henry, and that they were married after the death of her father, would later take on a special significance in the quarrel about the inheritance of the title of Prince of Orange after the death of William III of England in 1702. This was because Frederick Henry had made a provision in his will that if his male line would die out (which was the case with William III) the title of Prince of Orange would be inherited by the male issue of the line of his elder daughter Louise Henriette of Nassau. This might even have been the case without this provision, had William III not himself left the inheritance to the descendants of William Frederick in his will. The inheritance therefore came down to a clash of testaments, with the outcome that both claimants eventually took the title and divided the material inheritance.

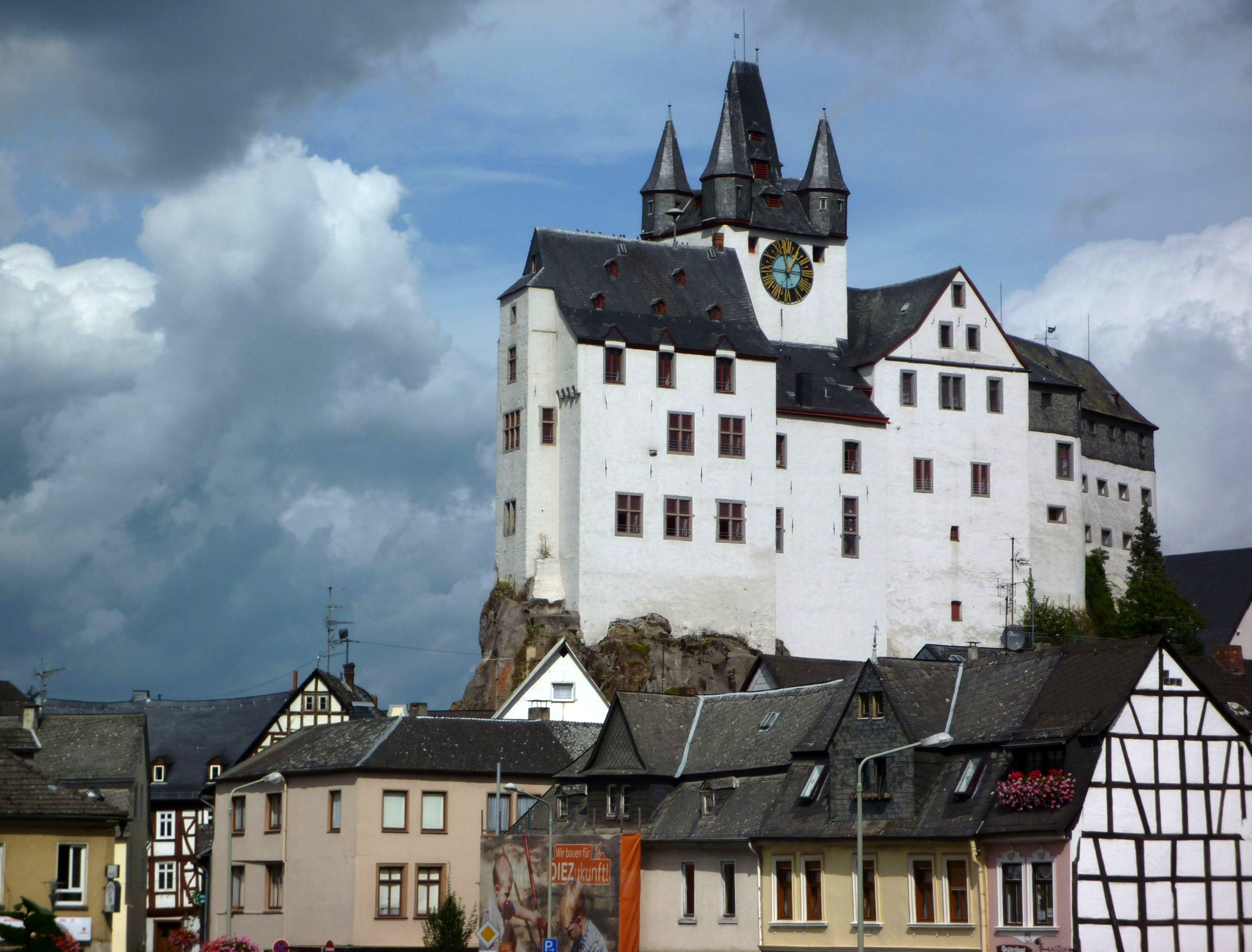
Diez Castle, Germany

William Frederick was a paternal grandson of John VI, Count of Nassau-Dillenburg, a younger brother of his wife's paternal grandfather William the Silent. When John died in 1606 his inheritance was divided among his five sons, one of which was William Frederick's father Ernest Casimir, who received the title of Count of Nassau-Dietz and followed his eldest brother William Louis, Count of Nassau-Dillenburg as Stadtholder of Friesland, Groningen and Drenthe in 1620. William Frederick inherited the Nassau-Dietz possessions, the county of Diez and the county of Spiegelberg (near Lauenstein) from his elder brother Henry Casimir I of Nassau-Dietz, who died childless in 1640.

=== Career ===
As a second son, William Frederick did not seem destined for the career he eventually would follow. He studied at Leiden University and the University of Groningen and subsequently took a commission in the army of the Dutch Republic, like his male ancestors and his brother. As such he was a junior partner of his future father in law and brother in law William II, Prince of Orange. However, his elder brother died in action near Hulst in 1640. As Henry Casimir was unmarried, and did not have children, William Frederick inherited his titles.

However, as the office of stadtholder was not yet hereditary, William Frederick only managed to be appointed in Friesland. The stadtholdership in Groningen and Drenthe went to Frederick Henry, not without a struggle with William Frederick, however. After Frederick Henry's death in 1647 William II succeeded his father also in these two provinces as stadtholder. Only when William II died in 1650, just a week before his son William III was born, did William Frederick obtain the stadtholdership in the other two provinces also.

At that time he might have obtained the stadtholdership in the five other provinces (Holland, Zeeland, Utrecht, Gelderland and Overijssel) also. After all, the stadtholderate was an appointive office. The elder branch of the Nassau family might have "first claim" to the office, but as the "claimant" was a newborn babe (William III), such a claim was not to be taken seriously. Yet, to avoid a quarrel with the members of that elder branch (William II's widow and mother) William Frederick did not press his personal claim, but offered to serve as lieutenant-stadtholder in the five provinces until the infant William III would come of age.

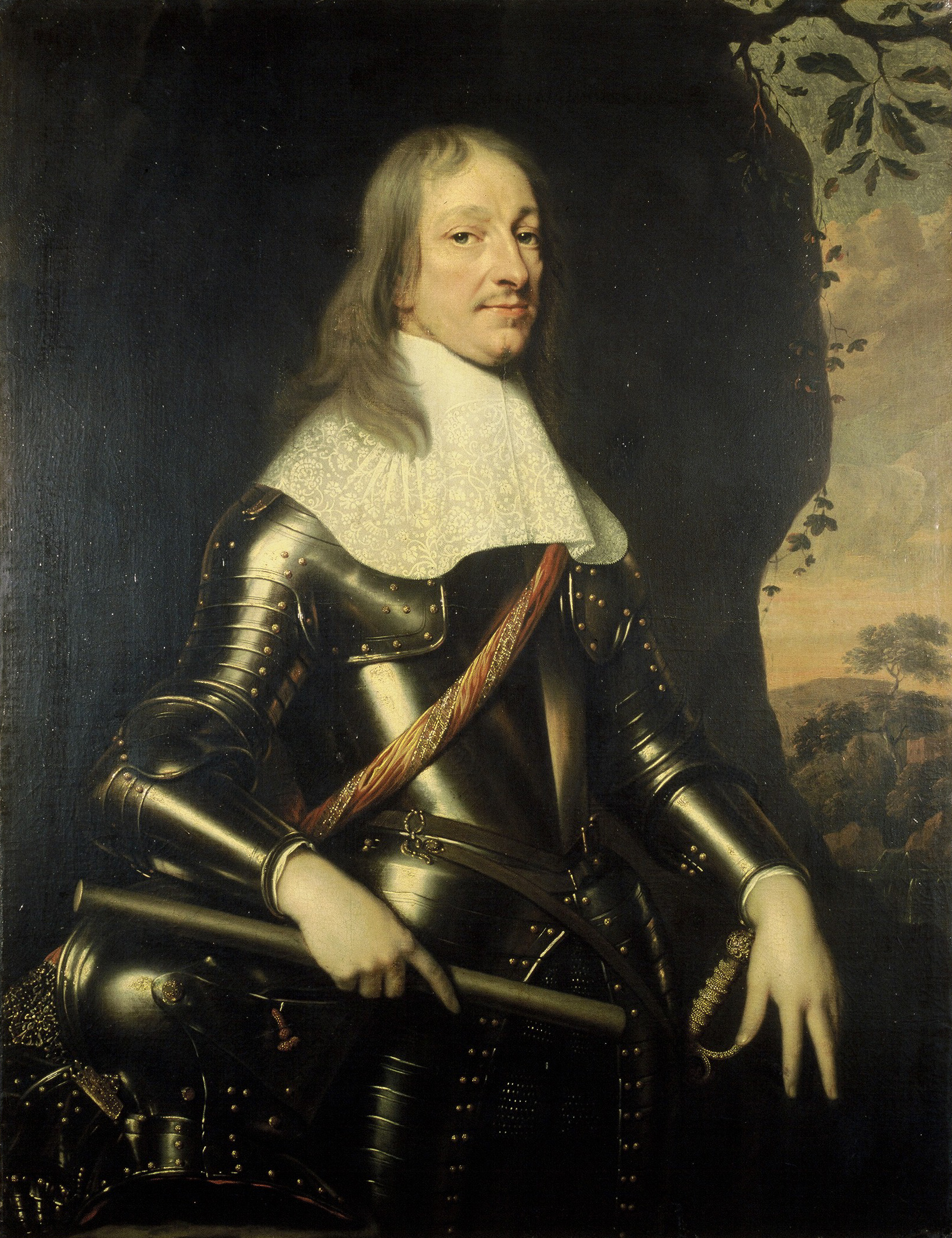
William Frederick, Prince of Nassau-Dietz in later life

He might have been taken up on that offer, except for the events that preceded the death of William II. William had performed a military coup d'état against the States of Holland in the course of a quarrel about military policy. William Frederick had played a key role in that coup by leading the attempt to seize the city of Amsterdam by force in August, 1650. Though the attempted seizure was unsuccessful, the coup had not been. However, after William's death (November 1650) the Holland Regents seized their chance to revert to the status quo ante. They decided to leave the stadtholdership vacant in their province, followed by the four other provinces in which William had been stadtholder, thus inaugurating the First Stadtholderless Period. Because of his role in the coup William Frederick was politically unacceptable, not just as a stand-in for William III, but also on his own account.

The office of stadtholder was a provincial office. On the federal level William II had fulfilled the office of Captain general of the Union, like his father and uncle before him. William Frederick again would normally have been in line for this office (after all, he was a stadtholder in his own right), except for the same political awkwardness that blocked his appointment to stadtholder in Holland. Again he offered himself as lieutenant-captain-general (the function Marlborough would fulfil in England after 1702), but again the Regents decided to leave the function vacant. William Frederick did not even get the function of acting commander-in-chief (Field Marshal), which went to a noble from Holland.

This was to be the story of William Frederick's life. He tried to act as the de facto head of the Orangist party, in opposition to the States Party faction of Grand Pensionary Johan de Witt and his uncle Cornelis de Graeff, but was usually outwitted and checked by De Witt at every step. The fact that the members of the senior branch of the family were suspicious of his ambitions made his position even more difficult, even after he married into that senior branch.

Nevertheless, outside the Netherlands those ambitions met with more success. In 1654 his title of Count was "upgraded" to Imperial Prince (Reichsfürst) by the Holy Roman Emperor. Within the Empire this provided him with more prestige, which however did not translate to more prestige in the Republic.

For a while, in the late 1650s, there seemed to be a chance of becoming Commander-in-chief, as part of a political compromise, brought together by De Witt, but nothing came of it. Only during the campaign against Bernhard von Galen during the Münster occupation of East Friesland, was he entrusted with a command in the field. He was successful in the reconquest of a strategic fortress (the Deilerschans), but shortly afterward he died on 31 October 1664 in an accident with a pistol that fired unexpectedly.

Before his death he had persuaded the States of Friesland that his son Henry Casimir II (only 7 years old in 1664) should succeed him as stadtholder. The States kept their word, accepting a "regency" of the young boy's mother. The Frisian stadtholderate was made hereditary in 1675.

== Ancestors ==
Ancestors of William Frederick, Prince of Nassau-Dietz

16. John V, Count of Nassau-Siegen
8. William I, Count of Nassau-Siegen
17. Elisabeth of Hesse-Marburg
4. John VI, Count of Nassau-Dillenburg
18. Bodo III, Count of Stolberg-Wernigerode
9. Juliana of Stolberg
19. Anna of Eppstein-Königstein
2. Ernst Casimir of Nassau-Dietz
20. John IV, Landgrave of Leuchtenberg
10. George III, Landgrave of Leuchtenberg
21. Margaret of Schwarzburg
5. Countess Elisabeth of Leuchtenberg
22. Frederick I, Margrave of Brandenburg-Ansbach
11. Barbara of Brandenburg-Ansbach-Kulmbach
23. Sophia Jagiellon
1. William Frederick, Prince of Nassau-Dietz
24. Henry V, Duke of Brunswick-Lüneburg
12. Julius, Duke of Brunswick-Lüneburg
25. Maria of Württemberg
6. Henry Julius, Duke of Brunswick-Wolfenbüttel
26. Joachim II, Elector of Brandenburg
13. Hedwig of Brandenburg
27. Hedwig Jagiellon
3. Sophia Hedwig of Brunswick-Lüneburg
28. Christian III of Denmark
14. Frederick II of Denmark
29. Dorothea of Saxe-Lauenburg
7. Elizabeth of Denmark
30. Ulrich III of Mecklenburg-Güstrow
15. Sophie of Mecklenburg-Güstrow
31. Elisabeth of Denmark

== Sources ==
- (in Dutch) "Willem Frederik" in De Nederlandsche Leeuw; Maandblad van het Genealogisch-Heraldiek Genootschap. Jrg. 7, No. 12 (1889), p. 91

William Frederick, Prince of Nassau-Dietz House of Nassau Born: 7 August 1613 Died: 31 October 1664
Political offices
Preceded by William II of Orange	Stadtholder of Friesland, Groningen and Drenthe; 1650-1664	Succeeded by Henry Casimir II
Regnal titles
Preceded by Henry Casimir I	Count of Nassau-Dietz; 1640–1654	Title elevated
New title	Prince of Nassau-Dietz; 1654–1664	Succeeded by Henry Casimir II
