= Henry Casimir I of Nassau-Dietz =

Henry Casimir I
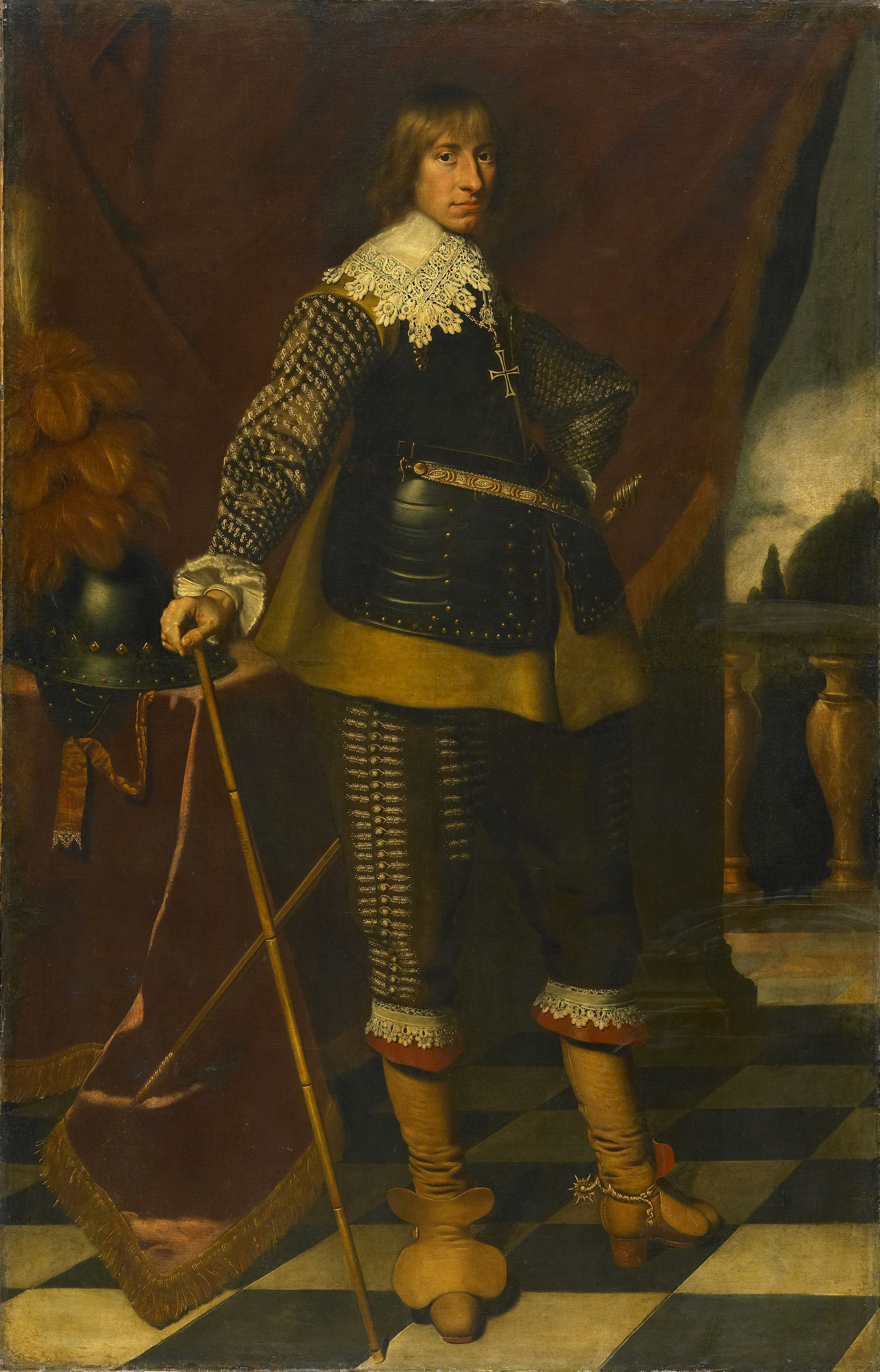
- Portrait by Wybrand de Geest, c. 1632

Count of Nassau-Dietz
- Period: 2 June 1631 – 13 July 1640
- Predecessor: Ernst Casimir
- Successor: Willem Frederik

Stadtholder of Friesland
- Reign: 2 June 1632 – 13 July 1640
- Predecessor: Ernst Casimir
- Successor: Willem Frederik

Stadtholder of Drenthe and Groningen
- Reign: 2 June 1632 – 13 July 1640
- Predecessor: Ernest Casimir
- Successor: Frederick Henry
- Born: 21 January 1612; Arnhem, Dutch Republic
- Died: 13 July 1640 (aged 28); Hulst, Dutch Republic
- Burial: Grote or Jacobijnerkerk
- Father: Ernst Casimir of Nassau-Dietz
- Mother: Sophia Hedwig of Brunswick-Lüneburg

Henry Casimir I of Nassau-Dietz (21 January 1612 – 13 July 1640) was count of Nassau-Dietz and Stadtholder of Friesland, Groningen and Drenthe.

== Life ==
He was born in Arnhem, the eldest son of Ernst Casimir of Nassau-Dietz and Sophia Hedwig of Brunswick-Lüneburg, and, like his father, died in battle.

Henry Casimir was christened at Arnhem. The English representative, Sophia Hedwig being the niece of the queen Anne of Denmark, was Sir Edward Cecil. He brought gifts of a cupboard of gilt plate, a diamond necklace with a locket, horses, and an embroidered petticoat for Sophia Hedwig.

He became count of Nassau-Dietz and stadtholder of Friesland, Groningen and Drenthe upon the death of his father, Count Ernst Casimir of Nassau-Dietz, at the Siege of Roermond in June 1632. A week later, he was involved in the Capture of Maastricht, along with his cousin, Frederick Henry, Prince of Orange.

Henry Casimir was wounded in Sint Jansteen at the battle of Hulst on 12 July 1640. He died the next day and was buried in Leeuwarden. He was succeeded by William Frederick, Prince of Nassau-Dietz. His death in at the Battle of Hulst, aged 28, prompted the creation of several memorials to him and the battle. The Rijksmuseum collection contains a blood-stained shirt he is purported to have been wearing when he was wounded. The same collection also contains his father's hat, which has a bullet hole in it.

Henry Casimir I of Nassau-Dietz House of Nassau Born: 21 January 1612 Died: 13 July 1640
Political offices
Preceded by Ernest Casimir	Stadtholder of Friesland, Groningen and Drenthe; 1632–1640	Succeeded by William Frederick
Regnal titles
Preceded by Ernest Casimir	Count of Nassau-Dietz; 1632–1640	Succeeded by William Frederick
