= Ernest Casimir, Count of Nassau-Dietz =

Ernest Casimir
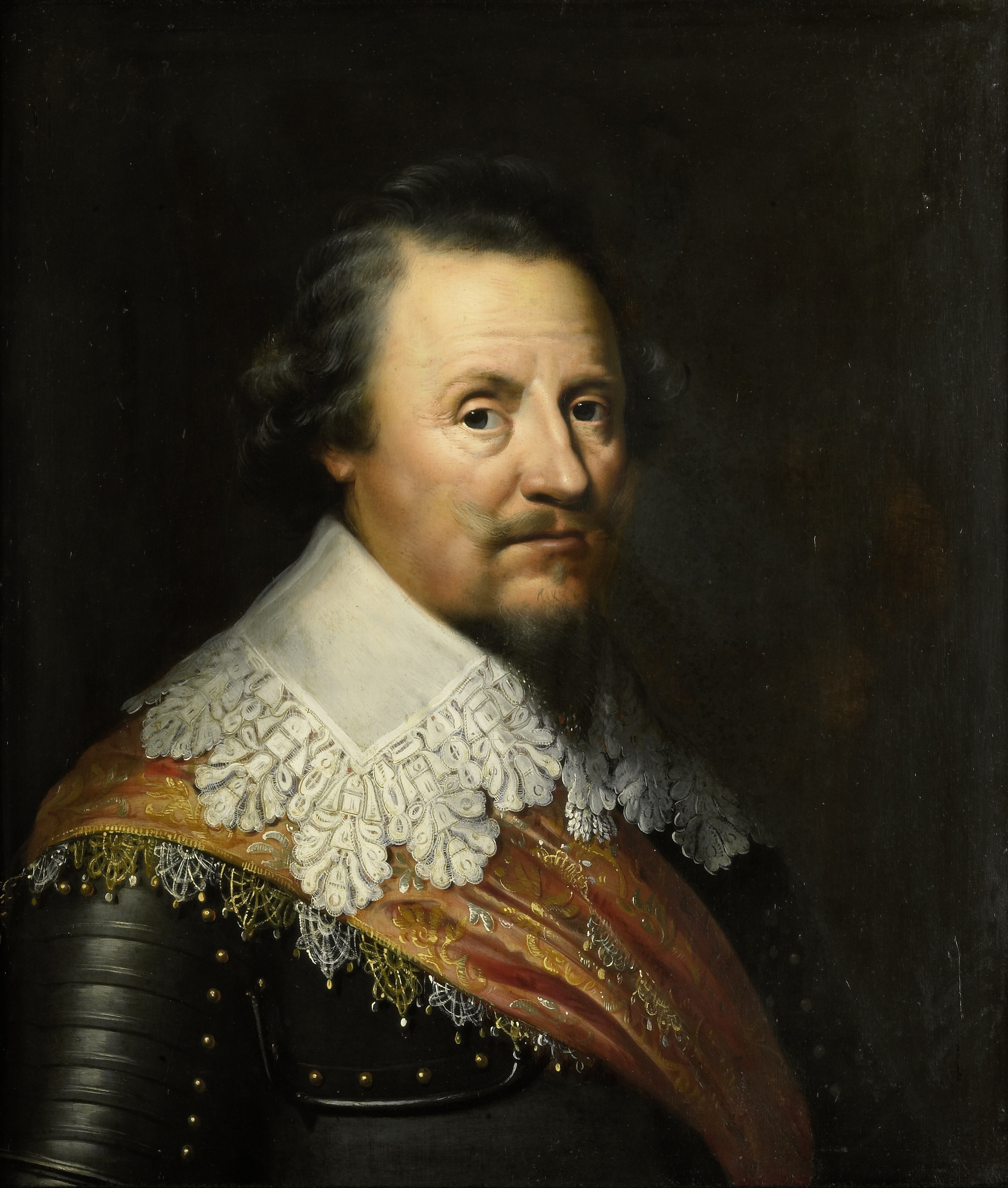
- Portrait of Ernest Casimir, Count of Nassau-Dietz

Count of Nassau-Dietz
- Reign: 8 October 1606 – 2 June 1632
- Successor: Henry Casimir I

Stadtholder of Friesland
- Reign: 13 July 1620 – 2 June 1632
- Predecessor: William Louis
- Successor: Henry Casimir I

Stadtholder of Groningen and Drenthe
- Reign: 23 April 1625 – 2 June 1632
- Predecessor: Maurice of Orange
- Successor: Henry Casimir I
- Born: Ernst Casimir; 22 December 1573; Dillenburg, Nassau-Dillenburg
- Died: 2 June 1632 (aged 58); Roermond, Duchy of Guelders
- Burial: Grote or Jacobijnerkerk
- Spouse: Sophia of Brunswick-Lüneburg (m. 1607)
- Issue: Henry Casimir I, Count of Nassau-Dietz; William Frederick, Prince of Nassau-Dietz; Maurice of Nassau-Dietz; Elizabeth Friso of Nassau Dietz
- House: House of Nassau-Dietz
- Father: Johann VI, Count of Nassau-Dillenburg
- Mother: Countess Elisabeth of Leuchtenberg

Ernest Casimir (22 December 1573 – 2 June 1632) was Count of Nassau-Dietz and Stadtholder of Friesland, Groningen and Drenthe.

== Biography ==
He was the 11th child of John VI, Count of Nassau-Dillenburg, and Countess Elisabeth of Leuchtenberg. After the death of his father, his counties Nassau-Dillenburg, Nassau-Siegen, Nassau-Dietz, and Vianden were divided among his five living sons. Ernest Casimir followed him as Count of Nassau-Dietz. In 1631, he inherited the small county of Spiegelberg near Lauenstein.

Ernest Casimir was primarily known as an outstanding military leader during the Eighty Years' War. He served under Maurice of Nassau, Prince of Orange, in the siege of the cities of Steenwijk and Oldenzaal, and Frederick Henry, Prince of Orange, during the Siege of Groenlo and the Siege of 's-Hertogenbosch. As Stadtholder of Groningen, he founded the Nieuweschans fortress in 1628. Although he owned little in Friesland, he was popular there, and people granted his heir the right to rule after his death.

He was killed by a bullet at the siege of Roermond while he was inspecting the trenches in June 1632. The hat he was wearing when he was shot and killed is now in the Rijksmuseum in Amsterdam. His son, Henry Casimir I, succeeded him as count of Nassau-Dietz and as Stadtholder of Friesland, Groningen and Drenthe.

== Family ==
In 1607, Ernest Casimir married Sophia Hedwig of Brunswick-Lüneburg, daughter of Henry Julius of Brunswick-Lüneburg. They had nine children, but two sons survived to adulthood :

1. stillborn daughter (1608)
2. stillborn son (1609)
3. unnamed son (1610)
4. Henry Casimir I, Count of Nassau-Dietz (21 January 1612 – 13 July 1640)
5. William Frederick, Prince of Nassau-Dietz (7 August 1613 – 31 October 1664), married Albertine Agnes of Nassau
6. Elizabeth (25 July – 18 September 1614)
7. John Ernest (29 March – May 1617)
8. Maurice (21 February 1619 – 18 September 1628)
9. Elizabeth Friso (25 November 1620 – 20 September 1628)

== Ancestors ==
Ancestors of Ernest Casimir, Count of Nassau-Dietz

16. John IV, Count of Nassau-Siegen
8. John V, Count of Nassau-Siegen
17. Mary of Looz-Heinsberg
4. William I, Count of Nassau-Siegen
18. Henry III of Upper Hesse
9. Elisabeth of Hesse-Marburg
19. Anna of Katzenelnbogen
2. John VI of Nassau-Dillenburg
20. Henry IX of Stolberg
10. Bodo III of Stolberg-Wernigerode
21. Matilda of Mansfeld
5. Juliana of Stolberg
22. Philip I of Eppstein-Königstein
11. Anna of Eppstein-Königstein
23. Louise de la Marck
1. Ernest Casimir of Nassau-Dietz
24. Frederick V of Leuchtenberg
12. John IV of Leuchtenberg
25. Dorothea of Rieneck
6. George III of Leuchtenberg
26. Günther XXXVIII of Schwarzburg
13. Margaret of Schwarzburg
27. Catherine of Querfurt
3. Elisabeth of Leuchtenberg
28. Albert III Achilles
14. Frederick I of Brandenburg-Ansbach
29. Anna of Saxony
7. Barbara of Brandenburg-Ansbach-Kulmbach
30. Casimir IV of Poland
15. Sophia Jagiellon of Brandenburg-Ansbach
31. Elizabeth of Austria

Ernest Casimir, Count of Nassau-Dietz House of Nassau-Dietz Born: 22 December 1573 Died: 2 June 1632
Regnal titles
| New creation | Count of Nassau-Dietz; 1606–1632 | Succeeded by Henry Casimir I |
Political offices
| Preceded by William Louis | Stadtholder of Friesland; 1620–1632 | Succeeded by Henry Casimir I |
| Preceded by Maurice of Orange | Stadtholder of Groningen and Drenthe; 1625–1632 | Succeeded by Henry Casimir I |
