= Osterwieck-Fallstein =

Coordinates: 51°58′N 10°43′E

Osterwieck-Fallstein was a Verwaltungsgemeinschaft ("collective municipality") in the district of Harz, in Saxony-Anhalt, Germany. It was situated north of the Harz, and north of Wernigerode. The seat of the Verwaltungsgemeinschaft was in Osterwieck. It was disbanded on 1 January 2010.

The Verwaltungsgemeinschaft Osterwieck-Fallstein consisted of the following municipalities:

1. Aue-Fallstein
2. Berßel
3. Bühne
4. Lüttgenrode
5. Osterwieck
6. Rhoden
7. Schauen
8. Wülperode
