= Francis Charles of Saxe-Lauenburg =

Prince of Saxe-Lauenberg

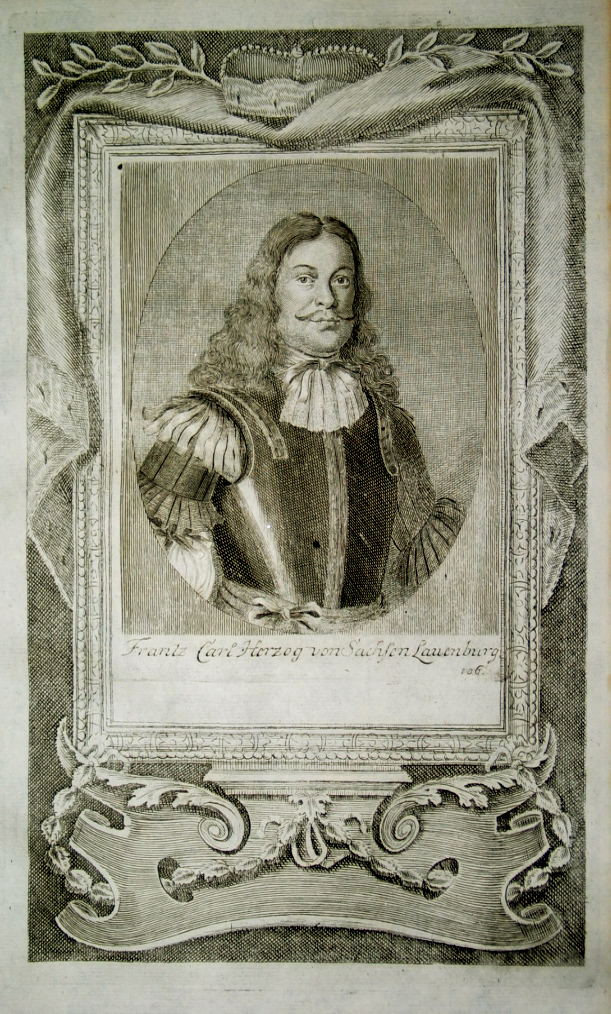
- Born: 2 May 1594
- Died: 30 November 1660 (aged 66); Neuhaus
- Spouse: Agnes of Brandenburg; Catherine of Brandenburg; Countess Elisabeth Christine of Meggau
- House: House of Ascania
- Father: Francis II of Saxe-Lauenburg
- Mother: Maria of Brunswick-Lüneburg

Francis Charles of Saxe-Lauenburg (2 May 1594 – 30 November 1660 in Neuhaus) was a prince of Saxe-Lauenburg and a general during the Thirty Years' War.

== Life ==
Francis Charles was a son of the Duke Francis II of Saxe-Lauenburg (1547–1619) from his second marriage to Maria of Brunswick-Lüneburg.

In 1619, Francis Charles and his brothers confirmed in an inheritance contract that their elder half-brother Augustus would inherit all of Saxe-Lauenburg. Francis Charles went into military service, and after serving in various armies, he eventually joined the Protestant army of Count Ernst von Mansfeld. With this army, he fought in Bohemia against Emperor Ferdinand II. Three of his brothers served in the imperial army opposing him.

In 1623, Francis Charles' elder brother Julius Henry came to a reconciliation with the Emperor. At a meeting of Protestant Princes in Lauenburg upon Elbe in 1625, it was decided to put Lower Saxony under the protection of King Christian IV of Denmark against the Emperor and his Catholic League. Francis Charles recruited a new regiment for the Danish King and quartered it in his brother's neutral Saxe-Lauenburg, where his troops took a hostile stance. After Christian IV was defeated, Francis Charles asked Wallenstein to help him seek another reconciliation with the Emperor.

On 19 September 1628 Francis Charles married Agnes of Brandenburg, widow of the Duke Philip Julius of Pomerania-Wolgast. Again with the help of Wallenstein, his brother Francis Julius achieved, that his wife was allowed keep her jointure, the district of Barth. After King Gustavus II Adolphus of Sweden had landed in Pomerania in 1630, Francis Charles entered his service as a colonel. Francis Charles was captured at the residence of his brother Augustus in Ratzeburg by the imperial general Pappenheim, but was soon back in Swedish service as a colonel. After the death of Gustavus Adolphus, Francis Charles switched sides and joined the army of the Electorate of Saxony. This allowed him to reconcile with the Emperor once again.

In 1637, Francis Charles converted to Catholicism and entered the imperial service as a major general. After the death of his first wife, and after imperial mediation Francis Charles married on 27 August 1639 in Sopron Catherine of Brandenburg, the very rich widow of the Transylvanian prince Gábor Bethlen. His second wife sold all her Hungarian possessions and moved with her husband to Germany, where she died in 1649. Francis Charles remarried in 1651 Countess Elisabeth Christine of Meggau, widow of the Baron Adolf Christoph of Teuff. After leaving the military service he toured Italy. He died in Saxe-Lauenburgian Neuhaus and, despite his three marriages, he left only children born out of wedlock.

== Ancestry ==
Ancestors of Francis Charles of Saxe-Lauenburg

16. John V, Duke of Saxe-Lauenburg
8. Magnus I, Duke of Saxe-Lauenburg
17. Dorothea of Brandenburg
4. Francis I, Duke of Saxe-Lauenburg
18. Henry IV, Duke of Brunswick and Lunenburg (Wolfenbüttel) (=#24)
9. Catherine of Brunswick and Lunenburg (Wolfenbüttel)
19. Catherine of Pomerania-Wolgast (=#25)
2. Francis II, Duke of Saxe-Lauenburg
20. Albert, Duke of Saxony
10. Henry IV the Pious, Duke of Saxe-Freiberg
21. Sidonie Podiebrad
5. Sybille of Saxe-Freiberg
22. Magnus II, Duke of Mecklenburg-Schwerin
11. Catherine of Mecklenburg-Schwerin
23. Sophia of Pomerania-Wolgast
1. Francis Charles of Saxe-Lauenburg
24. Henry IV, Duke of Brunswick and Lunenburg (Wolfenbüttel) (=#18)
12. Henry V, Duke of Brunswick and Lunenburg (Wolfenbüttel)
25. Catherine of Pomerania-Wolgast (=#19)
6. Julius, Duke of Brunswick and Lunenburg (Wolfenbüttel)
26. Henry, Count of Württemberg-Mömpelgard
13. Mary of Württemberg-Mömpelgard
27. Elisabeth of Zweibrücken-Bitsch
3. Maria of Brunswick-Lüneburg
28. Joachim I Nestor, Elector of Brandenburg
14. Joachim II Hector, Elector of Brandenburg
29. Elizabeth of Denmark, Norway, and Sweden
7. Hedwig of Brandenburg
30. Sigismund I the Old
15. Hedwig Jagiellon
31. Barbara Zápolya

== References and sources ==
- Johann Samuel Ersch: Allgemeine Encyclopädie der Wissenschaften und Künste in alphabetischer Folge, vol. 48, J. f. Gleditsch, 1848, p. 94 ff. (Digitized)
