= Anna Maria Zieglerin =

German alchemist

Anna Maria Zieglerin (c. 1550–7 February 1575) was a German alchemist who was found guilty of the murder of a courier, attempted poisoning and intent to burglarize. She was burned alive for her crimes.

== Early life ==
Most of what is known about Zieglerin’s early life comes from the court transcripts of her trial in 1575. Anna Maria Zieglerin was born ca. 1550 in Pillnitz, Germany. Zieglerin’s birth was unusual. She was born prematurely and was wrapped in skin from a woman’s body that was rubbed with a balsam for which she stayed for twelve weeks until her body was fully matured. Her parents were of minor nobility, so she spent her childhood in the Dresden Court of Augustus, Elector of Saxony and had princes and other nobles as godparents. Zieglerin was said to have had a weak composition. Zieglerin, herself, did not find her weak constitution to be an imposition. In her trial, Zieglerin claimed she did not have the flow (did not menstruate) and was more pious than others and that she wanted to be like the angels. Zieglerin’s mother attempted to marry her off to Nikolaus von Hamdorff, but Zieglerin rejected him. Angered by her rejection, he raped the fourteen-year-old Zieglerin and she became pregnant. Anna brought the baby to term in secret. After giving birth, she wrapped the baby in a linen cloth and threw it into the water. Anna later married a nobleman from Rothenburg, when she was sixteen, but the marriage was short-lived, ending after nine weeks when Zieglerin’s husband died in a riding accident. After the death of her first husband, Zieglerin ended up in Gotha. Her brother forced her to marry a court jester, Heinrich Schombach. The marriage was not a happy one. In 1566, Zieglerin and Schombach met Philipp Sömmering at a court in Gotha. Sömmering was working as an alchemist for Duke Johann Friedrich. The city was besieged in 1567; Zieglerin, Schombach and Sömmering fled together to Eschwege.

== Career ==
In 1571, Sömmering began working at the court of Duke Julius of Braunschweig-Wolfenbüttel. Sömmering asked Schombach to be his assistant; Zieglerin and Schombach began working for the Duke alongside Sömmering. They were tasked with creating the Philosopher’s Stone, so they could create gold and gemstones for the Duke. The Philosopher’s Stone was what alchemists in the sixteenth-century aspired to create. In its pure form, it was thought to be a red stone or powder that could change something from one thing to another, cure diseases and make anyone who consumed it, live forever (the elixir of life).

It is unclear how Zieglerin was first introduced to alchemy. She would have had interactions with alchemists growing up at the court of Augustus and Anna of Saxony; both of whom had an interest in alchemy. She may have begun learning her craft when she was at Duke Johann Friedrich's court in Gotha. By the time she got to Wolfenbüttel, she was familiar with alchemy and this is where her practices began. Zieglerin had her own laboratory in Wolfenbüttel and had at least one assistant. She worked alone, as well as alongside Sommering. A letter Zieglerin wrote in September 1573 shows what Zieglerin was working on : 'Your princely grace,' she wrote, 'I am sending you this small lump; the greatest little stone [i.e., the philosophers' stone] I have set again in the wine so that it does not entirely dissolve into the air ... in a short time I want to show Your Princely Grace something greater ... Tonight with the help of God in heaven we want to begin the two pounds of quicksilver.” Along with letters that Zieglerin wrote, her work can be seen in a twenty-page booklet "Concerning the Noble and Precious Art of Alcamia," which she sent to Duke Julius in 1573. Zieglerin’s interests primarily included a practical and effective alchemy; she was not as interested in creation of knowledge like other alchemists of the time. She was more interested in the production of things.

Zieglerin created a golden oil which she called "lion's blood". It could be used to make gemstones, medicines and the Philosopher’s Stone. The Stone, Zieglerin theorized in her manuscript, could be created from two methods. The first method required the alchemist to make a gold that was thirteen grades higher than the best Arabian gold out of lead, rubies and some type of brown powder. This gold was called the Golden Lion. When the gold was heated, it would produce a red oil, the lion’s blood. This oil then had to be combined with lead and heated further which would produce another oil. This oil was to be fed to a small bird. After six weeks, the bird was to be roasted until it turned into a brown glass, then ground up. The second method involved creating two little stones; one looked like a crystal and the other a small brown stone. The two stones then had to be combined to create the Philosopher’s Stone. When the new stone was made, it would look like a ruby.

As with many of her contemporaries, Zieglerin used Christian references in her alchemic work. Zieglerin’s process of using the lion's blood to make the Philosopher’s Stone involved the death of a small bird. The sacrifice of the bird was a reenactment of the crucifixion of Christ and his sacrifice on the cross. Zieglerin connected many elements of her alchemic works to Christianity. According to Tara Nummedal, Zieglerin used her holy alchemy as "a powerful spiritual instrument that she could wield to intervene in one of the most pressing spiritual issues of the day, the coming apocalypse… a belief that alchemy could probe the porous boundary between the natural and the supernatural." Zieglerin’s oil was also thought to be able to produce fruit during the winter months which could provide food all year, create gemstones, such as diamonds, sapphires and rubies and could cure certain illnesses, such as leprosy.

In contrast to other alchemists of the time that only wanted to reproduce minerals, Zieglerin wanted to reproduce human life through her alchemic work. Zieglerin used her alchemical practices to try and create human life naturally, through the process of intercourse. However, she believed her Lion’s Blood would accelerate the gestation process and could create mature fetuses after four to six weeks in the womb. Zieglerin wrote: "If you want to beget a child, then take nine drops of the above-mentioned oil for three days, one after the other, evenings and mornings. Also give your wife the same ... But when [she] is pregnant with the child, then give her once a day no more than three drops of the oil." These children were then supposed to live forever and never get sick.

In order to give herself credibility as an alchemist when she entered the court of Duke Julius, she created the fictional Count Carl von Oettingen, son of Paracelsus. Count Carl was supposed to be the son of famous physician and alchemist Paracelsus, giving Count Carl a prestigious alchemical heritage. Talk of Count Carl drew the attention of Duke Julius and Sömmering. Zieglerin, instead of telling everyone that all the work she did was her own, told people that she was learning everything she knew from Count Carl and that he was the one performing many of the alchemic works. Count Carl was supposed to have given Zieglerin a powder that could turn lead into gold. Zieglerin and Count Carl were intended, in Zieglerin’s eyes, to have many of the aforementioned Lion’s Blood children. These children were all supposed to be girls and would not menstruate like their mother. Zieglerin fully believed her story of the Count and continued to tell the tale of the mysterious man in her trial.

== Trial and death ==
After Zieglerin, Sömmering and Schombach were unable to provide the Duke with the Philosopher’s Stone as promised, Duke Julius asked for them to repay the sum of 2000 talers he had already given them. Sömmering fled which incriminated the entire group and led to their arrest. The three were put on trial in 1574 for multiple crimes, including the murder of a courier, attempted poisoning of Duchess Hedwig and copying keys to the Duke’s chambers with the intent to steal some papers. However, it is hypothesized that their real crime was not being able to produce the Philosopher’s Stone and their attempt at covering up the fact that they had not produced the Stone. The three were tortured and all eventually confessed to their crimes. Sömmering and Schombach were both burned with hot tongs repeatedly and then quartered alive. Zieglerin’s skin was pinched off and then she was burned alive while strapped to an iron stool.

== Women and alchemic work ==
Two of the most well-known women alchemists of the sixteenth-century were Isabella Cortese and Anna Maria Zieglerin. Cortese was the only female alchemist to have a book printed in the sixteenth-century, I secreti della signora Isabella Cortese; however, Zieglerin pursued alchemic work in the court of Duke Julius of Braunschweig-Wolfenbüttel and wrote pamphlets. Female alchemists did exist in the sixteenth-century, but many did not identify as alchemists which makes it difficult to determine how prevalent it was for women to have actually been alchemists. According to Tara Nummedal, “If, however, we shift our focus beyond printed alchemical texts and toward the archival sources characteristic of the new social history, suddenly we do find women alchemists. Letters, contracts and criminal trial dossiers reveal that both noble and common women engaged in the patronage, theory and practice of alchemy.” Being a woman presented Zieglerin with challenges and perspectives that were different than her male colleagues. One of Zieglerin’s main goals was to create children and she was to be a vessel for these children.
