= Francis Julius of Saxe-Lauenburg =

German prince

- Born: 13 September 1584; Ratzeburg
- Died: 8 October 1634 (aged 50); Vienna
- Noble family: House of Ascania
- Spouse: Agnes of Württemberg
- Father: Francis II, Duke of Saxe-Lauenburg
- Mother: Maria of Brunswick-Lüneburg

Duke Francis Julius of Sachsen-Lauenburg (13 September 1584 in Ratzeburg – 8 October 1634 in Vienna) was a prince of Saxe-Lauenburg.

== Life ==
Julius Francis was the eldest son of Francis II, Duke of Saxe-Lauenburg from his second marriage, Maria of Brunswick-Lüneburg, the daughter of Julius, Duke of Brunswick-Wolfenbüttel. His education and training, like that of his siblings, was patchy and superficial. His older half-brother Augustus succeeded his father in 1619 as Duke of Saxe-Lauenburg. On 4 October 1619 he signed a contract with his brothers. He acknowledged his brother as the ruling Duke and in return he received the Anker Manor as a residence and an annual pension of 2500 thalers.

Julius Francis served as a chamberlain at the imperial court in Vienna and was entrusted with several diplomatic missions by Emperor Ferdinand II.

When his brother Augustus occupied Amt Neuhaus, which was Francis Julius's mother's wittum, Francis Julius objected vehemently. The dispute lasted until Francis Julius's death. Francis Julius also initiated, on behalf of his family, a case before the Aulic Council against the city of Hamburg, about the ownership of the district and castle of Ritzebüttel (today's Cuxhaven).

Francis Julius died in 1634 in Vienna. He probably died of the plague. Since he had outlived his children and did not have an heir, Anker Manor fell back to Augustus.

== Marriage and children ==
On 14 May 1620, Francis Julius married Agnes (1592–1629), the daughter of Frederick I, Duke of Württemberg. They had seven children, who all died young:

- Maria Franciska (1621–1621)
- Maria Sibylla (1622–1623)
- Frederick Francis (1623–1625)
- Julius Francis (1624–1625)
- Johanna Juliane (1626–1626)
- Francis Ferdinand (1628–1629)
- Francis Louis (1629–1629)

== Ancestry ==
Ancestors of Francis Julius of Saxe-Lauenburg

16. John V, Duke of Saxe-Lauenburg
8. Magnus I, Duke of Saxe-Lauenburg
17. Dorothea of Brandenburg
4. Francis I, Duke of Saxe-Lauenburg
18. Henry IV, Duke of Brunswick and Lunenburg (Wolfenbüttel) (=#24)
9. Catherine of Brunswick and Lunenburg (Wolfenbüttel)
19. Catherine of Pomerania-Wolgast (=#25)
2. Francis II, Duke of Saxe-Lauenburg
20. Albert, Duke of Saxony
10. Henry IV the Pious, Duke of Saxe-Freiberg
21. Sidonie Podiebrad
5. Sybille of Saxe-Freiberg
22. Magnus II, Duke of Mecklenburg-Schwerin
11. Catherine of Mecklenburg-Schwerin
23. Sophia of Pomerania-Wolgast
1. Francis Julius of Saxe-Lauenburg
24. Henry IV, Duke of Brunswick and Lunenburg (Wolfenbüttel) (=#18)
12. Henry V, Duke of Brunswick and Lunenburg (Wolfenbüttel)
25. Catherine of Pomerania-Wolgast (=#19)
6. Julius, Duke of Brunswick and Lunenburg (Wolfenbüttel)
26. Henry, Count of Württemberg-Mömpelgard
13. Mary of Württemberg-Mömpelgard
27. Elisabeth of Zweibrücken-Bitsch
3. Maria of Brunswick-Lüneburg
28. Joachim I Nestor, Elector of Brandenburg
14. Joachim II Hector, Elector of Brandenburg
29. Elizabeth of Denmark, Norway, and Sweden
7. Hedwig of Brandenburg
30. Sigismund I the Old
15. Hedwig Jagiellon
31. Barbara Zápolya
