= Fallstein =

Fallstein may refer to the following places in Saxony-Anhalt, Germany:

- Großer Fallstein, a wooded region north of the Harz mountains
- Aue-Fallstein, a municipality in the district of Harz
