= Elisabeth of Brunswick-Wolfenbüttel (1567–1618) =

German noblewoman

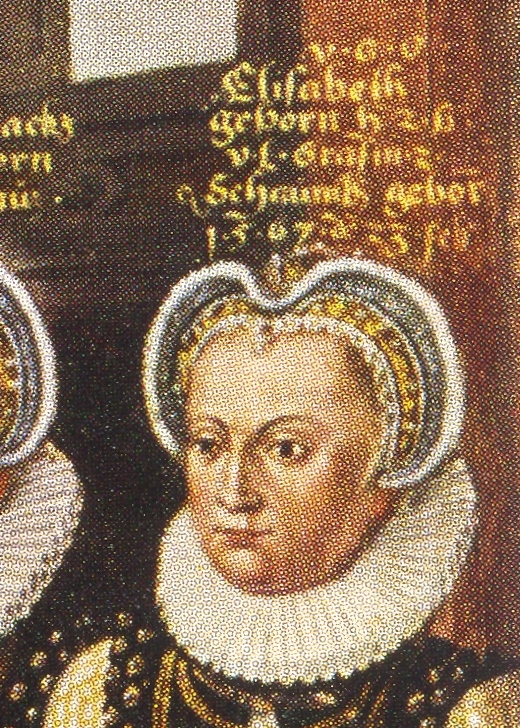
- Born: 23 February 1567; Hessen Castle in Hessen
- Died: 24 October 1618 (aged 51); Otterndorf
- Buried: Harburg, Hamburg
- Noble family: House of Welf
- Spouses: Count Adolph XIV of Holstein-Schauenburg; Christopher, Duke of Brunswick-Harburg
- Issue: Julius
- Father: Julius, Duke of Brunswick-Lüneburg
- Mother: Hedwig of Brandenburg

Elisabeth of Brunswick-Wolfenbüttel (23 February 1567 at Hessen Castle in Hessen – 24 October 1618 in Otterndorf) was a German noblewoman. She was princess of Brunswick-Wolfenbüttel by birth and by her first marriage Countess of Holstein-Schauenburg and then by her second marriage Duchess of Brunswick-Harburg.

== Life ==
Elisabeth was a daughter of Duke Julius of Brunswick-Wolfenbüttel (1528–1589) from his marriage with Hedwig (1540–1602), a daughter of Elector Joachim II of Brandenburg.

In 1568, Gandersheim Abbey turned Protestant, under pressure from Julius. However, the abbess, Margaret of Chlum was still Catholic. Julius tried to have Elisabeth elected in her place. However, the Abbey's chapter refused to do so. In 1582, Julius abandoned this plan and started looking around for a suitable husband from Elisabeth.

Elisabeth married for the first time on 6 May 1583 in Wolfenbütel to Count Adolph XIV of Holstein-Schauenburg (1547–1601), son of Otto IV of Schaumburg.

After Adolph's death, she remarried on 28 October 1604 at Harburg Castle to Duke Christopher of Brunswick-Harburg (1570–1606). He died two years later, after a fall in Harburg Castle.

From 1609 to 1617, Elisabeth lived in Bremen, at the expense of the town of Harburg. In 1617, she returned to Harburg. She died a year later, in Otterndorf. She was buried in Harburg, Hamburg, next to her second husband.

== Issue ==
From her first marriage, she had a son:

- Julius (1585–1601)

Her second marriage was childless.
