= Philip Sigismund of Brunswick-Wolfenbüttel =

Roman Catholic bishop (1568–1623)

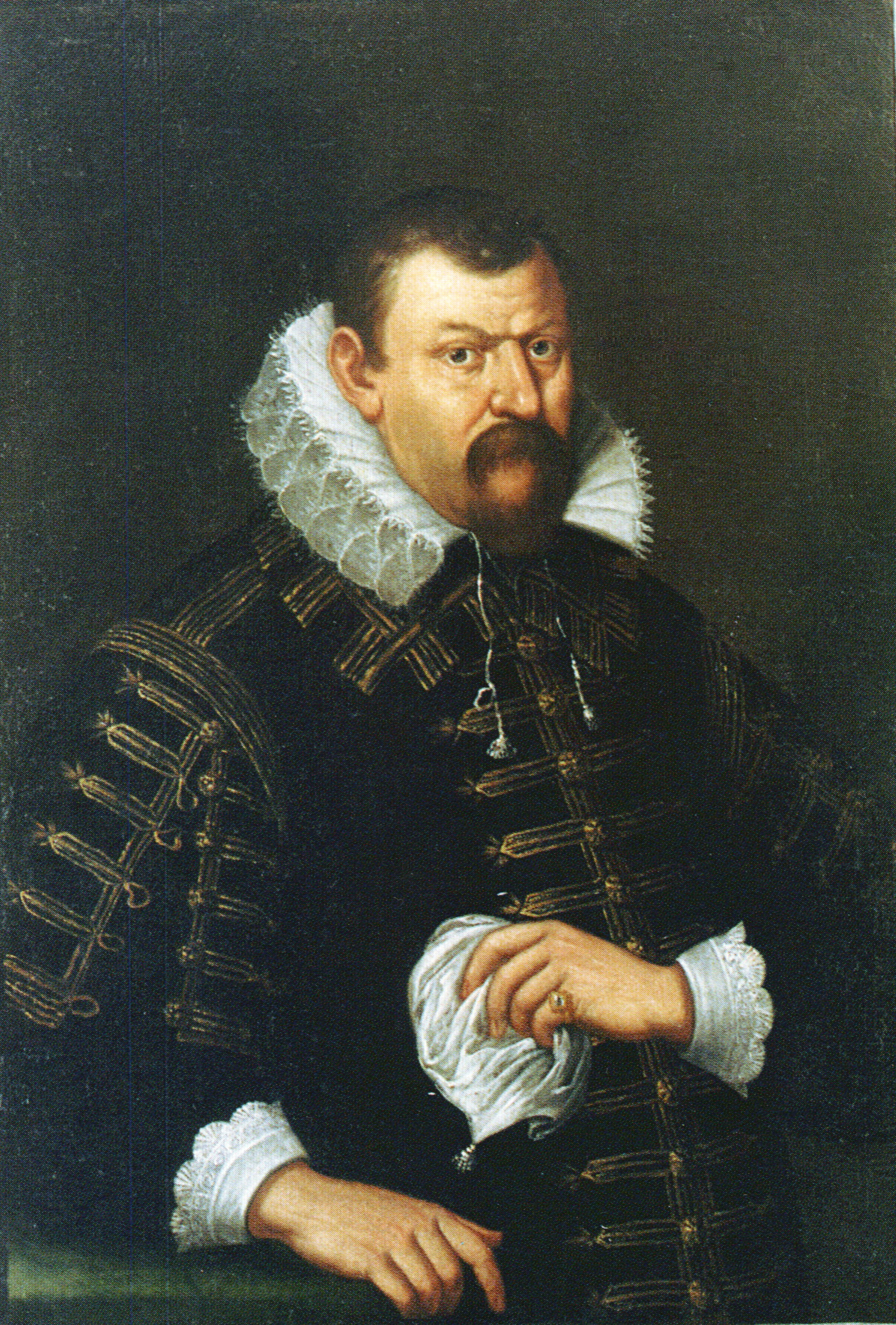
Philip Sigismund

Duke Philip Sigismund of Brunswick-Wolfenbüttel (July 1, 1568 in Hessen am Fallstein – 19 March 1623 in Iburg) was a Lutheran administrator of the Prince-Bishopric of Verden and Osnabrück (1591–1623) son of Julius, Duke of Brunswick and Lunenburg, Prince of Wolfenbüttel and Hedwig of Brandenburg.

Philip Sigismund of Brunswick-Wolfenbüttel House of Welf Cadet branch of the House of Este Born: 1 July 1568 Died: 19 March 1623
Religious titles
Regnal titles
Preceded by Eberhard of Holle as Lutheran Prince-Bishop	Administrator of the Prince-Bishopric of Verden; 1586–1623	Succeeded by Frederick II as Lutheran administrator
Preceded by Bernard of Waldeck as Catholic Prince-Bishop	Administrator of the Prince-Bishopric of Osnabrück; 1591–1623	Succeeded by Eitel Frederick as Catholic Prince-Bishop
