= Winfried Freudenberg =

East German man who died trying to cross the Berlin Wall

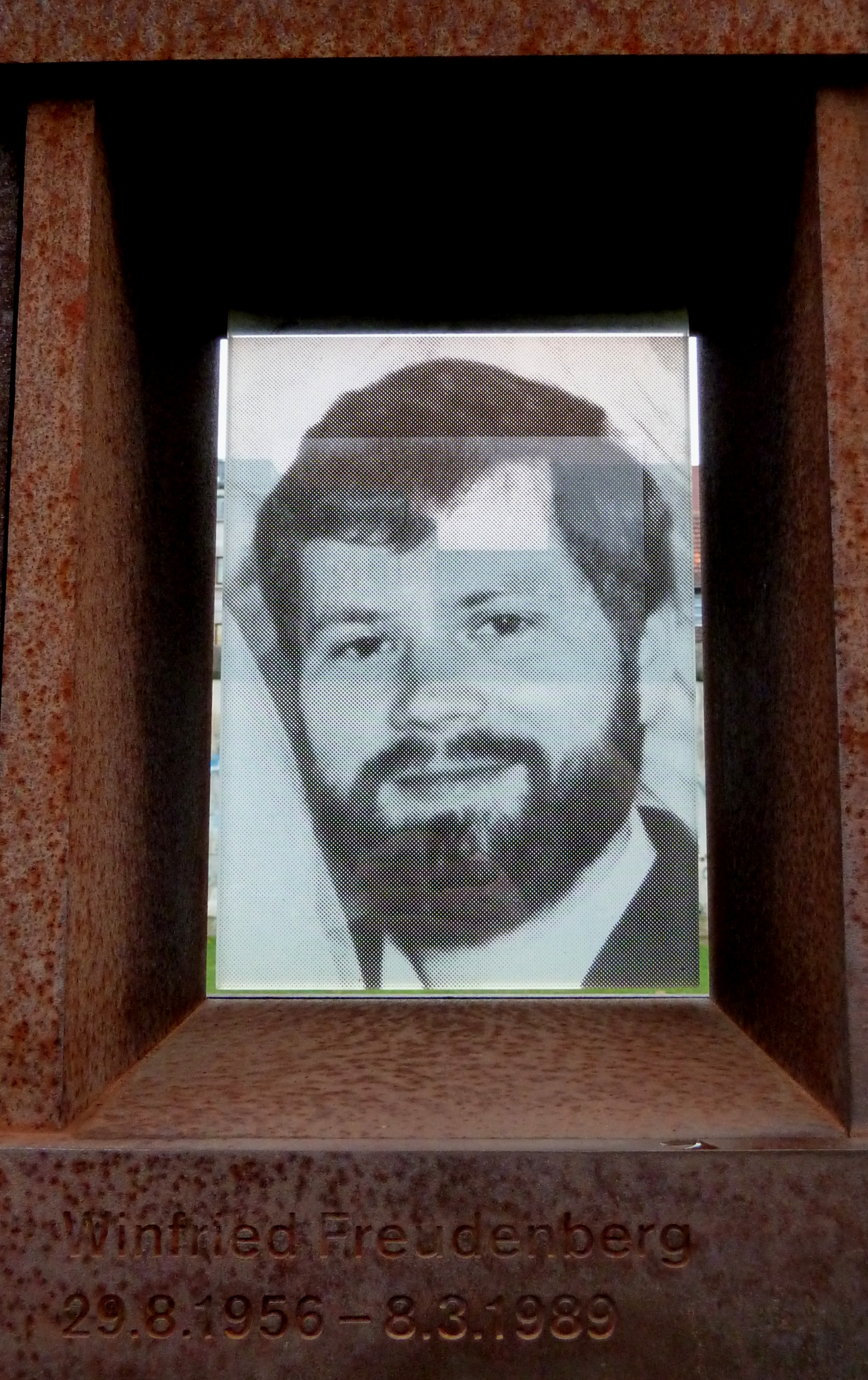
- Freudenberg at the Window of Remembrance, Berlin Wall Memorial, Bernauer Straße
- Born: 29 August 1956; Osterwieck, East Germany
- Died: 8 March 1989 (aged 32); Zehlendorf, West Berlin, West Germany
- Cause of death: Home-made gas balloon crash whilst attempting to leave East Berlin; 52.4297°N 13.2239°E
- Body discovered: Backyard of a garden villa in Zehlendorf; 52.4394°N 13.2318°E
- Occupation: Electrical Engineer
- Known for: Last fatality in an attempt to defect from East Germany across the Berlin Wall

Winfried Freudenberg (29 August 1956 – 8 March 1989) was the last person to die in an attempt to escape from East Germany to West Berlin across the Berlin Wall as he fell from an improvised gas balloon at high altitude over West Berlin.

== Biography ==
Freudenberg was born in Osterwieck and grew up in the Saxony-Anhalt town of Lüttgenrode, near what was then the border between West Germany and his native East Germany, a part of the communist Eastern Bloc, as a satellite state of the Soviet Union. After completing an apprenticeship as an electrician, he obtained his secondary education diploma at night school, then trained in information technology (computer science) and received a diploma as an electronics engineer. In the autumn of 1988, he married his wife Sabine, a chemist he had met while both were students at Ilmenau University.

With the erection of The Wall, East Germany cut them off from the professional opportunities that existed in the West, and the couple, especially Winfried, had become increasingly disappointed about being unable to cross the border. Immediately after the wedding, the two began planning their escape to the West via a homemade balloon filled with natural gas (because its main component, methane, is lighter than air, natural gas can serve as a lifting gas).

== Escape attempt and death ==
As part of their plan, Freudenberg took a job in a public utility that supplied natural gas, and the couple took an apartment in the East Berlin neighborhood of Prenzlauer Berg. In January and February 1989, they began assembling a 13-metre (43 ft) tall by 11 metres (36 ft) diameter balloon envelope out of polyethylene, which they cut into strips, taped together, and engirded with a string net. There was no basket, only a narrow wooden beam.

On the evening of 7 March, they decided that the wind conditions were favourable for their escape. They drove to a pressure regulating station in the Blankenburg neighborhood to which Freudenberg had the keys and at midnight began to fill their balloon with gas. From some time after 1:00 a.m. the balloon was visible from a distance. A waiter on his way home from work, which had ended at 1:30 a.m., noticed the balloon and called the Volkspolizei.

When the couple heard a patrol car arriving shortly after 2:00 a.m., the balloon was not yet completely filled. Because they feared it would not lift both of them, and Sabine was always doubtful, they quickly decided Freudenberg would escape alone. He occupied the beam and cut the tethers. With only one person aboard, the balloon had a very high buoyancy and rose fast. Ballast bags hanging down on ropes severed a power line shortly after launching, and caused it to short-cut and spark. Although East German security had often shot and killed citizens attempting to escape, they decided against shooting because of the possibility of triggering an explosion of the natural gas now leaking. Also, they believed Freudenberg had been killed by the current (which was not the case). 23-year-old Sabine was able to get back home, where the Stasi were already waiting for her.

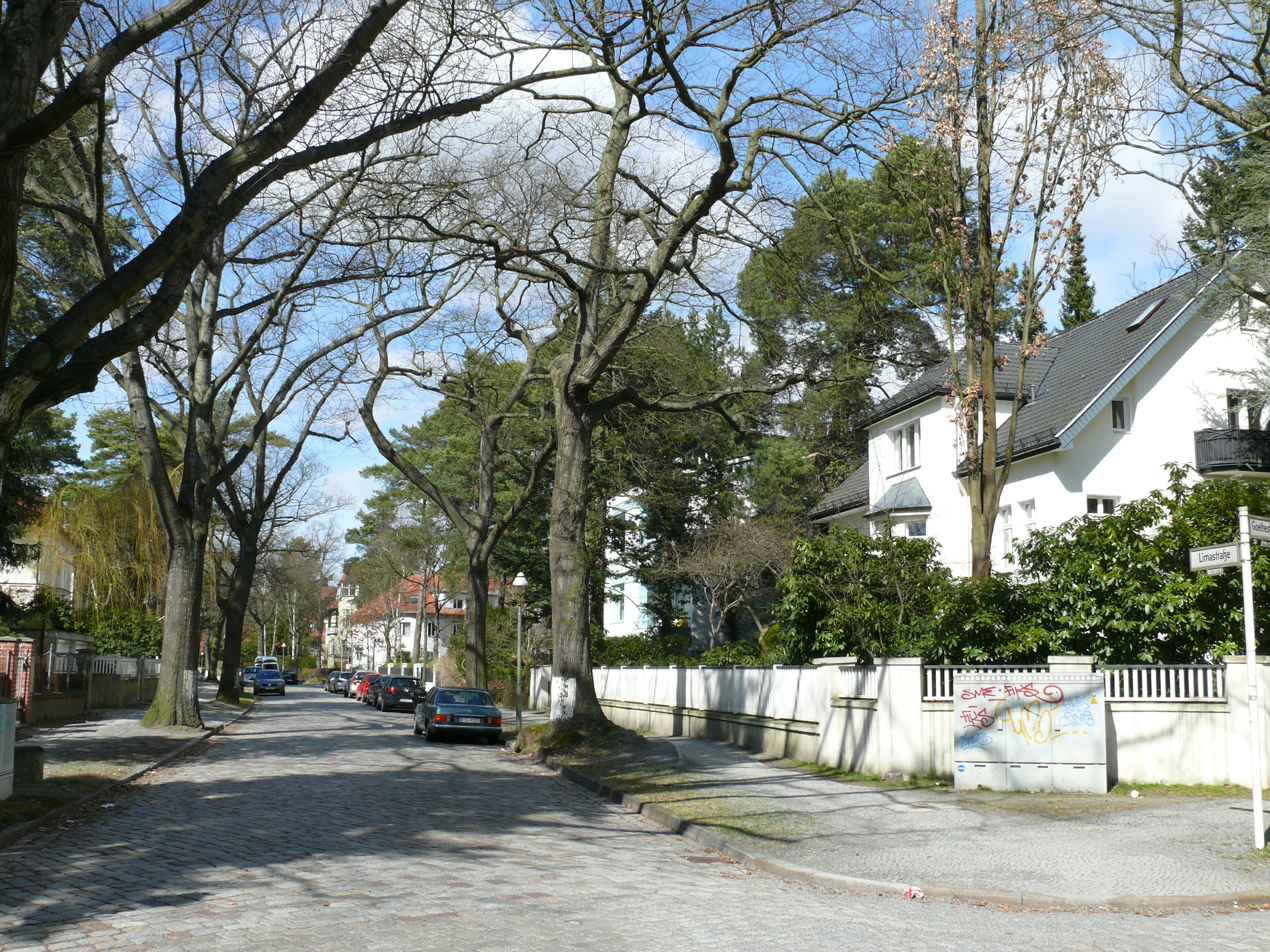
Freudenburg's body was found in the garden of a villa on Limastrasse in Zehlendorf

The improvised balloon had too much buoyancy and, because it lacked a properly working valve, it rose quickly and much higher than planned. Freudenberg couldn't sink and spent more than five hours aloft. At first, his course was west-south-west. With wind velocities of about 20 km/h (12 mph) at the time he must have reached West Berlin after about 20 minutes. Later, Freudenberg passed over the Berlin Tegel Airport where he lost or dropped some ballast. His altitude must at this point have increased to more than 2,000 meters (6,600 feet), as his course now changed to south due to different direction of higher altitude winds. The balloon was sighted over Teufelsberg hill at dawn, where it was mistaken for a weather balloon. Shortly before flying into East German territory again, at 7:30, Freudenberg fell into the garden of a villa in the suburb of Zehlendorf. The remains of the balloon came down about one kilometer (1,100 yards) away on the median strip of a thoroughfare. Freudenberg's body was discovered hours later in the garden of a villa on Limastrasse. He evidently died instantly from injuries sustained in the crash. Nearly every bone in his body had been broken, and virtually every internal organ had been damaged.

The direct cause of the crash is unclear. West Berlin police supposed that Freudenberg climbed the net to cut the envelope, evidently succeeded, and in the ensuing events lost his hold.

After the incident, East German police investigated Freudenberg's friends, family, acquaintances, colleagues, and wife, to determine whether any had participated in the escape attempt. Because of international attention and pressure over the recent shooting of Chris Gueffroy, the last refugee to be shot by East German border guards, Sabine was given the relatively lenient sentence of three years probation and then granted amnesty in October 1989. The next month, East Germany began allowing its citizens to travel to the West, and several months later, the Berlin Wall fell and the two countries reunified.

== See also ==
- East German balloon escape
- List of deaths at the Berlin Wall
- Berlin Crisis of 1961
