= Philipp Sömmering =

Philipp Sömmering (c. 1535 - 17 February 1575) was a German (Wolfenbüttel) alchemist and fraudster. He called himself Therocyclus.

== Patron ==
Together with Anna Maria Zieglerin and Schombach, Sömmering worked for Julius, Duke of Brunswick-Lüneburg, tasked with producing the philosopher's stone.

== Trial and death ==
After Zieglerin, Sömmering and Schombach were unable to provide the Duke with the Philosopher's Stone as promised, Duke Julius asked for them to repay the sum of 2000 thalers he had already given them. Sömmering fled which incriminated the entire group and led to their arrest. The three were put on trial in 1574 for multiple crimes, including the murder of a courier, attempted poisoning of Duchess Hedwig and copying keys to the Duke's chambers with the intent to steal some papers. However, it is hypothesized that their real crime was not being able to produce the Philosopher's Stone and their attempt at covering up the fact that they had not produced the Stone. The three were tortured and all eventually confessed to their crimes. Sömmering and Schombach were both burned with hot tongs repeatedly and then quartered alive. Zieglerin's skin was pinched off and then she was burned alive while strapped to an iron stool.

== Bibliography ==
- Albert von Rhamm, Die betrüglichen Goldmacher am Hofe des Herzogs Julius von Braunschweig, Wolfenbüttel 1883. (German)
- Heinz Grunow, Die Spur führt nach Wolfenbüttel : Bericht über den größten Kriminalprozeß des 16. Jahrhunderts, Wolfenbüttel, 1976. (German)
- Georg Schwedt, Chemische Experimente in Schlössern, Klöstern und Museen, Wiley-VCH, 2009. (German)
