= Osterwieck =

- Town
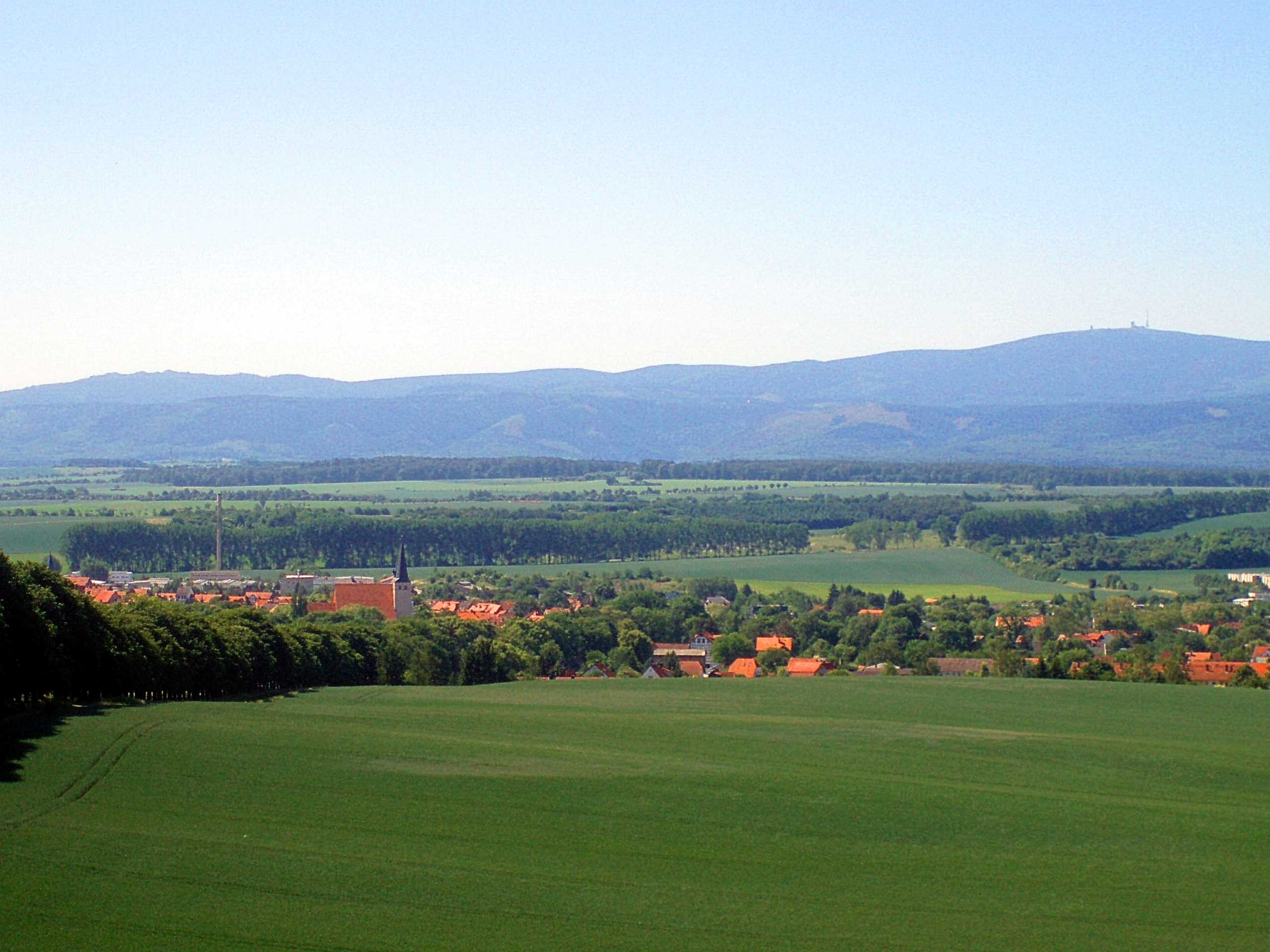
- View over Osterwieck and Harz range

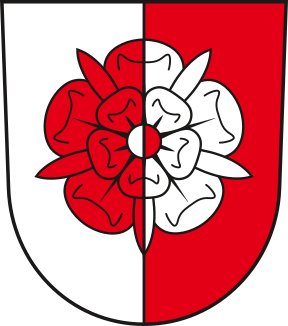
- Coat of arms

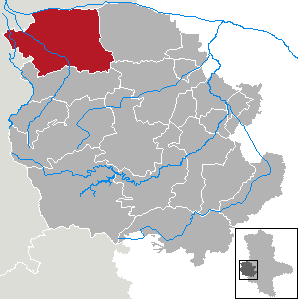
- Location of Osterwieck within Harz district
- Interactive map of Osterwieck
- Location within Germany Location within Saxony-Anhalt
- Coordinates: 51°58′N 10°43′E
- Country: Germany
- State: Saxony-Anhalt
- District: Harz

Government
  - Mayor (2021–28): Dirk Heinemann (SPD)

Area
  - Total: 212.91 km^{2} (82.21 sq mi)
- Elevation: 123 m (404 ft)

Population (2025-12-31)
  - Total: 10,949
  - Density: 51.425/km^{2} (133.19/sq mi)
- Time zone: UTC+01:00 (CET)
  - Summer (DST): UTC+02:00 (CEST)
- Postal codes: 38835
- Dialling codes: 039421, 039422, 039458
- Vehicle registration: HZ
- Website: www.stadt-osterwieck.de

Osterwieck (German pronunciation: [ˈoːstɐˌviːk]) is a historic town in the Harz district, in the German state of Saxony-Anhalt.

== Geography ==
The municipal area stretches along the river Ilse, north of Wernigerode and the Harz mountain range.

The town Osterwieck consists of the following Ortschaften or municipal divisions:

- Berßel
- Bühne
- Dardesheim
- Deersheim
- Hessen
- Lüttgenrode
- Osterode am Fallstein
- Osterwieck
- Rhoden
- Rohrsheim
- Schauen
- Veltheim
- Wülperode
- Zilly

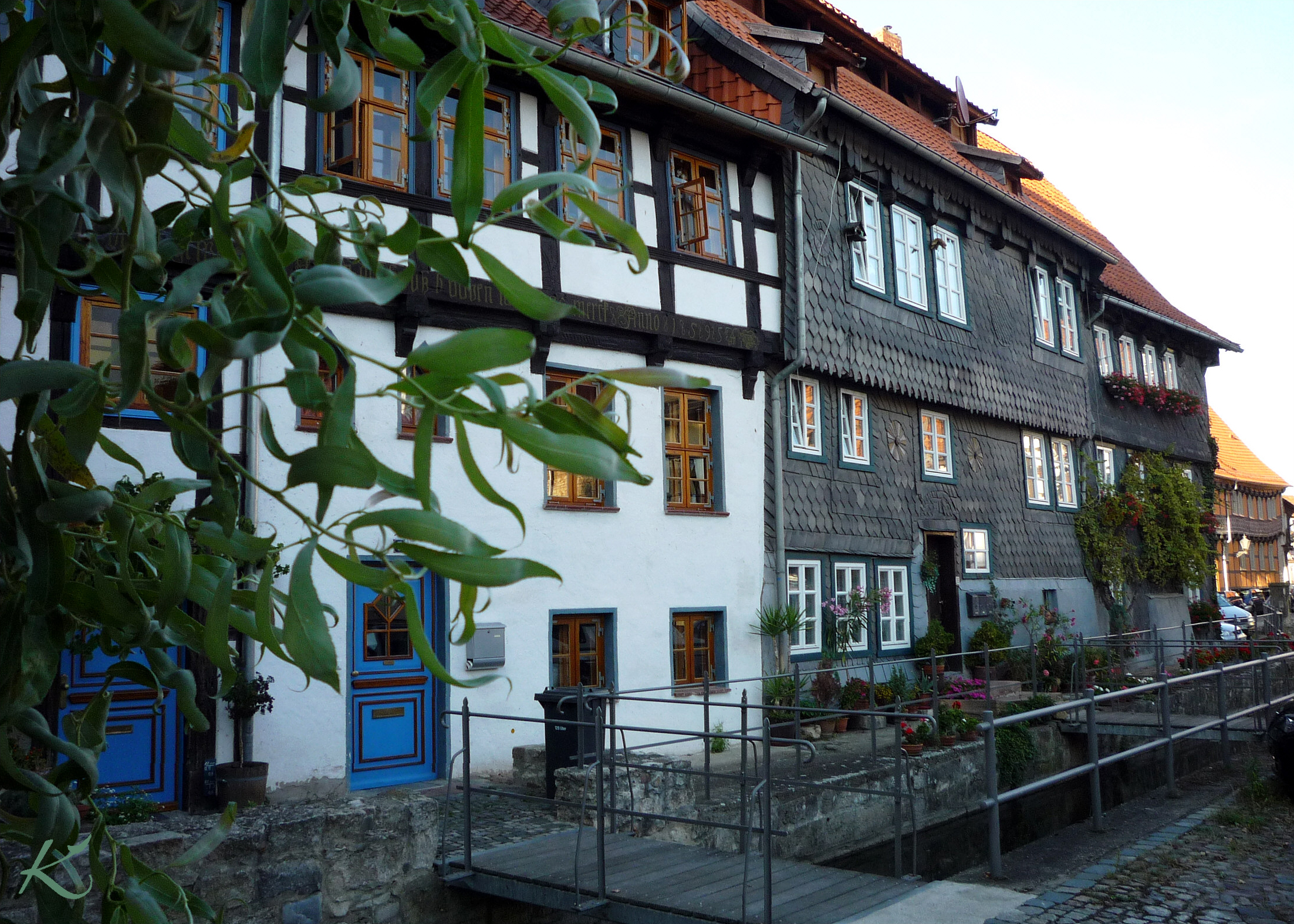
Old town ensemble

The Altstadt (Old Town) with St. Stephen's Church is a stop on the scenic German Timber-Frame Road and on the Romanesque Road.

== History ==
The settlement was first mentioned about 780 when Charlemagne in course of the Saxon Wars crossed the Oker river and had a church dedicated to Saint Stephen erected at a place then called Salingenstede. This church became a centre of the Christian mission among the pagan Saxons, overseen by Hildegrim of Châlons, and the origin of the later Bishopric of Halberstadt. On 1 April 974, Emperor Otto II issued a deed granting market and mint rights to Seligenstadt, this is commonly regarded as the date of the town's foundation.

The name Osterwieck was first mentioned in a 1073 letter by Archbishop Liemar of Bremen to Bishop Burchard II of Halberstadt. Destroyed by a blaze in 1511, the town was rebuilt and today features an ensemble of about 400 Fachwerk buildings. The nave of the St. Stephen Church erected in the 16th century is one of the oldest Protestant church buildings, while its Romanesque twin steeples date back to 1100.

On 1 January 2010 the former municipalities Aue-Fallstein, Berßel, Bühne, Lüttgenrode, Rhoden, Schauen, and Wülperode were merged into Osterwieck. The Verwaltungsgemeinschaft Osterwieck-Fallstein was disbanded at the same time.

== Politics ==
Seats in the town's council (Stadtrat) as of 2014 local elections:

- Christian Democratic Union of Germany (CDU): 6
- Social Democratic Party of Germany (SPD): 2
- Alliance 90/The Greens: 1
- Independent: 20

== International relations ==
Osterwieck is twinned with:

- Hornburg, Germany
- Ardouval, Les Grandes-Ventes, Lisses and Saint-Hellier in the Seine-Maritime département, France

== Notable people ==
- Johann Georg Hermann Voigt (1769–1811), cellist and composer
- Winfried Freudenberg (1956–1989), last victim of the Berlin Wall, was born in Osterwieck
