= Henry Julius, Duke of Brunswick-Lüneburg =

Duke of Brunswick-Wolfenbüttel

Henry Julius
- Duke of Brunswick-Lüneburg
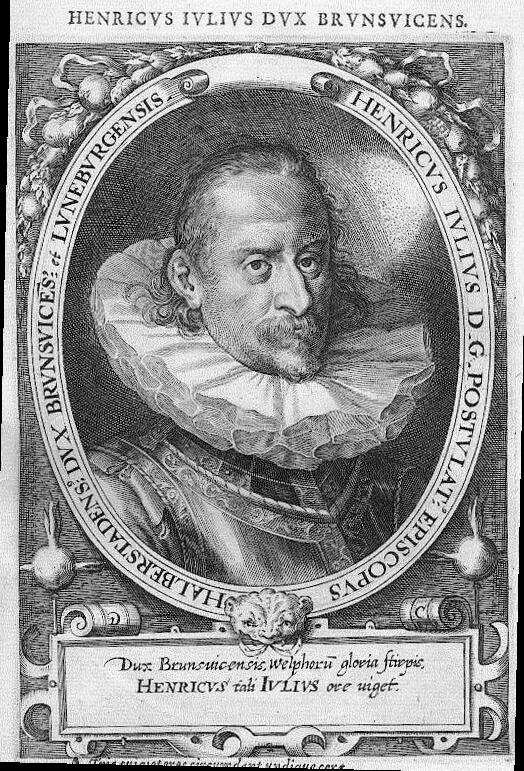
- Duke Henry Julius of Brunswick, engraving by Dominicus Custos, c. 1600

Prince of Brunswick-Wolfenbüttel
- Reign: 3 May 1589 – 30 July 1613
- Predecessor: Julius
- Successor: Frederick Ulrich
- Born: 15 October 1564; Hessen, Brunswick-Lüneburg
- Died: 30 July 1613 (aged 48); Prague, Bohemia
- Spouse: Dorothea of Saxony (m. 1585; died 1587) Elizabeth of Denmark (m. 1590)
- Issue: Dorothea, Princess of Anhalt-Zerbst; Frederick Ulrich, Duke of Brunswick-Wolfenbüttel; Sophia, Princess of Nassau-Dietz; Elisabeth, Duchess of Saxe-Altenburg; Hedwig, Duchess of Pomerania; Dorothea of Brunswick-Wolfenbüttel, Margravine of Brandenburg; Heinrich Julius of Brunswick-Wolfenbüttel; Christian the Younger of Brunswick; Rudolph of Brunswick-Wolfenbüttel; Heinrich Karl of Brunswick-Wolfenbüttel; Anna Augusta, Countess of Nassau-Dillenburg
- House: Welf
- Father: Julius, Duke of Brunswick-Lüneburg
- Mother: Hedwig of Brandenburg
- Religion: Lutheran

Henry Julius (German: Heinrich Julius; 15 October 1564 – 30 July 1613), a member of the House of Welf, was Duke of Brunswick-Lüneburg and ruling Prince of Brunswick-Wolfenbüttel from 1589 until his death. He also served as administrator of the Prince-Bishopric of Halberstadt from 1566 and of the Prince-Bishopric of Minden between 1582 and 1585.

== Biography ==
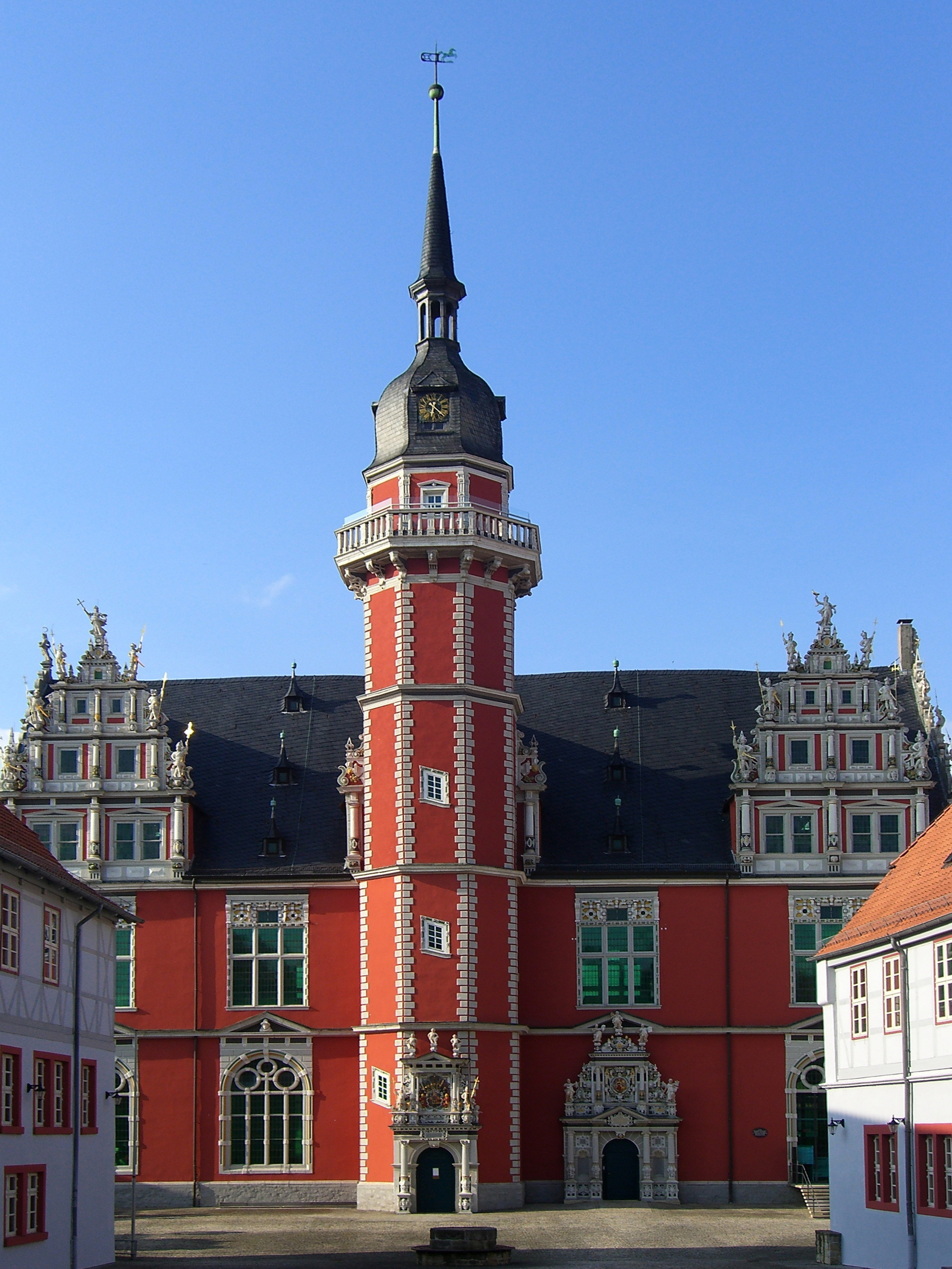
Juleum Novum, Helmstedt

=== Early life ===
Henry Julius was born in Hessen am Fallstein as the eldest son of Duke Julius of Brunswick-Lüneburg (1528–1589) and his wife Hedwig of Brandenburg (1540–1602), at the time when the Principality of Brunswick-Wolfenbüttel was still under the rule of his grandfather Duke Henry V. Already in 1566, at the age of two, he was elected Lutheran administrator of the Halberstadt bishopric by the cathedral chapter; however, a condition of his election was an agreement that the cathedral chapter would lead the prince-bishopric under its own authority until Henry Julius reached the age of 14.

His father implemented the Protestant Reformation in the Wolfenbüttel lands upon his accession in 1568. In 1576 he appointed Henry Julius first rector of the newly established Protestant University of Helmstedt. Even though he was only twelve years old, Henry Julius participated in theological debates among the faculty that were held in Latin. After finishing his study in law, he was employed by his father as a court judge. When he came of age, he was rated one of the most educated princes of his time.

=== Career ===
Henry Julius took over administration of the Halbertstadt prince-bishopric in 1578, he became active as a temporal as well as spiritual ruler. He improved general education in the episcopal lands, and completed the implementation of the Protestant Reformation begun by his father, although he allowed Catholic office holders to keep their privileges — except that he strictly prohibited priests from having mistresses. In view of his moderate policies, he also was offered the position of an administrator of the Minden prince-bishopric and was elected by the cathedral chapter in 1582. Nevertheless, expectations were disappointed, when Henry Julius ordered that all sermons ought to be preached according to the Augsburg Confession. When he resigned from office three years later, to marry the Wettin princess Dorothea of Saxony, he left a virtual Lutheran diocese.

In 1589, when Henry Julius succeeded his father as ruler of Brunswick-Wolfenbüttel, he replaced Saxon by Roman Law, and instead of local nobles, lawyers with academic degrees now served as judges. He was also versed in architecture and began to rebuild his Wolfenbüttel residence in a lavish Weser Renaissance style, including the construction of the Protestant Beatae Mariae Virginis main church which started in 1608. He also had had extended barracks, walls and fortifications laid out around the city. He invited Hans Vredeman de Vries to develop ramparts and had a canal built through a swampland between Hornburg and Oschersleben. One of the most important buildings erected under his rule was the Juleum Novum, the main lecture hall of the Helmstedt university. However, he lost control of the state's finances and amassed large amounts of public debt. When the rights of the nobles were reduced, the local nobles sued Henry Julius at the Reichskammergericht (Imperial Court) in Speyer. A compromise was struck in 1601.

=== Politics ===
Though a Protestant prince, Henry Julius became a close advisor to the Habsburg emperor Rudolf II. From 1600 onwards he stayed at the emperor's court at Prague Castle several times. He gained Rudolf's confidence, and was named Geheimrat and his "chief director" in 1607. This position gave him much influence in Imperial affairs. He also managed to resolve the conflict between Rudolf and his brother, Matthias and assisted in temporarily resolving the differences between Catholic and Protestant estates in the Kingdom of Bohemia.

A serious conflict occurred between Henry Julius and the Brunswick citizens, when they refused to recognize his overlordship. Henry Julius was not willing to confirm the city's traditional privileges and had mercenary (Landsknecht) troops deployed, leading to a civil war in 1605. Attempts by King Christian IV of Denmark to mediate failed and in 1606, Emperor Rudolf II banned the city. In 1607, Henry Julius again went to the emperor's court, in order to negotiate the details of the ban. In return, he was given the emperor's full support in dealing with the Brunswick insurgents. Nevertheless, all attacks on the city failed.

Under the rule of Henry Julius, the persecution of Jews and witches reached a historic peak. Early in his career he expelled the Jews from his state. He was also a committed burner of witches; one contemporary chronicler wrote that Lechelnholze Square looked like a little forest, so crowded were the stakes.

=== Support for the arts ===
The duke was a dedicated patron of theatre and music. In the years 1593 and 1594, he wrote eleven plays, in which he wrote about the moral duty of princes to burn witches. He invited Robert Browne, Thomas Sackville and their theatre company, who staged a shortened version of his "Susanna" for several years. His other plays, five comedies, four tragedies, were not very successful; however, one was a basis for the tall tales of Baron Munchausen. In 1594, Duke Henry Julius invited John Dowland as court lutenist, and to meet Michael Praetorius, his Kapellmeister, organist and composer.

When Emperor Rudolf died in 1612, Duke Henry Julius returned to the Prague court to consult his successor, Matthias. On 20 July 1613 he died in Prague, possibly of alcohol abuse. He was buried in the Marienkirche at Wolfenbüttel.

== Marriage and family ==
Henry married first Dorothea of Saxony (4 October 1563 – 13 February 1587), daughter of Augustus, Elector of Saxony, on 26 September 1585. They had one child together:

- Dorothea Hedwig of Brunswick-Wolfenbüttel (13 February 1587 – 16 October 1609), married Rudolph, Prince of Anhalt-Zerbst, died in childbirth like her mother before her.

Henry married second Elizabeth of Denmark (25 August 1573 – 19 June 1626), daughter of King Frederick II of Denmark on 19 April 1590. They had ten children together:

- Frederick Ulrich (15 April 1591 – 21 August 1634)
- Sophia Hedwig (20 February 1592 – 23 January 1642), married Ernest Casimir, Prince of Nassau-Dietz
- Elisabeth (23 June 1593 – 25 March 1650), married Augustus, administrator of the diocese of Naumburg, and John Philip, Duke of Saxe-Altenburg
- Hedwig (19 February 1595 – 26 June 1650), married Ulrich, Duke of Pomerania
- Dorothea (8 July 1596 – 1 September 1643), married Christian William of Brandenburg, son of Joachim III Frederick, Elector of Brandenburg
- Henry Julius (7 October 1597 – 11 July 1606) died young.
- Christian (1599–1626)
- Rudolph (15 June 1602 – 13 June 1616) died young.
- Henry Charles (4 September 1609 – 11 June 1615) died in childhood.
- Anna Augusta (19 May 1612 – 17 February 1673), married George Louis, Prince of Nassau-Dillenburg

Henry Julius, Duke of Brunswick-Lüneburg House of Welf Cadet branch of the House of Este Born: 15 October 1564 Died: 30 July 1613
Regnal titles
Religious titles
Preceded by Sigismund II	Administrator of the Prince-Bishopric of Halberstadt; 1578–1613	Succeeded by Henry Charles
Preceded by Hermann of Schauenburg	Administrator of the Prince-Bishopric of Minden; 1582–1585	Vacant Title next held by Anthony of Schauenberg
Regnal titles
Preceded by Julius	Duke of Brunswick-Lüneburg; Prince of Calenberg and Prince of Wolfenbüttel; 1589–1613	Succeeded by Frederick Ulrich
Preceded by Philip the Younger	Duke of Brunswick-Lüneburg; Prince of Grubenhagen only de facto, not de jure 1596–1613	Succeeded by Frederick Ulrich
