= Tara Nummedal =

American historian

- Spouse: Seth Rockman
- Awards: Guggenheim Fellowship (2009)

Academic background
- Education: Pomona College (BA); University of California, Davis (MA); Stanford University (PhD)

Academic work
- Discipline: European history
- Sub-discipline: History of science
- Institutions: Brown University

Tara E. Nummedal is a professor of history and Italian studies at Brown University, where she holds the John Nickoll Provost’s Professorship in History. Nummedal is known for her works on Anna Maria Zieglerin and the history of alchemy and natural science in early modern Europe.

== Biography ==
Nummedal is originally from Seal Beach, California, and is a 1992 graduate of Pomona College. After earning a master's degree at the University of California, Davis in 1996, she completed her Ph.D. at Stanford University in 2001.

She joined the Brown University faculty in 2002. Her husband, Seth Rockman, is also a historian at Brown University.

== Publications ==
=== Books ===
- Alchemy and Authority in the Holy Roman Empire (University of Chicago Press, 2007)
- Anna Zieglerin and the Lion’s Blood: Alchemy and End Times in Reformation Germany (University of Pennsylvania Press, 2019)
- John Abbot and William Swainson: Art, Science, and Commerce in 19th-Century Natural History Illustration (with Janice Neri and John V. Calhoun, University of Alabama Press, 2019).

=== Editor ===
With Donna Bilak, she is also the editor of a critical edition of Atalanta Fugiens by Michael Maier, Furnace and Fugue: A Digital Edition of Michael Maier's Atalanta fugiens with Scholarly Commentary (University of Virginia Press, 2020).

== Recognition ==
Nummedal was named a Guggenheim Fellow in 2009.
