= Maria of Brunswick-Lüneburg =

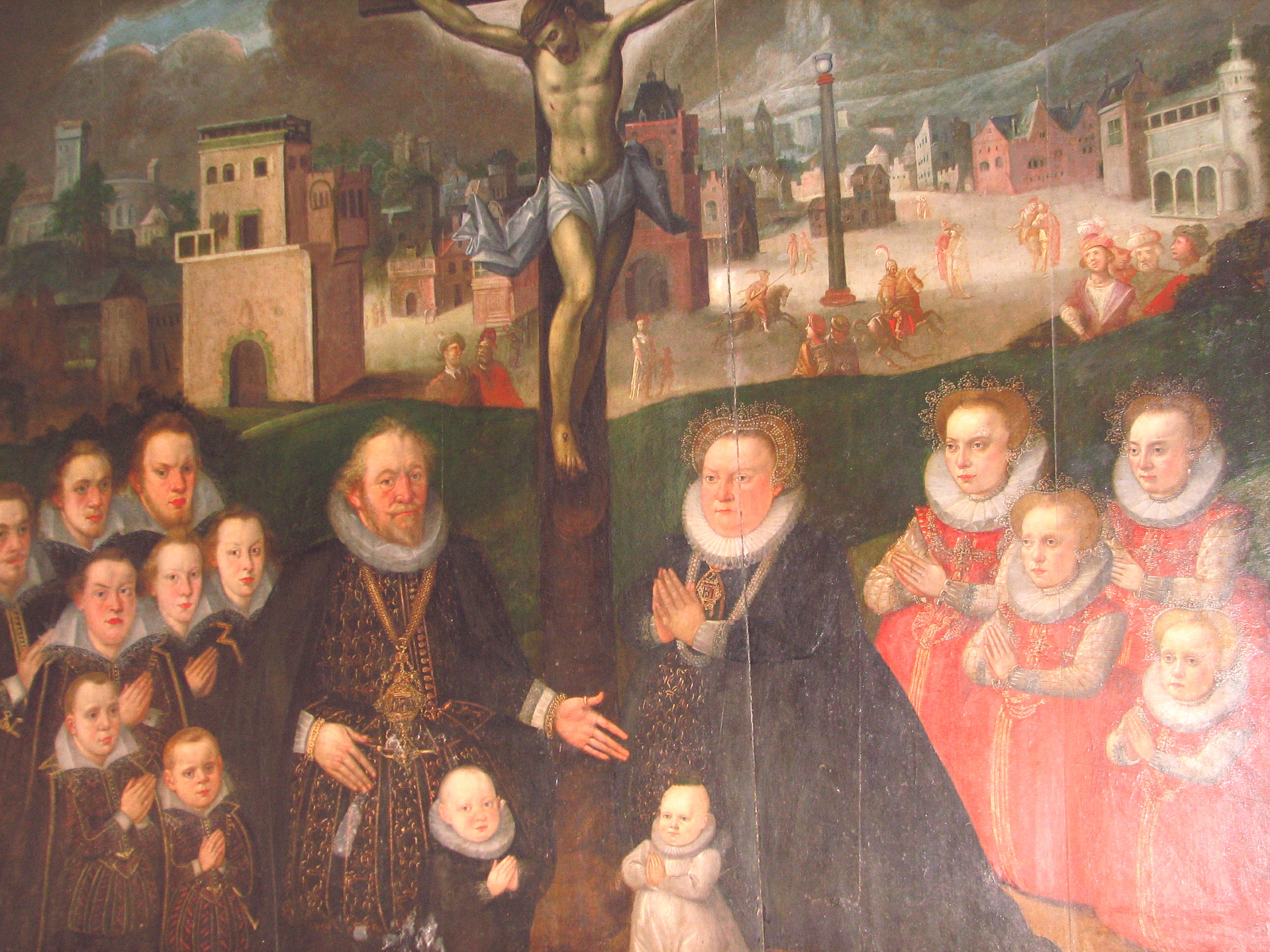
- Portrait of Francis II of Saxe-Lauenburg with his wife Maria and their family in St. Mary's Church in Büchen
- Born: 13 January 1566; Schladen
- Died: 13 August 1626 (aged 60); Lauenburg
- Noble family: House of Guelph
- Spouse: Francis II, Duke of Saxe-Lauenburg
- Issue more....: Francis Julius; Francis Charles; Francis Henry
- Father: Julius, Duke of Brunswick-Wolfenbüttel
- Mother: Hedwig of Brandenburg

Maria of Brunswick-Wolfenbüttel (13 January 1566 – 13 August 1626) was a princess of Brunswick-Wolfenbüttel by birth and by marriage Duchess of Saxe-Lauenburg.

== Life ==
Mary was born in Schladen, a daughter of the Duke Julius of Brunswick-Wolfenbüttel (1528–1589) from his marriage to Hedwig (1540–1602), daughter of the Elector Joachim II of Brandenburg.

She married on 10 November 1582 at Wolfenbüttel with Duke Francis II of Saxe-Lauenburg (1547–1619). She was his second wife. She was given Franzhagen Castle as her wittum; she created a Meierhof and a court church there.

Maria died in Lauenburg in 1626 and was buried alongside her husband in the ducal family crypt in the Mary Magdalene Church in Lauenburg.

== Issue ==
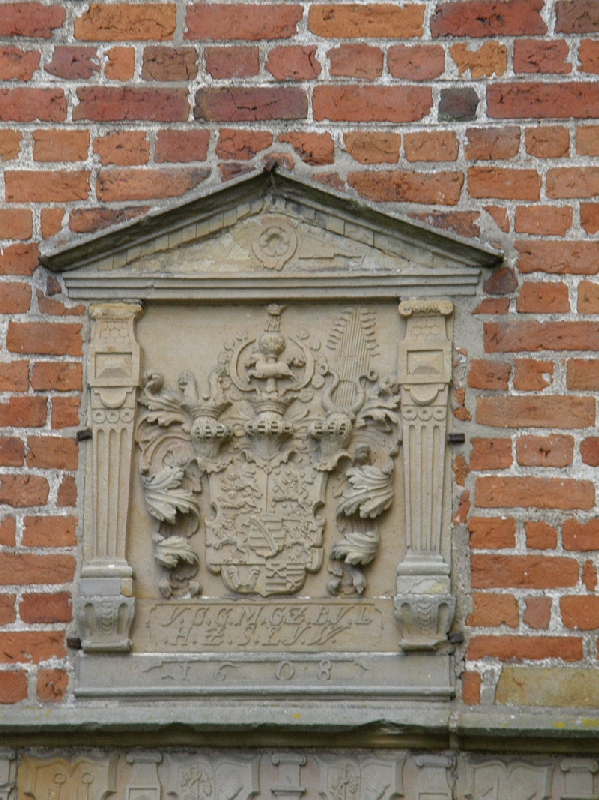
Maria's coat-of-arms as of 1608 on St. Jacobi Church in Cuxhaven. Abbreviated inscription: V.[on] G.[ottes] G.[naden] M.[arie] G.[eborene] Z.[u] B.[raunschweig] U.[nd] L.[üneburg] – 2nd line – H.[erzogin] Z.[u] S.[achsen,] E.[ngern] V.[nd] W.[estfalen] (trl. Of God's Grace Mary née of Brunswick and Lunenburg – 2nd line – Duchess of Saxony, Angria and Westphalia).

Maria and Francis had 14 children, of whom the following 12 reached adulthood:

- Francis Julius of Saxony, Angria and Westphalia (13 September 1584 – 8 October 1634, Vienna), ∞ on 14 May 1620 Agnes of Württemberg (Stuttgart, 7 May 1592 – 25 November 1629, ibidem), daughter of Duke Frederick I
- Julius Henry of Saxony, Angria and Westphalia (Lauenburg) (Wolfenbüttel, 9 April 1586 – 20 November 1665, Prague), duke of Saxe-Lauenburg between 1656 and 1665
- Ernest Louis of Saxony, Angria and Westphalia (7 June 1587 – 15 July 1620, Aschau)
- Hedwig Sibylla of Saxony, Angria and Westphalia (15 October 1588 – 4 June 1635)
- Juliana of Saxony, Angria and Westphalia (26 December 1589 – 1 December 1630, Norburg), ∞ on 1 August 1627 Friedrich of Schleswig-Holstein-Nordborg (26 October 1581 – 22 July 1658), son of John II, Duke of Schleswig-Holstein-Sonderburg
- Joachim Sigismund of Saxony, Angria and Westphalia (31 May 1593 – 10 April 1629)
- Francis Charles of Saxony, Angria and Westphalia (2 May 1594 – 30 November 1660, Neuhaus), ∞ in Barth on 19 September 1628 (1) Agnes of Brandenburg (Berlin, 27 July 1584 – 16 March 1629, Neuhaus), daughter of Elector John George; ∞ in Ödenburg on 27 August 1639 (2) Catherine of Brandenburg (Königsberg, 28 May 1602 – 9 February 1649, Schöningen), daughter of Elector John Sigismund
- Rudolph Maximilian of Saxony, Angria and Westphalia (18 June 1596 – 1 October 1647, Lübeck); ∞ Anna Caterina de Dulcina
- Hedwig Maria of Saxony, Angria and Westphalia (7 August 1597 – 29 August 1644), ∞ in 1636 Prince Annibale Gonzaga of Bozzolo (1602 – 2 August 1668)
- Francis Albert of Saxony, Angria and Westphalia (31 October 1598 – 10 June 1642, Schweidnitz); ∞ on 21 February 1640 in Güstrow Christina Margaret of Mecklenburg-Güstrow (Güstrow, 31 March 1615 – 6 August 1666, Wolfenbüttel), daughter of John Albert II, Duke of Mecklenburg
- Sophia Hedwig of Saxony, Angria and Westphalia (Lauenburg upon Elbe, 24 May 1601 – 21 February 1660, Glücksburg); ∞ on 23 May 1624 in Neuhaus Philip, Duke of Schleswig-Holstein-Sonderburg-Glücksburg (15 March 1584 – 27 September 1663), son of John II, Duke of Schleswig-Holstein-Sonderburg
- Francis Henry of Saxony, Angria and Westphalia (9 April 1604 – 26 November 1658), ∞ on 13 December 1637 in Treptow an der Rega Countess Maria Juliana of Nassau-Siegen (Siegen, 14 August 1612 – 21 January 1665, Franzhagen Castle near Schulendorf), daughter of John VII, Count of Nassau-Siegen
