= Hedwig of Brunswick-Wolfenbüttel =

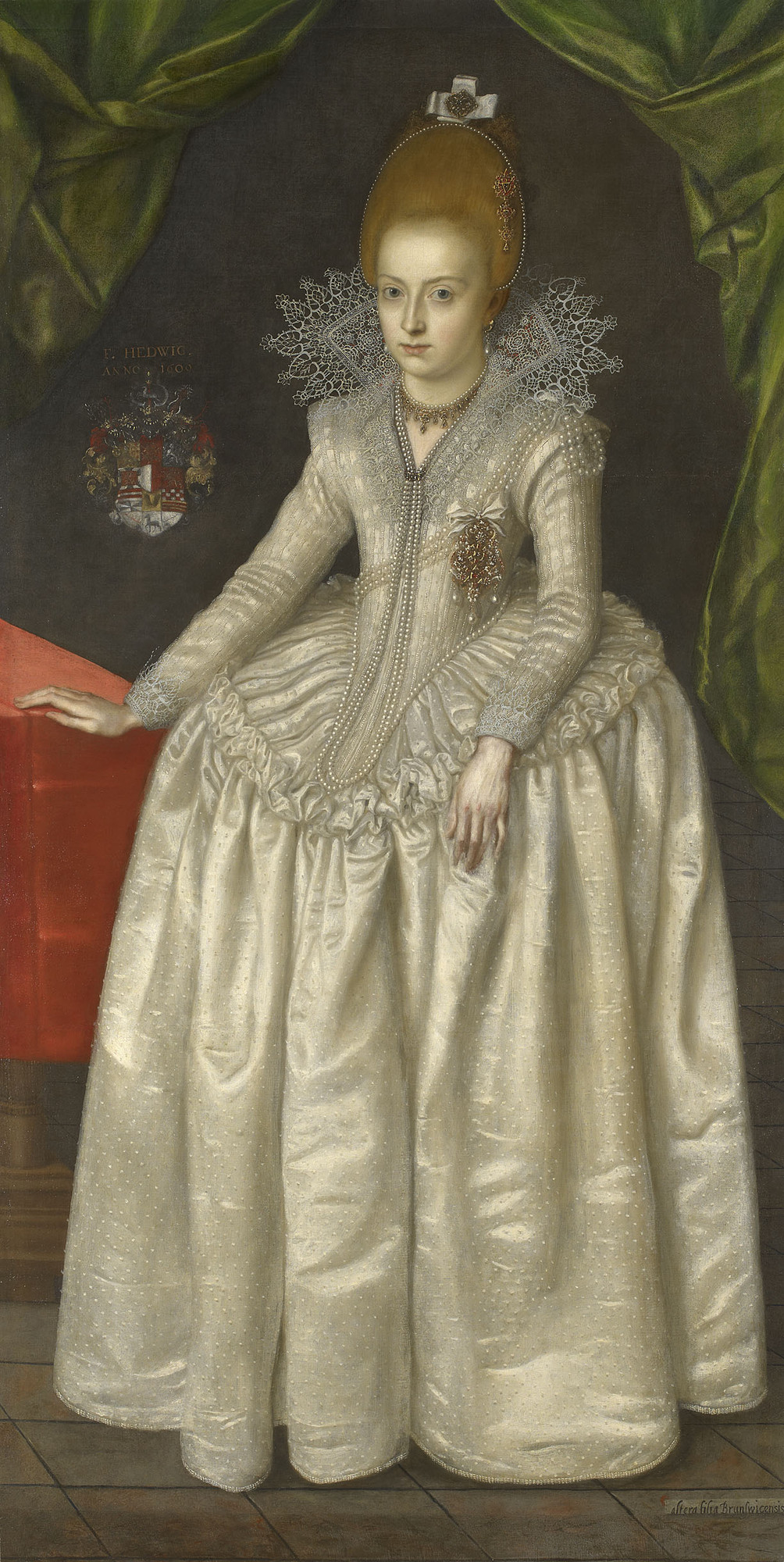
- Hedwig of Brunswick-Wolfenbüttel, Duchess of Pomerania
- Born: 9 February 1595; Wolfenbüttel
- Died: 26 June 1650 (aged 55); Szczecinek
- Burial: Rügenwalde
- Spouse: Ulrich, Duke of Pomerania
- House: Guelph
- Father: Henry Julius, Duke of Brunswick-Wolfenbüttel
- Mother: Elisabeth of Denmark

Hedwig of Brunswick-Wolfenbüttel (9 February 1595 in Wolfenbüttel – 26 June 1650 in Szczecinek), was a princess of Brunswick-Wolfenbüttel by birth and the Duchess of Pomerania by marriage.

== Life ==
Hedwig was a daughter of Henry Julius, Duke of Brunswick-Lüneburg (1564–1613) from his second marriage with Elisabeth of Denmark, the eldest daughter of King Frederick II of Denmark. Hedwig was a sister of Christian the Younger of Brunswick, "the mad Bishop of Halberstadt".

Hedwig married on 7 February 1619 in Wolfenbüttel to Ulrich, Duke of Pomerania (1589–1622), Bishop of Cammin. The wedding feast was very costly; it was attended by 16 ruling princes. The marriage lasted only three years and remained childless. Ulrich died at the age of 33 as a result of his heavy drinking. Among the Duchess's entourage was Christopher of Hoym, who would later become Marshal of the last Duke of Pomerania, Bogislaw XIV.

After her husband's death, she moved to her widow seat in Szczecinek, where she lived in the castle for another 28 years. She retained the elaborate court she had grown used to in Wolfenbüttel and Cammin. In 1649, het household numbered 65 people. She wore mourning clothes for the rest of her life, and devoted herself to charity. She organized the poor relief and made considerable donations to the local church.

Hedwig was described as brave, beautiful and wise. She was a talented lute player and hymn author. She probably wrote the well-known Auf, Zion auf, Tochter säume nicht. During her lifetime, almost all of her siblings died, the House of Griffins died out (the last Duke had supported her financially) and during the Thirty Years' War both Swedish and Imperial troops ravaged and confiscated her territory. Her complaints to her cousins King Christian IV of Denmark and Queen Christina of Sweden were unsuccessful. In 1630, she fled to Bobolice to evade the plague. In 1631, she appointed Gregor Lagus, who was Rector of the Latin school at Kołobrzeg as provost in Szczecinek, despite opposition from Duke Bogislaw XIV. Lagus became her leading co-author of a book on Evangelical education. In 1640, she founded a school, which was later named after her: the "Princess Hedwig School". She left her money to a foundation, on the condition that the school continued to exist in Szczecinek, which made later attempts to move the school to another town impossible.

In 1642, Hedwig was wounded during a raid by the Polish noblemen Bartholomew Tarno from Strączno, Pipilowski from Czarnków and voivode Melchior Weiher of Chełmno. The attempt to take her hostage was probably related to her negotiations to receive an inheritance to supplement her dwindling revenues. In her last will she named Elector Frederick William of Brandenburg as her heir.

Hedwig died of smallpox in 1650, at the age of 56. She was finally buried in the Pomeranian ducal crypt in Rügenwalde in 1654.
