= Seth Rockman =

American historian

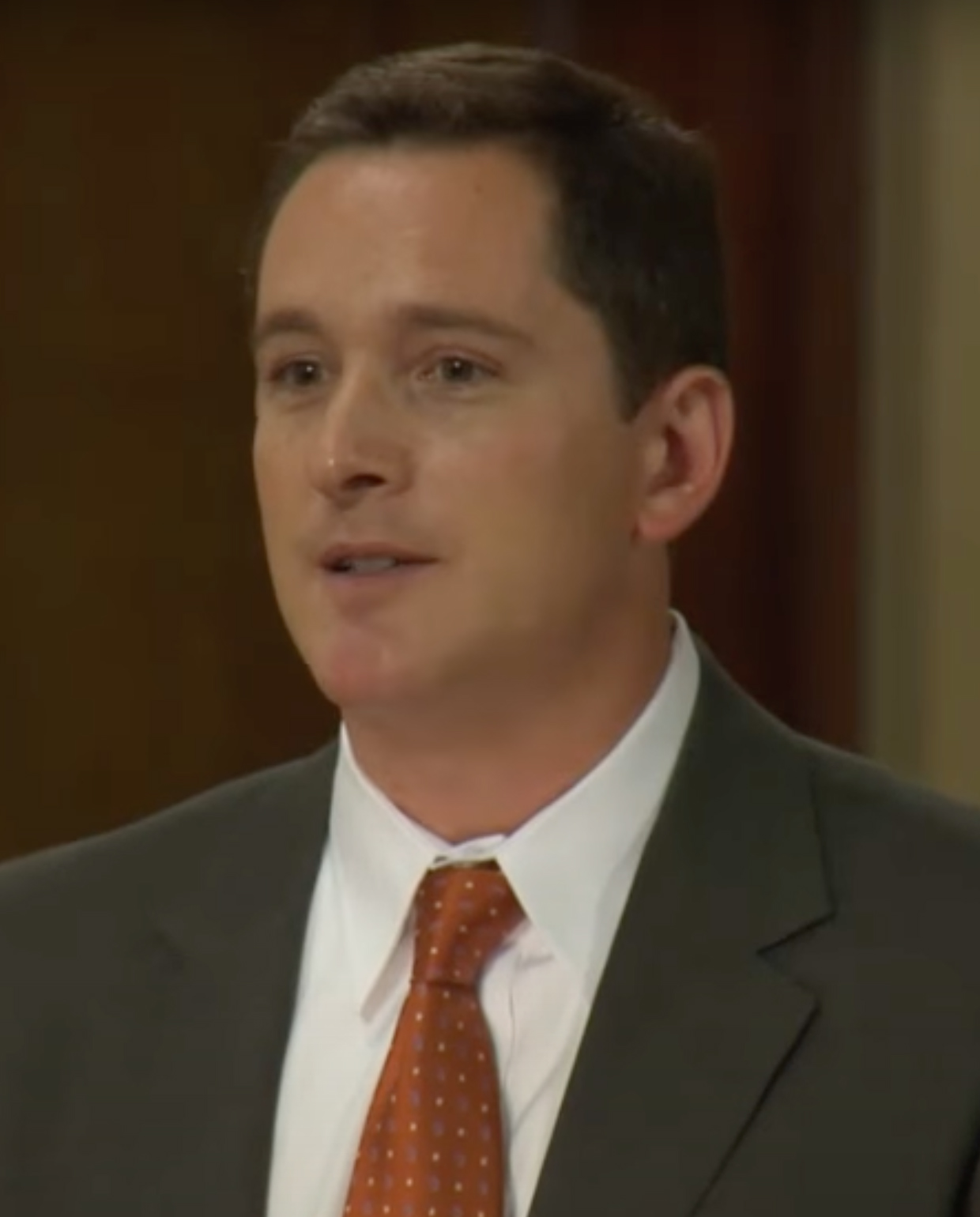
- Rockman in 2012
- Spouse: Tara Nummedal
- Awards: Merle Curti Award (2010); Philip Taft Labor History Book Award (2010)

Academic background
- Education: Columbia University (BA); University of California, Davis (PhD)

Academic work
- Discipline: American history
- Sub-discipline: History of slavery
- Institutions: Occidental College; Brown University

Seth Rockman is an American historian. He is an associate professor of history at Brown University. He is the recipient of the Merle Curti Award and the Philip Taft Labor History Book Award for his 2009 book Scraping By: Wage Labor, Slavery, and Survival in Early Baltimore. He is also the recipient of the 2025 Philip Taft Labor History Book Award for his book Plantation Goods: A Material History of American Slavery.

== Biography ==
Rockman was born in Indiana and raised in San Francisco. He received his B.A. from Columbia University and his Ph.D. from the University of California, Davis. He taught at Occidental College before joining the Brown University faculty in 2004. His scholarship has focused on the history of slavery and capitalism in the United States.

In 2010, Rockman was the co-winner of the Merle Curti Award from the Organization of American Historians. He also received the 2010 Philip Taft Labor History Book Award from the Cornell University ILR School.

In 2016, he co-edited Slavery's Capitalism: A New History of American Economic Development with Sven Beckert, published by the University of Pennsylvania Press.

== Personal life ==
Rockman is married to fellow Brown historian Tara Nummedal.

== Bibliography ==
- Scraping By: Wage Labor, Slavery, and Survival in Early Baltimore. Johns Hopkins University Press, 2009.
- Slavery's Capitalism: A New History of American Economic Development (editor, with Sven Beckert). University of Pennsylvania Press, 2016.
- Plantation Goods: A Material History of American Slavery. University of Chicago Press, 2024.
