= Schauen =

Place in Saxony-Anhalt, Germany

- Stadtteil of Osterwieck
- Interactive map of Schauen
- Location within Germany Location within Saxony-Anhalt
- Coordinates: 51°56′46″N 10°43′0″E
- Country: Germany
- State: Saxony-Anhalt
- District: Harz
- Town: Osterwieck

Area
  - Total: 11.01 km^{2} (4.25 sq mi)
- Elevation: 148 m (486 ft)

Population (2006-12-31)
  - Total: 501
  - Density: 45.5/km^{2} (118/sq mi)
- Time zone: UTC+01:00 (CET)
  - Summer (DST): UTC+02:00 (CEST)
- Postal codes: 38835
- Dialling codes: 039421

Schauen is a village and a former municipality in the district of Harz, in Saxony-Anhalt, Germany.

Since 1 January 2010, it is part of the town Osterwieck.
