= Hessen (Osterwieck) =

- Stadtteil of Osterwieck
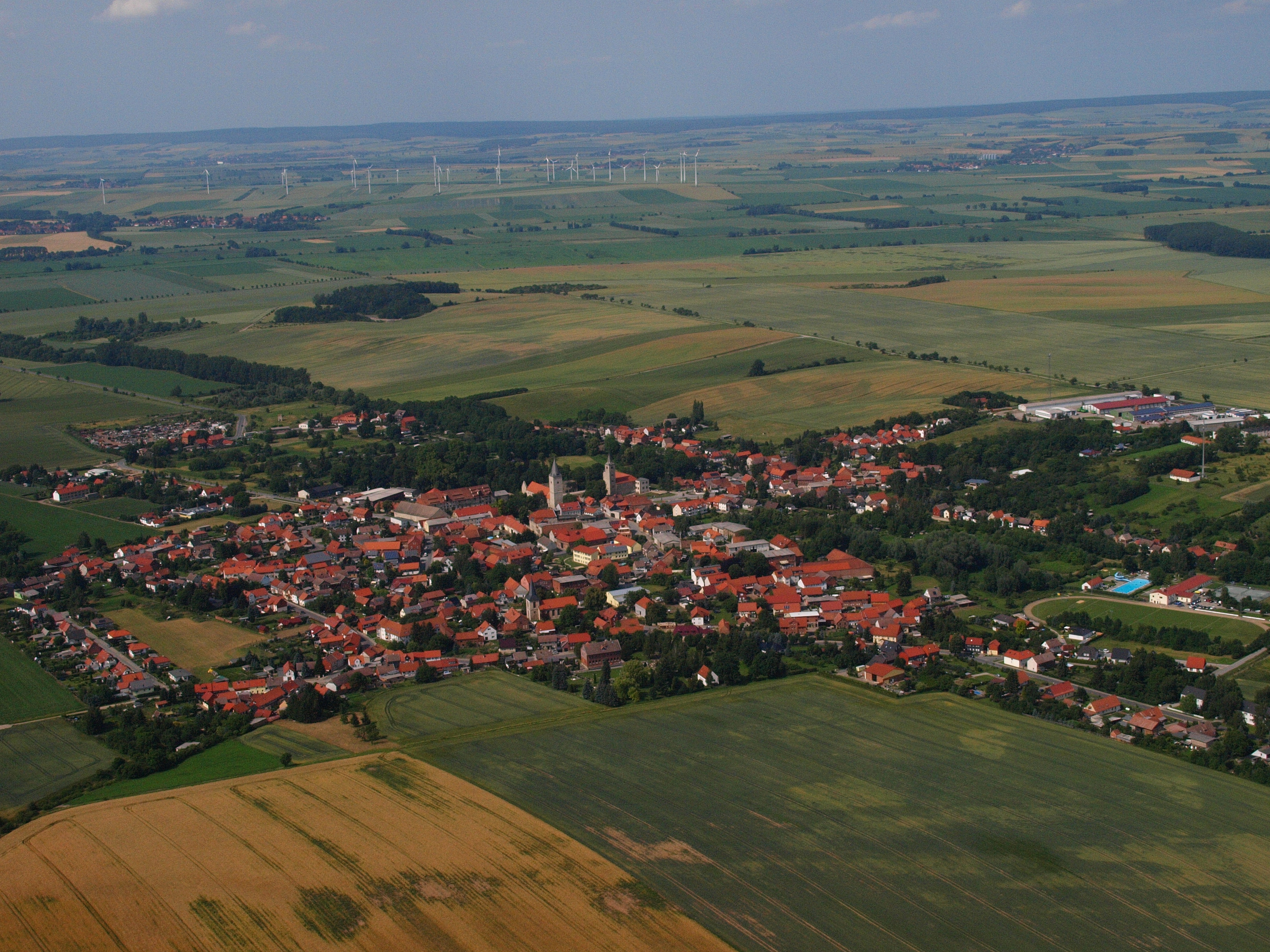
- Interactive map of Hessen
- Location within Germany Location within Saxony-Anhalt
- Coordinates: 52°1′N 10°47′E
- Country: Germany
- State: Saxony-Anhalt
- District: Harz
- Town: Osterwieck
- Time zone: UTC+01:00 (CET)
  - Summer (DST): UTC+02:00 (CEST)
- Vehicle registration: HZ
- Website: www.fallstein.com

Hessen, also Hessen am Fallstein, is a village in the Harz district of Saxony-Anhalt, Germany. Formerly part of the Aue-Fallstein municipal association, it was merged into the Osterwieck municipality on 1 January 2010.

== Geography ==
The settlement is situated in the northern Harz foothills, south of the Großes Bruch lowland, at the northeastern rim of the Großer Fallstein heights. Located about 24 km (15 mi) northwest of Halberstadt, about half-way on the road to Wolfenbüttel, it borders on Winnigstedt-Mattierzoll, Lower Saxony in the north.

== History ==
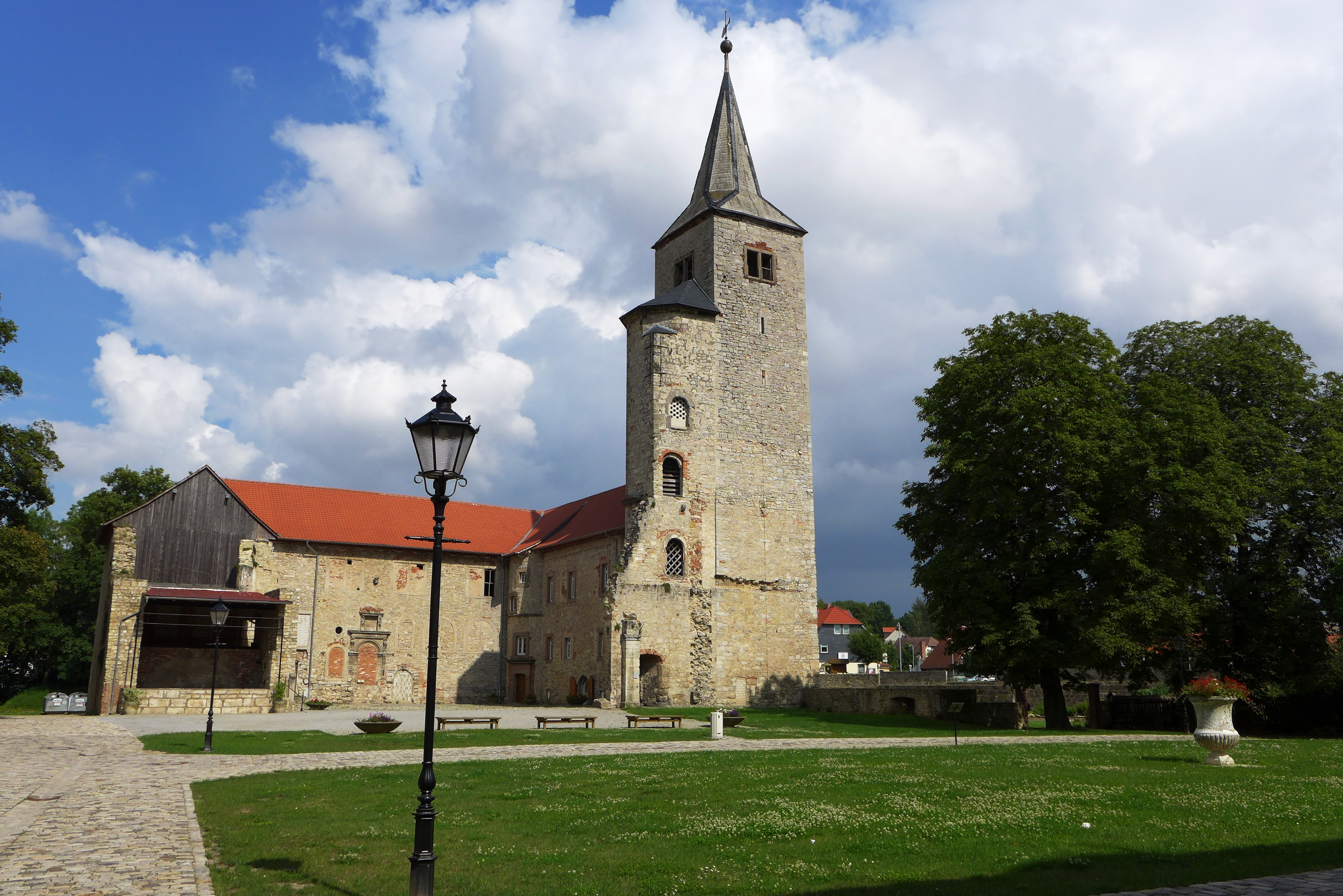
Hessen Castle

Possibly named after a local chieftain during the Saxon Wars of Charlemagne, a water manor house at the site was first mentioned in an 1129 deed. Temporarily held by the comital House of Regenstein from 1330 onwards, it was rebuilt as a castle named Schloss Hessen (de), while the surrounding village arose in the 14th century.

The estates were acquired by the Welf dukes of Brunswick-Lüneburg in 1343, then an exclave within the territory of the Prince-Bishops of Halberstadt on the trade route to Leipzig. Hessen became the residence of the Wolfenbüttel crown prince Julius in 1560; his son Henry Julius was born here in 1564. Large parts of the castle were rebuilt in a Renaissance style with extended parks and gardens. Julius' widow, Hedwig of Brandenburg resided here until her death in 1602. Duke Henry Julius had an organ built for the Hessen castle chapel, finished in 1610, which his widow Elizabeth of Denmark donated to Frederiksborg Castle in 1617. Elizabeth likewise lived in Hessen until her death in 1626.

During the Thirty Years' War, the village was plundered by both Imperial troops under Count Gottfried Heinrich zu Pappenheim in 1628 and Swedish forces in 1641. After the war, the Brunswick dukes used Hessen castle only sporadically as a hunting lodge. The decayed building had to be restored by the ducal master builder Hermann Korb from 1726 onwards. By 1790, it served as the centre of a Brunswick demesne.

After World War II, Hessen fell to the Soviet occupation zone and became part of East Germany in 1949. Located near the inner-German border, the neglected castle complex fell into ruins and parts were demolished in the 1950 and 1970s. The remnants were secured and renovated since the Peaceful Revolution of 1989.
