= Hedwig of Brandenburg, Duchess of Brunswick-Wolfenbüttel =

Hedwig of Brandenburg
- Duchess of Brunswick-Lüneburg
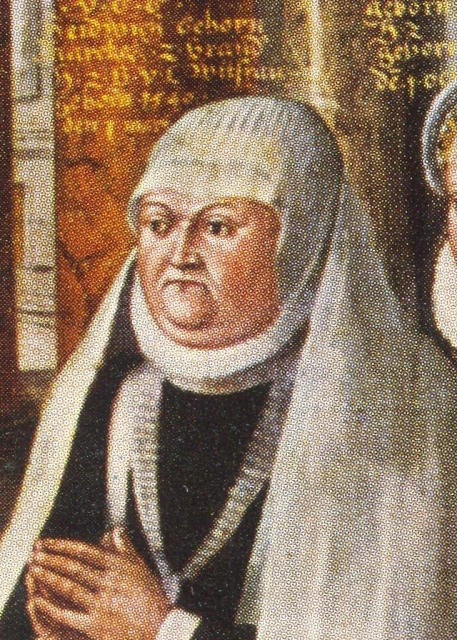
- Hedwig of Brandenburg, Duchess of Brunswick-Wolfenbüttel, detail of a family portrait
- Born: 23 February 1540; Cölln, Brandenburg
- Died: 21 October 1602 (aged 62); Wolfenbüttel, Brunswick-Lüneburg
- Noble family: House of Hohenzollern
- Spouse: Julius, Duke of Brunswick-Lüneburg
- Issue: Sophie Hedwig; Henry Julius; Maria; Elisabeth; Philip Sigismund; Joachim Charles; Dorothea Augusta; Julius Augustus; Hedwig
- Father: Joachim II Hector, Elector of Brandenburg
- Mother: Hedwig Jagiellon

Hedwig of Brandenburg (23 February 1540 – 21 October 1602), a member of the Hohenzollern dynasty, was Duchess of Brunswick-Lüneburg and Princess of Brunswick-Wolfenbüttel from 1568 to 1589, by her marriage with the Welf duke Julius.

== Life ==
Born at the City Palace in Cölln (today part of Berlin), Hedwig was a younger daughter of Elector Joachim II Hector of Brandenburg (1505–1571) from his second marriage with Hedwig Jagiellon (1513–1573), a daughter of King Sigismund I of Poland. Her elder sister Elizabeth Magdalena was married to Duke Francis Otto of Brunswick-Lüneburg in 1559; however, her husband died in the same year.

One year later, on 25 February 1560, Hedwig was married in Cölln on the Spree river to the Welf prince Julius of Brunswick-Lüneburg (1528–1589). Catherine's mother and Sophia Jagellion (stepmother to Julius) were sisters.

The couple had met at the Küstrin court of Margrave John of Brandenburg, where Julius had fled in 1558 from his father, Duke Henry V. His two older brothers having died at Battle of Sievershausen, Julius had suddenly become the new heir - but he was disliked by his father for his intellectual pursuits, lack of interest in riding and hunting and for his adherence to Protestantism. This all came to a head in Easter 1558, when Julius refused to attend Catholic mass. This meant a final break with his father. He was able to avoid arrest by fleeing.

There was also the fact that his father had remarried to Sophia Jagiellon, and with the possibility of his father having another son to replace him, Julius, fearing for his life, quickly left his father's court.

After Julius had reconciled with his father, who had agreed only reluctantly to the marriage of his son with a Protestant princess, the couple received the castles of Hessen and Schladen as residences. Duke Henry V was alleged to have appeared at Hessen Castle and let himself into the room of his daughter-in-law, took her newborn son Henry Julius from the cradle and exclaimed: You'll now have to be my beloved son!

In 1568, Julius succeeded his father as ruling Prince of Brunswick-Wolfenbüttel. He turned out to be a capable ruler; nevertheless, he later came under the fraudulent influence of the alchemists Philipp Sömmering and Anne Marie Schombach (nicknamed Schlüter-Liese), whom he received at the Wolfenbüttel court in 1571, and gradually estranged from his wife.

Hedwig was described as pious and humble, with preference for domestic activities. In 1598, the theologician Stephan Prätorius dedicated his book Der Witwen Trost ("The Widow's Consolation") to Hedwig.

== Issue ==
From her marriage to Julius, Hedwig had the following children:

- Sophie Hedwig (1561–1631)

married in 1577 Duke Ernest Louis of Pomerania-Wolgast (1545-1592)

- Henry Julius (1564–1613), Duke of Brunswick-Wolfenbüttel, married:
  1. in 1585, Princess Dorothea of Saxony (1563–1587)
  2. in 1590, Princess Elizabeth of Denmark (1573–1625)
- Maria (1566–1626)

married in 1582, Duke Francis II of Saxe-Lauenburg (1547-1619)

- Elisabeth (1567–1618), married
  1. in 1583 to Count Adolf XI of Holstein-Schauenburg (d. 1601)
  2. in 1604 to Duke Christopher of Brunswick-Harburg (d. 1606)
- Philip Sigismund (1568–1623), Bishop of Osnabrück and Verden
- Margaret (1571–1580)
- Joachim Charles (1573–1615)
- Sabine Catharina (1574–1590)
- Dorothea Augusta (1577–1625), Abbess of Gandersheim
- Julius Augustus (1578–1617), abbot of Michaelstein Abbey
- Hedwig (1580–1657)

married in 1621 Duke Otto III of Brunswick-Harburg (1572-1641)
