= Bühne (Osterwieck) =

- Stadtteil of Osterwieck
- Interactive map of Bühne
- Location within Germany Location within Saxony-Anhalt
- Coordinates: 51°59′N 10°38′E
- Country: Germany
- State: Saxony-Anhalt
- District: Harz
- Town: Osterwieck

Area
  - Total: 11.11 km^{2} (4.29 sq mi)
- Elevation: 135 m (443 ft)

Population (2006-12-31)
  - Total: 558
  - Density: 50.2/km^{2} (130/sq mi)
- Time zone: UTC+01:00 (CET)
  - Summer (DST): UTC+02:00 (CEST)
- Postal codes: 38835
- Dialling codes: 039421

Bühne is a village and a former municipality in the district of Harz, in Saxony-Anhalt, Germany.

Since 1 January 2010, it is part of the town Osterwieck.
