= Berßel =

- Stadtteil of Osterwieck
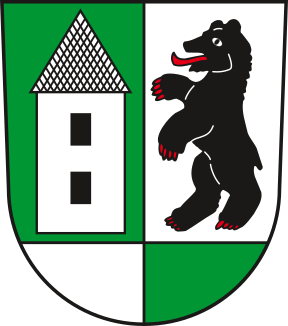
- Coat of arms
- Interactive map of Berßel
- Location within Germany Location within Saxony-Anhalt
- Coordinates: 51°57′20″N 10°45′37″E
- Country: Germany
- State: Saxony-Anhalt
- District: Harz
- Town: Osterwieck

Area
  - Total: 11.85 km^{2} (4.58 sq mi)
- Elevation: 140 m (460 ft)

Population (2006-12-31)
  - Total: 736
  - Density: 62.1/km^{2} (161/sq mi)
- Time zone: UTC+01:00 (CET)
  - Summer (DST): UTC+02:00 (CEST)
- Postal codes: 38835
- Dialling codes: 039421

Berßel is a village and a former municipality in the district of Harz, in Saxony-Anhalt, Germany.

Since 1 January 2010, it is part of the town Osterwieck.
