= Elizabeth of Denmark, Duchess of Brunswick-Wolfenbüttel =

Elisabeth of Denmark
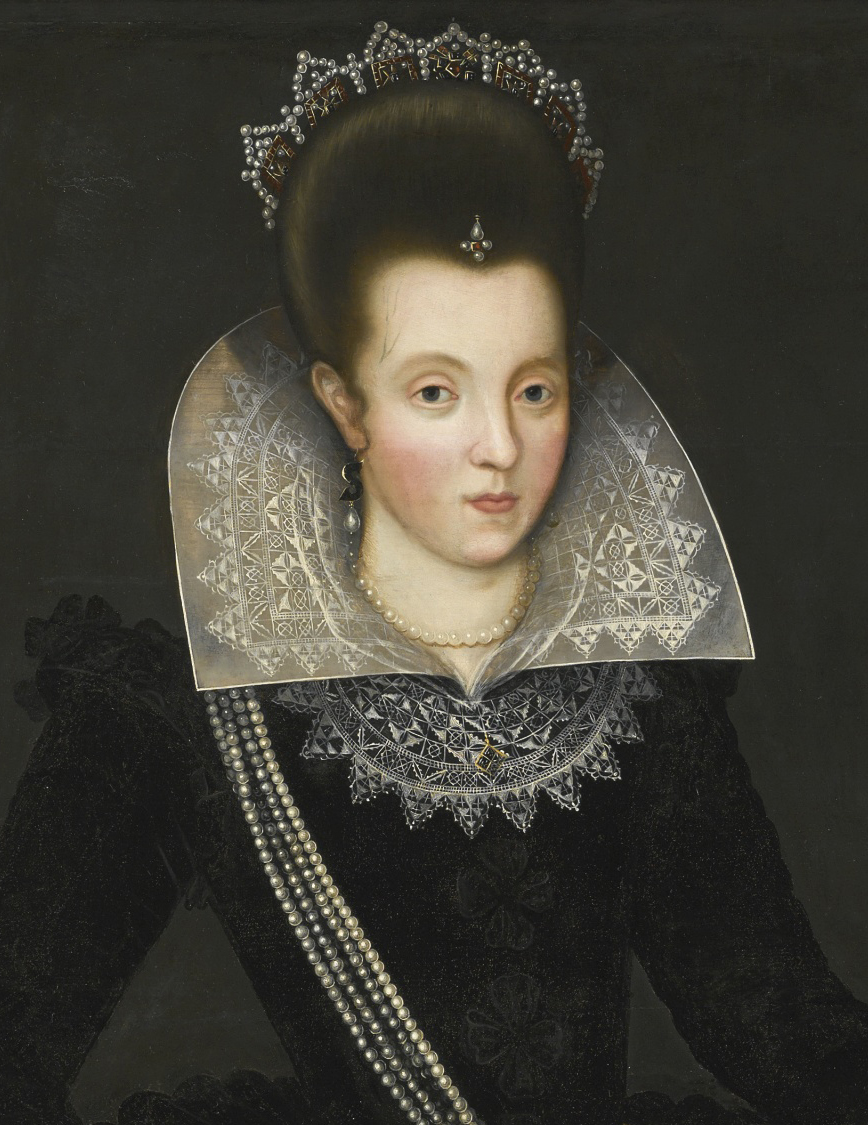

Duchess consort of Brunswick-Lüneburg
- Tenure: 11 June 1590 – 30 July 1613
- Born: 25 August 1573; Koldinghus Castle, Kolding, Kingdom of Denmark
- Died: 19 July 1625 (aged 51); Braunschweig, Brunswick-Wolfenbüttel
- Spouse: Henry Julius, Duke of Brunswick-Lüneburg (m. 1590; died 1613)
- Issue: Frederick Ulrich, Duke of Brunswick-Wolfenbüttel; Sophia, Princess of Nassau-Dietz; Elisabeth, Duchess of Saxe-Altenburg; Hedwig, Duchess of Pomerania; Dorothea of Brunswick-Wolfenbüttel, Margravine of Brandenburg; Heinrich Julius of Brunswick-Wolfenbüttel; Christian the Younger of Brunswick; Rudolph of Brunswick-Wolfenbüttel; Heinrich Karl of Brunswick-Wolfenbüttel; Anna Augusta, Countess of Nassau-Dillenburg
- House: Oldenburg
- Father: Frederick II of Denmark
- Mother: Sophie of Mecklenburg-Güstrow
- Religion: Lutheran

Elisabeth of Denmark (25 August 1573 – 19 July 1625) was duchess consort of Brunswick-Lüneburg as married to Duke Henry Julius of Brunswick-Lüneburg. She was regent of the Duchy of Brunswick-Lüneburg in place of her incapacitated son Frederick Ulrich, Duke of Brunswick-Lüneburg in 1616–1622.

== Life ==
She was the eldest daughter of King Frederick II of Denmark and his spouse Sophie of Mecklenburg-Güstrow. First raised with her maternal grandparents, she returned to Denmark in 1579.

Scottish ambassadors had at first concentrated their suit on Elisabeth as a prospective wife for King James VI of Scotland, but King Frederick betrothed Elisabeth to the Duke of Brunswick, promising the Scots instead that "for the second daughter Anna, if the King did like her, he should have her".

There were also other suitors for the princess. In addition to James VI of Scotland, Archduke Matthias of Austria (later Emperor Matthias) also had plans for a marriage to her, and during a visit to Denmark in February 1587, he had spoken to Frederick II about this, but nothing came of it, unknown for what reason. Presumably there have been religious concerns about this.

She was married on 19 April 1590 at Kronborg Castle to Duke Henry Julius of Brunswick-Lüneburg. James VI gave gifts of jewels at the wedding worth 4,000 Danish dalers. When her future spouse first arrived for the wedding in 1590, he disguised himself as a jeweler; he presented her with jewelry, and stated that prize was her body. As a result, he was thrown in jail until he could prove his identity and explain that it had been a joke.

As duchess, she remained in close correspondence with her brother, the Danish monarch. In September 1598 Scottish ambassadors David Cunningham and Peter Young came to Gröningen Priory seeking support for James VI's succession to the English throne. Henry Julius gave a cautious reply and in a separate letter Elizabeth replied that she had been ill for several months and had made a moderate recovery.

After the death of her husband in 1613, she reigned in her dowry. In 1616, she removed her son, Frederick Ulrich, from the government with the support of her brother, Christian IV of Denmark-Norway, because of his alcoholism. She resumed the regency, and she remained in charge for the next six years, assisted by Anton von Streithorst. She received a visit from her brother Christian in 1616.

In 1617, she founded the Retreat for the Poor with a chapel, Elisabeth Stift. During the Thirty Years War (1618–1648) the castle was raided and was not repaired until 1654.

== Issue ==
1. Frederick Ulrich, Duke of Brunswick-Lüneburg (15 April 1591 – 21 August 1634)
2. Sophia Hedwig of Brunswick-Wolfenbüttel (20 February 1592 – 23 January 1642), married Ernest Casimir, Prince of Nassau-Dietz
3. Elisabeth of Brunswick-Wolfenbüttel (23 June 1593 – 25 March 1650), married Augustus, Duke of Saxony, and John Philip, Duke of Saxe-Altenburg
4. Hedwig of Brunswick-Wolfenbüttel (19 February 1595 – 26 June 1650), married Ulrich, Duke of Pomerania
5. Dorothea of Brunswick-Wolfenbüttel (8 July 1596 – 1 September 1643), married Christian William of Brandenburg, son of Joachim III Frederick, Elector of Brandenburg
6. Heinrich Julius of Brunswick-Wolfenbüttel (7 October 1597 – 11 July 1606)
7. Christian the Younger of Brunswick-Wolfenbüttel (20 September 1599 – 16 July 1626)
8. Rudolph of Brunswick-Wolfenbüttel (15 June 1602 – 13 June 1616)
9. Heinrich Karl of Brunswick-Wolfenbüttel (4 September 1609 – 11 June 1615)
10. Anna Augusta of Brunswick-Wolfenbüttel (19 May 1612 – 17 February 1673), married George Louis, Count of Nassau-Dillenburg

== Ancestry ==
Ancestors of Elizabeth of Denmark, Duchess of Brunswick-Wolfenbüttel

16. Christian I of Denmark (=#28)
8. Frederick I of Denmark (=#14)
17. Dorothea of Brandenburg (=#29)
4. Christian III of Denmark
18. John Cicero, Elector of Brandenburg
9. Anna of Brandenburg
19. Margaret of Thuringia
2. Frederick II of Denmark
20. John V, Duke of Saxe-Lauenburg
10. Magnus I, Duke of Saxe-Lauenburg
21. Dorothea of Brandenburg
5. Dorothea of Saxe-Lauenburg
22. Henry IV, Duke of Brunswick-Lüneburg
11. Catherine of Brunswick
23. Catherine of Pomerania-Wolgast
1. Elisabeth of Denmark, Duchess of Brunswick-Wolfenbüttel
24. Magnus II, Duke of Mecklenburg
12. Albrecht VII, Duke of Mecklenburg
25. Sophie of Pomerania-Wolgast
6. Ulrich, Duke of Mecklenburg
26. Joachim I Nestor, Elector of Brandenburg
13. Anna of Brandenburg
27. Elizabeth of Denmark
3. Sophie of Mecklenburg-Güstrow
28. Christian I of Denmark (=#16)
14. Frederick I of Denmark (=#8)
29. Dorothea of Brandenburg (=#17)
7. Elisabeth of Denmark
30. Bogislaw X, Duke of Pomerania
15. Sophie of Pomerania
31. Anna of Poland
