= Aue-Fallstein =

- Municipality
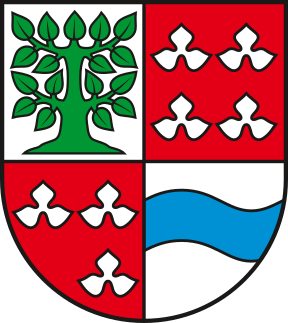
- Coat of arms
- Interactive map of Aue-Fallstein
- Location within Germany Location within Saxony-Anhalt
- Coordinates: 51°58′N 10°49′E
- Country: Germany
- State: Saxony-Anhalt
- District: Harz
- Disbanded: 2010

Area
  - Total: 118.41 km^{2} (45.72 sq mi)
- Elevation: 172 m (564 ft)

Population (2006-12-31)
  - Total: 5,245
  - Density: 44.30/km^{2} (114.7/sq mi)
- Time zone: UTC+01:00 (CET)
  - Summer (DST): UTC+02:00 (CEST)
- Postal codes: 38835
- Dialling codes: 039458-039421-039422
- Vehicle registration: HZ
- Website: www.aue-fallstein.de

Aue-Fallstein was a short-lived municipality in the district of Harz, in Saxony-Anhalt, Germany. It was formed on 11 September 2003 by the merger of the former municipalities Dardesheim, Deersheim, Hessen, Osterode am Fallstein, Rohrsheim, Veltheim and Zilly. On 1 January 2010, it was merged into the town Osterwieck.
