= Lüttgenrode =

- Stadtteil of Osterwieck
- Interactive map of Lüttgenrode
- Location within Germany Location within Saxony-Anhalt
- Coordinates: 51°58′2″N 10°39′59″E
- Country: Germany
- State: Saxony-Anhalt
- District: Harz
- Town: Osterwieck

Area
  - Total: 16.15 km^{2} (6.24 sq mi)
- Elevation: 169 m (554 ft)

Population (2006-12-31)
  - Total: 728
  - Density: 45.1/km^{2} (117/sq mi)
- Time zone: UTC+01:00 (CET)
  - Summer (DST): UTC+02:00 (CEST)
- Postal codes: 38835
- Dialling codes: 039421

Lüttgenrode is a village and a former municipality in the district of Harz, in Saxony-Anhalt, Germany. Since 1 January 2010, it is part of the town Osterwieck.
