= Julius, Duke of Brunswick-Lüneburg =

16th-century German nobleman

Julius
- Duke of Brunswick-Lüneburg
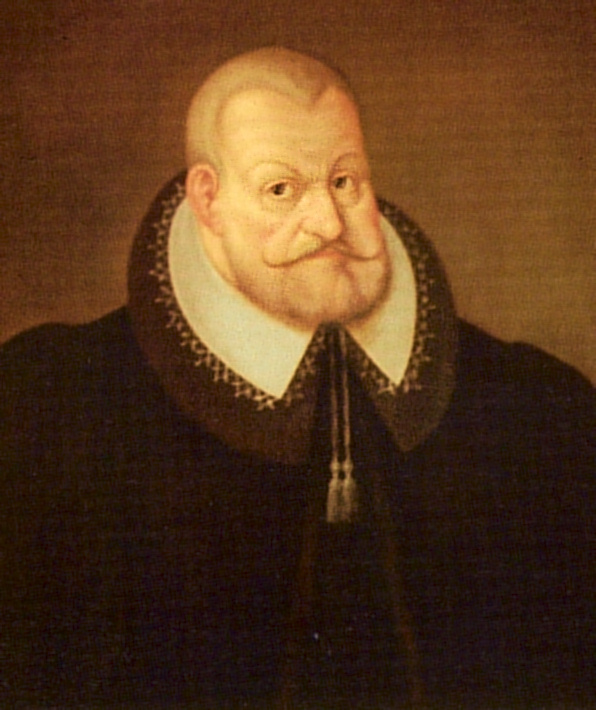
- Contemporary portrait

Prince of Brunswick-Wolfenbüttel
- Reign: 1568–1589
- Born: 29 June 1528; Wolfenbüttel, Duchy of Brunswick-Lüneburg
- Died: 3 May 1589 (aged 60); Wolfenbüttel
- Noble family: House of Welf
- Spouse: Hedwig of Brandenburg
- Issue: Sophie Hedwig; Henry Julius; Maria; Elisabeth; Philip Sigismund; Joachim Charles; Dorothea Augusta; Julius Augustus; Hedwig
- Father: Henry V, Duke of Brunswick-Lüneburg
- Mother: Maria of Württemberg

Julius of Brunswick-Lüneburg (also known as Julius of Braunschweig; 29 June 1528 – 3 May 1589), a member of the House of Welf, was Duke of Brunswick-Lüneburg and ruling Prince of Brunswick-Wolfenbüttel from 1568 until his death. From 1584, he also ruled over the Principality of Calenberg. By embracing the Protestant Reformation, establishing the University of Helmstedt, and introducing a series of administrative reforms, Julius was one of the most important Brunswick dukes in the early modern era.

== Life ==
Born at the princely court in Wolfenbüttel, Julius was the youngest surviving son of the warlike Duke Henry V of Brunswick-Lüneburg (1489–1568) and his consort Maria (1496–1541), daughter of the Swabian count Henry of Württemberg. His father, a devout Catholic, had significantly enlarged the territories of his Principality of Wolfenbüttel in the Hildesheim Diocesan Feud, but soon after entered a fierce conflict with the Schmalkaldic League which brought him close to the loss of his principality, until the Protestant forces were finally defeated in the 1547 Battle of Mühlberg.

As a younger son, Julius was expected to pursue a clerical career. He studied at the universities of Cologne and Leuven. He set out on a Grand Tour through France in 1550 and began to build up a personal collection of books, the basis of the later Herzog August Library in Wolfenbüttel. At the instigation of his father, Julius was appointed Prince-Bishop of Minden, by the cathedral chapter on 23 April 1553, succeeding Franz von Waldeck. He never received papal confirmation, however, and resigned after only a year.

In 1552 Julius' father Duke Henry V had joined a princely alliance against the not less warlike Hohenzollern margrave Albert Alcibiades of Brandenburg-Kulmbach. During the Second Margrave War, both sides met in the 1553 Battle of Sievershausen, where both Julius' elder brothers were killed in action. Suddenly, he became heir to the principality – for the distress of his father, who noted his feeble constitution and his sympathies for French culture and the Protestant faith.

Julius avoided an open conflict and temporarily withdrew to his residence at Hessen Castle.

This all came to a head at Easter 1558, when Julius refused to attend Catholic mass. This meant a final break with his father. He was able to avoid arrest by fleeing.

There was also the fact that his father had remarried in 1556 to the Polish princess Sophia Jagiellon, and actively working towards passing over Julius as heir in favor of any potential sons Henry might father with his new wife. With this in mind Julius fearing for his life had fled.

The marriage would however turn out to be childless.

As all plans to exclude him from the line of succession had failed, he succeeded as ruling Prince of Brunswick-Wolfenbüttel upon his father's death in 1568. He moved to Wolfenbüttel Castle.

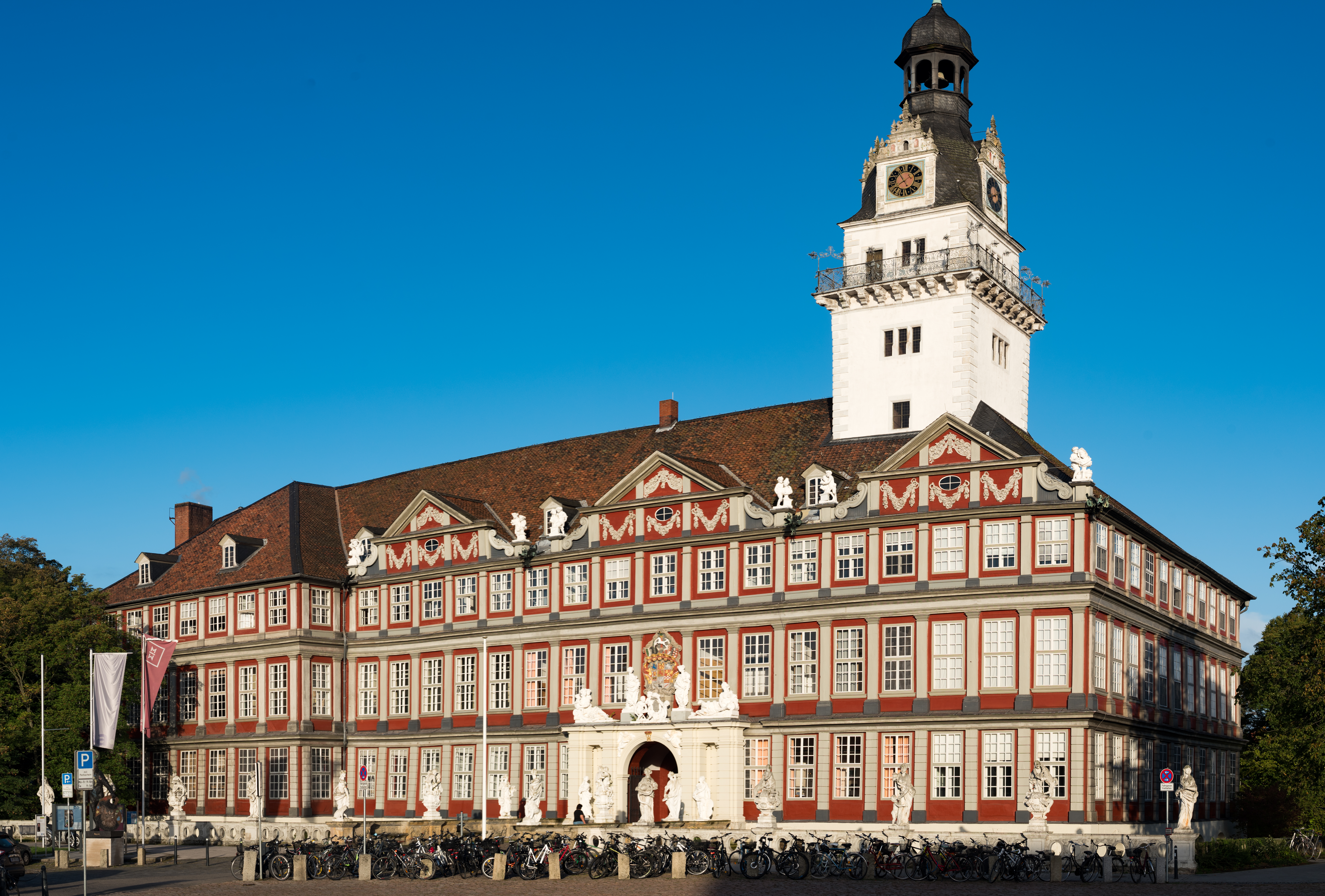
Wolfenbüttel Castle

Julius nevertheless tur a capable ruler. He immediately introduced the Reformation and instituted a tax reform that improved the rights of farmers in relation to noblemen. He also founded a militia — every head of household was required to own a weapon and participate in military training — and reformed the court system. Julius also entered into an agreement in the smouldering conflict with the Hanse city of Brunswick in 1569, in which the citizens recognized his overlordship; however, the quarrels between Duchy and City continued nonetheless.

By his mercantilist policies, Duke Julius promoted trade and especially mining. Copper and lead mining in the Harz mountains flourished, and many new mines were opened. Julius himself wrote a book about the uses of marl. To enable the sale of mining products, Julius invested into the improvements of roads and rivers. In 1577 the Oker river was made navigable between the Harz range and the armouries in Wolfenbüttel. On 15 October 1576, Julius solemnly inaugurated the Academia Julia, the first university of the state in Helmstedt, intended to train Protestant clergy for the newly reformed state according to his Lutheran Church Order. As a Protestant prince, he signed both the 1577 Formula of Concord and the Book of Concord three years later.

In 1581, he purchased the palazzo Ca' Vendramin Calergi on the Grand Canal in Venice, one of his favorite cities to visit. He paid 50,000 ducats for the palazzo to the Loredan family, who were having financial difficulties at the time. However, he sold it only two years later to Duke Guglielmo Gonzaga of Mantua. Julius also had the Dutch architect Hans Vredeman de Vries lay out a network of grachten in his Wolfenbüttel residence.

Julius enlarged his territories with the acquisition of the eastern exclave of Calvörde in 1571 and parts of the County of Hoya in 1582. Upon the death of his Welf cousin Duke Eric II of Brunswick-Lüneburg in 1584, Julius inherited the Principality of Calenberg. He died in 1589 and was succeeded by his eldest son Henry Julius.

== Family ==
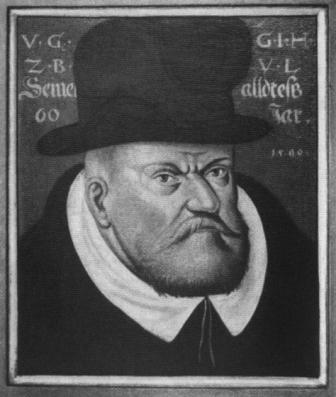
Duke Julius of Brunswick, 1590 portrait

Julius married Hedwig (1540–1602), a younger daughter of Elector Joachim II Hector of Brandenburg, on 25 February 1560. They had the following children who reached adulthood:

- Sophie Hedwig (1561–1631), married Duke Ernest Louis of Pomerania-Wolgast
- Henry Julius (1564–1613)
- Maria (13 January 1566 – 13 August 1626), married on 10 November 1582 Duke Francis II of Saxe-Lauenburg
- Elisabeth (1567–1618), married Adolf XI, Count of Holstein-Schauenburg-Pinneburg and Christopher, Duke of Brunswick-Harburg
- Philip Siegmund, Bishop of Osnabrück (1568–1623)
- Joachim Charles, Provost of Strasbourg (1573–1615)
- Dorothea Augusta, Abbess of Gandersheim (1577–1625)
- Julius Augustus, Abbot of Michaelstein (1578–1617)
- Hedwig (1580–1657), married Otto III, Duke of Brunswick-Harburg and brother of Christopher.

Julius, Duke of Brunswick-Lüneburg House of Welf Cadet branch of the House of Este Born: 29 June 1528 Died: 3 May 1589
Regnal titles
Catholic Church titles
Preceded by Francis II	Prince-Bishop of Minden; 1553–1554	Succeeded by George
Regnal titles
Preceded by Henry V	Duke of Brunswick-Lüneburg; Prince of Brunswick-Wolfenbüttel; 1568–1589	Succeeded by Henry Julius
Preceded by Eric II	Duke of Brunswick-Lüneburg; Prince of Calenberg; 1584–1589	Succeeded by Henry Julius
