= List of monarchs of the Netherlands =

Coat of arms of the Netherlands

This is a list of monarchs of the Netherlands (Dutch: Koningen der Nederlanden). The list includes the pre-monarchical stadtholders of the House of Orange-Nassau (1572–1795), the hiatus of the French puppet monarchy (1806–1810), and the return of the House of Orange-Nassau as monarchs (1813–present). The list starts in 1572, when the Estates of Holland independently reinstated William the Silent as their stadtholder. He had previously been dismissed by the Spanish King Philip II, due to his leading role in the Dutch Revolt, and his reinstatement marked a pivotal step toward the emergence of an independent state under the political and military leadership of the House of Orange-Nassau. He established the royal status of this dynasty by inheriting the sovereign Principality of Orange, adding to his existing title as Count of Nassau the title 'Prince of Orange' —a lineage and a colour with which all subsequent stadtholders and, to this day, all Dutch monarchs are exclusively associated. For this reason, he is better known in the Netherlands as William of Orange. As stadtholder he is known as William I, as later heirs (both stadtholders and monarchs) would bear his name in remembrance of his stature. In the national anthem the "Wilhelmus", he features as Wilhelmus/Willem of Nassau. Written around 1570 in his honor, the song explicitly designated him as ‘Genaedigen Forsten’ (“Gracious Sovereign”) and Patris Patriae (“Father of the Nation”). However, as the stadtholders were officially appointed by, and served as first civil servants and generals for, the semi-independent provinces of the Dutch Republic, they cannot technically be viewed as monarchs, although they maintained a grand court and effectively behaved like monarchs in daily political practice.

William the Silent had been stadtholder of four provinces. From his son Maurice onwards, that number rose to five. Meanwhile, their cousins of the House of Nassau-Dietz were appointed to the remaining two, Friesland and Groningen. In 1702, when the childless king-stadtholder William III died (who was also King of England), his title of Prince of Orange and his claims passed to this Frisian cousin line, making them the sole remaining branch of the House of Orange-Nassau. This succession maintained a cognatic line to William the Silent through his granddaughter Albertine Agnes of Nassau, who had married in 1652 into the Frisian cousin line. Following the French invasion in 1747, William IV, who emerged from this cousin line, was not only appointed stadtholder of all seven provinces, but the office was also formally made hereditary, although it had already largely been so in practice. His son, stadtholder William V, was forced into exile in England during the French Revolution and the following invasion of 1795. The French paradoxically introduced the formal concept of monarchy through Napoleon's brother, Louis Bonaparte, who ruled as king over the Netherlands. The country restored its independence in 1813 and recalled William V's son, William Frederick, from exile; he formally established the modern Kingdom of the Netherlands in 1815 as King William I, and securing the dynastic continuity of the House of Orange-Nassau that extends to the reigning monarch today, Willem Alexander.

== Dutch Republic (1581–1795) ==
=== Stadtholderate under the House of Orange-Nassau ===
The political origins of the Dutch monarchy dates back to 1559, when Philip II of Spain appointed William I, Prince of Orange as stadtholder of Holland, Zeeland and Utrecht. Following his dismissal by the Spanish King Philip II for his leadership in the Dutch Revolt, the States-General reinstated him as stadtholder of the rebelling provinces in 1572. Due to his foundational role in the uprising, he became revered as the Pater Patriae ("Father of the Fatherland").

When the United Provinces formally severed ties with the Spanish Crown through the Act of Abjuration in 1581, the traditional role of stadtholder underwent a radical transformation. Since the feudal lord had been abjured, the representative function of the office became obsolete. Rather than being abolished, the office was adapted by the newly formed Republic of the Seven United Netherlands; the stadtholder was reconstituted as the highest executive official and military commander, formally appointed by and serving at the pleasure of the sovereign States of each individual province.

Name	Lifespan	Reign start	Reign end	Notes	Family	Image
William I: the Silent; Willem I	24 April 1533 – 10 July 1584 (aged 51)	26 July 1581	10 July 1584	Stadtholder, (Note: Stadtholder of Holland, Zeeland and Utrecht (1559–1584), Stadtholder of Friesland and Overijssel (1580–1584)) son of William I, Count of Nassau-Siegen and Juliana of Stolberg	Orange-Nassau	William, Prince of Orange
Maurice: Maurits	14 November 1567 – 23 April 1625 (aged 57)	14 November 1585	23 April 1625	Stadtholder, (Note: Stadtholder of Holland and Zeeland (1585–1625), Utrecht, Guelders and Overijssel (1590–1625), Groningen (1620–1625)) son of William I and Anna of Saxony	Orange-Nassau	
Frederick Henry: Frederik Hendrik	29 January 1584 – 14 March 1647 (aged 63)	23 April 1625	14 March 1647	Stadtholder, (Note: Stadtholder of Holland, Zeeland, Utrecht, Guelders, and Overijssel (1620–1625), Groningen and Drenthe (1640–1647)) son of William I and Louise de Coligny	Orange-Nassau	
William II: Willem II	27 May 1626 – 6 November 1650 (aged 24)	14 March 1647	6 November 1650	Stadtholder, (Note: Stadtholder of Holland, Zeeland, Utrecht, Guelders, Groningen, Drenthe and Overijssel) son of Frederick Henry and Amalia of Solms-Braunfels	Orange-Nassau	
William III: Willem III	4 November 1650 – 8 March 1702 (aged 51)	4 July 1672	8 March 1702	Stadtholder, (Note: Stadtholder of Holland, Zeeland, Utrecht and Overijssel (1672–1702), Guelders (1675–1702), Drenthe (1696–1702)) son of William II and Mary, Princess Royal and Princess of Orange also King of England, Scotland and Ireland	Orange-Nassau	
William IV: Willem IV	1 September 1711 – 22 October 1751 (aged 40)	4 May 1747	22 October 1751	First formally hereditary Stadtholder of the United Netherlands, (Note: Hereditary Stadtholder of Friesland (1711–1747), Holland, Zeeland, Utrecht and Overijssel (April/May 1747 – November 1747), Stadtholder of Groningen (1718–1747), Guelders and Drenthe (1722–1747), was formally voted the first Hereditary Stadtholder of the United Provinces (1747–1751)) son of John William Friso and Marie Louise of Hesse-Kassel	Orange-Nassau	
William V: Willem V	8 March 1748 – 9 April 1806 (aged 58)	22 October 1751	19 January 1795	Hereditary Stadtholder of the United Netherlands, son of William IV and Anne, Princess Royal and Princess of Orange, deposed by the Batavian Revolution	Orange-Nassau	

=== Stadtholderate under the House of Nassau-Dietz ===
When William III died childless, the patrilineal ancestry of Orange-Nassau became extinct. In contrast to other provinces of the Dutch Republic, Friesland, Groningen and Drenthe had mostly drawn their stadtholders from the House of Nassau-Dietz, that starting with John VI, the brother of William of Orange, and comprises in addition a cognatic line to William the Silent through his granddaughter Albertine Agnes of Nassau, who had married in 1652 into this Frisian cousin line.

Name	Lifespan	Reign start	Reign end	Notes	Family	Image
John VI: the Elder; Jan VI	22 November 1536 – 8 October 1606 (aged 69)	1578	1581	Stadtholder, (Note: Stadtholder of Guelders (under Philip II), architect of the Union of Utrecht) son of William I, Count of Nassau-Siegen and Juliana of Stolberg, brother of William I	Nassau	
William Louis: Our Father; Willem Lodewijk	13 March 1560 – 31 May 1620 (aged 60)	1584	1620	Stadtholder, (Note: Stadtholder of Friesland (1584–1620), Groningen (1594–1620) and Drenthe (1596–1620)) son of John VI and Countess Elisabeth of Leuchtenberg	Nassau	
Ernest Casimir I: Ernst Casimir I	22 December 1573 – 2 June 1632 (aged 58)	1620	1632	Stadtholder, (Note: Stadtholder of Friesland (1620–1632), Groningen and Drenthe (1625–1632)) son of John VI and Countess Elisabeth of Leuchtenberg	Nassau	
Henry Casimir I: Hendrik Casimir I	21 January 1612 – 13 July 1640 (aged 28)	1632	1640	Stadtholder, (Note: Stadtholder of Friesland (1632–1640), Groningen and Drenthe (1632–1640)) son of Ernest Casimir I and Sophia Hedwig of Brunswick-Lüneburg	Nassau	
William Frederick: Willem Frederik	7 August 1613 – 31 October 1664 (aged 51)	1640	1664	Stadtholder, (Note: Stadtholder of Friesland (1640–1664), Groningen and Drenthe (1650–1664)) son of Ernest Casimir I and Sophia Hedwig of Brunswick-Lüneburg	Nassau	
Henry Casimir II: Hendrik Casimir II	18 January 1657 – 25 March 1696 (aged 39)	18 January 1664	25 March 1696	Hereditary Stadtholder, (Note: In 1675 the State of Friesland voted to make the Stadtholdership hereditary in the house of Nassau-Dietz) son of William Frederick and Albertine Agnes of Nassau, maternal grandson of Frederick Henry	Nassau	
John William Friso: Johan Willem Friso	4 August 1687 – 14 July 1711 (aged 23)	25 March 1696	14 July 1711	Hereditary Stadtholder, (Note: Hereditary Stadtholder of Friesland (1707–1711) and Groningen (1708–1711)) son of Henry Casimir II and Princess Henriëtte Amalia of Anhalt-Dessau, succeeded by his son William IV of Orange-Nassau, Hereditary Stadtholder of the United Netherlands	Nassau	

== Kingdom of Holland (1806–1810) ==
In 1795, the Republic was overthrown by the French Republic and replaced with the Batavian Republic. In 1806 Napoleon abolished the new republic and made his brother King of Holland. However, in 1810 Napoleon invaded the Netherlands and annexed the country to the French Empire.

Name	Lifespan	Reign start	Reign end	Notes	Family	Image
Louis I: the Good; Lodewijk I	2 September 1778 – 25 July 1846 (aged 67)	5 June 1806	1 July 1810	Son of Carlo Buonaparte and Letizia Bonaparte, brother of Napoleon	Bonaparte	Louis I of Holland
Louis II: Lodewijk II	11 October 1804 – 17 March 1831 (aged 26)	1 July 1810	13 July 1810	Son of Louis I and Hortense de Beauharnais	Bonaparte	Louis II of Holland

== Sovereign Principality of the United Netherlands (1813–1815) ==
Following the collapse of the Napoleonic regime, and allied forces drove out the French in 1813, the Dutch called back William Frederick, the son of the last stadtholder William V, to head the new government. He was proclaimed "sovereign prince" and the country briefly existed as the Sovereign Principality of the United Netherlands.

Name	Lifespan	Reign start	Reign end	Notes	Family	Image
William Frederick: Willem Frederik	24 August 1772 – 12 December 1843 (aged 71)	6 December 1813	16 March 1815	Son of the last Stadtholder William V and Wilhelmina of Prussia, Princess of Orange, raised the Netherlands to a Kingdom status in 1815	Orange-Nassau	William Frederick of the Netherlands

== Kingdom of the Netherlands (1815–present) ==
At the Congress of Vienna in 1815, William I ceded his ancestral German lands—making him the last sovereign Prince of Orange of his dynasty—in exchange for being proclaimed, as William I, King of the Netherlands and Grand Duke of Luxembourg. The kingdom was enlarged with the Southern Netherlands. Consequently, he appears under both titles during his respective reigns. The kingdom included Belgium until its secession in 1830. To finalize this separation between Belgium an the Netherlands, the Treaty of London (1839) designated the Dutch monarchs as Dukes of Limburg; this newly created duchy (formed from the remaining Dutch part of Limburg) was integrated into the German Confederation until its dissolution in 1866 as territorial compensation for Luxembourgish lands ceded to Belgium. The personal union with Luxembourg ended upon the death of King William III in 1890; since the Dutch throne passed to his daughter Wilhelmina, the Grand Ducal crown reverted to the closest male heir, Duke Adolphe. The monarchs also reigned over the realm's overseas territories; initially as colonies, and from 1954 onwards as equal constituent countries within the Kingdom, including the Dutch East Indies (until 1949), Dutch New Guinea (until 1962), Suriname (until 1975), and the Netherlands Antilles. Following the dissolution of the Netherlands Antilles in 2010, the monarch remained head of state over all six islands, with Aruba, Curaçao, and Sint Maarten acting as constituent countries within the Kingdom, and the Caribbean Netherlands (Bonaire, Sint Eustatius, and Saba) integrated directly into the Netherlands as special municipalities.

Name	Lifespan	Reign start	Reign end	Notes	Family	Image
William I: Willem I	24 August 1772 – 12 December 1843 (aged 71)	16 March 1815	7 October 1840	Son of the last Stadtholder William V and Wilhelmina of Prussia, Princess of Orange Abdicated	Orange-Nassau	William I of the Netherlands
William II: Willem II	6 December 1792 – 17 March 1849 (aged 56)	7 October 1840	17 March 1849	Son of William I and Wilhelmine of Prussia	Orange-Nassau	William II of the Netherlands
William III: Willem III	19 February 1817 – 23 November 1890 (aged 73)	17 March 1849	23 November 1890	Son of William II and Anna Pavlovna of Russia	Orange-Nassau	William III of the Netherlands
Wilhelmina	31 August 1880 – 28 November 1962 (aged 82)	23 November 1890	4 September 1948	Daughter of William III and Emma of Waldeck and Pyrmont Abdicated	Orange-Nassau	Wilhelmina of the Netherlands
Juliana	30 April 1909 – 20 March 2004 (aged 94)	4 September 1948	30 April 1980	Daughter of Wilhelmina and Duke Henry of Mecklenburg-Schwerin Abdicated	Orange-Nassau	Juliana of the Netherlands
Beatrix	31 January 1938 (age 88)	30 April 1980	30 April 2013	Daughter of Juliana and Prince Bernhard of Lippe-Biesterfeld Abdicated	Orange-Nassau	Beatrix of the Netherlands
William-Alexander: Willem-Alexander	27 April 1967 (age 59)	30 April 2013	Incumbent	Son of Beatrix and Prince Claus, Jonkheer van Amsberg	Orange-Nassau	William-Alexander of the Netherlands

== See also ==
- Style of the Dutch sovereign
- Regalia of the Netherlands
- Flags of the Dutch royal family
- Succession to the Dutch throne
- List of heirs to the Dutch throne
- Lists of rulers in the Low Countries
- Inauguration of the Dutch monarch
- List of Dutch royal consorts
- Monarchy of the Netherlands
