= Siegen =

- City
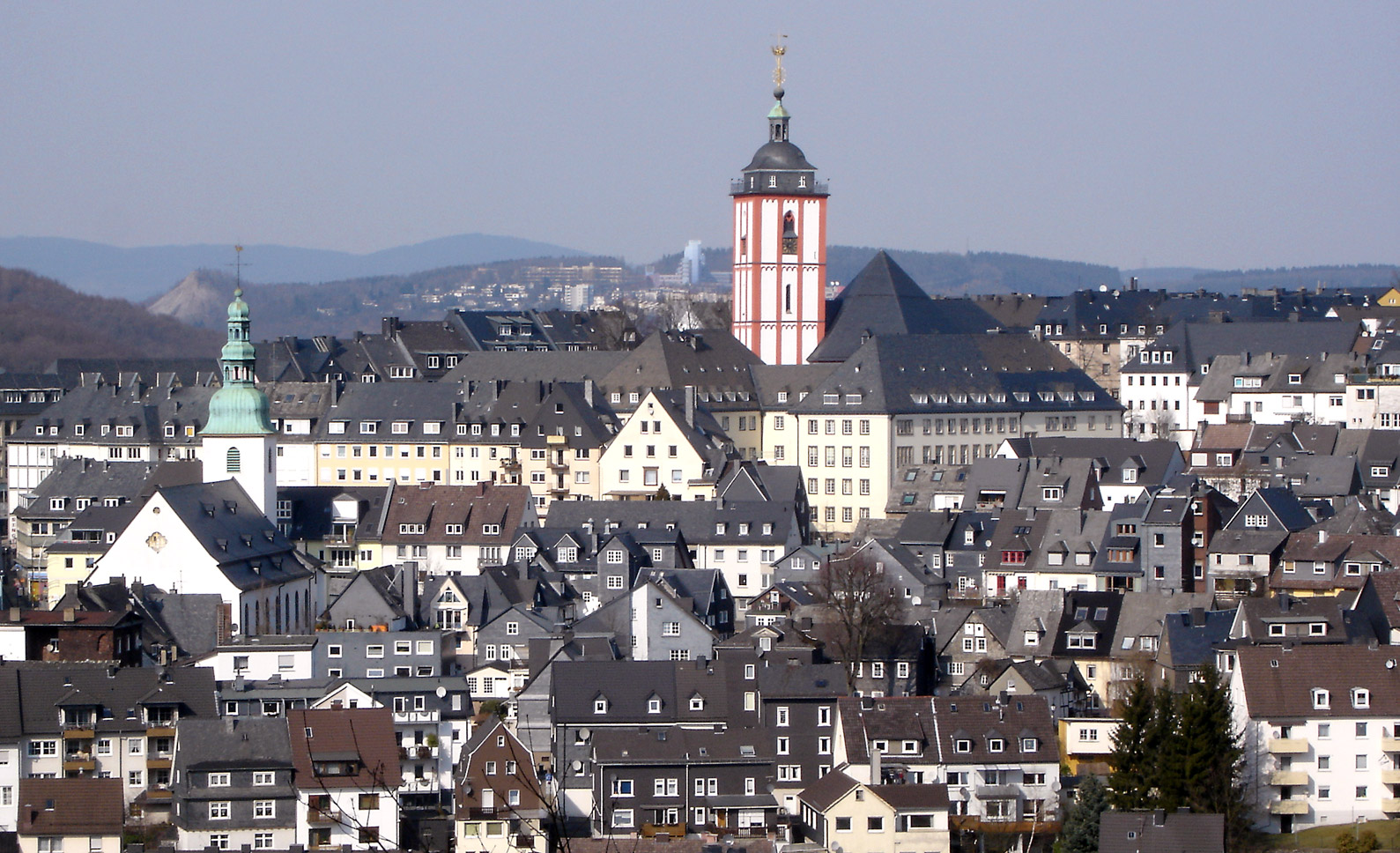
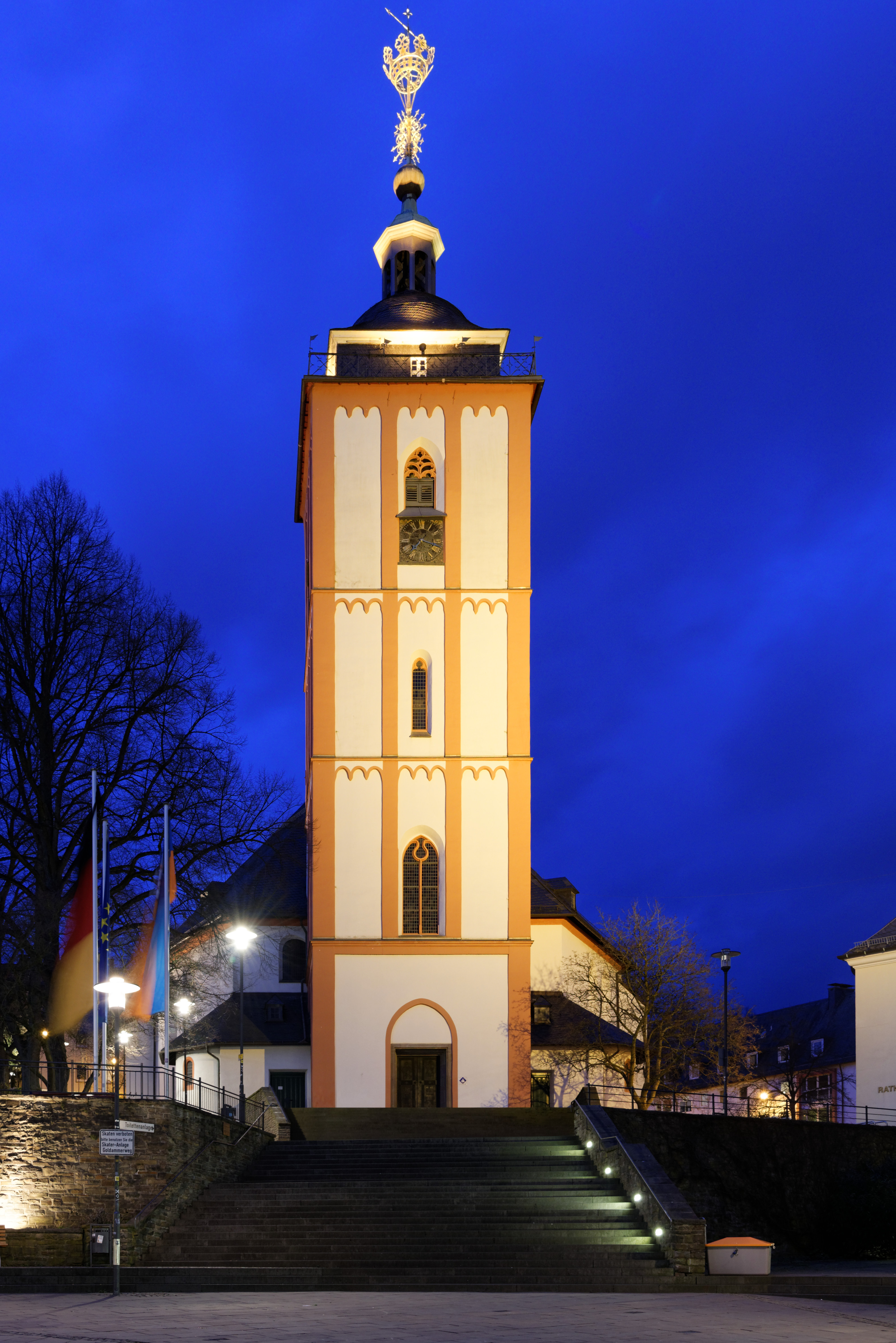
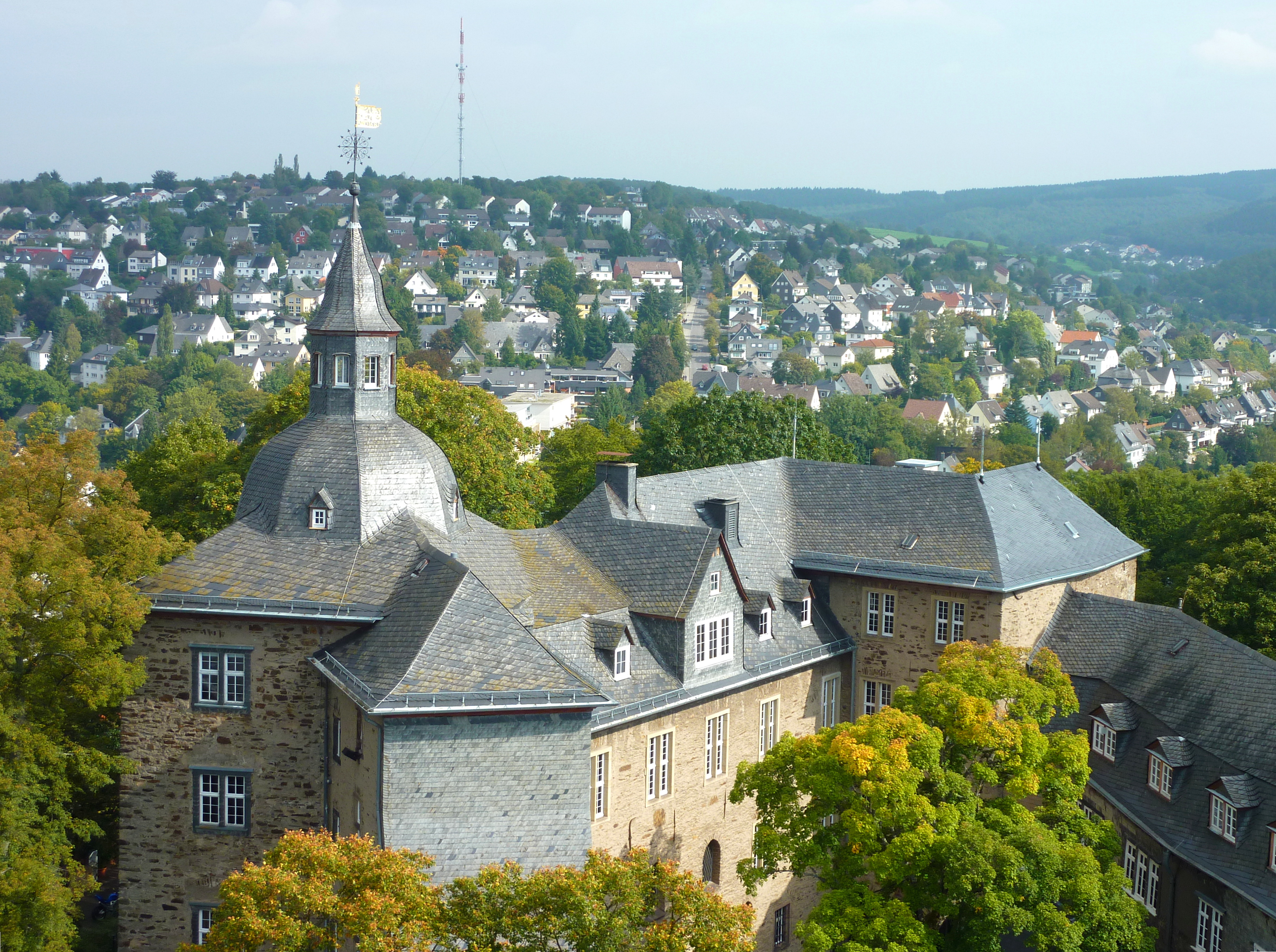
- Upper town Nikolaikirche Oberes Schloss

- Flag Coat of arms

- Location of Siegen within Siegen-Wittgenstein district
- Interactive map of Siegen
- Location within Germany Location within North Rhine-Westphalia
- Coordinates: 50°53′N 8°1′E
- Country: Germany
- State: North Rhine-Westphalia
- Admin. region: Arnsberg
- District: Siegen-Wittgenstein

Government
  - Mayor (2025–30): Tristan Vitt (SPD)

Area
  - Total: 114.69 km^{2} (44.28 sq mi)
- Elevation: 290 m (950 ft)

Population (2025-12-31)
  - Total: 102,450
  - Density: 893.28/km^{2} (2,313.6/sq mi)
- Time zone: UTC+01:00 (CET)
  - Summer (DST): UTC+02:00 (CEST)
- Postal codes: 57072–57080
- Dialling codes: 0271
- Vehicle registration: SI
- Website: www.siegen.de

Siegen (German: [ˈziːɡn̩]) is a city in Germany, in the south Westphalian part of North Rhine-Westphalia.

It is located in the district of Siegen-Wittgenstein in the Arnsberg region. The university town (nearly 20,000 students in the 2018–2019 winter semester) is the district seat, and is ranked as a "higher centre" in the South Westphalian urban agglomeration.

In 1975, municipal reforms and amalgamations lifted Siegen's population above the 100,000 mark.

== Geography ==
=== Location ===
The city of Siegen lies in the basin of the upper reaches of the river Sieg. From there, lateral valleys branch off in many directions. The heights of the surrounding mountains, wherever they are not actually settled, are covered in coppice. To the north lies the Sauerland, to the northwest the Rothaargebirge and to the southwest the Westerwald.

The nearest cities to Siegen, taking into account average travelling distances, are Hagen to the north 83 km (52 mi), Frankfurt am Main to the southeast 125 km (78 mi), Koblenz to the southwest 105 km (65 mi) and Cologne to the west 93 km (58 mi).

As the crow flies the distances to these places are, however, 65 km (40 mi) (Hagen), 95 km (59 mi) (Frankfurt), 65 km (40 mi) (Koblenz) and 75 km (47 mi) (Cologne).

The city lies on the German-Dutch holiday road called the Orange Route, joining towns, cities and regions associated with the House of Orange.

=== City area ===
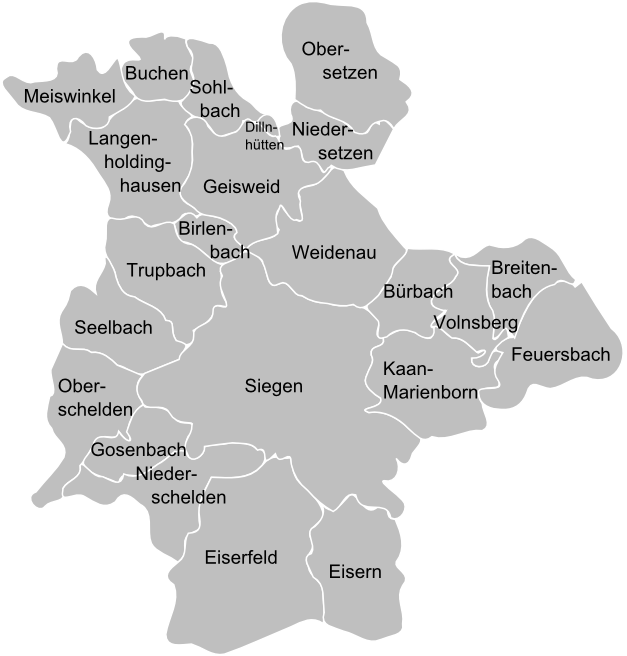
Divisions within the city

The city's total land area is roughly 115 km^{2} (44 sq mi). Its greatest east-west span is about 12 km (7 mi), and its greatest north-south span is about 12 km (7 mi). City limits are 48 km (30 mi) long. Siegen lies at a median elevation of 290 m (951 ft) above sea level. The city's greatest elevation is the peak of the Pfannenberg at 499 m (1,637 ft) above sea level at southern city limits. Siegen's lowest point is 215 m (705 ft) above sea level at Niederschelden at southwestern city limits, which there also forms the state boundary with Rhineland-Palatinate. Roughly 60% of the city's land is wooded, making Siegen one of Germany's greenest cities.

The city area is divided into six zones, called Bezirke in German and comparable to boroughs in some cities, which themselves are further divided into various communities (Ortsteile and Stadtteile). Each "borough" has a borough board consisting of 15 voting and 15 non-voting members who are appointed by city council with regard to each party's share of the vote in the municipal elections in the borough in question. The borough boards decide on matters particular to their respective boroughs. These matters are laid down in Siegen's city charter.

==== Administrative division ====
Siegen's six boroughs and communities belonging to each boroughs are:

- District I (Geisweid): Birlenbach, Meiswinkel, Langenholdinghausen, Geisweid, Dillnhütten, Sohlbach, Buchen, Niedersetzen, Obersetzen
- District II (Weidenau): Weidenau
- District III (Ost): Kaan-Marienborn, parts of Alt-Siegen (Giersberg), Bürbach, Volnsberg, Breitenbach, Feuersbach
- District IV (Mitte): Alt-Siegen (Kernband (=City Centre), Lindenberg, Häusling, Winchenbach)
- District V (West): Seelbach, Trupbach and parts of Alt-Siegen (Wellersberg, Fischbacherberg, Achenbach, Rothenberg)
- District VI (Süd): Oberschelden, Gosenbach, Niederschelden, Eiserfeld, Eisern

Along with the boroughs and communities into which the city is divided, as mandated by law, there are also further subdivisions within the communities, each with its own name, but none with distinctly clear borders. They are called Quartiere, which can be rendered as "quarters" or "neighbourhoods". Examples of these include the Unterstadt, the Oberstadt, Hammerhütte, Lindenberg, Charlottental, Haardter Berg (with the university) and the Alte Dreisbach. Some neighbourhoods even straddle community boundaries, like Sieghütte, parts of which can be found in both Siegen-Mitte and Weidenau. Moreover, some neighbourhoods even overlap each other. Unlike the boroughs (Bezirke) or communities (Ortsteile and Stadtteile), the Quartiere have no statistical or administrative importance. They do, however, serve some function as to their inhabitants' identity, but more practically than that, they are also useful for finding one's way with a city map and using in bus route names and on public notices and traffic signs. Many of the Hüttentalstraße city Autobahn's exits are also named after the Quartiere that they serve.

The communities of Weidenau, Geisweid, Birlenbach, Langenholdinghausen, Buchen, Sohlbach, Dillnhütten, Niedersetzen, Obersetzen and Meiswinkel formed from 1 July 1966 to 31 December 1974 the town of Hüttental. The communities of Eiserfeld, Eisern, Gosenbach, Niederschelden and Oberschelden formed the town of Eiserfeld between those same two dates.

=== Neighbouring communities ===
The city of Siegen borders in the north on the town of Kreuztal and the community of Wenden, in the east on the town of Netphen, in the southeast on the community of Wilnsdorf, in the south on the community of Neunkirchen, in the west on the community of Mudersbach (Altenkirchen in Rhineland-Palatinate) and in the northwest on the town of Freudenberg.

== History ==
The name Siegen comes from the possibly Celtic river name Sieg. It is, however, unclear whether there is any relation between this name and the Celtic-Germanic Sicambri (Ger. Sugambrer) people, who in pre-Christian times lived in parts of North Rhine-Westphalia. The first documentary mention of the place called Sigena dates from 1079. The city's history is markedly shaped by mining, which locally began as far back as La Tène times. Bearing witness to this longtime industry are the many mines that can be found within city limits.

In 1224, Siegen is mentioned as a newly built town whose ownership was shared by the Count of Nassau, Heinrich the Rich, and Engelbert II of Berg, Archbishop of Cologne after the latter transferred one half of the ownership to the former. Moreover, there is proof that the Oberes Schloss ("upper stately home") was already standing at this time. On 19 October 1303, the town was granted Soester Stadtrecht, or Soest town rights. The town remained under the two overlords' joint ownership until 1 February 1381, only then passing fully into Nassau hands.

In the 16th century, the town of Siegen bore a formidable defensive look. It was surrounded by mighty walls with 16 towers and three town gates, and was home to a great castle. The town was stricken several times by townwide fires. Documents record such fires in 1592, and from 10 to 20 April 1695.

In 1536, Heinrich the Rich built a "paedagogium" in the buildings that had once housed a Franciscan Monastery. It later grew into today's Gymnasium at Siegen's Löhrtor (gate). John VII of Nassau-Siegen ("John the Middle") built the Unteres Schloss ("lower stately home") on the site of an old Franciscan Monastery. In 1616, John VII founded a knightly war school in the still standing old armoury on Burgstraße, "expressly to produce an officer corps for Calvinism".

His son John VIII ("The Younger") returned in 1612 to the Roman Catholic Church, and wanted to use force to make the townsfolk also convert back to Roman Catholicism. In 1632, Nassau-Siegen was conquered by the Swedes, after which his half-brother John Maurice of Nassau-Siegen, the Dutch commander in Brazil, re-introduced Protestantism. John VIII died in 1638 and was succeeded by his only son Johan Frans Desideratus, who had to cede part of Nassau-Siegen (north of the Sieg river) to the Protestant branch of the family.

John Maurice's leadership served in 1650–1651 to bring about a split in the Siegerland along denominational lines. Under Wilhelm Hyacinth of Nassau-Siegen, violence broke out between the two denominational groups. When on 29 March 1707 townsman Friedrich Flender was killed, Wilhelm Hyacinth was himself unseated and furthermore driven out of the town. Wilhelm Hyacinth was the last in the line of Nassau-Siegen's Catholic rulers, dying in 1743. Already in 1734, though, the Reformed line had died out, too, with Friedrich Wilhelm's death, leading Charles VI, Holy Roman Emperor to transfer power in the territory to the Prince of Orange and the Prince of Nassau-Diez. Under their leadership, mining, the main source of wealth, blossomed, along with agriculture and silviculture. When Prince William of Orange refused to join the Confederation of the Rhine, founded by Napoleon, he found himself unseated by the French leader and the Siegerland passed to the Grand Duchy of Berg. After Napoleon's downfall in 1813, however, William I regained his former German inheritances, but in 1815 he ceded them to the Kingdom of Prussia for the Grand Duchy of Luxembourg. Siegen was assigned to the Siegen district, first in the Koblenz region, and as of 1817 in the Arnsberg region within the Prussian Province of Westphalia.

Under Prussian rule, Siegen developed into the South Westphalian centre that it is today. On 1 March 1923, Siegen was set apart from the district bearing its name, and became a district-free town, while still keeping its function as seat of the district of which it was no longer part, and which was itself merged with Wittgenstein district under district reform in 1975. Siegen also lost its district-free status at this time, becoming part of the new Siegen-Wittgenstein district, the name that the district has borne since 1984.

During World War II, Siegen was repeatedly bombed by the Allies owing to a crucial railroad that crossed through the town. On 1 April 1945, the US 8th Infantry Division began the Allied ground assault against Siegen and the dominating military-significant high ground north of the river. The battle against determined German forces at Siegen continued through 2 April 1945, until organized resistance was finally overwhelmed by the division on 3 April 1945.

=== Religion ===
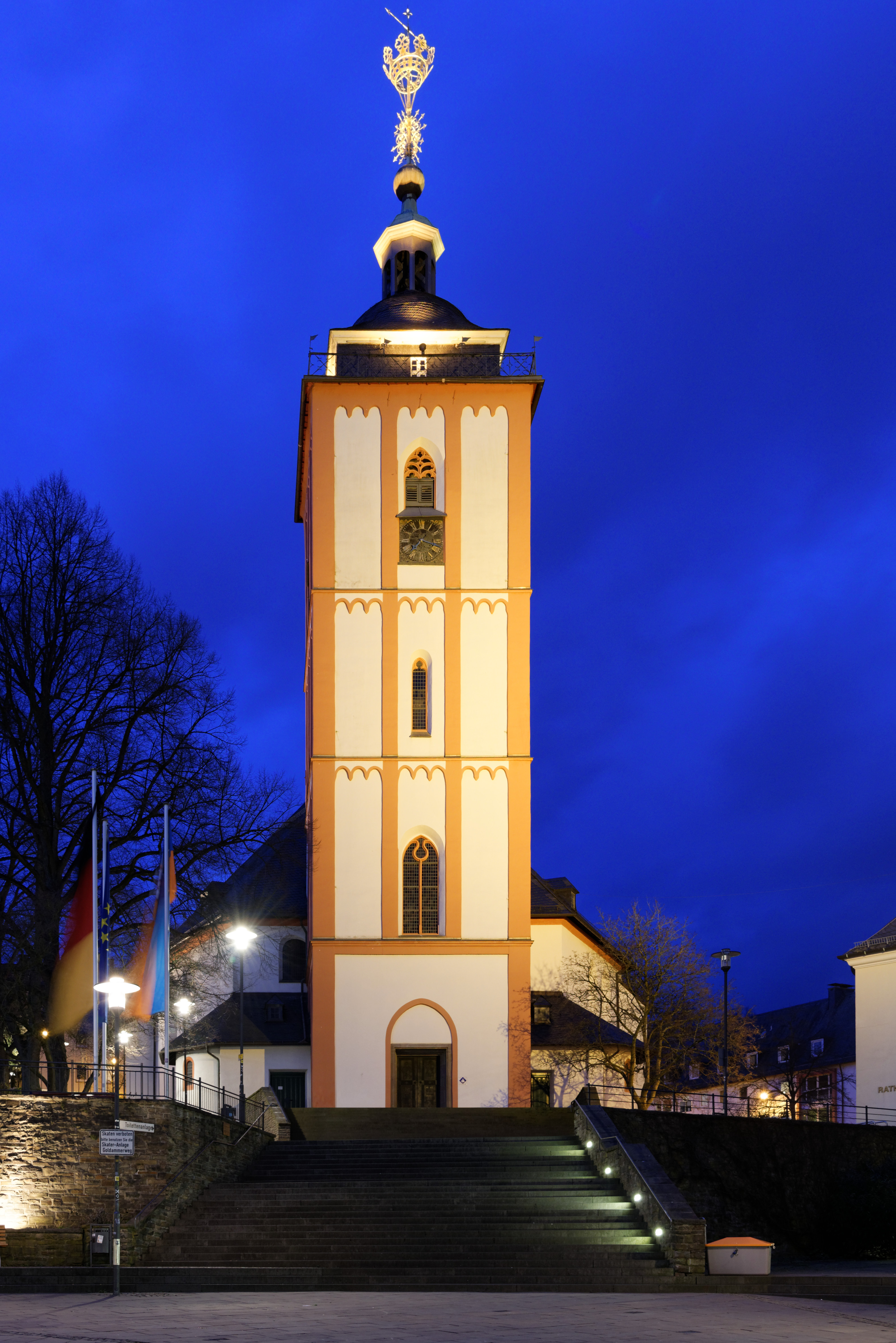
Nikolaikirche with a "coronet"

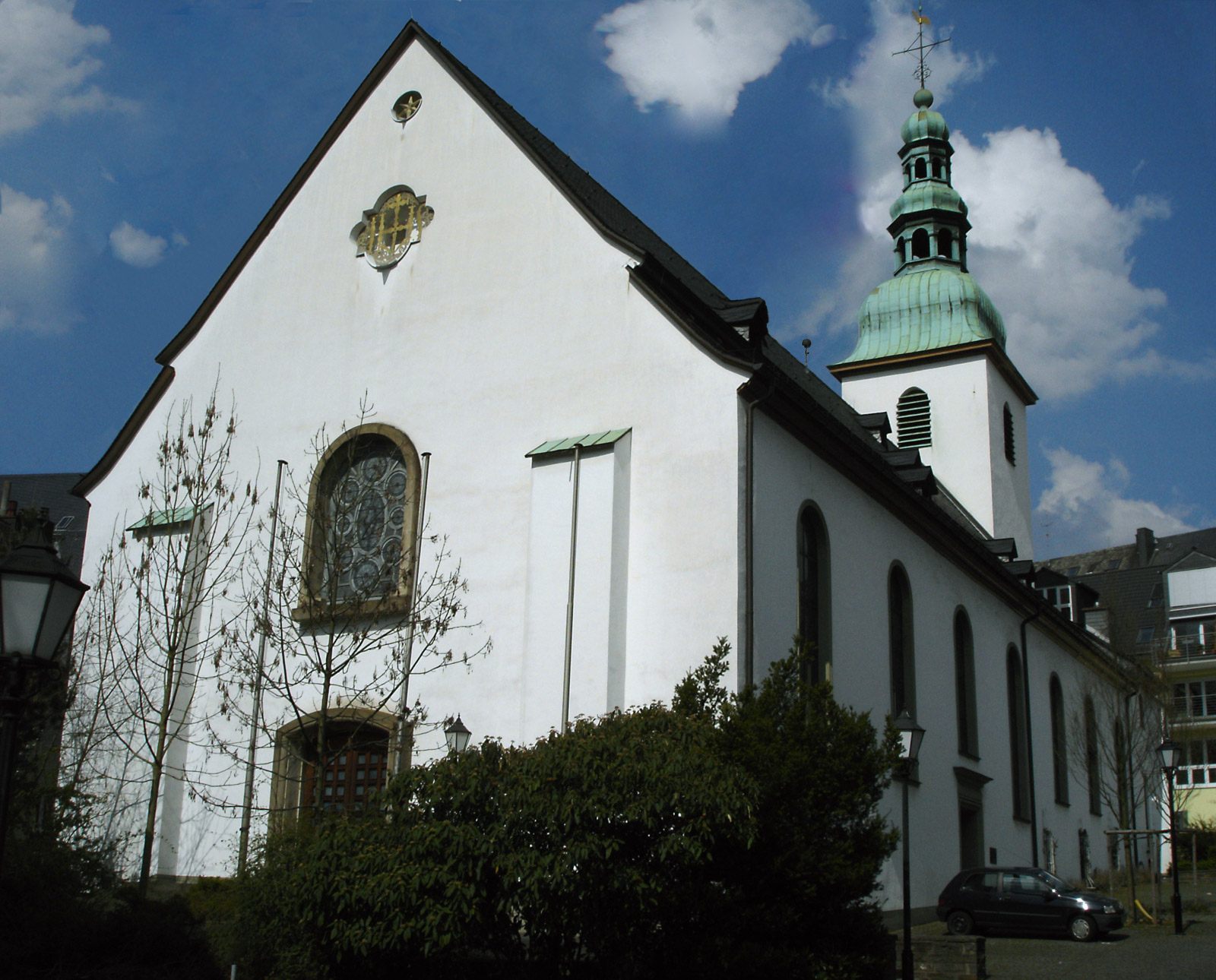
Marienkirche

The town of Siegen belonged in the beginning to the Archbishopric of Mainz, or more precisely to its deaconry of Arfeld. There was a White Nun convent in town that folded in the 15th century. Furthermore, there was a Franciscan Monastery that was dissolved in 1533 after the Nassau overlords had introduced the Reformation in 1530. After that, the town was first Lutheran, but in 1550, the Principality of Nassau converted to the Reformed Church. Subsequently, Siegen was a predominantly Protestant town, but not so strongly that the Counterreformation could not gain ground in 1623, with one fifth of the townsfolk and those living in the surrounding area becoming Catholic once again. As of 1626, there was once more a monastery in town, this time a Jesuit one. After passing to Prussia in 1815, the union between Lutheran and Reformed churches was introduced in Siegen, as it was throughout Prussia, but the town's parishes kept their Reformed emphasis. As part of the Westphalian Provincial Church (now the Church of Westphalia), Siegen became the seat of a Superintendency. A similar entity still exists in Siegen, known as the Kirchenkreis, or church district, to which all the city's parishes nowadays belong, unless they are Free Church parishes. This church district encompasses the whole of South Westphalia all the way to Olpe.

The town's Catholics, even after the Reformation, still belonged to the Archbishopric of Mainz. With the restructuring of the Catholic Church early in the 19th century, Siegen was assigned to the Archbishopric of Paderborn and became the seat of a district synod, today a deaconry, to which all the district's Catholic parishes belong. Paderborn was raised to Archbishopric in 1929.

Besides the Roman Catholic Church, Siegen also has a Greek Orthodox parish and a Romanian Orthodox parish.

Moreover, there are various free churches established in Siegen, among them several Evangelical Free Church parishes (Baptists), an Evangelical-Methodist Church, an Independent Evangelical-Lutheran Church (SELK), a Seventh-day Adventist parish, several Free Evangelical parishes (FeG), the Achenbach Christian Community, the Christian Assembly, Calvary Chapel and the Siegen-Meiswinkel Mission Community.

Further religious communities in Siegen are the Church of Jesus Christ of Latter-day Saints, the New Apostolic Church, the Jehovah's Witnesses, an Original Christianity community and Baháʼí. Moreover, owing to a great number of Turkish and Arab migrants in Siegen, the Muslim community is also very much in evidence there and there are several mosques in Siegen run by Turkish, Arab and Albanian communities. There are said to be more than 15,000 Muslims out of Siegen's total population.

=== Municipal reform ===
The following communities and rural areas have been amalgamated with Siegen:

- 1902 and 1912: parts of Buschgotthardshütten
- 1934: parts of Achenbach
- 1937: parts of Achenbach and Buschgotthardshütten
- 1966: Trupbach, Seelbach, Breitenbach, Bürbach, Kaan-Marienborn and Volnsberg
- 1969: Feuersbach
- 1974: towns of Hüttental and Eiserfeld

=== Population development ===
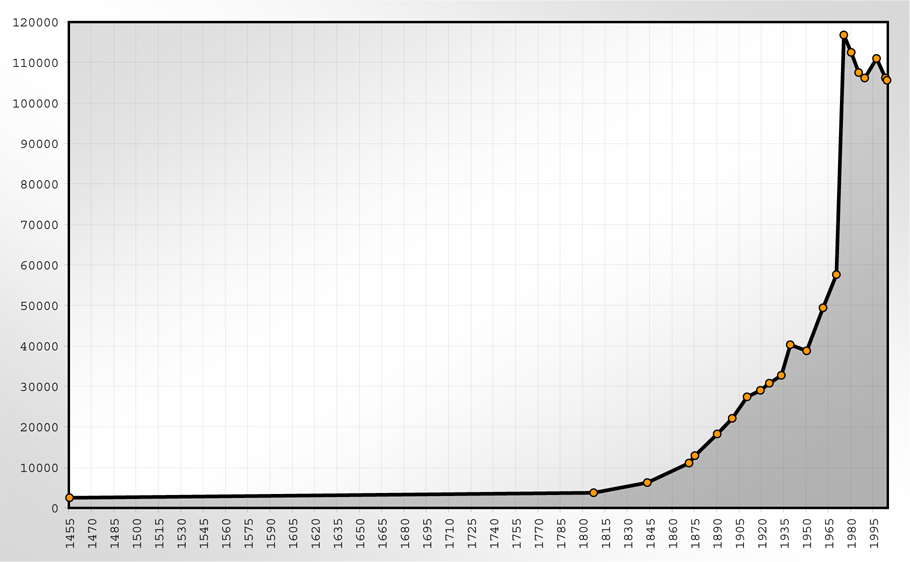
Population development

In 1897, Siegen had 20,000 inhabitants. By 1939, this figure had doubled to 40,000. In the World War II, the town lost roughly 30% of its inhabitants (12,000). The population had fallen to 28,000 by 1945 and only in 1952 did it once again reach prewar levels.

On 1 January 1975, Siegen's population surpassed 100,000 through the amalgamation of Hüttental (38,867 inhabitants in 1974) and Eiserfeld (22,354 inhabitants in 1974), making it a city. With 117,224 inhabitants it also at the same time reached its all-time highest population. At the end of June 2005, according to the North Rhine-Westphalia State Office for Data Processing and Statistics (Landesamt für Datenverarbeitung und Statistik Nordrhein-Westfalen), 105,328 people made Siegen their main abode. Since 1975, the population has fallen by roughly 10% (12,000).

The following chart shows population figures for Siegen's municipal area, however big it was at each given time. Up to 1833, most figures are estimates, and thereafter census figures (¹) or official estimates by the statistical office of the time or the town/city administration itself. The given figures indicate from 1843 the "population present in the town" (Ort Anwesende Bevölkerung), from 1925 the "dwelling population" (Wohnbevölkerung), and since 1987 the "Population in the place of main residence" (Bevölkerung am Ort der Hauptwohnung). Before 1843, population figures come from irregular surveying procedures.

Historical population

Year	Pop.	±% p.a.
1455	2,500	—
1807	3,743	+0.11%
1840	6,074	+1.48%
1855	7,035	+0.98%
1867	10,100	+3.06%
1871	11,067	+2.31%
1880	15,100	+3.51%
1885	16,676	+2.01%
1890	18,242	+1.81%
1895	19,303	+1.14%
1900	22,109	+2.75%
1905	25,201	+2.65%
1910	27,416	+1.70%
1917	25,549	−1.00%
1925	30,951	+2.43%
1933	32,736	+0.70%
1939	40,269	+3.51%

Year	Pop.	±% p.a.
1946	29,922	−4.15%
1950	38,787	+6.70%
1956	45,173	+2.57%
1961	49,404	+1.81%
1965	118,012	+24.32%
1970	119,428	+0.24%
1975	116,553	−0.49%
1980	112,331	−0.74%
1985	107,429	−0.89%
1990	109,174	+0.32%
1995	111,398	+0.40%
2000	108,476	−0.53%
2005	106,293	−0.41%
2010	103,424	−0.55%
2015	102,355	−0.21%
2020	101,943	−0.08%
2025	102,450	+0.10%

Source: Landesdatabank Nordrhein-Westfalen (1965-2025)

== Politics ==
=== Mayor ===
The current mayor of Siegen is Tristan Vitt of the Social Democratic Party (SPD).

Previous mayoral election was held on 13 September 2020 and the results were as follows:

Candidate	Party	Votes	%
Steffen Mues	Christian Democratic Union	22,807	57.6
Ingmar Schiltz	Social Democratic Party	6,525	16.5
Michael Groß	Alliance 90/The Greens	5,402	13.6
Henning Zoz	Alternative for Germany	3,031	7.7
Melanie Becker	The Left	1,847	4.7
Valid votes		39,612	98.6
Invalid votes		555	1.4
Total		40,167	100.0
Electorate/voter turnout		80,568	49.9
Source: City of Siegen

At the city's helm since the 13th century, there have been several mayors of whom evidence survives. In 1304 and 1305, a council ("consules") was mentioned for the first time. As early as 1224, however, documents mention Burgmänner ("Castle Men") as well as three Bürgermeister ("Mayors") who were changed yearly. As of 1500, only two mayors were chosen every year. In the 18th century, the guilds were achieving ever greater influence in the town. Thereafter the "ruling" or "office-holding" old shoemaking master represented the "common townsfolk" on the council. The mediaeval town charter was kept right up until 1809, and parts of it even held until 1815, but that year there was a self-endorsing council with 12 members, over which presided the mayor. As of 1824, the suburbs got their own chief administrator who was subordinate to the mayor of Siegen. In 1836, the Prussian municipal system was introduced. After the town was separated from Siegen district in 1923, the mayor was given the title Oberbürgermeister (roughly equivalent to Lord Mayor). The mayor who came to office in 1919 kept his position right through the time of the Third Reich, whereas some mayors in other German and Austrian towns, whose political views were at odds with the Nazis', were removed forcibly.

After the Second World War, the military government of the British Zone of Occupation installed a new mayor, and in 1946 it introduced a new town charter based on a British model, leading to a "Council of the town" elected by the people, whose members were called Stadtverordnete (town councillors). In the beginning, the council chose one from its midst as the mayor as the town's head and representative, which was an honorary function. Furthermore, as of 1946, the council also began choosing a full-time Oberstadtdirektor, or Higher Town Director, to lead the town's administration.

After Siegen was reunited with the district of the same name in 1975, these two officials bore the titles Bürgermeister and Stadtdirektor respectively. In 1999, this two-headed arrangement was forsaken in favour of a single city leader, with the title Bürgermeister, who serves as chairman or chairwoman of city council, leader of city administration and city representative. The mayor is directly elected.

Mayors (Bürgermeister and Oberbürgermeister) since 1919

- 1919–1945: Alfred Fißmer, Oberbürgermeister
- 1945: Fritz Fries, Oberbürgermeister
- 1945–1946: Otto Schwarz, Oberbürgermeister
- 1946–1948: Ernst Weißelberg, Oberbürgermeister
- 1948–1956: Ernst Bach, Oberbürgermeister
- 1956–1961: Erich Pachnicke, Oberbürgermeister
- 1961–1966: Karl Eckmann, Oberbürgermeister
- 1966–1975: Karl Althaus, Oberbürgermeister
- 1975–1979: Friedemann Keßler, Bürgermeister
- 1979–1990: Hans Reinhardt, Bürgermeister
- 1990–1994: Hilde Fiedler, Bürgermeisterin
- 1994–1999: Karl Wilhelm Kirchhöfer, Bürgermeister
- 1999–2007: Ulf Stötzel (CDU), Bürgermeister
- 2007–2025: Steffen Mues (CDU), Bürgermeister
- 2025–today: Tristan Vitt (SPD), Bürgermeister

Stadtdirektoren and Oberstadtdirektoren 1946–1999

- 1946–1954: Max Baumann, Oberstadtdirektor
- 1954–1975: Kurt Seibt, Oberstadtdirektor
- 1975–1985: Hans Mohn, Stadtdirektor
- 1985–1989: Volker Oerter, Stadtdirektor
- 1989–1995: Otto-Werner Rappold, Stadtdirektor (left office early with effect on 2 December 1995 by his own wish)
- 1995–1999: Ulrich Mock, Stadtdirektor (at first as Dr. Rappold's General Agent until 31 January 1997, then appointed fulltime Stadtdirektor)

=== City council ===
Results of the 2020 city council election

The Siegen city council governs the city alongside the Mayor. The most recent city council election was held on 13 September 2020, and the results were as follows:

Party	Votes	%	+/-	Seats	+/-
Christian Democratic Union (CDU)	12,366	31.3	▼3.3	22	▼1
Social Democratic Party (SPD)	8,582	21.7	▼7.1	15	▼4
Alliance 90/The Greens (Grüne)	6,704	17.0	▲5.4	12	▲4
Independent Voters' Association (UWG)	3,172	8.0	▼0.2	6	▲1
Alternative for Germany (AfD)	2,877	6.3	▲2.5	5	▲2
Free Democratic Party (FDP)	2,481	6.3	▲0.3	4	±0
The Left (Die Linke)	2,000	5.1	▼1.0	4	±0
Volt Germany (Volt)	1,187	3.0	New	2	New
Independent Bach	171	0.4	New	0	New
Independent Schulte	15	0.0	New	0	New
Valid votes	39,555	98.6			
Invalid votes	553	1.4			
Total	40,108	100.0		70	▲4
Electorate/voter turnout	80,568	49.8			
Source: City of Siegen

Historical composition of the city council
Year	CDU	SPD	Grüne	UWG	AfD	FDP	Linke	Volt	Other	Total
2020	22	15	12	6	5	4	4	2	–	70
2014	23	19	8	5	3	4	4	–	–	66
2009	25	18	9	4	–	8	4	–	2	70
2004	25	18	7	6	–	5	–	–	1	62

=== Coat of arms ===
Siegen's civic coat of arms might be described thus: Argent a town wall embattled gules with an open gateway argent, therein in an inescutcheon azure a lion rampant Or armed and langued gules, issuant from the wall a bishop in robe and mitre azure (trimmed in argent) holding in his hand dexter a crozier argent with crook Or sinister, in his hand sinister, upraised, an open book argent with pages edged gules.

The bishop in the city's arms is the Bishop of Cologne. The wall symbolizes the city itself, and the inescutcheon in the gateway shows the Lion of Nassau in blue and gold (or yellow), which are Nassau's colours. The arms are based on the oldest known town seal, from 1248. The inescutcheon once also had gold billets (upright rectangles) around the lion, but these do not appear in what became the town's (and later city's) coat of arms in 1875.

== Sights ==
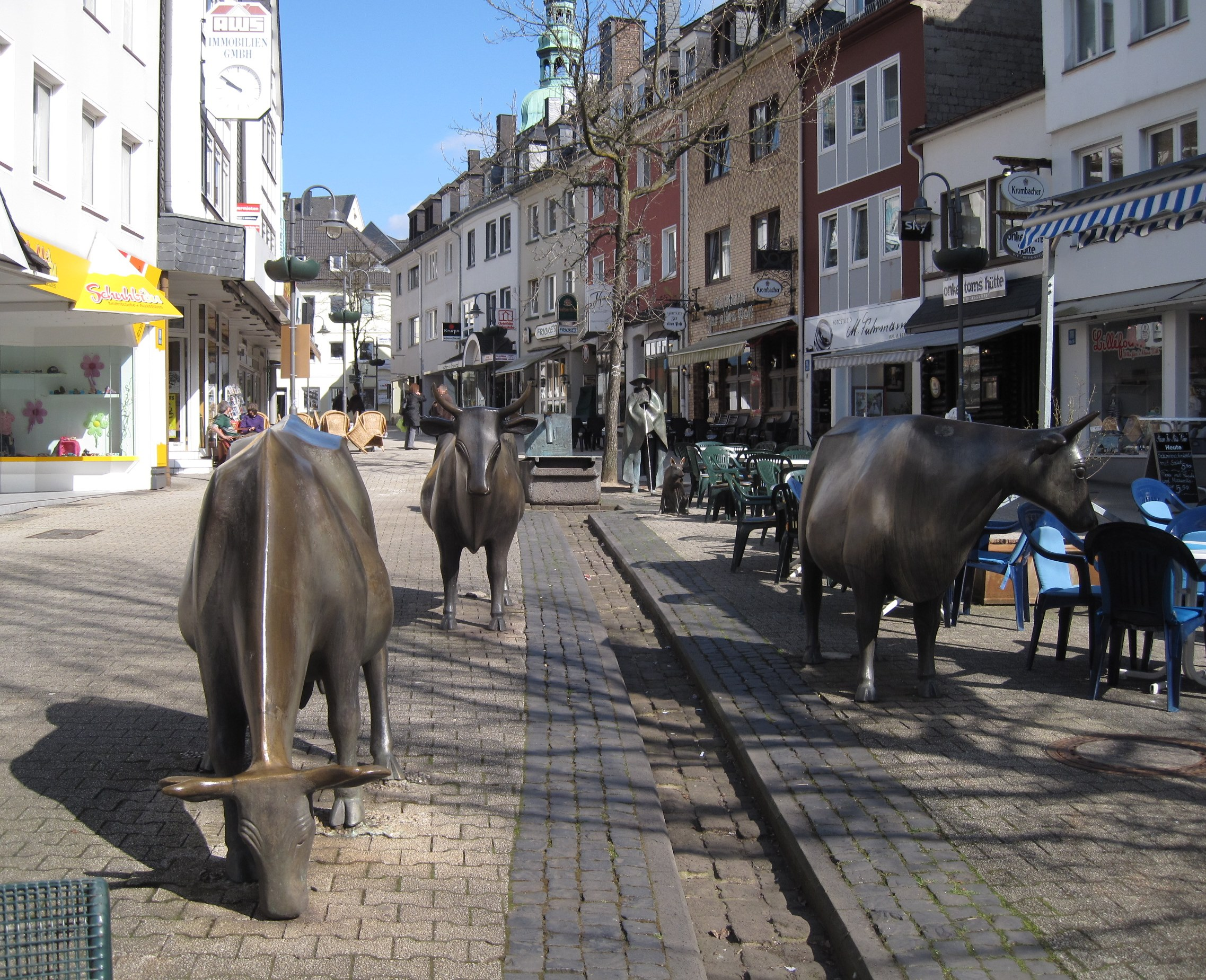
Siegen pedestrian zone

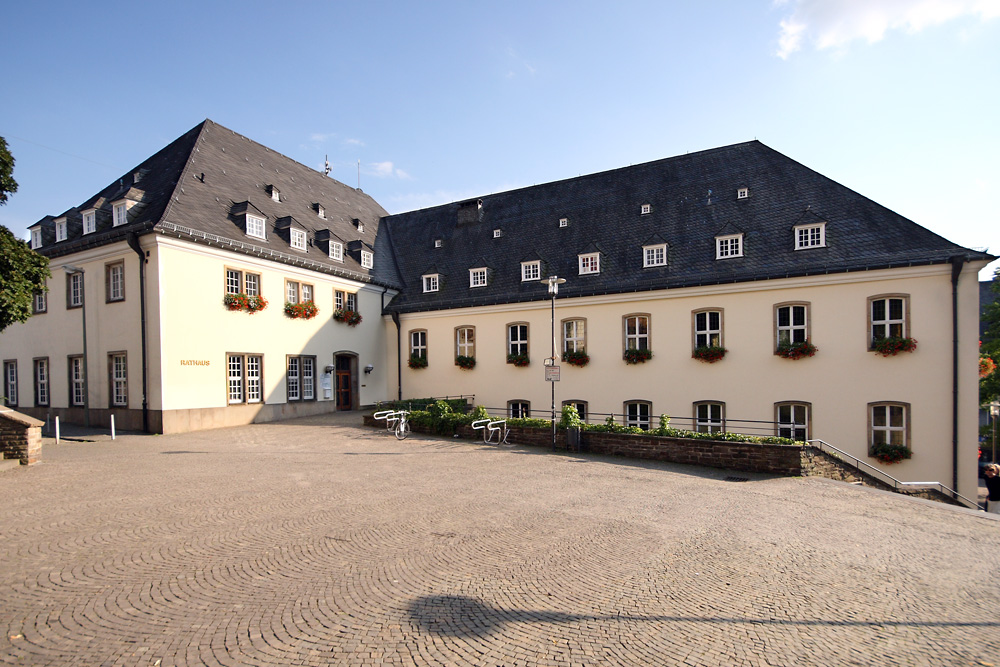
City hall

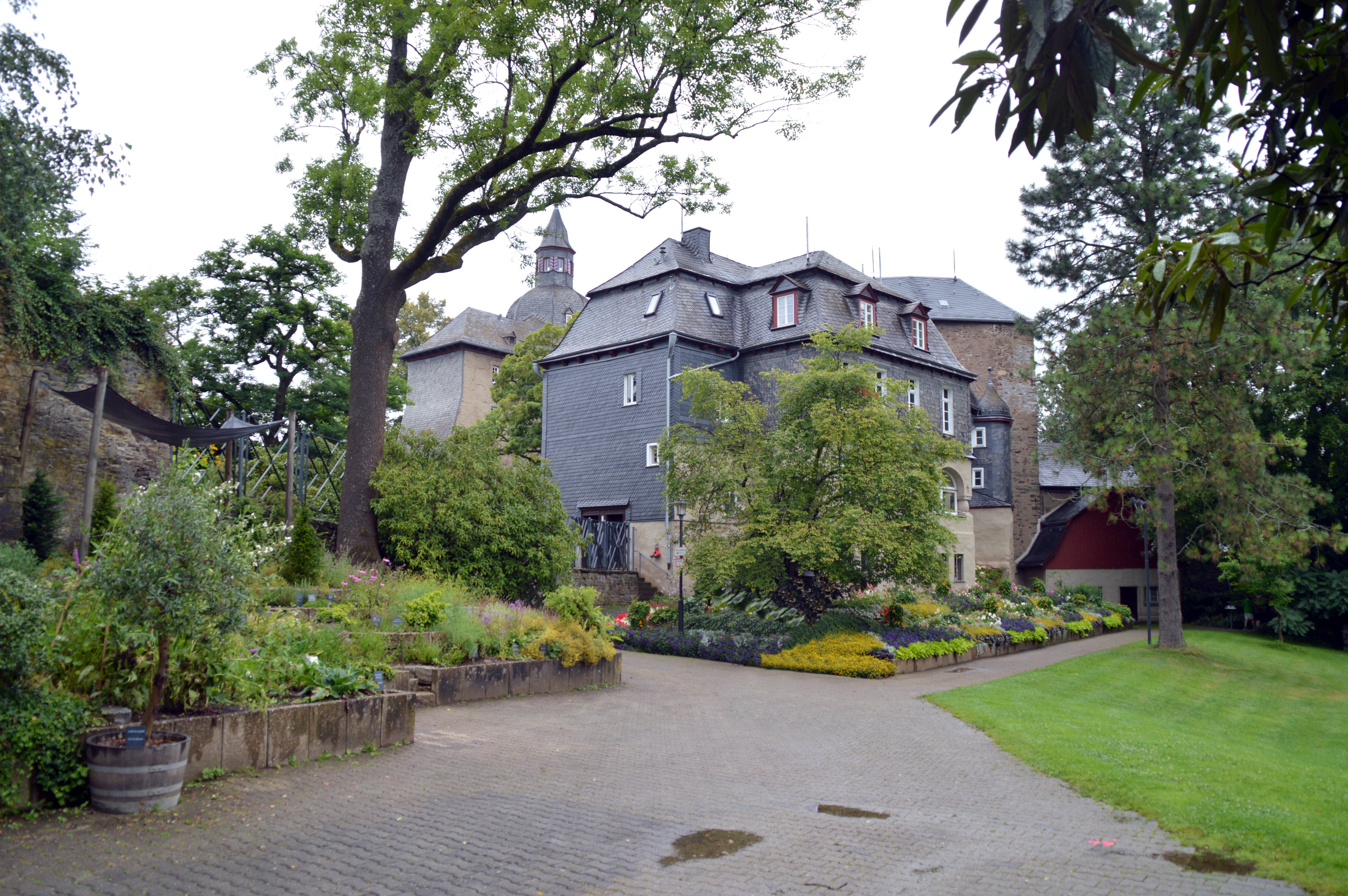
Oberes Schloss

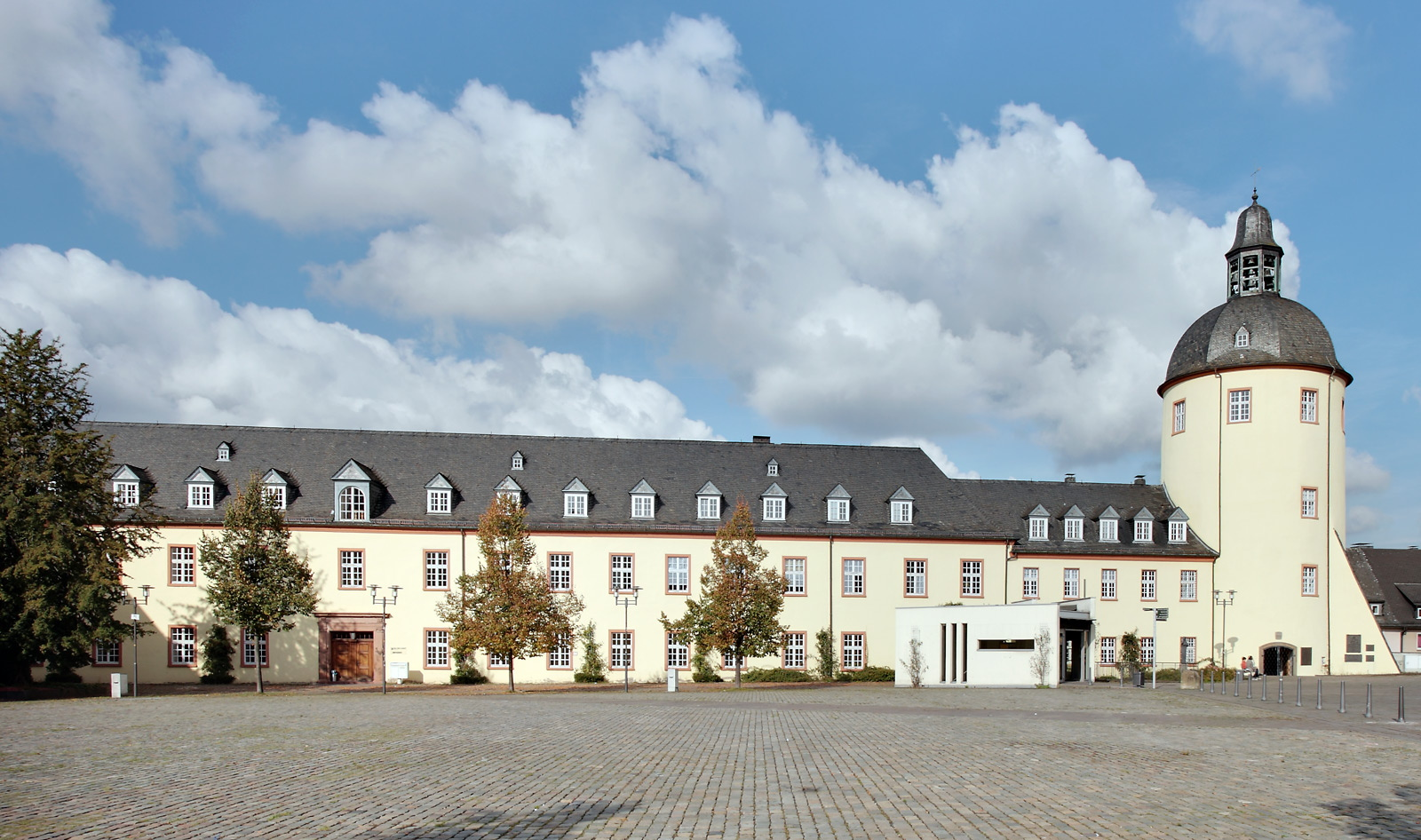
Part of Unteres Schloss with the "Fat Tower"

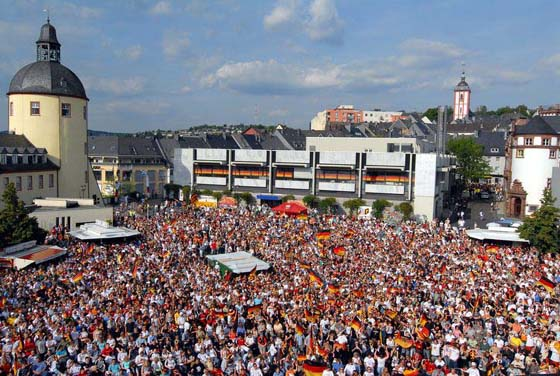
Schloss Square during the opening 2006 World Cup match

Although the town was about 80% destroyed in the World War II, Siegen has kept a number of buildings worth seeing, such as the two stately homes, the Oberes Schloss and the Unteres Schloss.

=== Oberes Schloss ===
The castle on the Siegberg was first mentioned in a document in 1259 and was the family seat of the House of Nassau. Since 1905, the Siegerland Museum has been here. Alongside regional exhibits – among them an artificial demonstration mine – are many paintings. The centrepiece of this collection is made up of works by the man who is arguably the best known native, Peter Paul Rubens. There is also quite a comprehensive collection of portraits of members of the Houses of Nassau and Orange. The top floor is devoted to 19th-century home décor. A kitchen from the Siegerland, a bedroom and many pieces of furniture from the Biedermeier era give one an impression of life in the region in bygone days.

=== Unteres Schloss ===
Late in the 17th century, the Lower Stately Home came into being in its current form, somewhat like an open rectangle. The Protestant line of the House of Nassau-Siegen resided here. Also belonging to the Schloss is the "Dicker Turm", or "Fat Tower" with a carillon. In 1959, the then town of Siegen built a memorial for victims of war and tyranny. Inside the Schloss is also found the crypt of the Evangelical branch of the Nassau princely house.

Today, the Schloss serves as a state authority building in which the North Rhine-Westphalia Building and Property Establishment, the State Environment Office, the Office for Occupational Health and Safety and the Attendorn Correctional Facility (Siegen Branch Facility) are all housed. By the city's plans, a university is supposed to move into the Unteres Schloss within the next few years, but at this time, the plan is failing to find any financial backing.

=== Churches ===
Two churches in downtown Siegen are to be brought to the visitor's attention: The Martinikirche dating from the 11th century and the Nikolaikirche at the marketplace with its unusual eight-sided shape and its golden Krönchen ("coronet") – the city's landmark – on the church tower, which is a prominent feature of Siegen's skyline (Siegen is sometimes called Krönchenstadt for this unusual feature). Another church is the Marienkirche, built by the Jesuits between 1702 and 1729. Also worth seeing are Siegen's Old Town and several museums in the city core.

=== Gasometer ===
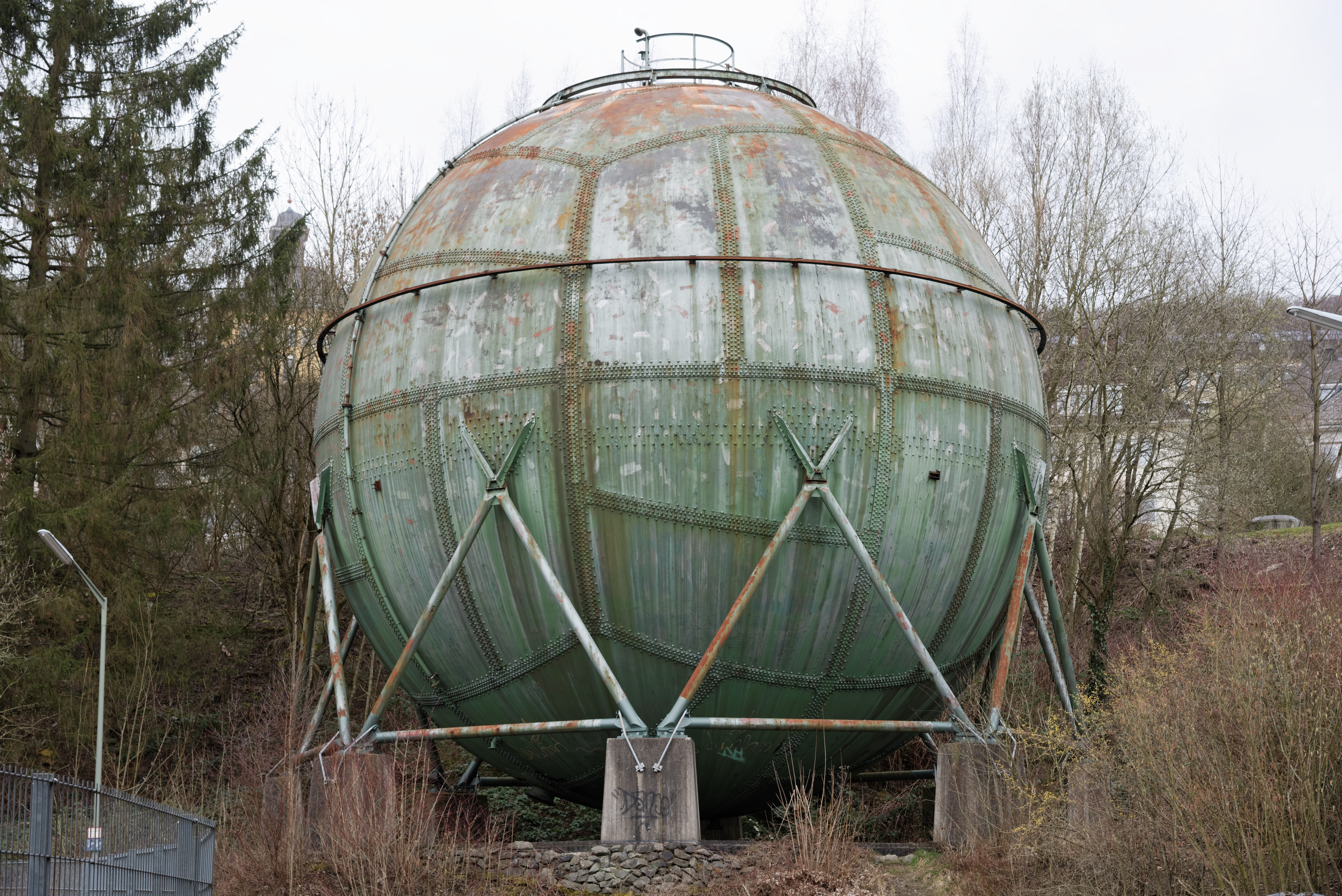
Protected gas holder

In the southwest of the city core, at the foot of the Ziegenberg, is a spherical gas holder, or gasometer, which is protected by law as a monument. It is one of the oldest spherical gas holders still preserved. Another peculiarity is its riveted casing. Only three other such gas holders are known to exist worldwide (all in Germany, in Schwerte, Offenburg and Bielefeld). The holder had to be moved a few metres owing to construction on the municipal Autobahn, the Hüttentalstraße, and in the residential area of Ziegenberg, and it now forms the symbolic sun as part of a scale model of the planets above the gas holder.

=== Cemeteries ===
Within Siegen's city limits are 36 municipally run cemeteries. Ten of them are already closed and are available for burials only because of existing laws. The cemeteries have a total area of 730 000 m^{2} with roughly 65,000 graves. Characteristic of regional cemeteries are hillside graves and a green, parklike layout that even affords wildlife a chance at reoccupying the land.

Cemeteries within city limits are:

- Lindenbergfriedhof
- Hermelsbacher Friedhof
- Stockfriedhof
- Geisweider Friedhof
- Haardter Friedhof
- Gilbergfriedhof
- Friedhof Kaan-Marienborn
- Neuer Friedhof Niederschelden

== Culture ==
=== Theatre ===
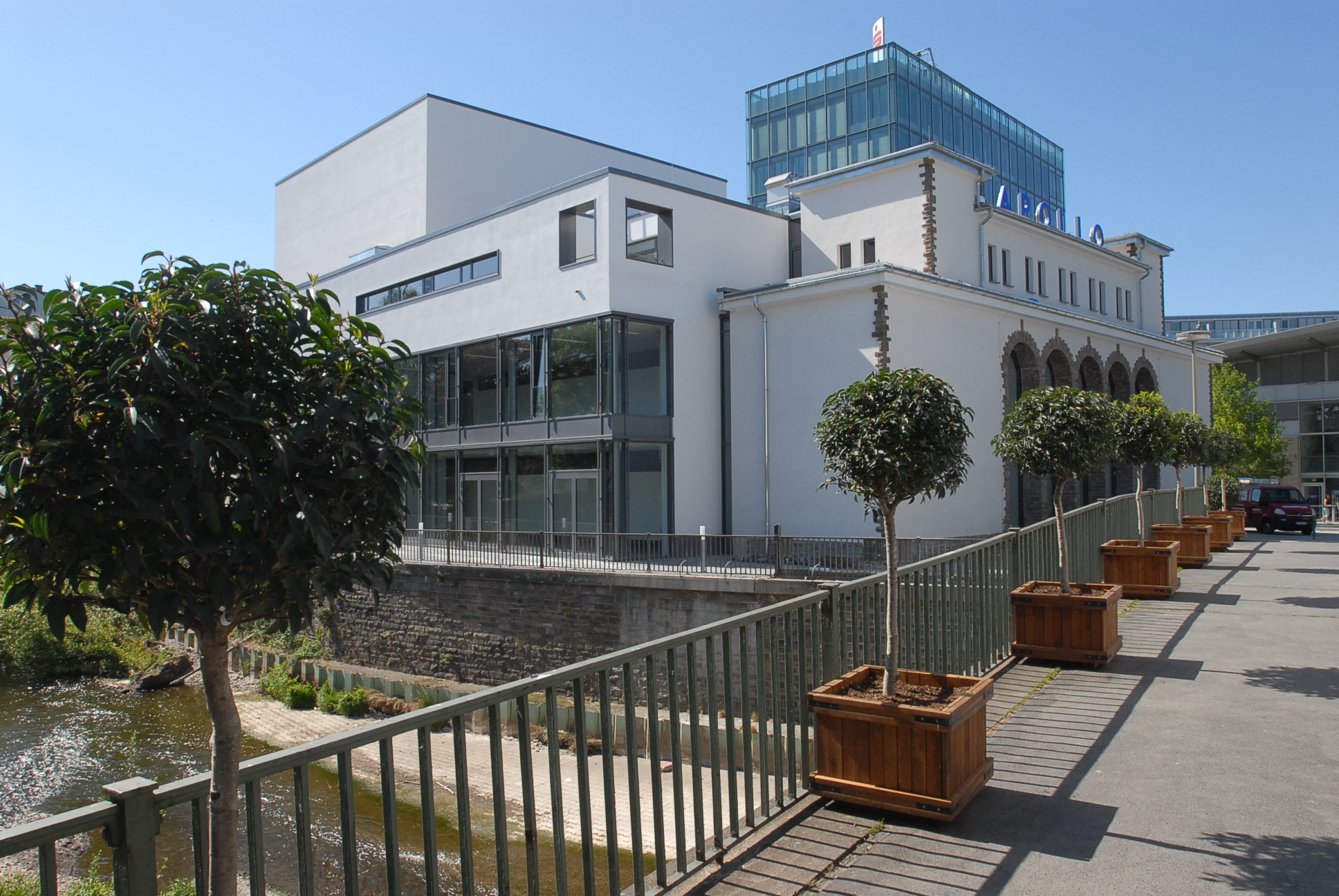
Apollo-Theater

In the Apollo-Theater (a downtown former 1930s cinema that underwent remodelling and opened in mid-2007), Siegen has one of the current decade's most important newly built theatres. A controlling interest in this venture is held by TheaterSiegen intendant Magnus Reitschuster.

Since 1992, the media and cultural house Lÿz has been a venue for cabaret, music and theatre in Siegen. On the two stages, roughly 150 events appear every season.

Bigger events take place at the Bühne der Stadt ("City's Stage", with about 820 seats), the Siegerlandhalle (1 800 m^{2}, 2,300 seats) or the Bismarckhalle. As well, there are regular open-air concerts and productions in the inner yard at Unteres Schloss.

=== Orchestras and choirs ===
- Philharmonie Südwestfalen
- Evangelische Kantorei Siegen
- Bach-Chor Siegen
- Sängerkreis Siegerland

=== Museums ===
The main centre of art in Siegen are the Museum for Contemporary Art and the Haus Seel – city gallery.

The Siegerland Museum is dedicated to regional history. The Oranienstraße House, built at 1900 in the Italian country house style, is attached to the Siegerland Museum since 1993 as an exhibit forum. There is a varied program of temporary exhibitions of all kinds, from archaeological excavations to contemporary avant-garde art. Poet and author readings are also part of the program, such as classic concerts.

In Geisweid is found the Beatles Home Museum, run by Harold Krämer. According to the 2000 Guinness Book of Records, the 27 m^{2} museum is the smallest public museum in the world devoted to the four Liverpudlian musicians. The collection holds more than 17,000 recordings, souvenirs, film posters, and autographs and other memorabilia.

=== Regular events ===
- Early in the year: SILA (Siegerlandausstellung – Siegerland Exhibition), even-numbered years only
- March to November, first Saturday in each month: Flea market in Siegen-Geisweid (since 1970), no new goods
- June to August: "Mittwochs in" different bands every Wednesday in Siegen-Weidenau
- June: Johannimarkt, a fair held for some 400 years
- June/July: Siegener Sommerfestival, plays, cabaret, theatre, music and cinema since about 1990. (In 2006, instead of the traditional summer festival, a World Cup festival was held)
- July: Stadtfest (City Festival), even-numbered years only
- July: Rubensfest, odd-numbered years only
- August: Siegen Open-Air Cinema
- August: Christopher Street Day (CSD), since 2000
- August: Siegtal-Pur All streets only opened for bikes (the HTS (local Motorway) too)
- Summer: Street Festival at the Corn Market
- October: 2nd Sunday: Bürgerfest Geisweid
- November: Geisweider Adventsmarkt, since about 1985
- December: Christmas market, since about 1980

=== Dialect ===
The city and its surrounding region speak in addition to standard German also have a characteristic local dialect: Siegerländisch.

=== Tales and legends ===
The Dilldappe is an old mythical creature from the Siegerland. It lives mainly in the Siegerland Hauberg (coöperatively managed woodlots). Early in the 1980s, the writer and cartoonist Matthias Kringe first published a calendar about the creature, written in the local dialect of German.

=== The Rubens Prize of the City of Siegen ===
The Rubens Prize of the City of Siegen, founded in 1955, is awarded every five years to a painter or graphic artist whose life's work has been groundbreaking on the European stage. The title recalls the painter-diplomat Peter Paul Rubens, who expressed in his life's work the thought of European unity, long before it could become a political reality. Peter Paul Rubens – who was born in Siegen, grew up in Cologne and Antwerp, trained in art in Italy, was esteemed in France and acted as a diplomat in Spain and England – as the main master of European Baroque painting set those artistic and European standards to which the awarding of the prize has been bound since 1957–1958.

Past prizewinners:

- Hans Hartung (1957/1958)
- Giorgio Morandi (1962)
- Francis Bacon (1967)
- Antoni Tàpies (1972)
- Fritz Winter (1977)
- Emil Schumacher (1982)
- Cy Twombly (1987)
- Rupprecht Geiger (1992)
- Lucian Freud (1997)
- Maria Lassnig (2002)
- Sigmar Polke (2007)
- Bridget Riley (2012)
- Niele Toroni (2017)

== Sport ==
The city sport league includes 160 sport clubs in which roughly 37,000 members are active. National importance was achieved in 2005 by the Sportfreunde Siegen men's football team at Leimbachstadion when they rose from the Regionalliga Süd up to the 2nd Bundesliga, although the next year they dropped back down again. As six-time German Champions, the TSV Siegen women's football team was very successful in the 1990s.

== Transport ==
=== Air transport ===
In the south of the district in the community of Burbach lies the Siegerland Airport. There are no scheduled services to other German cities. The airport is mainly used for general aviation and parachuting. The nearest international airports are Cologne Bonn Airport, located 88 km (55 mi) to the west and Frankfurt Airport, located 137 km (85 mi) to the south east of Siegen.

=== Bicycle transport ===
The city of Siegen lies on European long-distance path E1 running from the middle of Sweden to Umbria in Italy. There is, however, no organized cycling trail network in Siegen. Riding in bus lanes is sporadically allowed. Bicycle transport is generally poorly developed in Siegen. Owing to dual carriageways within the city and nearby, as well as transport planning that rather favours cars, bicycle transport has been somewhat thwarted. Together with the partly hilly topography, there is therefore little in the way of bicycle transport in Siegen.

=== Rail transport ===
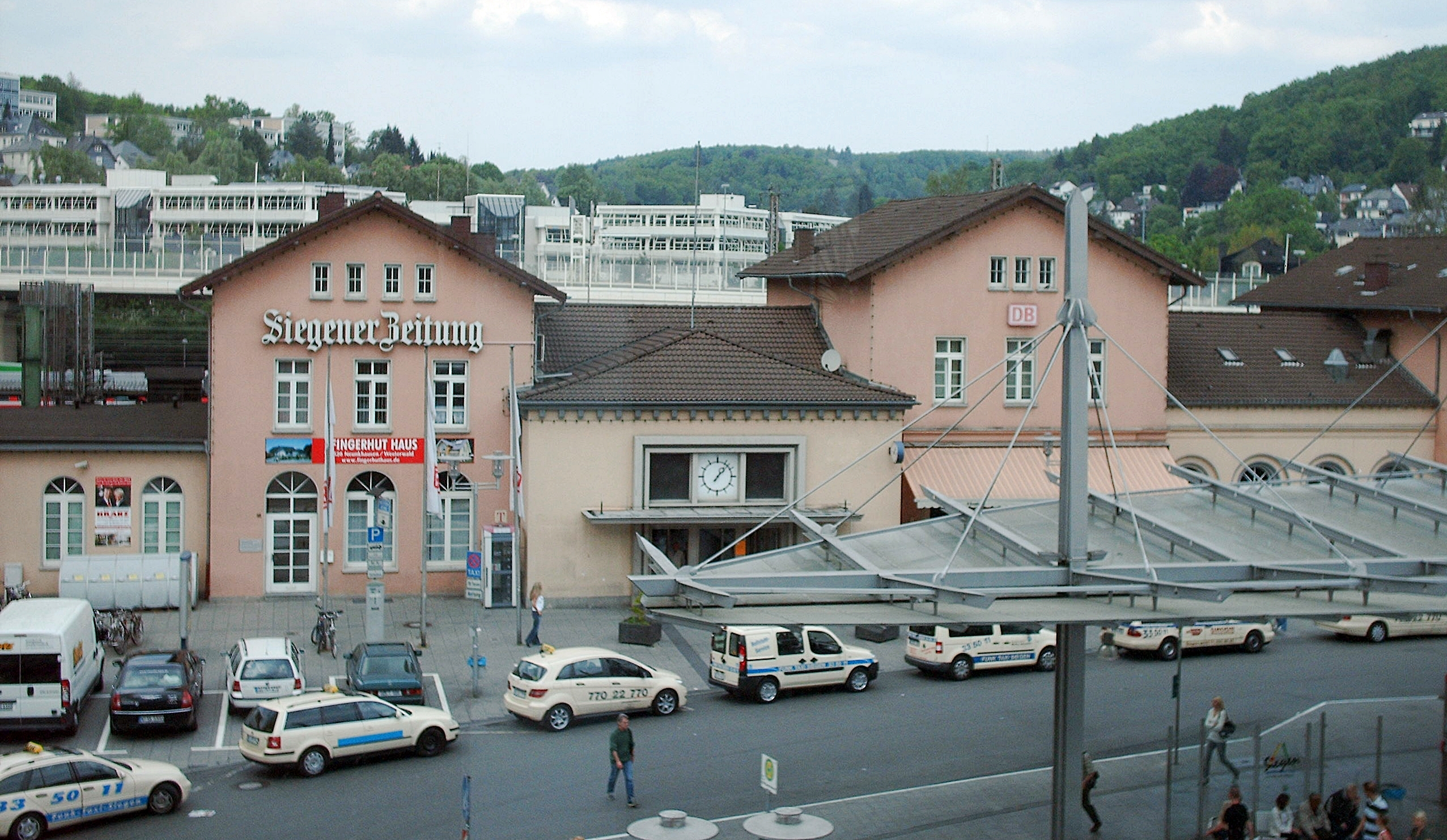
Siegen station

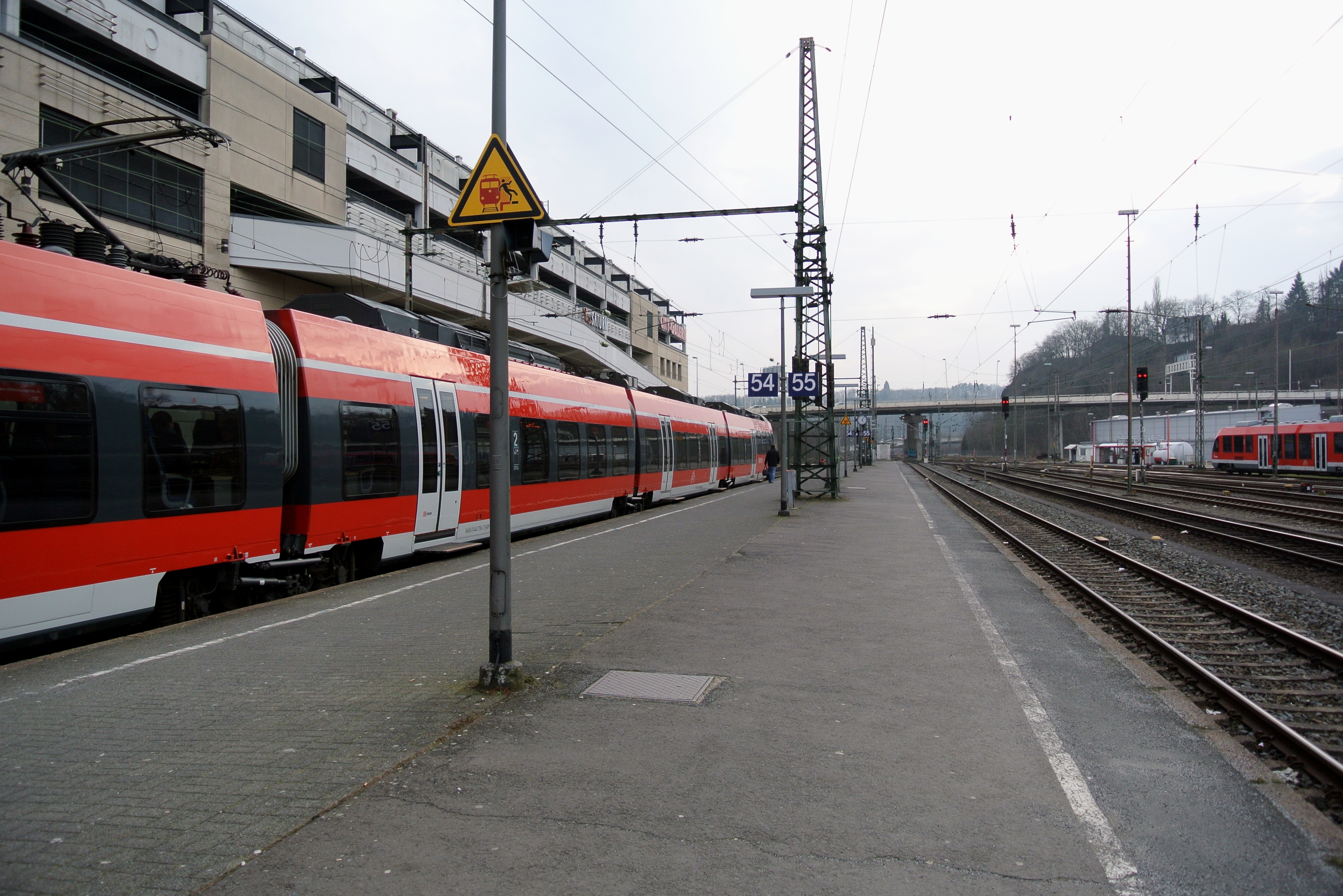
Tracks and Rhein-Sieg railway (Sieg line)

Siegen station lies at the junction of the following railway lines:

- The two-track electrified Ruhr–Sieg line (Ruhr-Sieg-Strecke) is used for regional services, usually hourly, of the Ruhr-Sieg-Express (RE 16) and the Ruhr-Sieg-Bahn (RB 91).
- The Rothaar Railway (Rothaarbahn) is served, usually hourly by Rothaar-Bahn (RB 93) services, connecting in Erndtebrück to Obere Lahntal-Bahn (RB 94/RMV Line 43) services, usually two-hourly, on the Upper Lahn Valley Railway (Obere Lahntal-Bahn).
- The two-track electrified Dill Railway (Dill-Strecke) is served, usually two-hourly, by the Rhein-Sieg-Express (RE 9) and the Main-Sieg-Express (RE 99) and hourly by the Sieg-Dill-Bahn (RB 95) (only to and from Dillenburg).
- The mostly two-track electrified Sieg line (Siegstrecke) is served, usually hourly, by the Rhein-Sieg-Express (RE 9) and Sieg-Dill-Bahn (RB 95) services (only to and from Au).

RB90, RB93 and RB95 are operated by DreiLänderBahn, a section of Hessische Landesbahn (HLB).

=== Bus transport ===
Westfalen-Tarif

On 18 March 1895, the Netphener Omnibusgesellschaft opened the world's first busline using a petrol-powered omnibus, running a service from its base in Netphen to Siegen and Deuz. Today, local road transport offers many regional, express and local buses, along with a night bus service connecting Siegen with its outlying communities and neighbouring towns. They are run by the South Westphalia Transport Services (Verkehrsbetriebe Westfalen-Süd; VWS) whose headquarters are in Siegen.

For the whole of local public transport, the tariff of the South Westphalia Transport Community (Verkehrsgemeinschaft Westfalen-Süd; VGWS) applies, regardless of the North Rhine-Westphalia tariff.

Siegen is located in the area of the fare association Westfalen-Tarif.

=== Roads ===
With regard to long-distance roads, the city of Siegen is connected to Autobahnen A 45 (Dortmund – Aschaffenburg) and A 4 (Cologne – Olpe), and to Federal Highways (Bundesstraßen) 54, 54n, 62 and 62n.

Siegen is home to the tallest bridge of the A 45 and one of the highest in Germany, the Siegtalbrücke. Built from 1964 to 1969, it is approximately 96 m high and 1 050 m long.

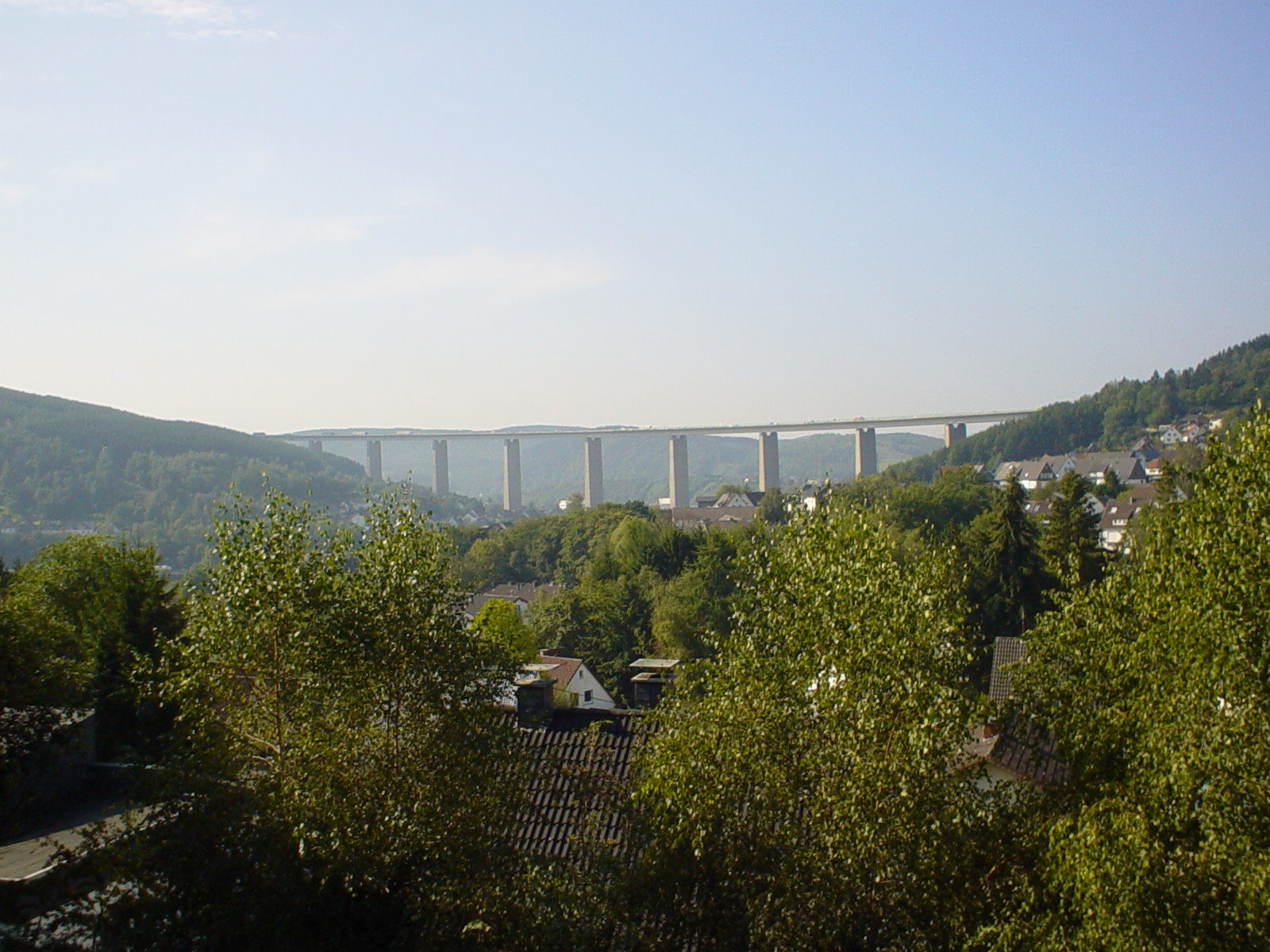
The Siegtalbrücke as seen from Alte Dreisbach in Siegen

The shape that the city takes has much to do with the Hüttentalstraße (HTS) (Federal Highways 54n and 62n) which serves as a municipal Autobahn – much of it elevated – that runs through the city area.

The B54 Highway between Wenden and Kreuztal has been newly built. In the heights over Kreuztal's outlying community of Krombach, it now joins with the HTS. On this 12-kilometre stretch of highway are eight valley bridges as well as ten under- and overpasses. This new part was opened on 1 December 2007.

== Economy ==
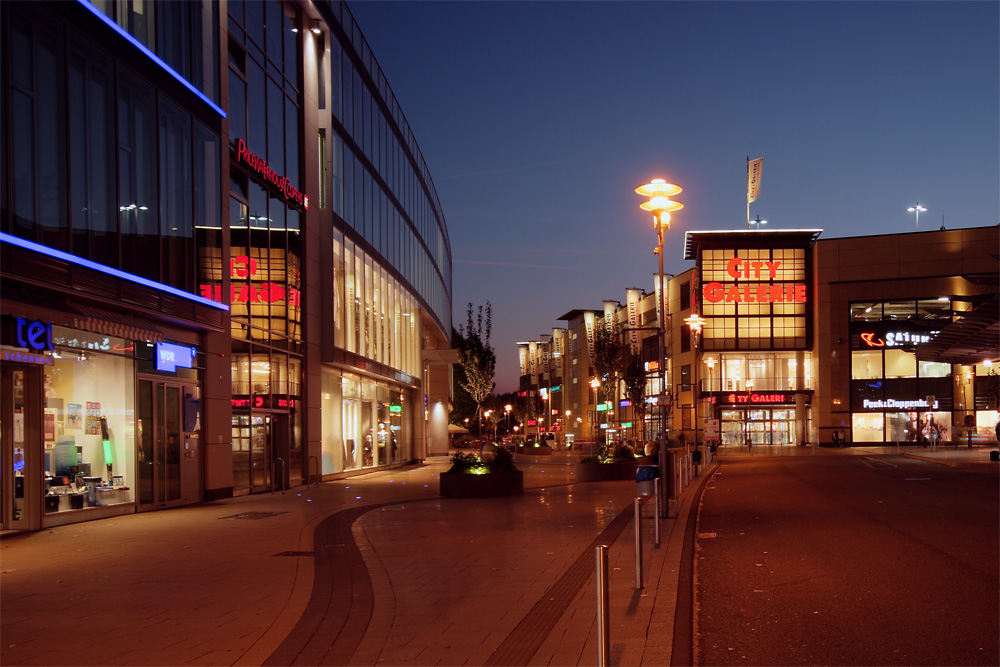
Shopping centres Sieg Carré and City-Galerie

Siegen is South Westphalia's service and administrative centre. Much of its industry is based on metalworking.

Pedestrian precincts in Bahnhofsstraße ("Railway Station Street") and Kölner Tor ("Cologne Gate"), both downtown, have made shopping in Siegen very convenient, as have the shopping centres City-Galerie (opened in 1998) and Sieg Carré (opened in 2006, both downtown) and Siegerlandzentrum (Siegen-Weidenau), and the Marburger Straße shopping street (downtown). In 2005, an IKEA store and a Peek & Cloppenburg location opened.

=== Public institutions ===
Siegen is home to the Siegen-Wittgenstein district administration and location of a Chamber of Industry and Trade (Industrie- und Handelskammer, or IHK, one of 81 such regional institutions in Germany) for the districts of Siegen-Wittgenstein and Olpe.

Home to the Siegen State Court, a local court and a labour court, the city is also an important court centre.

=== Media ===
In Siegen, the Westdeutscher Rundfunk (WDR) maintains a studio where regional radio and television news for South Westphalia is produced. The daily broadcast goes out in the "South Westphalia" regional window following the programme Aktuelle Stunde (a newsmagazine show) on WDR's third channel. Moreover, WDR also runs a transmission facility for VHF radio and television (once also medium wave) at the Giersberg.

Daily newspapers in Siegen include not only the Siegener Zeitung but also local editions of the Westfälische Rundschau and the Westfalenpost. All three appear in the morning, although the first was until 2000 an afternoon paper. Furthermore, at the "Obergraben" is found the regional, Radio-NRW-connected Radio Siegen's studio building.

== Education ==
In the early decades of the 17th century, the Herborn Academy temporarily relocated to Siegen, in the buildings of the Unteres Schloss, which came to an end when the Plague broke out.

Siegen's oldest school is the Gymnasium am Löhrtor, a grammar school. Other Schools:

=== Grammar schools ===
- Gymnasium am Löhrtor (GAL)
- Fürst-Johann-Moritz-Gymnasium (FJM)
- Peter-Paul-Rubens-Gymnasium, formerly known as Ganztagsgymnasium am Rosterberg
- Evangelisches Gymnasium (EV)
- Gymnasium auf der Morgenröthe (GAM)

=== Primary schools ===
- Albert Schweitzer Schule
- Birlenbacher Schule
- Burgschule
- Diesterwegschule
- Dreisbachschule
- Eiserner Schule
- Fischbacherbergschule
- Friedrich Flender Schule
- Geisweider Schule
- Giersbergschule
- Glückaufschule
- Gosenbacher Schule
- Grundschule Eiserfeld
- Grundschule Kaan-Marienborn
- Hammerhütter Schule
- Hüttentalschule
- Jung Stilling Schule
- Lindenbergschule
- Nordschule
- Obenstruthschule
- Sonnenhangschule
- Spandauer Schule

=== Higher education ===
Siegen is headquarters of the University of Siegen, founded on 1 August 1972 as the Gesamthochschule Siegen.

As well, the FOM University of Applied Sciences has a study centre, which is shared with the Academy of Administration and Economics.

Siegen also has various general-education and professional schools, and the Siegerlandkolleg.

== Twin towns – sister cities ==
Siegen is twinned with:

- Spandau (Berlin), Germany (1952)
- Katwijk, Netherlands (1963, formerly Rijnsburg)
- Leeds, England, United Kingdom (1966, formerly Morley
- Ypres, Belgium (1967)
- Zakopane, Poland (1989)
- Plauen, Germany (1990)

== Notable people ==
- Henry III of Nassau-Breda (1483–1538), Count of Nassau and Lord of Breda
- Tilemann Stella (1525–1589), Renaissance scholar and librarian, mathematician, geometerer, cartographer and astronomer
- John VII ‘the Middle’ of Nassau-Siegen (1561–1623), Count of Nassau-Siegen and military theorist
- Peter Paul Rubens (1577–1640), Baroque painter
- Johann Heinrich Bisterfeld (1605–1655), philosopher, polyhistor
- Georg Wilhelm de Gennin (1676–1750), Russian military officer and engineer; baptized here
- Franz Hunolt (1691–1746), Jesuit, theologian
- Adolph Diesterweg (1790–1866), pedagogue and mastermind of reform education
- Heinrich Kreutz (1854–1907), astronomer and publisher
- Charles H. Daub (1855–1917), member of the Wisconsin State Assembly
- Fritz Busch (1890–1951), conductor
- Adolf Busch (1891–1952), German-Swiss violinist and conductor
- Walter Kraemer (1892–1941), politician (KPD) and resistance fighter against Nazism
- Paul Giesler (1895–1945), Nazi functionary, Premier of Bavaria
- Heinrich Gontermann (1896–1917), fighter ace
- Friedrich Middelhauve (1896–1966), publisher and politician (FDP)
- Hermann Giesler (1898–1987), architect
- Ernst Achenbach (1909–1991), politician (FDP)
- Herbert Schäfer (1927–1991), football player and coach
- Walter Schneider (1927–2010), motorcycle racing driver
- Bernd Becher (1931–2007), conceptual artist and photographer
- Heinfried Birlenbach (1940–2020), shot putter
- Joachim Frank (born 1940), German-American biophysicist and a Nobel laureate
- Rolf Stommelen (1943–1983), Formula One racer
- Josef Clemens (born 1947), bishop
- Klaus Scheer (born 1950), football player and coach
- Christoph Bode (born 1952), literary scholar
- Reinhard Goebel (born 1952), conductor and violinist
- Stefan Gossler (1955-2026), actor
- Annegret Kober (born 1957), swimmer
- Bernward Koch (born 1957), musician
- Burkhard Jung (born 1958), Lord Mayor of Leipzig
- Dieter Falk (born 1959), music producer, keyboardist and composer
- Peter Autschbach (born 1961), guitarist
- Frank Heinrich (born 1964), theologian and politician (MdB)
- Navid Kermani (born 1967), orientalist and Islamic studies scholar
- Petra Lobinger (born 1967), athlete
- Peter Stein (born 1968), politician (CDU)
- Monika Meyer (born 1972), footballer
- Sabrina Mockenhaupt (born 1980), long distance runner
- August Wittgenstein (born 1981), prince and actor
- Florian Kringe (born 1982), footballer
- Moritz Volz (born 1983), footballer
- Christian Nüchtern (born 1992), ice dancer
- Andromache (born 1995), Greek singer, Cypriot representative in the Eurovision Song Contest 2022

=== Honorary citizens ===
Siegen has conferred honorary citizenship upon the following persons:

- 1887: Heinrich von Achenbach, High President of the Province of Brandenburg
- 1891: Otto von Bismarck, Reich chancellor
- 1933: Adolf Hitler, Reich chancellor*
- 1933: Paul von Hindenburg, General Field Marshal and Reich President

For all those listed up to here, honorary citizenship, according to Enactment no. 21 to the amended German Municipal System of 1 April 1946, has been forfeited. *According to the city council of Siegen Adolf Hitler's honorary citizenship was lapsed by British military law. Caused by political discussion the city council denied Hitler's honorary citizenship posthumously on 29 August 2007.

- 1953: Alfred Fißmer, retired Oberbürgermeister

Honorary citizens of the former town of Hüttental:

- Josef Höfer, Prelate
- Karl Barich, chairman of the board of Stahlwerke Südwestfalen (South Westphalia Steelworks)

== Gallery ==
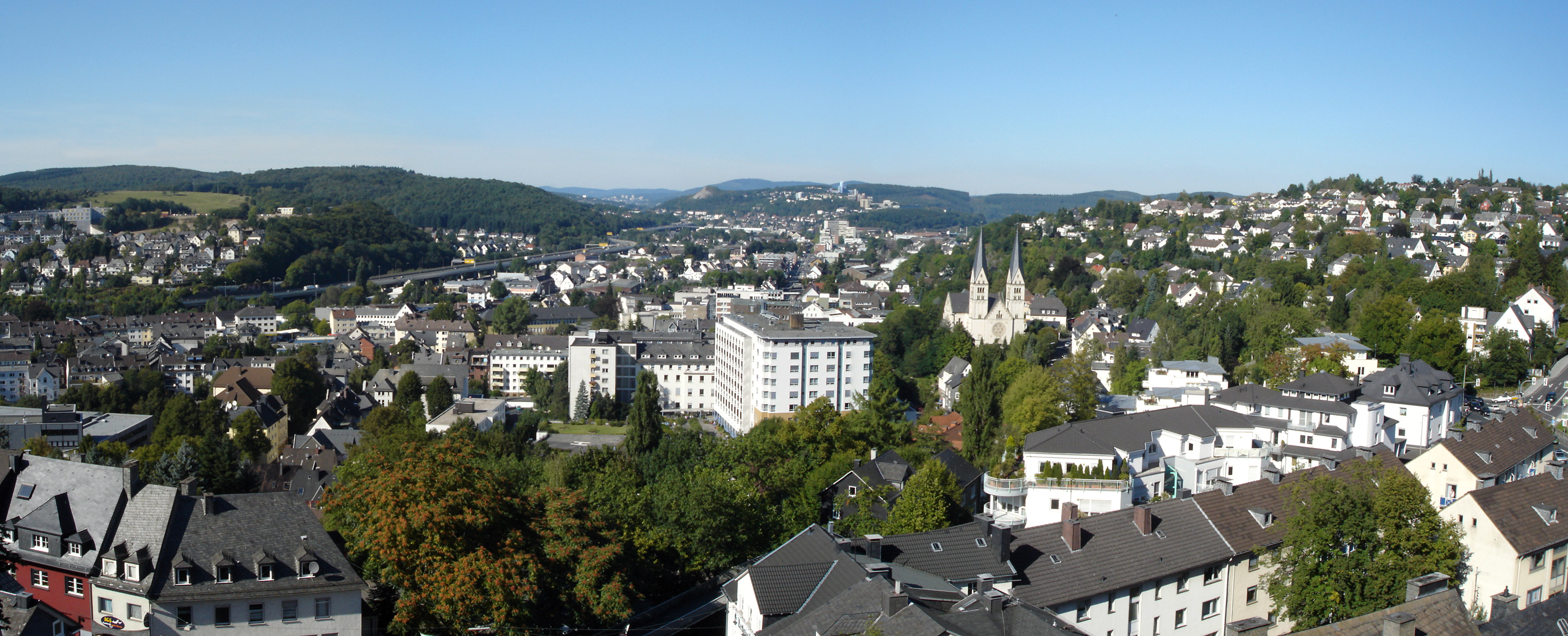
A view over Siegen with the university in the background
