= Beaver, Marinette County, Wisconsin =

Beaver, Wisconsin
- Town
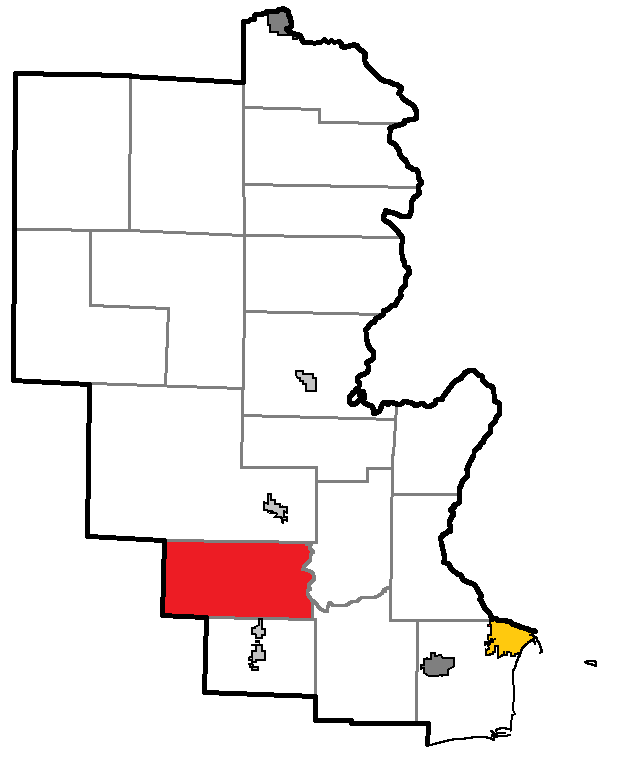
- Location of Beaver, within Marinette County
- Coordinates: 45°9′9″N 88°4′36″W
- Country: United States
- State: Wisconsin
- County: Marinette

Area
  - Total: 69.5 sq mi (180.0 km^{2})
  - Land: 68.6 sq mi (177.7 km^{2})
  - Water: 0.89 sq mi (2.3 km^{2})
- Elevation: 735 ft (224 m)

Population (2020)
  - Total: 1,153
  - Density: 16.81/sq mi (6.488/km^{2})
- Time zone: UTC-6 (Central (CST))
  - Summer (DST): UTC-5 (CDT)
- FIPS code: 55-05800
- GNIS feature ID: 1582774
- Website: https://www.townofbeaver.org/

Beaver is a town in Marinette County, Wisconsin, United States. The population was 1,153 at the 2020 census. The unincorporated community of Beaver is located in the town.

== Geography ==
According to the United States Census Bureau, the town has a total area of 69.5 square miles (180.0 km^{2}), of which 68.6 square miles (177.7 km^{2}) is land and 0.9 square mile (2.3 km^{2}) (1.28%) is water.

== Demographics ==
As of the census of 2000, there were 1,123 people, 444 households, and 314 families residing in the town. The population density was 16.4 inhabitants per square mile (6.3/km^{2}). There were 542 housing units at an average density of 7.9 per square mile (3.1/km^{2}). The racial makeup of the town was 98.84% White, 0.27% African American, 0.18% Native American, 0.36% Asian, 0.27% from other races, and 0.09% from two or more races. Hispanic or Latino of any race were 0.62% of the population.

There were 444 households, out of which 28.6% had children under the age of 18 living with them, 60.6% were married couples living together, 7.0% had a female householder with no husband present, and 29.1% were non-families. 23.9% of all households were made up of individuals, and 11.9% had someone living alone who was 65 years of age or older. The average household size was 2.53 and the average family size was 2.99.

In the town, the population was spread out, with 24.0% under the age of 18, 4.8% from 18 to 24, 27.1% from 25 to 44, 26.9% from 45 to 64, and 17.2% who were 65 years of age or older. The median age was 41 years. For every 100 females, there were 107.6 males. For every 100 females age 18 and over, there were 104.1 males.

The median income for a household in the town was $35,188, and the median income for a family was $37,656. Males had a median income of $30,357 versus $22,647 for females. The per capita income for the town was $15,465. About 8.0% of families and 10.7% of the population were below the poverty line, including 10.4% of those under age 18 and 7.8% of those age 65 or over.
