= Beaver (community), Marinette County, Wisconsin =

Beaver, Wisconsin
- Unincorporated community
- Location within Wisconsin Location within the United States
- Coordinates: 45°08′15″N 88°01′04″W
- Country: United States
- State: Wisconsin
- County: Marinette
- Elevation: 669 ft (204 m)
- Time zone: UTC-6 (Central (CST))
  - Summer (DST): UTC-5 (CDT)
- Area codes: 715 & 534
- GNIS feature ID: 1561419

Beaver is an unincorporated community located in the town of Beaver, Marinette County, Wisconsin, United States. Beaver is located along U.S. Route 141 3 miles (4.8 km) north-northeast of Pound.

== Geography ==
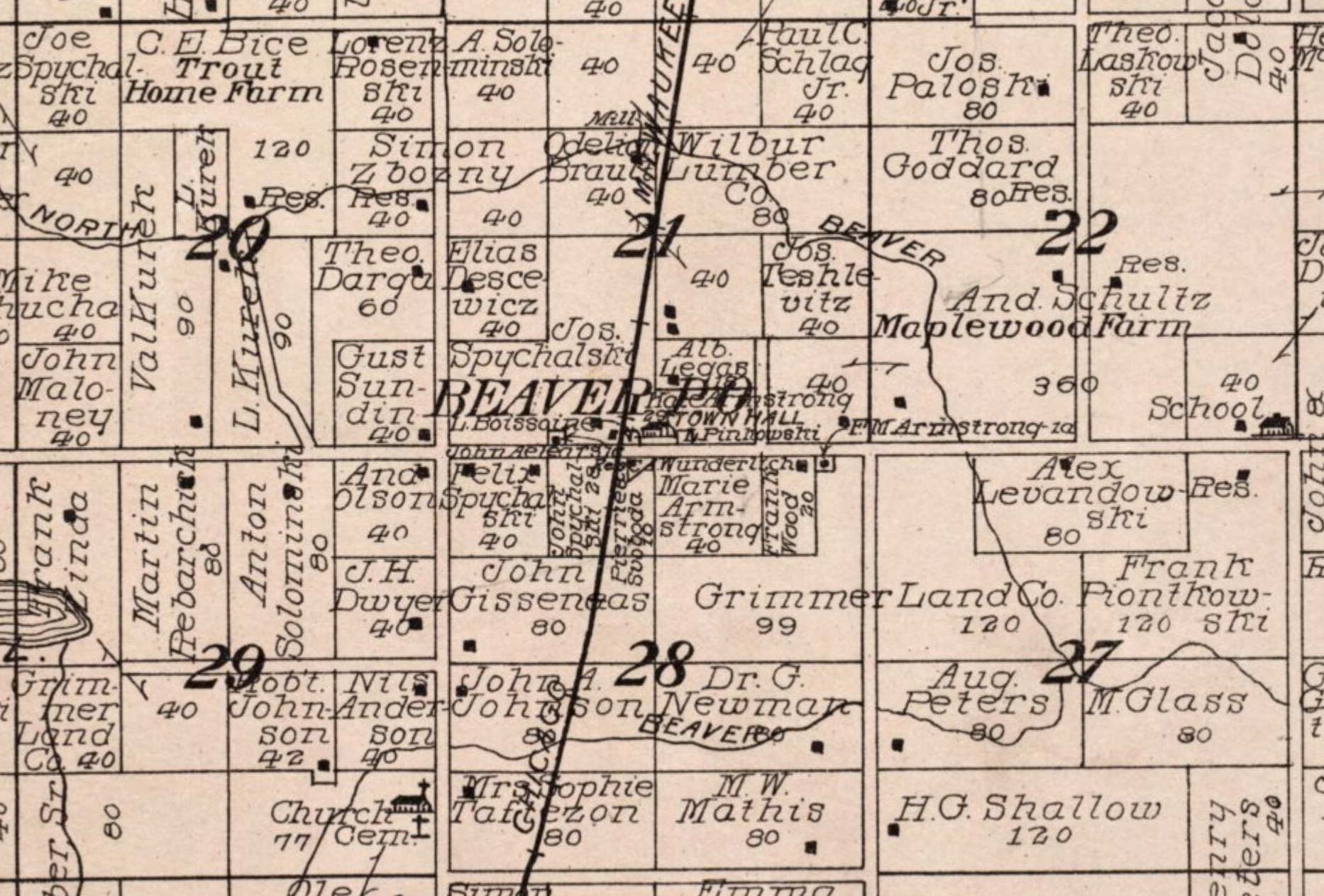
Beaver, 1912 map detail

Beaver is located at the intersection of U.S. Highway 141 and County Highway P, at an elevation of 669 feet (204 m). It is located along the Escanaba and Lake Superior Railroad. It is connected by road to Pound to the south and Crivitz to the north. North Branch Beaver Creek flows north of Beaver, and South Branch Beaver Creek flows south of it. The two creeks join east of Beaver to form Beaver Creek, a tributary of the Peshtigo River.

== Etymology ==
Beaver was originally named Armstrong Dam in honor of Ferdinand Amesley "Pinochle" Armstrong (1834–1913), who settled there in the 1870s. Armstrong built a sawmill there and had a large residence on a 1,500-acre (610 ha) estate. The community was renamed Beaver after Beaver Creek circa 1884, when the post office was established.
