= Charles H. Daub =

American politician (1855–1917)

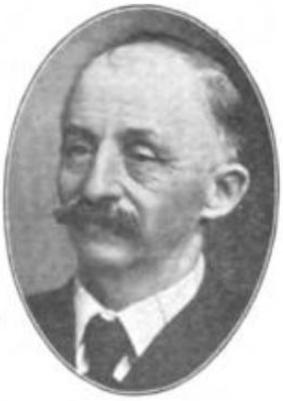

Member of the Wisconsin State Assembly
- In office 1908–1910
- Constituency: Eau Claire County Second District

Personal details
- Born: Charles Henry Daub; September 12, 1855 Siegen, Prussia
- Died: April 3, 1917 (aged 61)
- Party: Republican
- Spouse: Emily Chase
- Children: 4
- Occupation: Farmer, politician

Charles Henry Daub (September 12, 1855 – April 3, 1917) was a member of the Wisconsin State Assembly.

== Biography ==
Daub was born on September 12, 1855, in Siegen, then in Prussia. He moved to Lewiston, Minnesota to live with his parents in 1868. He moved to Eau Claire, Wisconsin in 1869 where he made a living as, among other things, a strawberry farmer. He married Emily Chase and they had four children. He died on April 3, 1917.

== Assembly career ==
Daub defeated Elmer E. Tobey in the 1908 election to serve as a member of the Assembly during the 1909 session. He was a Republican.
