= Principality of Nassau-Diez =

European polity

Principality of Nassau-Diez Fürstentum Nassau-Diez
- 1606–1702
- Coat of arms
- Capital: Diez
- Government
  - Type: County, later Principality
- Count of Nassau-Dietz
  - 1606–1632: Ernest Casimir I
  - 1696–1702: John William
- History
  - County formed: 1606
  - County merged: 1702
Preceded by	Succeeded by
County of Nassau-Dillenburg	Principality of Orange-Nassau
- Today part of: Germany

The Principality of Nassau-Diez (Fürstentum Nassau-Diez) was a former county, later principality of the Holy Roman Empire part of the Lower Rhenish–Westphalian Circle of the empire towards the end of its history. The county was created in 1606 when the former Count of Nassau-Dillenburg's sons divided their father's lands, creating new smaller counties. In 1702, after the Glorious Revolution saw Prince William of Orange become King of England, the county was merged with others to form the new, larger, Principality of Orange-Nassau.

== History ==
Nassau-Diez was created in 1386 when the former County of Diez was dissolved and taken over by the House of Nassau, though it was ruled by the Counts of Nassau-Dillenburg until 1606 when it became independent. After the creation of the county in 1606, the separate line of Nassau-Dietz was formed through inheritance. This line included not just the counts, but also served as Stadtholder of Friesland, Groningen, and Drenthe through the senior House of Orange-Nassau. When the senior line of the branch died out in 1702, the older House of Orange-Nassau inherited the lands of Nassau-Diez.

=== Nassau-Dillenburg ===
In 1386, the last Count of Diez, Gerhard VII died, the county fell to his son-in-law, Count Adolf von Nassau-Dillenburg via his daughter Jutta. From this point, the county was now controlled by a member of the House of Nassau, creating the County of Nassau-Dillenburg. In 1530, the Counts of Nassau-Dillenburg acquired the remainder of the county and in 1564 took complete possession of Dietz Castle. This led to a renaming of the county, becoming the County of Nassau-Dietz.

=== Nassau-Dietz ===
From 1516 to 1559, William the Rich was the reigning Count of Nassau-Dillenberg, Siegen, Vianden, and Dietz. His eldest son Wilhelm "den Schweiger", who was originally a Lutheran, raised as a Roman Catholic from the age of 11, had inherited the county. When the Holy Roman Emperor Charles V away the new Principality of Orange to his cousin René of Chalon, who inherited the county the principality in 1530, William the Silent became Prince of Orange. It was then when William founded the senior House of Orange-Nassau which continues to rule the Netherlands. Upon the death of Johann VI in 1606, who had inherited Nassau-Dillenburg from his father William the Rich, his sons divided the counties between themselves, including his fifth son Ernest Casimir, who also served as Governor (Stadtholder) of Friesland, Groningen, and Drenthe. In 1631, Casimir also inherited the County of Spiegelberg an der Weser.

In 1655, Nassau-Dietz was raised to the status of a principality, becoming the Principality of Nassau-Dietz. From this point, the lord of the area became the 'Prince of Nassau-Dietz'.

The counties of Nassau-Dietz and Spiegelberg along with the Frisian governorship were then successively taken over by his sons Heinrich Casimir I and Wilhelm Friedrich. When Prince William of Orange became King of England, Scotland, and Ireland (etc.) in February 1689, he declared Prince John William Friso as titular Prince of Orange. In 1702, Prince John William merged three of his titles into one: Prince of Orange, Prince of Nassau-Dietz, and Stadtholder of Friesland and Groningen into the Prince of Orange-Nassau.

== Rulers ==
The Counts, later Princes of Nassau-Dietz included:

Name	Lifespan	Reign start	Reign end	Notes	Family	Image
Ernest Casimir I	22 December 1573 – 2 June 1632 (aged 58)	8 October 1606	2 June 1632	Stadtholder, son of John VI	Nassau-Dietz	
Henry Casimir I	21 January 1612 – 13 July 1640 (aged 28)	2 June 1631	13 July 1640	Stadtholder, son of Ernest Casimir I	Nassau-Dietz	
William Frederick	7 August 1613 – 31 October 1664 (aged 51)	31 October 1664	13 July 1640	Stadtholder, son of Ernest Casimir I	Nassau-Dietz	
Henry Casimir II	18 January 1657 – 25 March 1696 (aged 39)	18 January 1664	25 March 1696	Hereditary Stadtholder, son of William Frederick	Nassau-Dietz	
John William Friso	4 August 1687 – 14 July 1711 (aged 23)	25 March 1696	19 March 1702	Hereditary Stadtholder, son of Henry Casimir II, succeeded by his son William IV of Orange-Nassau, Hereditary Stadtholder of the United Netherlands (-> Stadtholderate under the House of Orange-Nassau)	Nassau-Dietz, Orange-Nassau	
