= USS Constitution =

1797 heavy frigate of the U.S. Navy

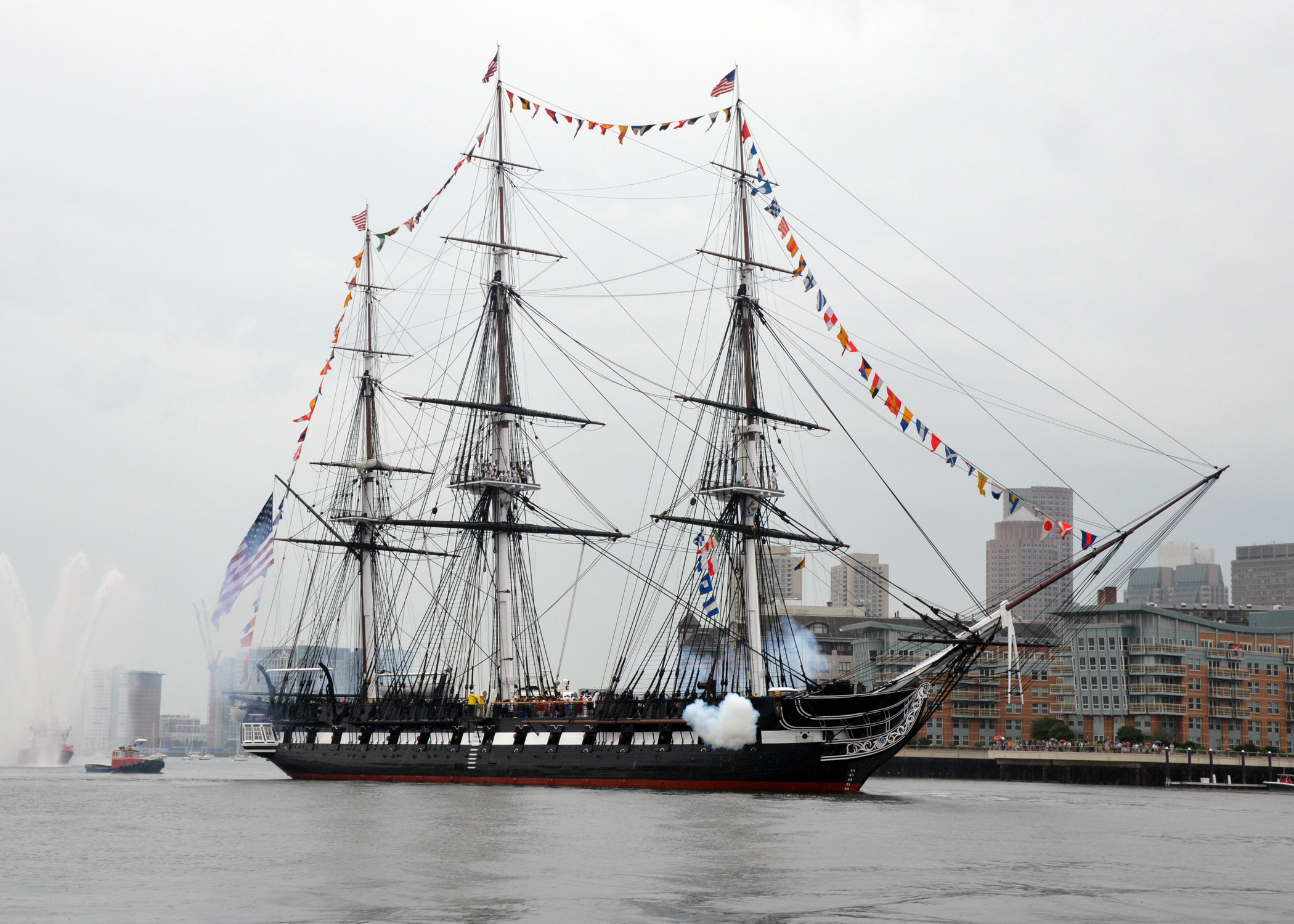
- Constitution, dressed overall, fires a 17-gun salute in Boston Harbor, 4 July 2014.

History

United States
- Name: USS Constitution
- Namesake: Constitution of the United States
- Operator: US Navy
- Ordered: 1 March 1794
- Builder: Edmund Hartt's shipyard
- Cost: $302,718
- Laid down: 1 November 1794
- Launched: 21 October 1797; 229 years ago
- Maiden voyage: 22 July 1798
- Renamed: Old Constitution 1917; Constitution 1925
- Reclassified: IX-21, 1941; No classification, 1 September 1975
- Home port: Charlestown Navy Yard
- Identification: Code letters: NAPJ
- Nickname(s): Old Ironsides
- Status: in active service
- Notes: First commander: Captain Samuel Nicholson
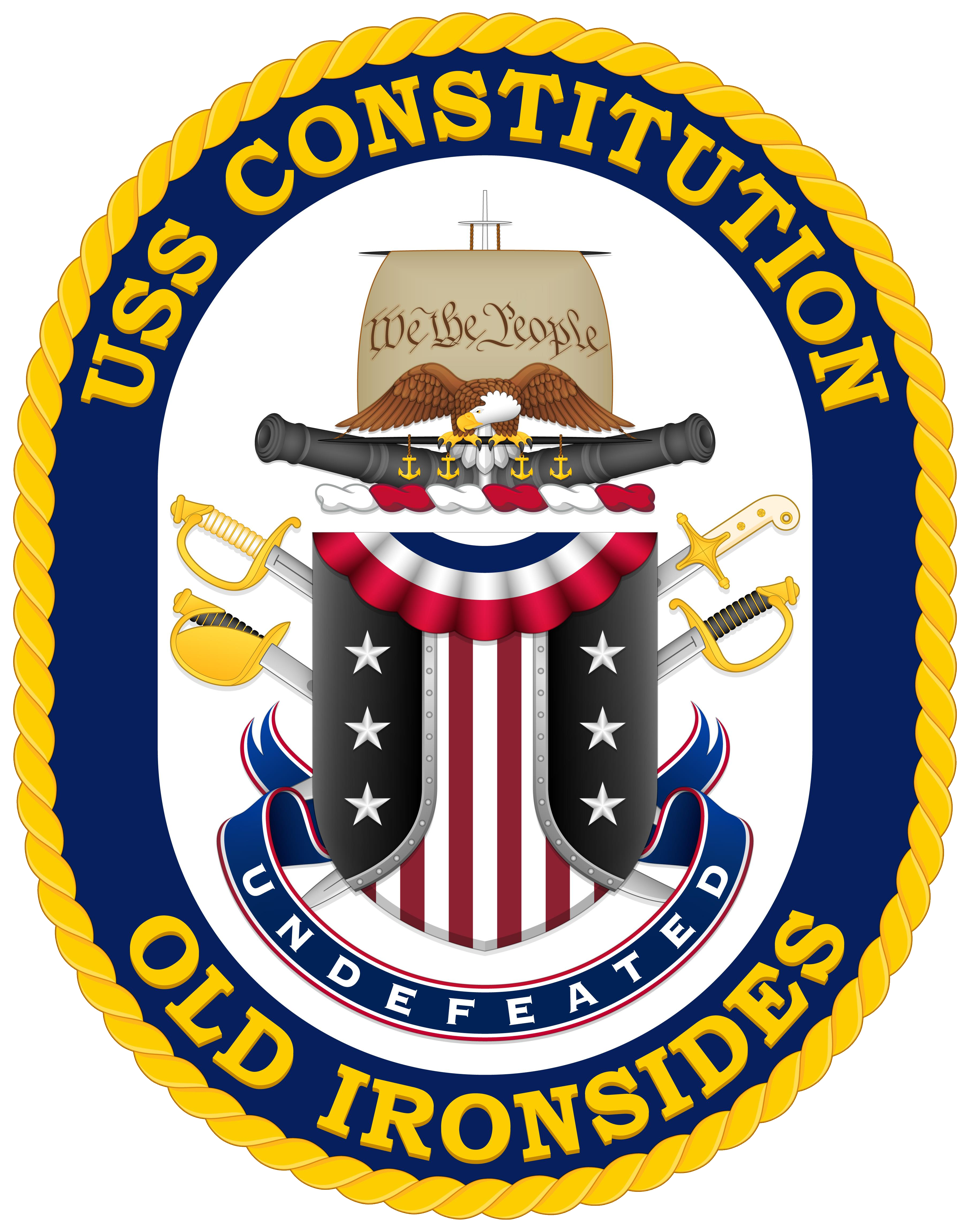
- Badge

General characteristics (as built c. 1797)
- Type: 44-gun United States-class frigate
- Tonnage: 1,576
- Displacement: 2,200 tons
- Length: 304 ft (93 m) bowsprit to spanker or 175 ft (53 m) between perpendiculars, 145 ft (44 m) at the keel; 207 ft (63 m) billet head to taffrail; 175 ft (53 m) at waterline
- Beam: 43 ft 6 in (13.26 m)
- Height: foremast: 198 ft (60 m); mainmast: 220 ft (67 m); mizzenmast: 172.5 ft (52.6 m)
- Draft: 21 ft (6.4 m) forward; 23 ft (7.0 m) aft
- Depth of hold: 14 ft 3 in (4.34 m)
- Decks: Orlop, Berth, Gun, Spar
- Propulsion: Sail (three masts, ship rig)
- Sail plan: 42,710 sq ft (3,968 m^{2}) on three masts
- Speed: 13 knots (24 km/h; 15 mph)
- Boats & landing craft carried: 1 × 36 ft (11 m) longboat; 2 × 30 ft (9.1 m) cutters; 2 × 28 ft (8.5 m) whaleboats; 1 × 28 ft (8.5 m) gig; 1 × 22 ft (6.7 m) jolly boat; 1 × 14 ft (4.3 m) punt
- Complement: 450, including 55 Marines and 30 boys (1797)
- Crew: 75 officers and crew
- Armament: 30 × 24-pounder (11 kg) long gun; 22 × 32-pounder (15 kg) carronade; 2 × 24-pounder (11 kg) bow chasers
- USS Constitution (frigate)
- U.S. National Register of Historic Places
- U.S. National Historic Landmark
- U.S. Historic district – Contributing property
- Location within Boston Location within Massachusetts
- Location: Charlestown Navy Yard
- Coordinates: 42°22′21″N 71°03′24″W
- Part of: Boston National Historical Park (ID74002222)
- NRHP reference No.: 66000789

Significant dates
- Added to NRHP: 15 October 1966
- Designated NHL: 19 December 1960
- Designated CP: 26 October 1974

USS Constitution, also known as Old Ironsides, is a three-masted wooden-hulled heavy frigate of the United States Navy. She is the second oldest naval vessel still in commission, and the oldest still afloat. (Note: HMS Victory is three decades older, but she has been in dry dock since 1922.) She was launched in 1797, one of six original frigates authorized for construction by the Naval Act of 1794 and the third constructed. The name "Constitution" was among ten names submitted to President George Washington by Secretary of War Timothy Pickering in March or May for the frigates that were to be constructed. Joshua Humphreys designed the frigates to be the young Navy's capital ships, and so Constitution and her sister ships were larger and more heavily armed and built than standard frigates of the period. She was built at Edmund Hartt's shipyard in the North End of Boston, Massachusetts. Her first duties were to provide protection for American merchant shipping during the Quasi-War with France and to defeat the Barbary pirates in the First Barbary War.

Constitution is most noted for her actions during the War of 1812 with the United Kingdom, when she captured numerous British merchantmen and five warships: HMS Guerriere, Java, Pictou, Cyane, and Levant. The capture of Guerriere earned her the nickname "Old Ironsides", adding on the public adoration that had repeatedly saved her from scrapping. She continued to serve as flagship in the Mediterranean and African squadrons, and she circled the world in the 1840s. During the American Civil War, she served as a training ship for the United States Naval Academy. She carried American artwork and industrial displays to the Paris Exposition of 1878.

Constitution was retired from active service in 1881 and served as a receiving ship until being designated a museum ship in 1907. In 1934, she completed a three-year, 90-port tour of the nation. She sailed under her own power for her 200th birthday in 1997, and again in August 2012 to commemorate the 200th anniversary of her victory over Guerriere.

Constitution's stated mission today is to promote understanding of the Navy's role in war and peace through educational outreach, historical demonstration, and active participation in public events as part of the Naval History and Heritage Command. As she is a fully commissioned Navy ship, her crew of 75 officers and sailors participate in ceremonies, educational programs, and special events while keeping her open to visitors year round and providing free tours. The officers and crew are all active-duty Navy personnel, and the assignment is considered to be special duty. She is usually berthed at Pier 1 of the former Charlestown Navy Yard at one end of Boston's Freedom Trail.

== Construction ==
In 1785, Barbary pirates, most notably from Algiers, began to seize American merchant vessels in the Mediterranean Sea. In 1793 alone, 11 American ships were captured and their crews and stores held for ransom. To combat this problem, proposals were made for warships to protect American shipping, resulting in the Naval Act of 1794. The act provided funds to construct six frigates, but it included a clause that the construction of the ships would be halted if peace terms were agreed to with Algiers.

Joshua Humphreys' design was unusual for the time, being deep, long on keel, narrow of beam (width), and mounting very heavy guns. The design called for diagonal riders intended to restrict hogging and sagging while giving the ships extremely heavy planking. This design gave the hull a greater strength than a more lightly built frigate. It was based on Humphrey's realization that the fledgling United States could not match the European states in the size of their navies, so they were designed to overpower any other frigate while escaping from a ship of the line.

Her keel was laid down on 1 November 1794 at Edmund Hartt's shipyard in Boston, Massachusetts, under the supervision of Captain Samuel Nicholson, master shipwright Colonel George Claghorn and Foreman Prince Athearn of the Martha's Vineyard Athearns. Constitution's hull was built 21 inches (530 mm) thick and her length between perpendiculars was 175 ft (53 m), with a 204 ft (62 m) length overall and a width of 43 ft 6 in (13.26 m). In total, 60 acres (24 ha) of trees were needed for her construction. Primary materials consisted of pine and oak, including southern live oak which was cut from Gascoigne Bluff and milled near St. Simons Island, Georgia. Enslaved workers were used to harvest the oak used for the ship's construction, and USS Constitution Museum historian Carl Herzog stated that "the forced labor of enslaved people was an expediency that Navy officials and contractors saw as fundamental to the job... enslaved people were essential to the construction of naval warships built to secure the very American freedoms they were denied."

A peace accord was announced between the United States and Algiers in March 1796, and her construction was halted in accordance with the Naval Act of 1794. After some debate and prompting by President Washington, Congress agreed to continue funding the construction of the three ships nearest to completion: United States, Constellation, and Constitution. Constitution's launching ceremony on 20 September 1797 was attended by President John Adams and Massachusetts Governor Increase Sumner. Upon launch, she slid down the ways only 27 feet (8.2 m) before stopping; her weight had caused the ways to settle into the ground, preventing further movement. An attempt two days later resulted in only 31 feet (9.4 m) of additional travel before the ship again stopped. After a month of rebuilding the ways, Constitution finally slipped into Boston Harbor on 21 October 1797, with Captain James Sever breaking a bottle of Madeira wine on her bowsprit.

=== Armament ===
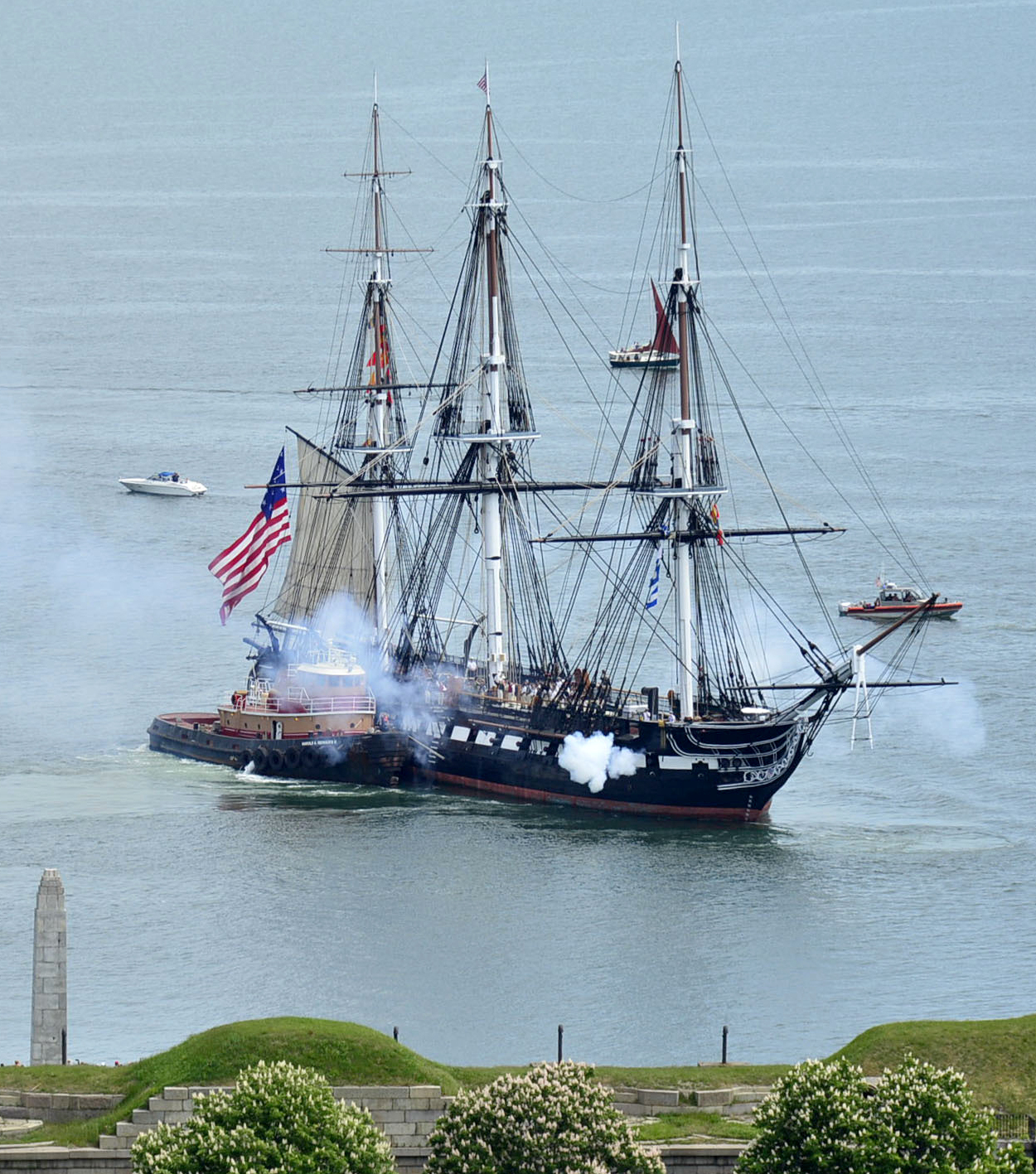
Constitution fires her cannons as she is towed through Boston Harbor in 2021.

Constitution was rated as a 44-gun frigate, but she often carried more than 50 guns at a time. Ships of this era had no permanent battery of guns such as those of modern Navy ships. The guns and cannons were designed to be completely portable and often were exchanged between ships as situations warranted. Each commanding officer outfitted armaments to his liking, taking into consideration factors such as the overall weight of stores, complement of personnel aboard, and planned routes to be sailed. Consequently, the armaments on ships changed often during their careers, and records of the changes were not generally kept.

In a letter dated 14 November 1804, she is listed as having thirty 24-pounders, fourteen 12-pounders, and eight 32-pounder carronades, a total of 52 guns.

During the War of 1812, Constitution's battery of guns typically consisted of 30 long 24-pounder (11 kg) cannons, with 15 on each side of the gun deck. Twenty-two more guns were deployed on the spar deck, 11 per side, each a short 32-pounder (15 kg) carronade. Four chase guns were also positioned, two each at the stern and bow.

All of the guns aboard Constitution have been replicas since her 1927–1931 restoration. Most were cast in 1930, but two carronades on the spar deck were cast in 1983. A modern 40 mm (1.6 in) saluting gun was hidden inside the forward long gun on each side during her 1973–1976 restoration in order to restore the capability of firing ceremonial salutes.

== Quasi-War ==
President John Adams ordered all Navy ships to sea in late May 1798 to patrol for armed French ships and to free any American ship captured by them. Constitution was still not ready to sail and eventually had to borrow sixteen 18-pound (8.2 kg) cannons from Castle Island before finally being ready. She put to sea on the evening of 22 July 1798 with orders to patrol the Eastern seaboard between New Hampshire and New York. She was patrolling between Chesapeake Bay and Savannah, Georgia, a month later when Nicholson found his first opportunity for capturing a prize. They intercepted Niger off the coast of Charleston, South Carolina, on 8 September, a 24-gun ship sailing with a French crew en route from Jamaica to Philadelphia which claimed to have been under British orders. Nicholson had the crewmen imprisoned, perhaps not understanding his orders correctly. He placed a prize crew aboard Niger and brought her into Norfolk, Virginia.

Constitution sailed south again a week later to escort a merchant convoy, but her bowsprit was severely damaged in a gale and she returned to Boston for repairs. In the meantime, Secretary of the Navy Benjamin Stoddert determined that Niger had been operating under British orders as claimed, and the ship and her crew were released to continue their voyage. The American government paid a restitution of $11,000 (equivalent to $212,907 in 2025) to Britain.

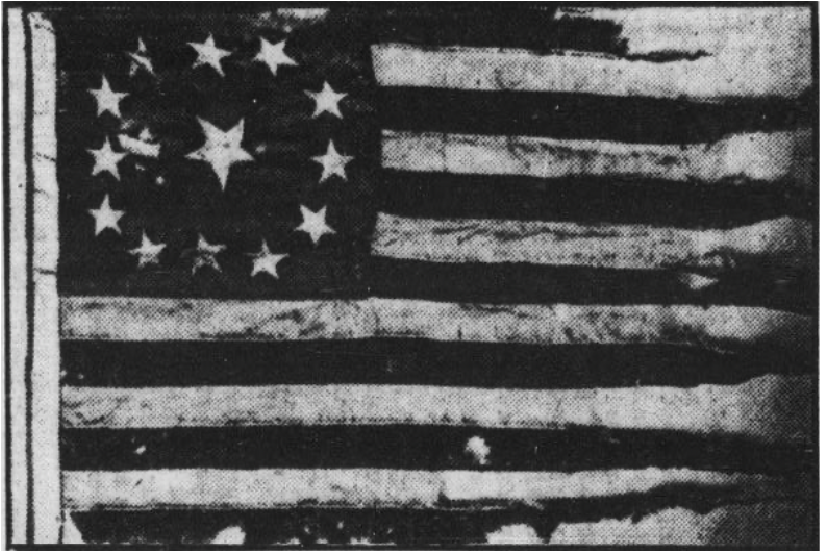
Ship's original flag

Constitution departed Boston on 29 December. Nicholson reported to Commodore John Barry, who was flying his flag in United States near the island of Dominica for patrols in the West Indies. On 15 January 1799, Constitution intercepted the English merchantman Spencer, which had been taken prize by the French frigate L'Insurgente a few days prior. Technically, Spencer was a French ship operated by a French prize crew; but Nicholson released the ship and her crew the next morning, perhaps hesitant after the affair with Niger. Upon joining Barry's command, Constitution almost immediately had to put in for repairs to her rigging due to storm damage, and it was not until 1 March that anything of note occurred. On this date, she encountered HMS Santa Margarita, whose captain was an acquaintance of Nicholson's. The two agreed to a sailing duel, which the English captain was confident he would win. But after 11 hours of sailing, Santa Margarita lowered her sails and admitted defeat, paying off the bet with a cask of wine to Nicholson. Resuming her patrols, Constitution managed to recapture the American sloop Neutrality on 27 March. On 4 April 1799 she recaptured His Majesty's Packet Carteret that had been captured by the French on 29 March. Secretary Stoddert had other plans, however, and recalled Constitution to Boston. She arrived there on 14 May, and Nicholson was relieved of command.

=== Change of command ===
Captain Silas Talbot was recalled to duty to command Constitution and serve as Commodore of operations in the West Indies. After repairs and resupply were completed, Constitution departed Boston on 23 July with a destination of Saint-Domingue via Norfolk and a mission to interrupt French shipping. She departed Norfolk on 14 August. She recaptured the Hamberg ship Amelia from a French prize crew on 15 September, and Talbot sent the ship back to New York City with an American prize crew. The ship was sold but the Court ordered the money returned to her owners. Constitution arrived at Saint-Domingue on 15 October and rendezvoused with Boston, General Greene, and Norfolk. No further incidents occurred over the next six months, as French depredations in the area had declined. Constitution busied herself with routine patrols, and Talbot made diplomatic visits. On 2 February 1800 put men aboard an unidentified American schooner and had her sent to New York for possible illegal trading. It was not until April 1800 that Talbot investigated an increase in ship traffic near Puerto Plata, Santo Domingo, and discovered that the French privateer Sandwich had taken refuge there. On 8 May the squadron captured the sloop Sally, and Talbot hatched a plan to capture Sandwich by utilizing the familiarity of Sally to allow the Americans access to the harbor. On 9 May her Tender "Amphitheatre" engaged a French privateer schooner that, after a short action, was run aground and abandoned by her crew. The privateer was captured and refloated and her two prizes, brig "Nymph" and schooner "Esther", were recaptured. First Lieutenant Isaac Hull led 90 sailors and Marines into Puerto Plata without challenge on 11 May, capturing Sandwich and spiking the guns of the nearby Spanish fort. However, it was later determined that Sandwich had been captured from a neutral port; she was returned to the French with apologies, and no prize money was awarded to the squadron.

Routine patrols again occupied Constitution for the next two months, until 13 July, when the mainmast trouble of a few months before recurred. The ship put into Cape François for repairs. While leaving the roads of Cape Francois on 22 July she struck a reef and was pulled off 45 minutes later. With the terms of enlistment soon to expire for the sailors aboard her, she made preparations to return to the United States and was relieved of duty by Constellation on 23 July. Constitution escorted 12 merchantmen to Philadelphia on her return voyage, and on 25 August arrived in President Roads, off Boston, and put in quarantine. She received new masts, sails, and rigging. Even though peace was imminent between the United States and France, Constitution again sailed for the West Indies on 17 December as squadron flagship, rendezvousing with Congress, Adams, Augusta, Richmond, and Trumbull. Although no longer allowed to pursue French shipping, the squadron was assigned to protect American shipping and continued in that capacity until April 1801, when Herald arrived with orders for the squadron to return to the United States. Constitution returned to Boston. Captain Talbot resigned his Commission 8 September 1801 and Lt.Isaac Hull was ordered to take command in a letter dated 21 September 1801. She was finally scheduled for an overhaul, Captain Samuel Nicholson was ordered to supervise the work in a letter dated 1 April 1802. It was canceled in a letter dated 18 June with the crew ordered discharged, Capt. Nicholson was relieved by her Sailing Master Nathaniel Harden. She was placed in ordinary on 2 July 1802.

== First Barbary War ==
The United States paid tribute to the Barbary States during the Quasi-War to ensure that American merchant ships were not harassed and seized. In 1801, Yusuf Karamanli of Tripoli was dissatisfied that the United States was paying him less than they paid Algiers, and he demanded an immediate payment of $250,000 (equivalent to $4,837,500 in 2025). In response, Thomas Jefferson sent a squadron of frigates to protect American merchant ships in the Mediterranean and to pursue peace with the Barbary States.

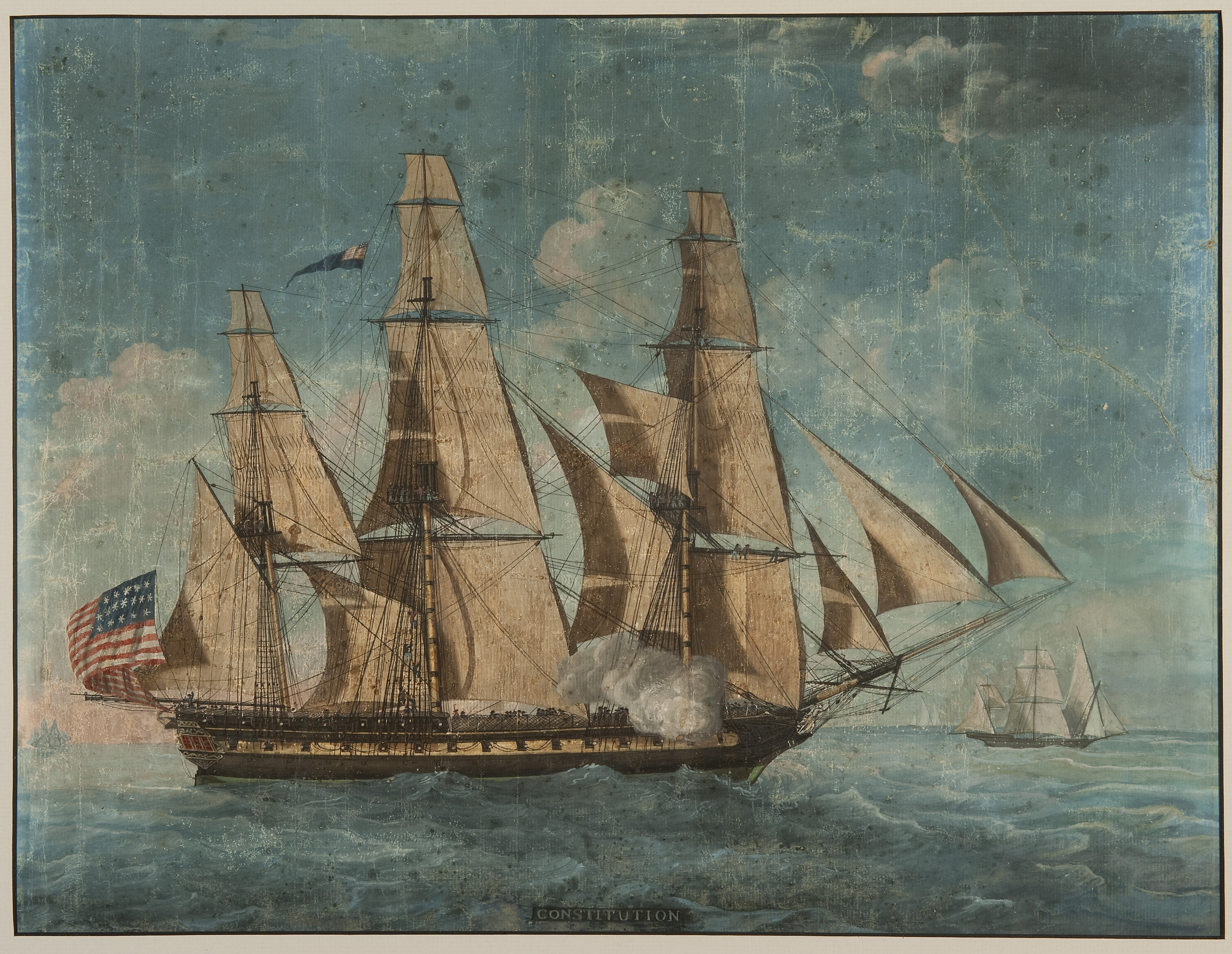
Constitution c. 1803–04

The first squadron under the command of Richard Dale in President was instructed to escort merchant ships through the Mediterranean and to negotiate with leaders of the Barbary States. A second squadron was assembled under the command of Richard Valentine Morris in Chesapeake. The performance of Morris's squadron was so poor, however, that he was recalled and subsequently dismissed from the Navy in 1803.

Captain Edward Preble ordered to take command of Constitution in a letter dated 14 May 1803 as his flagship and made preparations to command a new squadron for a third blockade attempt. She was recommissioned on 20 May. The copper sheathing on her hull needed to be replaced and Paul Revere supplied the copper sheets necessary for the job that took 14 days, ending on 25 June. She departed Boston on 14 August, and she encountered an unknown ship in the darkness on 6 September, near the Rock of Gibraltar. Constitution went to general quarters, then ran alongside the unknown ship. Preble hailed her, only to receive a hail in return. He identified his ship as the United States frigate Constitution but received an evasive answer from the other ship. Preble replied: "I am now going to hail you for the last time. If a proper answer is not returned, I will fire a shot into you." The stranger returned, "If you give me a shot, I'll give you a broadside." Preble demanded that the other ship identify herself and the stranger replied, "This is His Britannic Majesty's ship Donegal, 84 guns, Sir Richard Strachan, an English commodore." He then commanded Preble, "Send your boat on board." Preble was now devoid of all patience and exclaimed, "This is United States ship Constitution, 44 guns, Edward Preble, an American commodore, who will be damned before he sends his boat on board of any vessel." And then to his gun crews: "Blow your matches, boys!" (Note: This was the instruction for the gun crews to blow on their slow matches to make them white hot for igniting a cannon. The modern-day equivalent might be "prepare to fire".) Before the incident escalated further, however, a boat arrived from the other ship and a British lieutenant relayed his captain's apologies. The ship was in fact not Donegal but instead HMS Maidstone, a 32-gun frigate. Constitution had come alongside her so quietly that Maidstone had delayed answering with the proper hail while she readied her guns. This act began the strong allegiance between Preble and the officers under his command, known as "Preble's boys", as he had shown that he was willing to defy a presumed ship of the line.

Constitution arrived at Gibraltar on 12 September, where Preble waited for the other ships of the squadron. His first order of business was to arrange a treaty with Sultan Slimane of Morocco, who was holding American ships hostage to ensure the return of two vessels that the Americans had captured. Constitution and Nautilus departed Gibraltar on 3 October and arrived at Tangier on the 4th. Adams and New York arrived the next day. With four American warships in his harbor, the Sultan was glad to arrange the transfer of ships between the two nations, and Preble departed with his squadron on 14 October, heading back to Gibraltar.

=== Battle of Tripoli Harbor ===
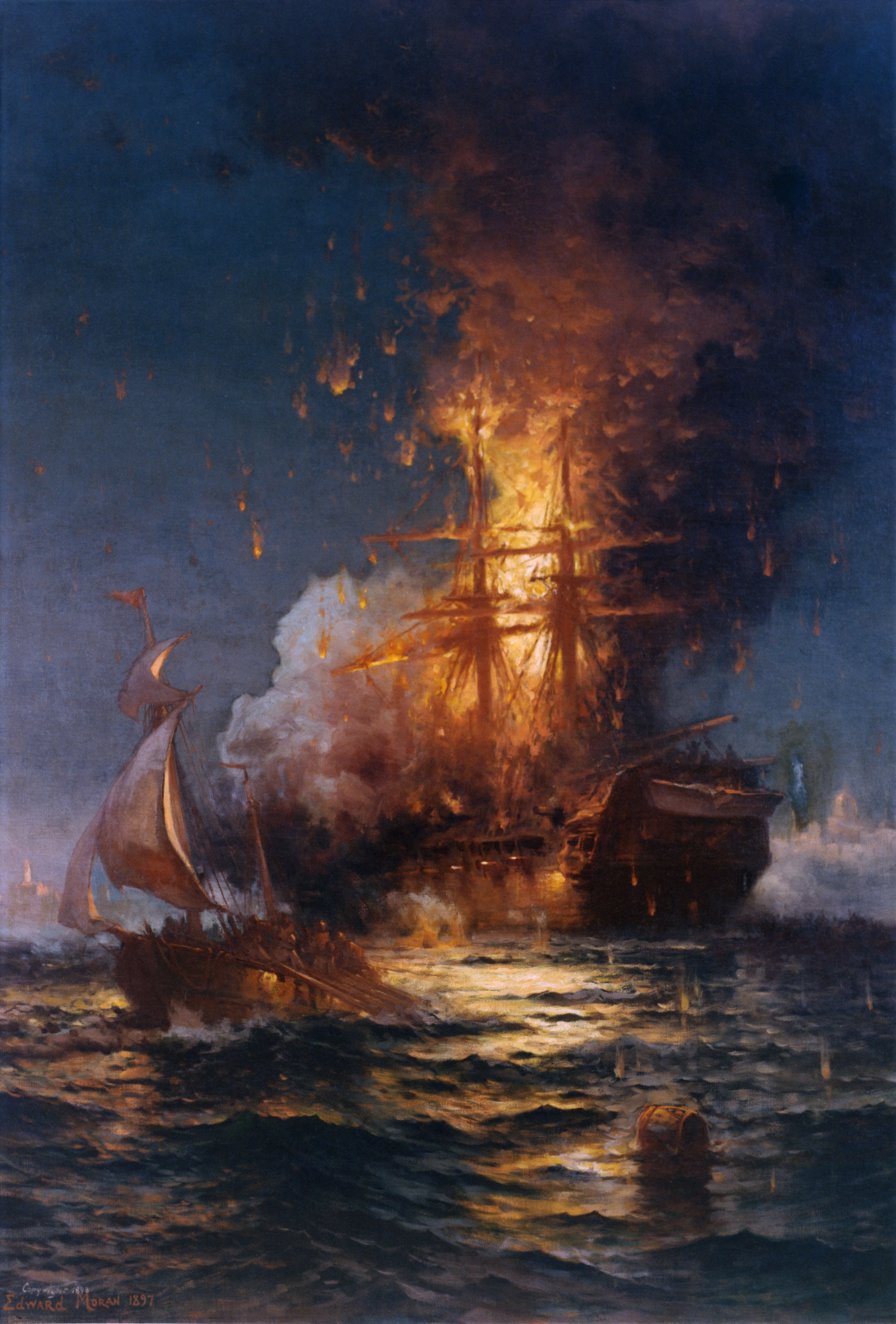
Philadelphia burning in Tripoli Harbor

Philadelphia ran aground off Tripoli on 31 October under the command of William Bainbridge while pursuing a Tripoline vessel. The crew was taken prisoner; Philadelphia was refloated by the Tripolines and brought into their harbor. To deprive the Tripolines of their prize, Preble planned to destroy Philadelphia using the captured ship Mastico, which was renamed Intrepid. Intrepid entered Tripoli Harbor on 16 February 1804 under the command of Stephen Decatur, disguised as a merchant ship. Decatur's crew quickly overpowered the Tripoline crew and set Philadelphia ablaze.

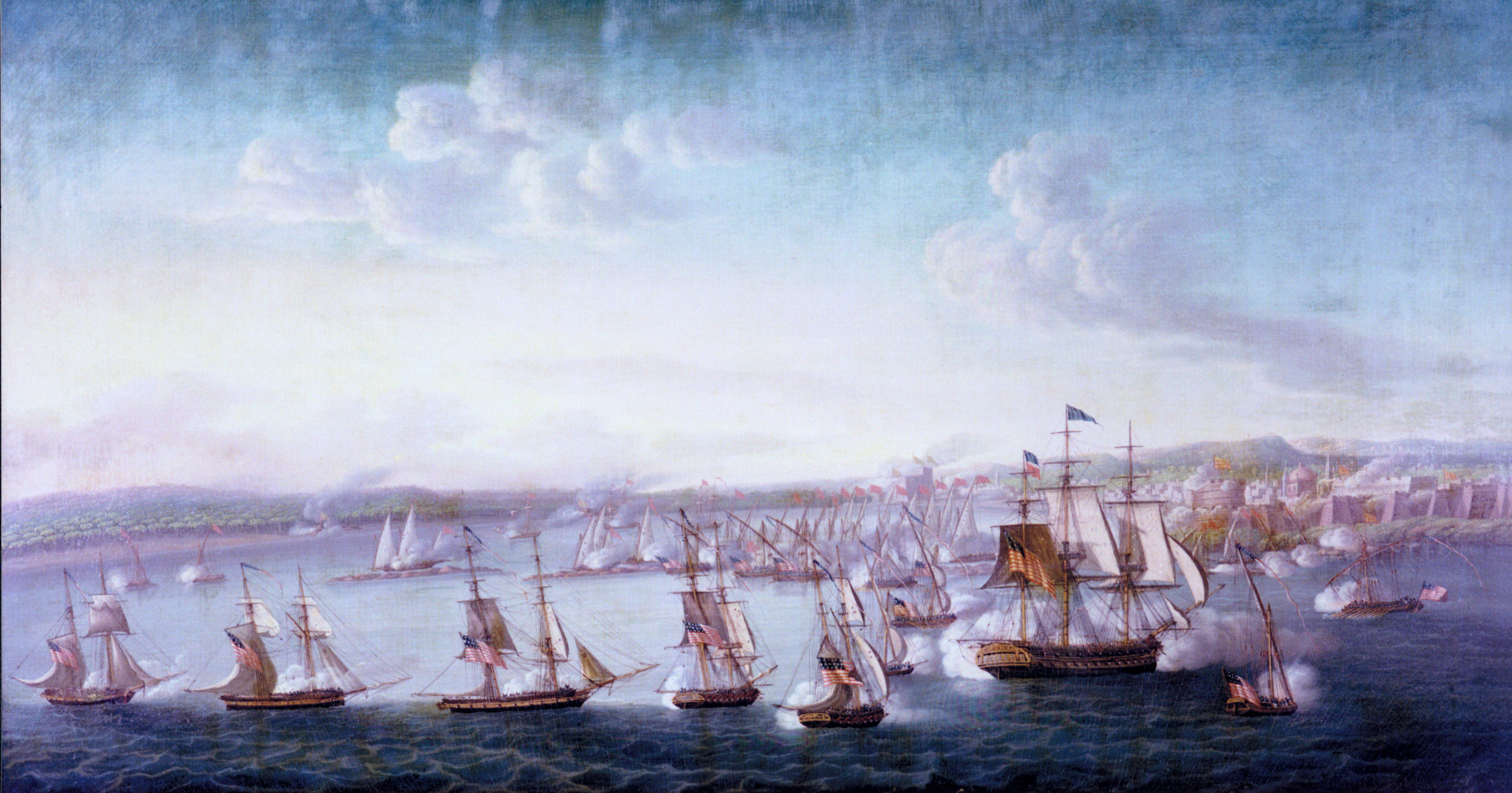
USS Constitution participating in the bombardment of Tripoli, 3 August 1804; painting by Michele Felice Cornè (1752–1845)

Preble withdrew the squadron to Syracuse, Sicily, and began planning for a summer attack on Tripoli. He procured a number of smaller gunboats that could move in closer to Tripoli than was feasible for Constitution, given her deep draft. Constitution, Argus, Enterprise, Scourge, Syren, the six gunboats, and two bomb ketches arrived the morning of 3 August and immediately began operations. Twenty-two Tripoline gunboats met them in the harbor; Constitution and her squadron severely damaged or destroyed the Tripoline gunboats in a series of attacks over the coming month, taking their crews prisoner. Constitution primarily provided gunfire support, bombarding the shore batteries of Tripoli—yet Karamanli remained firm in his demand for ransom and tribute, despite his losses.

Preble outfitted Intrepid as a "floating volcano" with 100 short tons (91 t) of gunpowder aboard in a final attempt of the season. She was to sail into Tripoli harbor and blow up in the midst of the corsair fleet, close under the walls of the city. Intrepid made her way into the harbor on the evening of 3 September under the command of Richard Somers, but she exploded prematurely, killing Somers and his entire crew of thirteen volunteers.

Constellation and President arrived at Tripoli on the 9th with Samuel Barron in command; Preble relinquished his command of the squadron to Barron, who was senior in rank. On 11 September Barron ordered Capt. Stephen Decatur to relieve Preble as Captain so Preble could return to the US. Constitution was ordered to Malta on the 11th for repairs as she was very leaky, and, while en route, on 12 September, captured two Greek vessels attempting to deliver wheat into Tripoli. Also on the 12th, a collision with President severely damaged Constitution's bow, stern, and figurehead of Hercules. The collision was attributed to an act of God in the form of a sudden change in wind direction.

=== Peace treaty ===
On 24 September Captain Stephan Decatur was ordered by Preble to sail to Malta and take command of Constitution. Captain Decatur took command from Capt. Preble at Malta on 28 October and Capt. Preble took up quarters on shore. Captain John Rodgers assumed command of Constitution on 9 November 1804 while she underwent repairs and resupply in Malta. She resumed the blockade of Tripoli on 5 April 1805. On 25 April 1805 she captured a Tripoline privately owned armed xebec, along with two Neapolitan prizes that the xebec had captured. On 10 May 1805 she captured a ketch leaving Tripoli. Meanwhile, Commodore Barron gave William Eaton naval support to bombard Derne, while a detachment of US Marines under the command of Presley O'Bannon was assembled to attack the city by land. They captured it on 27 April. A peace treaty with Tripoli was signed aboard Constitution on 3 June, in which she embarked the crew members of Philadelphia and returned them to Syracuse. She was then dispatched to Tunis and arrived there on 30 July. Seventeen additional American warships had gathered in its harbor by 1 August: Congress, Constellation, Enterprise, Essex, Franklin, Hornet, John Adams, Nautilus, Syren, and eight gunboats. Negotiations went on for several days until a short-term blockade of the harbor finally produced a peace treaty on 14 August.

Rodgers remained in command of the squadron, sending warships back to the United States when they were no longer needed. Eventually, all that remained were Constitution, Enterprise, and Hornet. They performed routine patrols and observed the French and Royal Navy operations of the Napoleonic Wars. Rodgers turned over the command of the squadron and Constitution to Captain Hugh G. Campbell on 29 May 1806.

James Barron sailed Chesapeake out of Norfolk on 15 May 1807 to replace Constitution as the flagship of the Mediterranean squadron, but he encountered HMS Leopard, resulting in the Chesapeake–Leopard affair and delaying the relief of Constitution. Constitution continued patrols, unaware of the delay. She arrived in late June at Leghorn, where she took aboard the disassembled Tripoli Monument for transport back to the United States. Campbell learned the fate of Chesapeake when he arrived at Málaga, and he immediately began preparing Constitution and Hornet for possible war against Britain. The crew became mutinous upon learning of the delay in their relief and refused to sail any farther unless the destination was the United States. Campbell and his officers threatened to fire a cannon loaded with grapeshot at the crewmen if they did not comply, thereby putting an end to the conflict. Campbell and the squadron were ordered home on 18 August and set sail for Boston on 8 September, arriving there on 14 October. Constitution had been gone for more than four years.

== War of 1812 ==
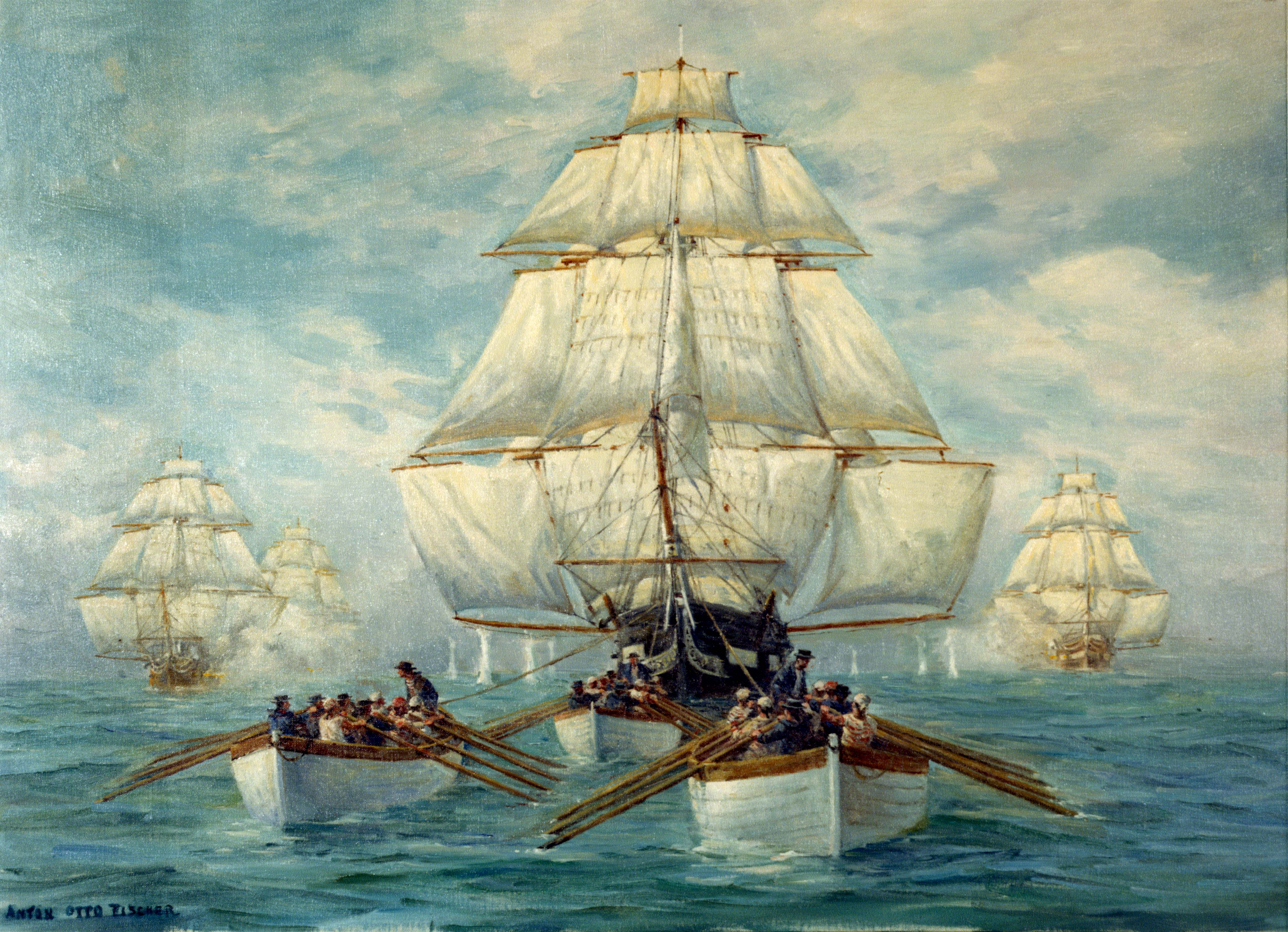
Constitution during the chase

Constitution was recommissioned in December with Captain John Rodgers again taking command to oversee a major refitting. She was overhauled at a cost just under $100,000; however, Rodgers inexplicably failed to clean her copper sheathing, leading him to later declare her a "slow sailer". She spent most of the following two years on training runs and ordinary duty. Isaac Hull took command in June 1810, and he immediately recognized that she needed her bottom cleaned. "Ten waggon loads" of barnacles and seaweed were removed.

Hull departed for France on 5 August 1811, transporting the new Ambassador Joel Barlow and his family; they arrived on 1 September. Hull remained near France and the Netherlands through the winter months, continually holding sail and gun drills to keep the crew ready for possible hostilities with the British. Tensions were high between the United States and Britain after the events of the Little Belt affair the previous May, and Constitution was shadowed by British frigates while awaiting dispatches from Barlow to carry back to the United States. They arrived home on 18 February 1812.

War was declared on 18 June and Hull put to sea on 12 July, attempting to join the five ships of a squadron under the command of Rodgers in President. He sighted five ships off Egg Harbor, New Jersey, on 17 July and at first believed them to be Rodgers' squadron but, by the following morning, the lookouts determined that they were a British squadron out of Halifax: HMS Aeolus, Africa, Belvidera, Guerriere, and Shannon. They had sighted Constitution and were giving chase.

Constitution was becalmed and unable to run from the five British ships, but Hull acted on a suggestion from his First Lieutenant Charles Morris. He ordered the crew to put boats over the side to tow the ship out of range, using kedge anchors to draw the ship forward and wetting the sails to take advantage of every breath of wind. The British ships soon imitated the tactic of kedging and remained in pursuit. The resulting 57-hour chase in the July heat forced the crew of Constitution to employ myriad tactics to outrun the squadron, finally pumping overboard 2,300 US gal (8.7 kl) of drinking water. Cannon fire was exchanged several times, though the British attempts fell short or overshot their mark, including an attempted broadside from Belvidera. On 19 July, Constitution pulled far enough ahead of the British that they abandoned the pursuit.

Constitution arrived in Boston on 27 July and remained there just long enough to replenish her supplies. Hull sailed without orders on 2 August to avoid being blockaded in port, heading on a northeast route towards the British shipping lanes near Halifax and the Gulf of Saint Lawrence. Constitution captured three British merchantmen, which Hull burned rather than risk taking them back to an American port. On 16 August, he learned of a British frigate 100 nmi (190 km; 120 mi) to the south and sailed in pursuit.

=== Constitution vs. Guerriere ===
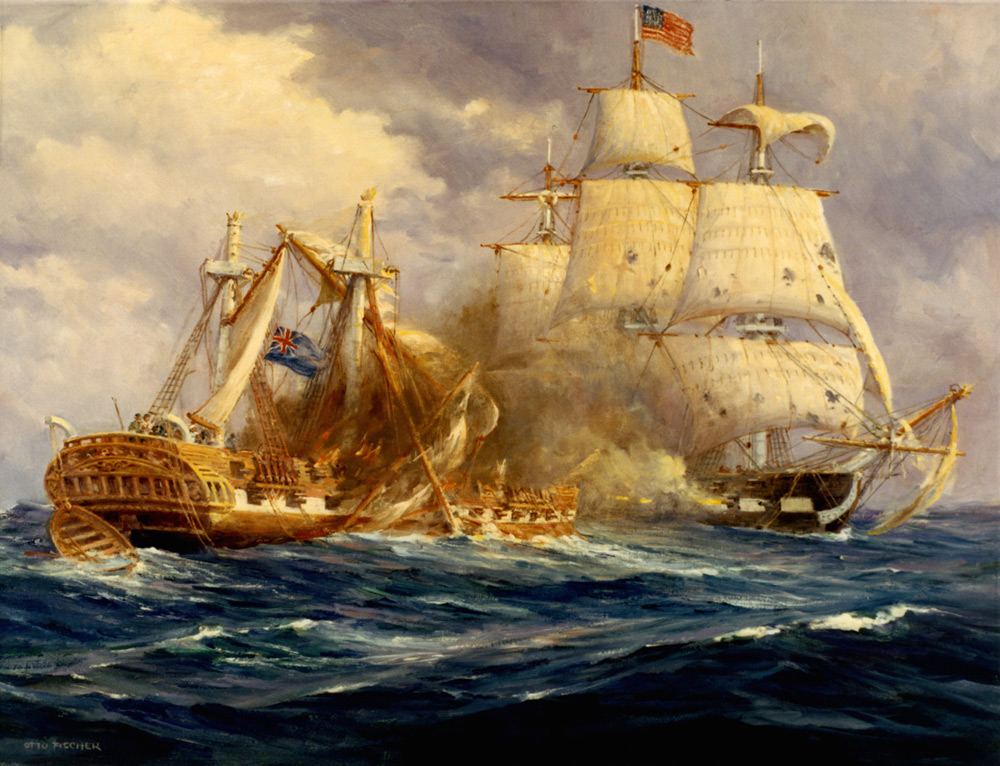
Constitution and Guerriere in battle

A frigate was sighted on 19 August and subsequently determined to be HMS Guerriere (38) under Captain James Dacres with the words "Not The Little Belt" painted on her foretopsail. (Note: The words painted on the sail were in reference to the Little Belt affair, when USS President had fired on HMS Little Belt the year before. Captain John Rodgers of President had mistakenly identified Little Belt as Guerriere, and Captain James Dacres of Guerriere had written a challenge of combat to him.) Guerriere opened fire upon entering range of Constitution, doing little damage. After a few exchanges of cannon fire between the ships, Captain Hull maneuvered Constitution into an advantageous position within 25 yards (23 m) of Guerriere. He then ordered a full double-loaded broadside of grape and round shot, which took out Guerriere's mizzenmast. Guerriere's maneuverability decreased with her mizzenmast dragging in the water, and she collided with Constitution, entangling her bowsprit in Constitution's mizzen rigging. This left only Guerriere's bow guns capable of effective fire. Hull's cabin caught fire from the shots, but it was quickly extinguished. With the ships locked together, both Hull and Dacres ordered boarding parties into action, but the sea was heavy and neither party was able to board the opposing ship.

At one point, the two ships rotated together counter-clockwise, with Constitution continuing to fire broadsides. When the two ships pulled apart, the force of the bowsprit's extraction sent shock waves through Guerriere's rigging. Her foremast collapsed, and that brought the mainmast down shortly afterward. Guerriere was now a dismasted, unmanageable hulk with close to a third of her crew wounded or killed, while Constitution remained largely intact. Dacres was eventually brought onto Constitution where he presented his sword to Hull as a sign of surrender, but Hull refused to accept it saying he could not accept the sword from a man who had fought so gallantly.

Hull had surprised the crew of Guerriere with his ship's heavier broadsides and sailing ability. Adding to their astonishment, many of Guerriere's shots had rebounded harmlessly off Constitution's hull. An American sailor reportedly exclaimed "Huzzah! Her sides are made of iron!" and Constitution acquired the nickname "Old Ironsides". The battle left Guerriere so badly damaged that she was not worth towing to port, and Hull ordered her to be burned the next morning, after transferring the British prisoners onto Constitution. Constitution arrived back in Boston on 30 August, where Hull and his crew found that their news of their victory spread fast, and they were hailed as heroes.

=== Constitution vs Java ===
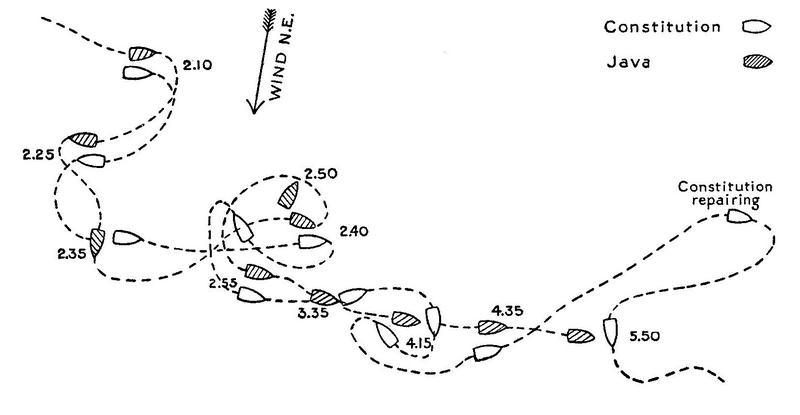
Diagram of the battle between Constitution and Java

William Bainbridge, senior to Hull, took command of "Old Ironsides" on 8 September and prepared her for another mission in British shipping lanes near Brazil, sailing with Hornet on 27 October. They arrived near São Salvador on 13 December, sighting HMS Bonne Citoyenne in the harbor. Bonne Citoyenne was reportedly carrying $1.6 million in spice to England, and her captain refused to leave the neutral harbor lest he lose his cargo. Constitution sailed offshore in search of prizes, leaving Hornet to await the departure of Bonne Citoyenne. On 29 December, she met with HMS Java under Captain Henry Lambert. At the initial hail from Bainbridge, Java answered with a broadside that severely damaged Constitution's rigging. She was able to recover, however, and returned a series of broadsides to Java. A shot from Java destroyed Constitution's helm (wheel), so Bainbridge directed the crew to steer her manually using the tiller for the remainder of the engagement. Bainbridge was wounded twice during the battle. Java's bowsprit became entangled in Constitution's rigging, as in the battle with Guerriere, allowing Bainbridge to continue raking her with broadsides. Java's foremast collapsed, sending her fighting top crashing down through two decks below.

Bainbridge drew off to make emergency repairs and re-approached Java an hour later. She was a shambles, an unmanageable wreck with a badly wounded crew, and she surrendered. Bainbridge determined that Java was far too damaged to retain as a prize and ordered her burned, but not before having her helm salvaged and installed on Constitution. Constitution returned to São Salvador on 1 January 1813 to disembark the prisoners of Java, where she met with Hornet and her two British prizes. Bainbridge ordered Constitution to sail for Boston on 5 January, being far away from a friendly port and needing extensive repairs, leaving Hornet behind to continue waiting for Bonne Citoyenne in the hopes that she would leave the harbor, though she did not. Java was the third British warship in three months to be captured by U.S. Navy, and Constitution's victory prompted the British Admiralty to order all Royal Navy frigates not to engage the heavier American frigates one-on-one; only British ships of the line or squadrons were permitted to attack them. Constitution arrived in Boston on 15 February to even greater celebrations than Hull had received a few months earlier.

=== Marblehead and blockade ===
Bainbridge determined that Constitution required new spar deck planking and beams, masts, sails, and rigging, as well as replacement of her copper bottom. However, personnel and supplies were being diverted to the Great Lakes, causing shortages that kept her in Boston intermittently with her sister ships Chesapeake, Congress, and President for the majority of the year. Charles Stewart took command on 18 July and struggled to complete the construction and recruitment of a new crew, finally making sail on 31 December. She set course for the West Indies to harass British shipping and had captured five merchant ships and the 14-gun HMS Pictou by late March 1814. She also pursued HMS Columbine and HMS Pique, though both ships escaped after realizing that she was an American frigate.

Her mainmast split off the coast of Bermuda on 27 March, requiring immediate repair. Stewart set a course for Boston, where British ships HMS Junon and Tenedos commenced pursuit on 3 April. Stewart ordered drinking water and food to be cast overboard to lighten her load and gain speed, trusting that her mainmast would hold together long enough for her to make her way into Marblehead, Massachusetts. The last item thrown overboard was the supply of spirits. Upon Constitution's arrival in the harbor, the citizens of Marblehead rallied in support, assembling what cannons they possessed at Fort Sewall, and the British called off the pursuit. Two weeks later, Constitution made her way into Boston, where she remained blockaded in port until mid-December.

=== HMS Cyane and HMS Levant ===
Captain George Collier of the Royal Navy received command of the 50-gun HMS Leander and was sent to North America to deal with the American frigates targeting British shipping. Meanwhile, Charles Stewart saw his chance to escape from Boston Harbor and made her good on the afternoon of 18 December, and Constitution again set course for Bermuda. Collier gathered a squadron consisting of Leander, Newcastle, and Acasta and set off in pursuit, but he was unable to overtake her. On 24 December, Constitution intercepted the merchantman Lord Nelson and placed a prize crew aboard. Constitution had left Boston not fully supplied, but Lord Nelson's stores supplied a Christmas dinner for the crew.

Constitution was cruising off Cape Finisterre on 8 February 1815 when Stewart learned that the Treaty of Ghent had been signed. He realized, however, that a state of war still existed until the treaty was ratified, and Constitution captured the British merchantman Susanna on 16 February; her cargo of animal hides was valued at $75,000.

On 20 February, Constitution sighted the small British ships Cyane and Levant sailing in company and gave chase. Cyane and Levant began a series of broadsides against her, but Stewart outmaneuvered both of them and forced Levant to draw off for repairs. He concentrated fire on Cyane, which soon struck her colors. Levant returned to engage Constitution but she turned and attempted to escape when she saw that Cyane had been defeated. Constitution overtook her and, after several more broadsides, she struck her colors. Stewart remained with his new prizes overnight while ordering repairs to all ships. Constitution had suffered little damage in the battle, though it was later discovered that she had twelve 32-pound British cannonballs embedded in her hull, none of which had penetrated. The trio then set a course for the Cape Verde Islands and arrived at Porto Praya on 10 March.

The next morning, Collier's squadron was spotted on a course for the harbor, and Stewart ordered all ships to sail immediately; he had been unaware until then of Collier's pursuit. Cyane was able to elude the squadron and make sail for America, where she arrived on 10 April, but Levant was overtaken and recaptured. Collier's squadron was distracted with Levant while Constitution made another escape from overwhelming forces.

Constitution set a course towards Guinea and then west towards Brazil, as Stewart had learned from the capture of Susanna that HMS Inconstant was transporting gold bullion back to England, and he wanted her as a prize. Constitution put into Maranhão on 2 April to offload her British prisoners and replenish her drinking water. While there, Stewart learned by rumor that the Treaty of Ghent had been ratified, and set course for America, receiving verification of peace at San Juan, Puerto Rico, on 28 April. He then set course for New York and arrived home on 15 May to large celebrations. Constitution emerged from the war undefeated, though her sister ships Chesapeake and President were not so fortunate, having been captured in 1813 and 1815 respectively. Constitution was moved to Boston and placed in ordinary in January 1816, sitting out the Second Barbary War.

=== Mediterranean Squadron ===
Charlestown Navy Yard's commandant Isaac Hull directed a refitting of Constitution to prepare her for duty with the Mediterranean Squadron in April 1820. They removed Joshua Humphreys' diagonal riders to make room for two iron freshwater tanks, and they replaced the copper sheathing and timbers below the waterline. At the direction of Secretary of the Navy Smith Thompson, she was also subjected to an unusual experiment in which manually operated paddle wheels were fitted to her hull. The paddle wheels were designed to propel her at up to 3 knots (5.6 km/h; 3.5 mph) if she was ever becalmed, by the crew using the ship's capstan. Initial testing was successful, but Hull and Constitution's commanding officer Jacob Jones were reportedly unimpressed with paddle wheels on a US Navy ship. Jones had them removed and stowed in the cargo hold before he departed on 13 May 1821 for a three-year tour of duty in the Mediterranean. On 12 April 1823, she collided with the British merchant ship Bicton in the Mediterranean Sea, and Bicton sank with the loss of her captain.

Constitution otherwise experienced an uneventful tour, sailing in company with Ontario and Nonsuch, until crew behavior during shore leave gave Jones a reputation as a commodore who was lax in discipline. The Navy grew weary of receiving complaints about the crews' antics while in port and ordered Jones to return. Constitution arrived in Boston on 31 May 1824, and Jones was relieved of command. Thomas Macdonough took command and sailed on 29 October for the Mediterranean under the direction of John Rodgers in North Carolina. With discipline restored, Constitution resumed uneventful duty. Macdonough resigned his command for health reasons on 9 October 1825. Constitution put in for repairs during December and into January 1826, until Daniel Todd Patterson assumed command on 21 February. By August, she had been put into Port Mahon, suffering decay of her spar deck, and she remained there until temporary repairs were completed in March 1827. Constitution returned to Boston on 4 July 1828 and was placed in reserve.

== Old Ironsides ==
Constitution was built in an era when a ship's expected service life was 10 to 15 years. Secretary of the Navy John Branch made a routine order for surveys of ships in the reserve fleet, and commandant of the Charlestown Navy Yard Charles Morris estimated a repair cost of over $157,000 for Constitution. On 14 September 1830, an article appeared in the Boston Advertiser which erroneously claimed that the Navy intended to scrap Constitution. (Note: The Advertiser reported that the Secretary of the Navy had ordered her to be sold or broken up. Martin presents a valid argument and explanation of Navy procedures for aging ships as to why this was not true and must have been misreported.) Two days later, the poem "Old Ironsides" by Oliver Wendell Holmes was published in the same newspaper and, soon, republished throughout the country. The poem ignited public indignation and inciting efforts to save "Old Ironsides" from the scrap yard. Secretary Branch approved the costs, and Constitution began a leisurely repair period while awaiting completion of the dry dock then under construction at the yard. Her renovation had been approved in February 1831, but the dry dock would not be complete for another two years, delaying the work. In contrast to the efforts to save Constitution, another round of surveys in 1834 found her sister ship Congress unfit for repair; she was unceremoniously broken up in 1835.

On 24 June 1833, Constitution entered dry dock. Captain Jesse Elliott, the new commander of the Navy yard, oversaw her reconstruction. Constitution had 30 in (760 mm) of hog in her keel and remained in dry dock until 21 June 1834. This was the first of many times that souvenirs were made from her old planking; Isaac Hull ordered walking canes, picture frames, and even a phaeton, which was presented to President Andrew Jackson. By early 1835 she was again in usable condition.

Meanwhile, Elliott directed the installation of a new figurehead of President Jackson under the bowsprit, which became a subject of much controversy due to Jackson's political unpopularity in Boston at the time. Elliot was a Jacksonian Democrat, and he received death threats. Rumors circulated about the citizens of Boston storming the navy yard to remove the figurehead themselves.

A merchant captain named Samuel Dewey accepted a small wager as to whether he could complete the task of removal. Elliot had posted guards on Constitution to ensure the safety of the figurehead, but Dewey crossed the Charles River in a small boat, using the noise of thunderstorms to mask his movements, and managed to saw off most of Jackson's head. The severed head made the rounds between taverns and meeting houses in Boston until Dewey personally returned it to Secretary of the Navy Mahlon Dickerson; it remained on Dickerson's library shelf for many years. The addition of busts to her stern escaped controversy of any kind, depicting Isaac Hull, William Bainbridge, and Charles Stewart; the busts remained in place for the next 40 years.

=== Mediterranean and Pacific Squadrons ===
Elliot was appointed captain of Constitution and got underway in March 1835 to New York, where he ordered repairs to the Jackson figurehead, avoiding a second round of controversy. Departing on 16 March Constitution set a course for France to deliver Edward Livingston to his post as Minister. She arrived on 10 April and began the return voyage on 16 May. She arrived back in Boston on 23 June, then sailed on 19 August to take her station as flagship in the Mediterranean, arriving at Port Mahon on 19 September. Her duty over the next two years was uneventful as she and United States made routine patrols and diplomatic visits. From April 1837 into February 1838, Elliot collected various ancient artifacts to carry back to America, adding various livestock during the return voyage. Constitution arrived in Norfolk on 31 July. Elliot was later suspended from duty for transporting livestock on a Navy ship.

As the flagship of the Pacific Squadron under the command of Captain Daniel Turner, she began her next voyage on 1 March 1839 with the duty of patrolling the western coast of South America. Often spending months in one port or another, she visited Valparaíso, Callao, Paita, and Puna while her crew amused themselves with the beaches and taverns in each locality. The return voyage found her at Rio de Janeiro, where Emperor Pedro II of Brazil visited her about 29 August 1841. Departing Rio, she returned to Norfolk on 31 October. On 22 June 1842, she was recommissioned under the command of Foxhall Alexander Parker for duty with the Home Squadron. After spending months in port she put to sea for three weeks during December, then was again put in ordinary.

=== Around the world ===
In late 1843, she was moored at Norfolk, serving as a receiving ship. Naval Constructor Foster Rhodes calculated that it would require $70,000 to make her seaworthy. Acting Secretary David Henshaw faced a dilemma. His budget could not support such a cost, yet he could not allow the country's favorite ship to deteriorate. He turned to Captain John Percival, known in the service as "Mad Jack". The captain traveled to Virginia and conducted his own survey of the ship's needs. He reported that the necessary repairs and upgrades could be done at a cost of $10,000. On 6 November, Henshaw told Percival to proceed without delay, but stay within his projected figure. After several months of labor, Percival reported Constitution ready for "a two or even a three-year cruise."

She got underway on 29 May 1844 carrying Ambassador to Brazil Henry A. Wise and his family, arriving at Rio de Janeiro on 2 August after making two port visits along the way. She sailed again on 8 September, making port calls at Madagascar, Mozambique, and Zanzibar, and arriving at Sumatra on 1 January 1845. Many of her crew began to suffer from dysentery and fevers, causing several deaths, which led Percival to set course for Singapore, arriving there 8 February. While in Singapore, Commodore Henry Ducie Chads of HMS Cambrian paid a visit to Constitution, offering what medical assistance his squadron could provide. Chads had been the Lieutenant of Java when she surrendered to William Bainbridge 33 years earlier. The relationship between the United States and Brunei began on 6 April, when she was anchored in Brunei Bay in which a Treaty of Peace, Friendship, Commerce and Navigation was formed.

Leaving Singapore, Constitution arrived at Turon, Cochinchina (present-day Da Nang, Vietnam), on 10 May. Not long after, Percival was informed that French missionary Dominique Lefèbvre was being held captive under sentence of death. He went ashore with a squad of Marines to speak with the local Mandarin. Percival demanded the return of Lefèbvre and took three local leaders hostage to ensure that his demands were met. When no communication was forthcoming, he ordered the capture of three junks, which were brought to Constitution. He released the hostages after two days, attempting to show good faith towards the Mandarin, who had demanded their return. During a storm, the three junks escaped upriver; a detachment of Marines pursued and recaptured them. The supply of food and water from shore was stopped, and Percival gave in to another demand for the release of the junks in order to keep his ship supplied, expecting Lefèbvre to be released. He soon realized that no return would be made, however, and Percival ordered Constitution to depart on 26 May.

She arrived at Canton, China, on 20 June and spent the next six weeks there, while Percival made shore and diplomatic visits. Again the crew suffered from dysentery due to poor drinking water, resulting in three more deaths by the time that she reached Manila on 18 September, spending a week there preparing to enter the Pacific Ocean. She then sailed on 28 September for the Hawaiian Islands, arriving at Honolulu on 16 November. She found Commodore John D. Sloat and his flagship Savannah there; Sloat informed Percival that Constitution was needed in Mexico, as the United States was preparing for war after the Texas annexation. She provisioned for six months and sailed for Mazatlán, arriving there on 13 January 1846. She sat at anchor for more than three months until she was finally allowed to sail for home on 22 April, rounding Cape Horn on 4 July. Arriving in Rio de Janeiro, the ship's party learned that the Mexican War had begun on 13 May, soon after their departure from Mazatlán. She arrived home in Boston on 27 September and was mothballed on 5 October.

=== Mediterranean and African Squadrons ===
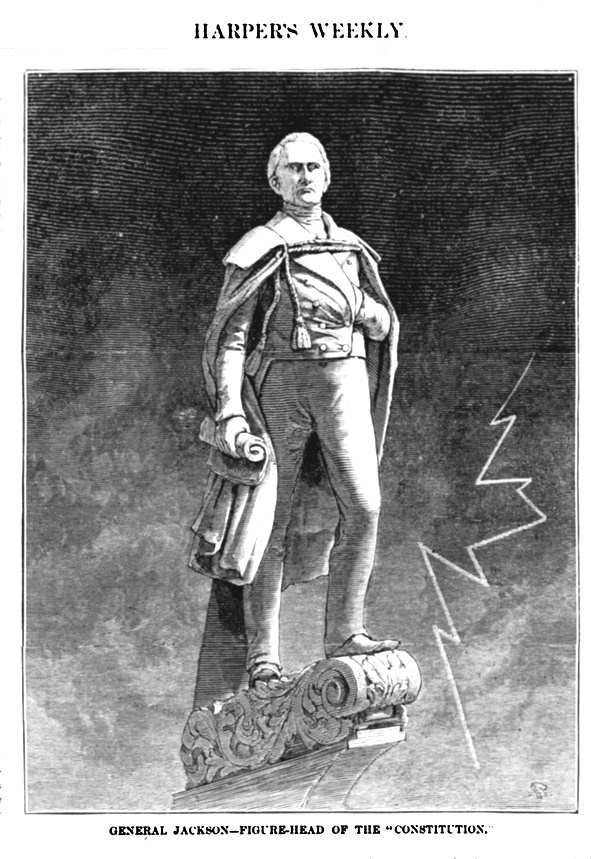
The Andrew Jackson figurehead as depicted by Harpers Weekly in 1875

Constitution began a refitting for duty with the Mediterranean Squadron, entering dry dock in January 1848. The figurehead of Andrew Jackson that caused so much controversy 15 years earlier was replaced with another likeness of Jackson, this time without a top hat and with a more Napoleonic pose. Captain John Gwinn commanded her on this voyage, departing on 9 December 1848 and arriving at Tripoli on 19 January 1849. She received King Ferdinand II and Pope Pius IX on board at Gaeta on 1 August, giving them a 21-gun salute. This was the first time that a Pope set foot on American territory or its equivalent.

At Palermo on 1 September, Captain Gwinn died of chronic gastritis and was buried near Lazaretto on the 9th. Captain Thomas Conover assumed command on the 18th and resumed routine patrolling for the rest of the tour, heading home on 1 December 1850. She was involved in a severe collision with the English brig Confidence, cutting her in half, which sank with the loss of her captain. The surviving crew members were carried back to America, where Constitution was put in ordinary once again, this time at the Brooklyn Navy Yard, in January 1851.

Constitution was recommissioned on 22 December 1852 under the command of John Rudd. She carried Commodore Isaac Mayo for duty with the African Squadron, departing the yard on 2 March 1853 on a leisurely sail towards Africa and arriving there on 18 June. Mayo made a diplomatic visit in Liberia, arranging a treaty between the Gbarbo and the Grebo tribes. Mayo resorted to firing cannons into the village of the Gbarbo in order to get them to agree to the treaty. About 22 June 1854, he arranged another peace treaty, between the leaders of Grahway and Half Cavally. On 31 July 1854, he arranged a compact with the King of Lagos.

Constitution took the American ship H.N. Gambrill as a prize near Angola on 3 November. H.N. Gambrill was involved in the slave trade and proved to be Constitution's final capture. The rest of her tour passed uneventfully and she sailed for home on 31 March 1855. She was diverted to Havana, Cuba, arriving there on 16 May and departing on the 24th. She arrived at Portsmouth Navy Yard and was decommissioned on 14 June, ending her last duty on the front lines.

=== Civil War ===
Since the formation of the US Naval Academy in 1845, there had been a growing need for quarters in which to house the students (midshipmen). In 1857, Constitution was moved to dry dock at the Portsmouth Navy Yard for conversion into a training ship. Some of the earliest known photographs of her were taken during this refitting, which added classrooms on her spar and gun decks and reduced her armament to only 16 guns. Her rating was changed to a "2nd rate ship". She was recommissioned on 1 August 1860 and moved from Portsmouth to the Naval Academy.

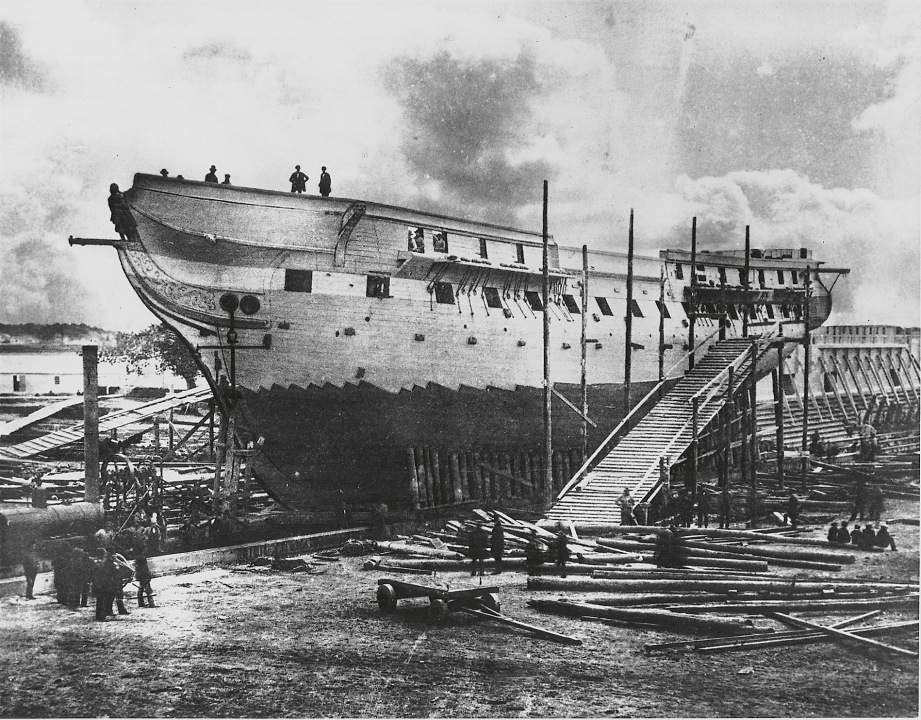
The earliest known photograph of Constitution, undergoing repairs in 1858

At the outbreak of the Civil War in April 1861, Constitution was ordered to relocate farther north after threats had been made against her by Confederate sympathizers. Several companies of Massachusetts volunteer soldiers were stationed aboard for her protection. R. R. Cuyler towed her to New York City, where she arrived on 29 April. She was subsequently relocated, along with the Naval Academy, to Fort Adams in Newport, Rhode Island, for the duration of the war. Her sister ship United States was abandoned by the Union and then captured by Confederate forces at the Gosport Shipyard, leaving Constitution the only remaining frigate of the original six.

The Navy launched an ironclad on 10 May 1862 as part of the South Atlantic Blockading Squadron, and they bestowed on her the name New Ironsides to honor Constitution's tradition of service. However, New Ironsides' naval career was short, as she was destroyed by fire on 16 December 1865. In August 1865, Constitution moved back to Annapolis, along with the rest of the Naval Academy. During the voyage, she was allowed to drop her tow lines from the tug and continue alone under wind power. Despite her age, she was recorded running at 9 knots (17 km/h; 10 mph) and arrived at Hampton Roads ten hours ahead of the tug. Andersonville Prisoners- "Thorp and his fellow soldiers were transported to Jacksonville, Fla., then on USS Constitution to "Camp Parole" in Annapolis, Md. There, they were issued rations, clothing and back pay before being sent to their respective regimental headquarters for discharge."

As Constitution settled in again at the academy, a series of upgrades was installed that included steam pipes and radiators to supply heat from shore, along with gas lighting. From June to August each year, she would depart with midshipmen for their summer training cruise and then return to operate for the rest of the year as a classroom. In June 1867, her last known plank owner William Bryant died in Maine. George Dewey assumed command in November; he served as her commanding officer until 1870. In 1871, her condition had deteriorated to the point where she was retired as a training ship, and then towed to the Philadelphia Navy Yard, where she was placed in ordinary on 26 September.

=== Paris Exposition ===
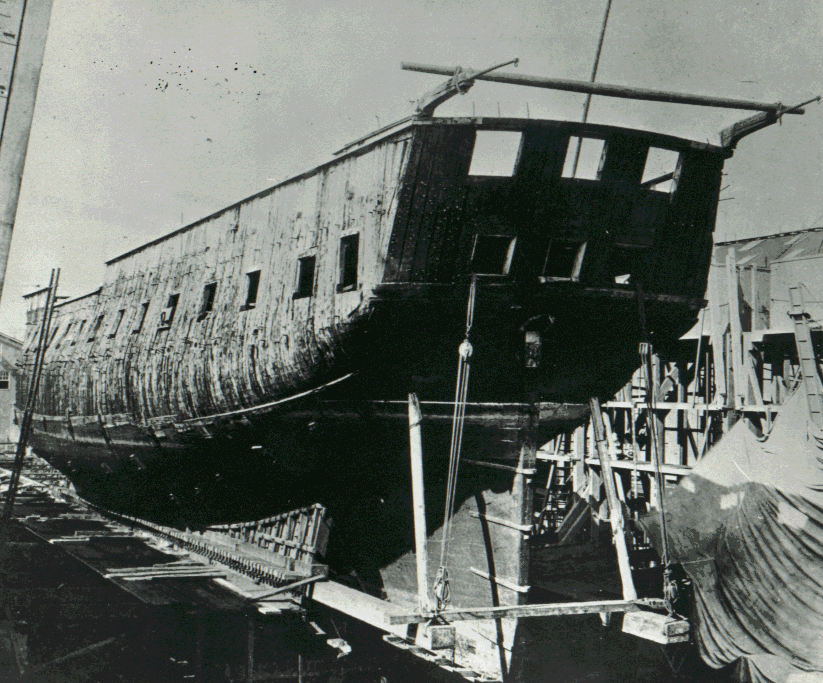
Philadelphia Navy Yard 1874

Constitution was overhauled beginning in 1873 in order to participate in the centennial celebrations of the United States. Work began slowly and was intermittently delayed by the transition of the Philadelphia Navy Yard to League Island. By late 1875, the Navy opened bids for an outside contractor to complete the work, and Constitution was moved to Wood, Dialogue, and Company in May 1876, where a coal bin and a small boiler for heat were installed. The Andrew Jackson figurehead was removed at this time and given to the Naval Academy Museum, where it remains today. Her construction dragged on during the rest of 1876 until the centennial celebrations had long passed, and the Navy decided that she would be used as a training and school ship for apprentices.

Oscar C. Badger took command on 9 January 1878 to prepare her for a voyage to the Paris Exposition of 1878, transporting artwork and industrial displays to France. Three railroad cars were lashed to her spar deck and all but two cannons were removed when she departed on 4 March. While docking at Le Havre, she collided with Ville de Paris, which resulted in Constitution entering dry dock for repairs and remaining in France for the rest of 1878. She got underway for the United States on 16 January 1879, but poor navigation ran her aground the next day near Bollard Head, Dorset, United Kingdom. She was refloated with the assistance of the tugs Commodore, Lightning, Lothair, Royal Albert, Malta and Telegraph. She was towed into the Portsmouth Naval Dockyard, Hampshire, England, where only minor damage was found and repaired.

Her problem-plagued voyage continued on 13 February when her rudder was damaged during heavy storms, resulting in a total loss of steering control, with the rudder smashing into the hull at random. Three crewmen went over the stern on ropes and boatswain's chairs and secured it. The next morning, they rigged a temporary steering system. Badger set a course for the nearest port, and she arrived in Lisbon on 18 February. Slow dock services delayed her departure until 11 April and her voyage home did not end until 24 May. Carpenter's Mate Henry Williams, Captain of the Top Joseph Matthews, and Captain of the Top James Horton received the Medal of Honor for their actions in repairing the damaged rudder at sea. Constitution returned to her previous duties of training apprentice boys, and Ship's Corporal James Thayer received a Medal of Honor for saving a fellow crew member from drowning on 16 November.

Over the next two years, she continued her training cruises, but it soon became apparent that her overhaul in 1876 had been of poor quality, and in 1881 she was determined to be unfit for service. Funds were lacking for another overhaul, so she was decommissioned, ending her days as an active-duty naval ship. She was moved to the Portsmouth Navy Yard and used as a receiving ship. There, she had a housing structure built over her spar deck, and her condition continued to deteriorate, with only a minimal amount of maintenance performed to keep her afloat. In 1896, Massachusetts Congressman John F. Fitzgerald became aware of her condition and proposed to Congress that funds be appropriated to restore her enough to return to Boston. She arrived at the Charlestown Navy Yard under tow on 21 September 1897 and, after her centennial celebrations in October, she lay there with an uncertain future.

== Museum ship ==
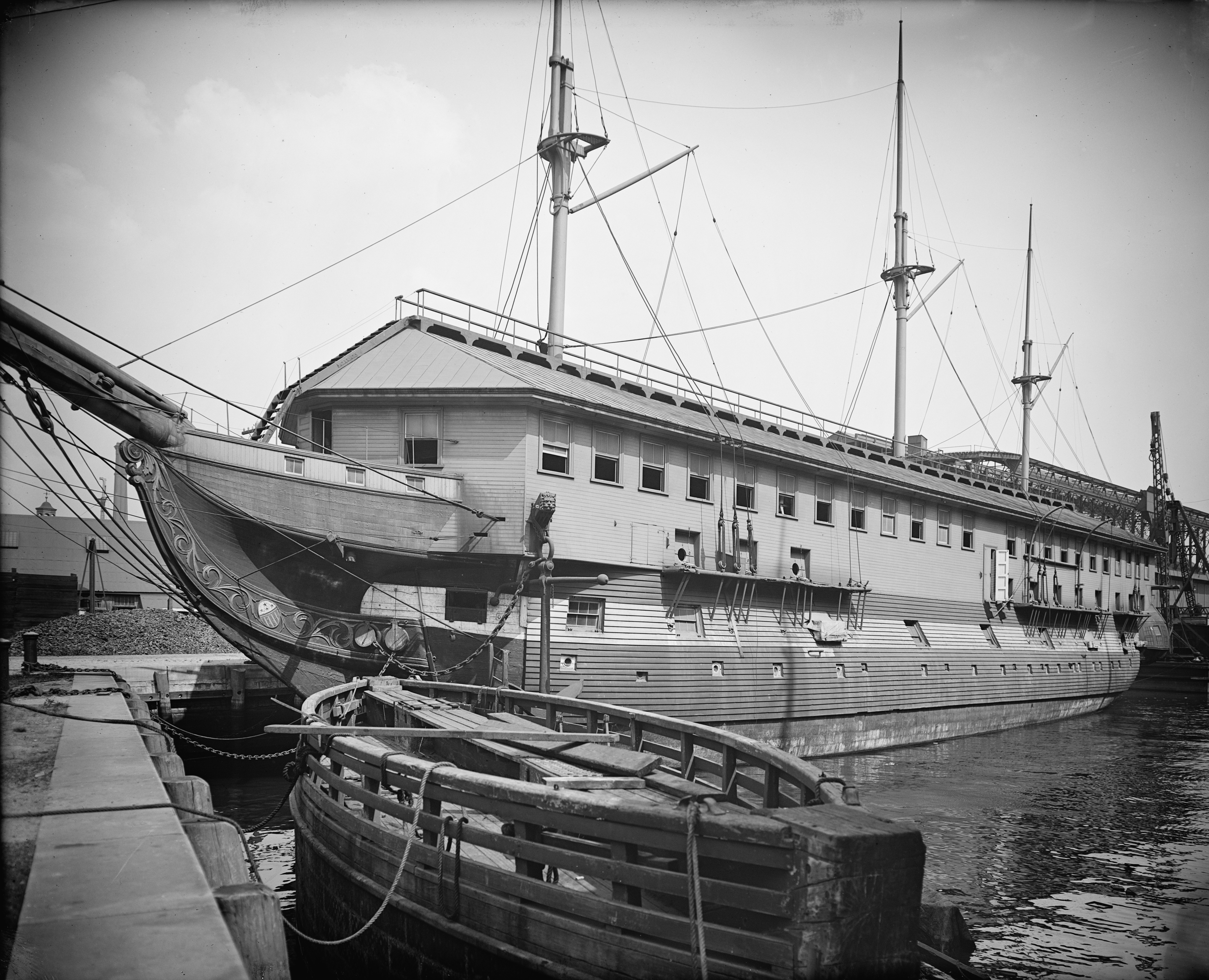
As a barracks ship in Boston c. 1905

In 1900, Congress authorized the restoration of Constitution but did not appropriate any funds for the project; funding was to be raised privately. The Massachusetts Society of the United Daughters of the War of 1812 spearheaded an effort to raise funds, but they ultimately failed. In 1903, the Massachusetts Historical Society's president Charles Francis Adams requested of Congress that Constitution be rehabilitated and placed back into active service.

In 1905, Secretary of the Navy Charles Joseph Bonaparte suggested that Constitution be towed out to sea and used as target practice, after which she would be allowed to sink. Moses H. Gulesian read about this in a Boston newspaper; he was a businessman from Worcester, Massachusetts, and he offered to purchase her for $10,000. The State Department refused, but Gulesian initiated a public campaign which began from Boston and ultimately "spilled all over the country." The storms of protest from the public prompted Congress to authorize $100,000 (~$2.68 million in 2025) in 1906 for the ship's restoration. First to be removed was the barracks structure on her spar deck, but the limited amount of funds allowed just a partial restoration. By 1907, Constitution began to serve as a museum ship, with tours offered to the public. On 1 December 1917, she was renamed Old Constitution to free her name for a planned new Lexington-class battlecruiser. The name Constitution was originally destined for the lead ship of the class, but was shuffled between hulls until CC-5 was given the name; construction of CC-5 was canceled in 1923 due to the Washington Naval Treaty. The incomplete hull was sold for scrap and Old Constitution was granted the return of her name on 24 July 1925.

=== 1925 restoration and tour ===
USS Constitution coming into Houston 1924

Admiral Edward Walter Eberle, Chief of Naval Operations, ordered the Board of Inspection and Survey to compile a report on her condition, and the inspection of 19 February 1924 found her in grave condition. Water had to be pumped out of her hold every day just to keep her afloat, and her stern was in danger of falling off. Almost all deck areas and structural components were filled with rot, and she was considered to be on the verge of ruin. Yet the Board recommended that she be thoroughly repaired in order to preserve her as long as possible. The estimated cost of repairs was $400,000. Secretary of the Navy Curtis D. Wilbur proposed to Congress that the required funds be raised privately, and he was authorized to assemble the committee charged with her restoration.

The first effort was sponsored by the national Elks Lodge. Programs presented to schoolchildren about "Old Ironsides" encouraged them to donate pennies towards her restoration, eventually raising $148,000. In the meantime, the estimates for repair began to climb, eventually reaching over $745,000 (~$10.8 million in 2025) after costs of materials were realized. In September 1926, Wilbur began to sell copies of a painting of Constitution at 50 cents per copy (equivalent to $9 in 2025). The silent film Old Ironsides portrayed Constitution during the First Barbary War. It premiered in December and helped spur more contributions to her restoration fund. The final campaign allowed memorabilia to be made of her discarded planking and metal. The committee eventually raised more than $600,000 after expenses, still short of the required amount, and Congress approved up to $300,000 to complete the restoration. The final cost of the restoration was $946,000 (equivalent to $11.3 million in 2025).

Lieutenant John A. Lord was selected to oversee the reconstruction project, and work began while fundraising efforts were still underway. Materials were difficult to find, especially the required live oak; Lord eventually uncovered a long-forgotten stash of live oak (some 1,500 short tons [1,400 t]) at Naval Air Station Pensacola, Florida, that had been cut in the 1850s for a shipbuilding program that never began. Constitution entered dry dock on 16 June 1927. Meanwhile, Charles Francis Adams had been appointed as Secretary of the Navy, and he proposed that Constitution make a three-year tour of the United States upon her completion, as a gift to the nation for its efforts to help restore her. Many amenities were installed, including water piping, modern toilet and shower facilities, electric lighting to make the interior visible for visitors, and several peloruses for ease of navigation. Forty miles (64 km) of rigging was made for Constitution at Charlestown Navy Yard ropewalk. When she emerged from dry dock on 15 March 1930, about 85 percent of the ship had been "renewed"—that is, replaced.

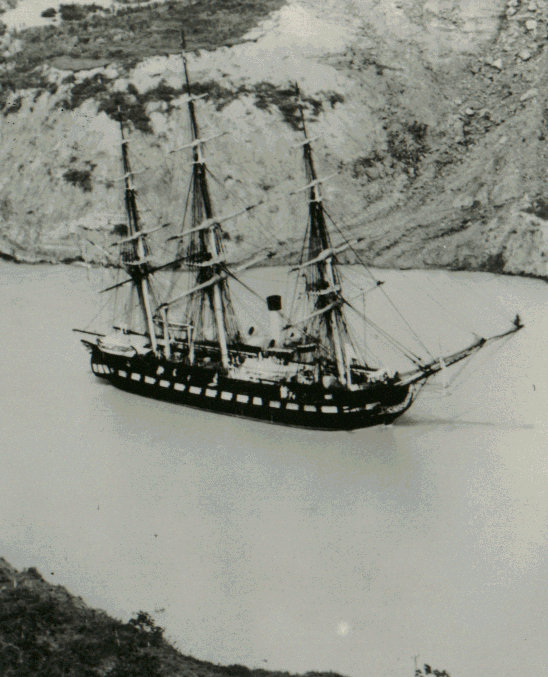
Transiting the Panama Canal 1932

Constitution was recommissioned on 1 July 1931 under the command of Commander Louis J. Gulliver with a crew of 60 officers and sailors, 15 Marines, and a pet monkey named Rosie as their mascot. The three-year tour planned to visit 90 port cities along the Atlantic, Gulf, and Pacific coasts. It began at Portsmouth, New Hampshire, with much celebration and a 21-gun salute. Towed by the minesweeper Grebe, she went as far north as Bar Harbor, Maine, south and into the Gulf of Mexico, then through the Panama Canal, and north again to Bellingham, Washington, on the Pacific Coast. Constitution returned to her home port of Boston in May 1934; more than 4.6 million people had visited her.

=== 1934 return to Boston ===
Constitution returned to serving as a museum ship, receiving 100,000 visitors per year in Boston. She was maintained by a small crew who were berthed on the ship, requiring more reliable heating. The heating was upgraded to a forced-air system in the 1950s, and a sprinkler system was added that protects her from fire. Constitution broke loose from her dock on 21 September 1938 during the New England Hurricane and was blown into Boston Harbor, where she collided with the destroyer Ralph Talbot; she suffered only minor damage.

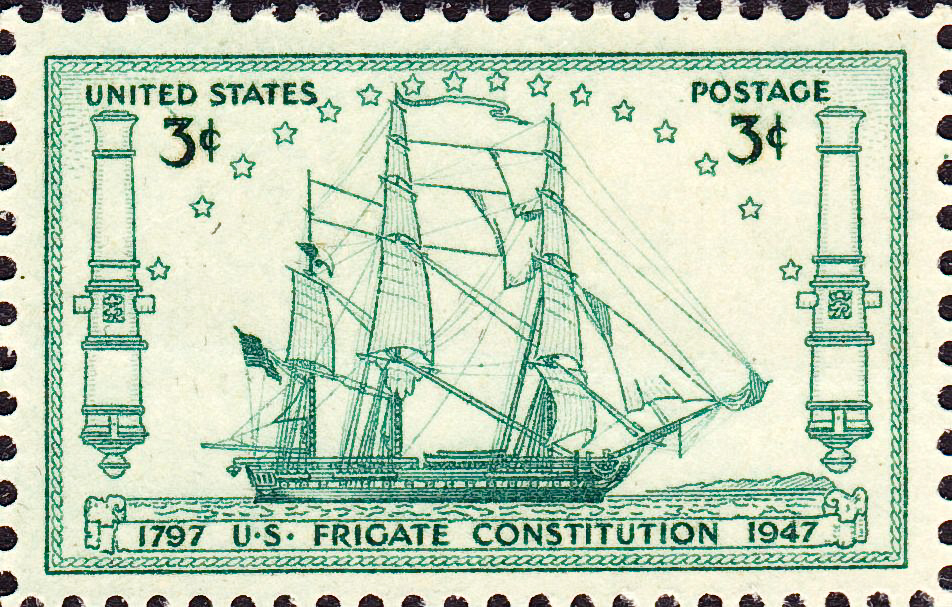
USS Constitution Commemorative stamp, 150th anniversary issue of 1947

With limited funds available, she experienced more deterioration over the years, and items began to disappear from the ship as souvenir hunters picked away at the more portable objects. Constitution and USS Constellation were recommissioned in 1940 at the request of President Franklin Roosevelt. Constitution was assigned the hull classification symbol IX-21. In early 1941, she began to serve as a brig for officers awaiting court-martial.

The United States Postal Service issued a stamp commemorating Constitution in 1947. An Act of Congress in 1954 made the Secretary of the Navy responsible for her upkeep. Under this legislation, Constitution was required to remain in Boston. On 19 December 1960, the United States Department of the Interior designated Constitution a National Historic Landmark. In December 1963, Constitution was docked at Charlestown for four months of repairs.

=== Restoration ===
In 1970, another survey was performed on her condition, finding that repairs were required but not as extensively as needed in the 1920s. The US Navy determined that a commander was required as commanding officer—typically someone with about 20 years of seniority; this would ensure the experience to organize the maintenance that she required. Funds were approved in 1972 for her restoration. She entered dry dock in April 1973, remaining until April 1974. During this period, large quantities of red oak were removed and replaced. The red oak had been added in the 1950s as an experiment to see if it would be more durable than the live oak, but it had mostly rotted away by 1970. Constitution again began receiving visitors in 1975.

=== Bicentennial celebrations ===
Commander Tyrone G. Martin became her captain in August 1974, as preparations began for the upcoming United States Bicentennial celebrations. He set the precedent that all construction work on Constitution was to be aimed towards maintaining her to the 1812 configuration for which she is most noted. In September 1975, her hull classification of IX-21 was officially canceled.

The privately run USS Constitution Museum opened on 8 April 1976, and Commander Martin dedicated a tract of land as "Constitution Grove" one month later, located at the Naval Surface Warfare Center in Indiana. The 25,000 acres (100 km^{2}) now supply the majority of the white oak required for repair work. On 10 July, Constitution led the parade of tall ships up Boston Harbor for Operation Sail, firing her guns at one-minute intervals for the first time in approximately 100 years. On 11 July, she rendered a 21-gun salute to Her Majesty's Yacht Britannia, as Queen Elizabeth II and Prince Philip arrived for a state visit. The royal couple were piped aboard and privately toured the ship for approximately 30 minutes with Commander Martin and Secretary of the Navy J. William Middendorf. Upon their departure, the crew of Constitution rendered three cheers for the Queen. Over 900,000 visitors toured "Old Ironsides" that year.

Constitution received the Coast Guard Meritorious Unit Commendation for the period 4 August 1989 to 4 August 1990.

=== 1992–1995 dry docking and reconstruction ===
Constitution entered dry dock in 1992 for an inspection and minor repair period that turned out to be her most comprehensive structural restoration and repair since she was launched in 1797. Multiple refittings over the 200 years of her career had removed most of her original construction components and design, as her mission changed from a fighting warship to a training ship and eventually to a receiving ship. In 1993, the Naval History & Heritage Command Detachment Boston reviewed Humphreys' original plans and identified five main structural components that were required to prevent hogging of the hull, as Constitution had 13 in (330 mm) of hog at that point. Using a 1:16 scale model of the ship, they were able to determine that restoring the original components would result in a 10% increase in hull stiffness.

Three hundred scans were completed on her timbers using radiography to find any hidden problems otherwise undetectable from the outside—technology that was unavailable during previous reconstructions. The repair crew used sound-wave testing, aided by the United States Forest Service's Forest Products Laboratory, to determine the condition of the remaining timbers that might have been rotting from the inside. The 13 in (330 mm) of hog was removed from her keel by allowing the ship to settle naturally while in dry dock. The most difficult task was the procurement of timber in the quantity and sizes needed, as was the case during her 1920s restoration as well. The city of Charleston, South Carolina, donated live-oak trees that had been felled by Hurricane Hugo in 1989, and the International Paper Company donated live oak from its own property. The project continued to reconstruct her to 1812 specifications, even as she remained open to visitors who were allowed to observe the process and converse with workers. The $12 million project was completed in 1995.

=== Sailing on 200th anniversary ===
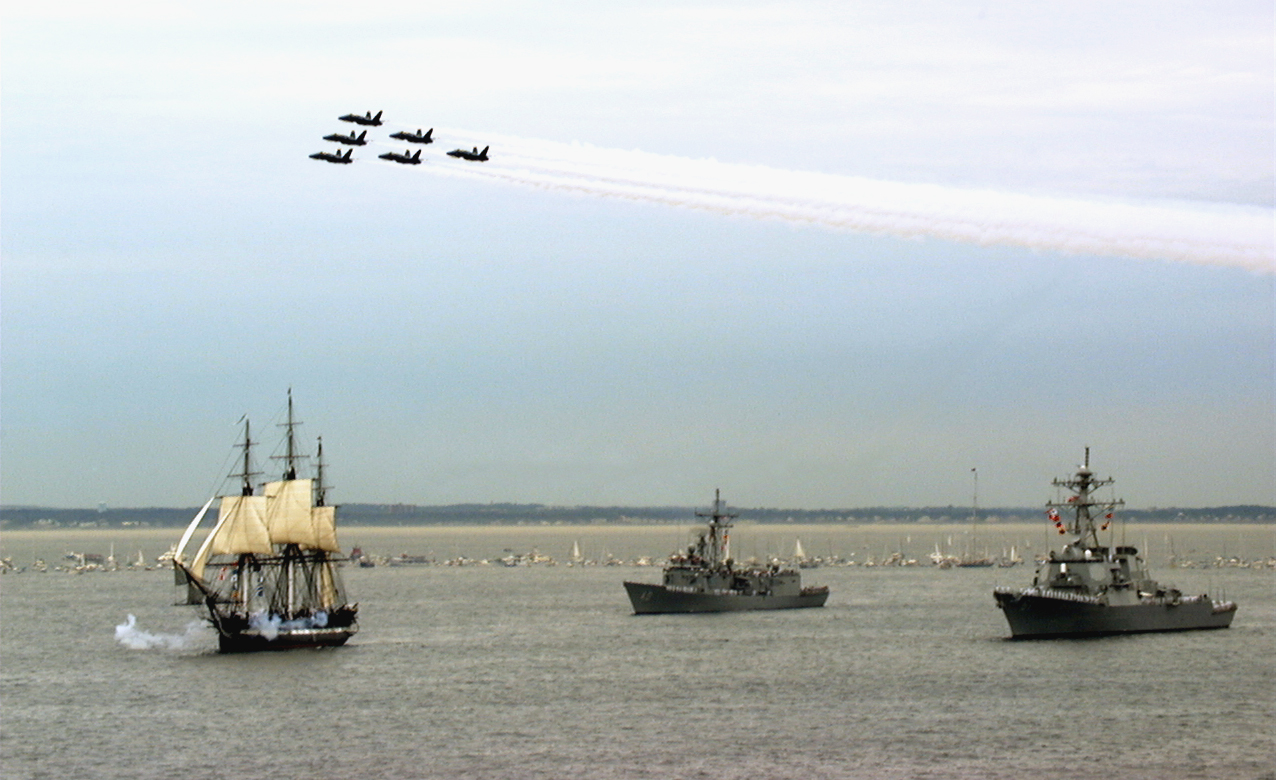
Constitution sails unassisted for the first time in 116 years, 21 July 1997.

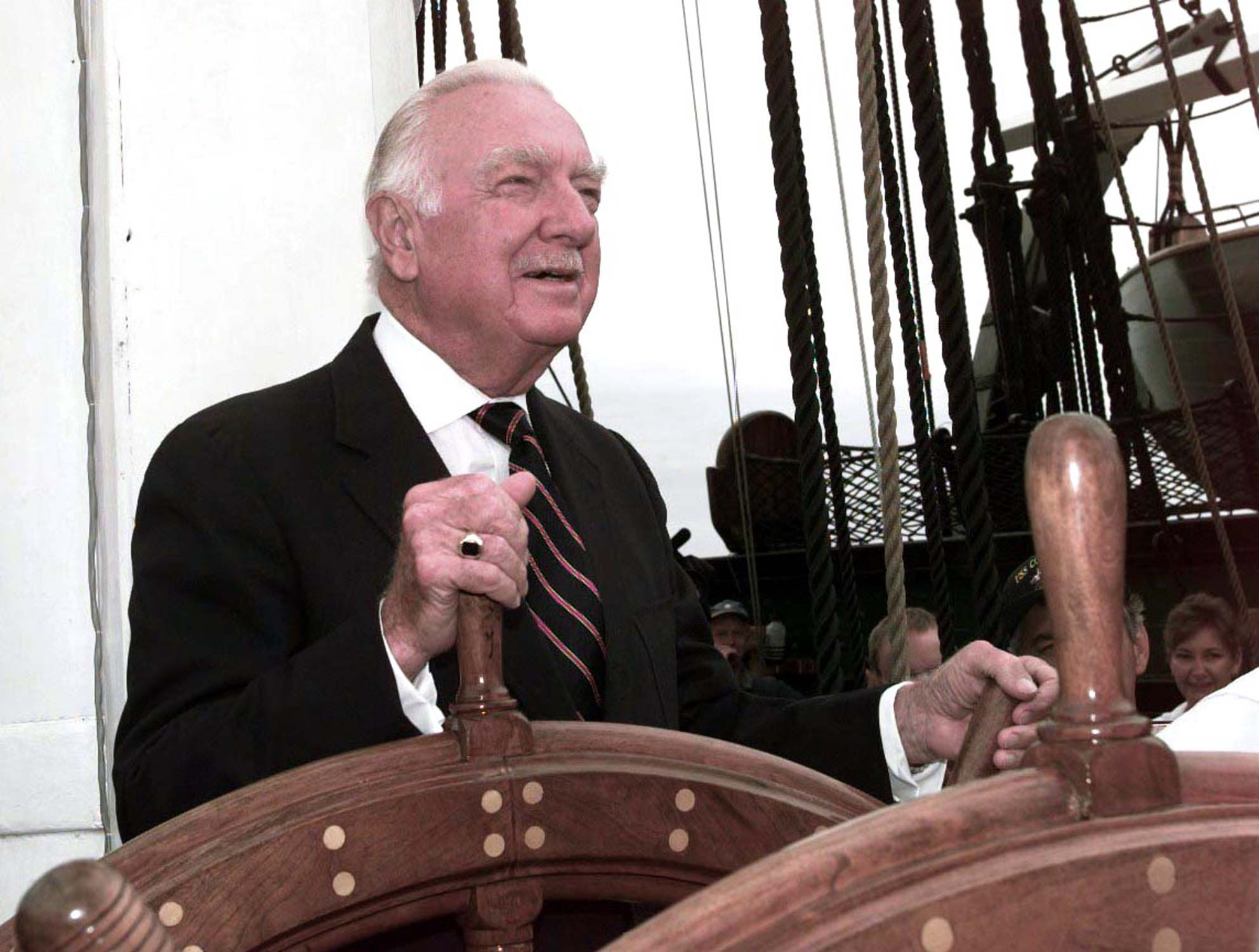
Walter Cronkite takes the helm.

As early as 1991, Commander David Cashman had suggested that Constitution should sail to celebrate her 200th anniversary in 1997 rather than being towed. The proposal was approved, though it was thought to be a large undertaking since she had not sailed in over 100 years. When she emerged from dry dock in 1995, a more serious effort began to prepare her for sail. As in the 1920s, education programs aimed at school children helped collect pennies to purchase the sails to make the voyage possible. Her six-sail battle configuration consisted of jibs, topsails, and driver.

Commander Mike Beck began training the crew for the historic sail using an 1819 Navy sailing manual and several months of practice, including time spent aboard the Coast Guard cutter Eagle. On 20 July, Constitution was towed from her usual berth in Boston to an overnight mooring in Marblehead, Massachusetts. En route, she made her first sail in 116 years, at a recorded 6 knots (11 km/h; 6.9 mph).

On 21 July, she was towed 5 nautical miles (9.3 km; 5.8 mi) offshore, where the tow line was dropped and Commander Beck ordered six sails set (jibs, topsails, and spanker). She then sailed for 40 minutes on a south-south-east course with true wind speeds of about 12 kn (22 km/h; 14 mph), attaining a top recorded speed of 4 kn (7.4 km/h; 4.6 mph). Her modern US naval combatant escorts were the guided-missile destroyer Ramage and frigate Halyburton. They rendered passing honors to "Old Ironsides" while she was under sail, and she was overflown by the US Navy Flight Demonstration Squadron, the Blue Angels. Inbound to her permanent berth at Charlestown, she rendered a 21-gun salute to the nation off Fort Independence in Boston Harbor.

== Present day ==
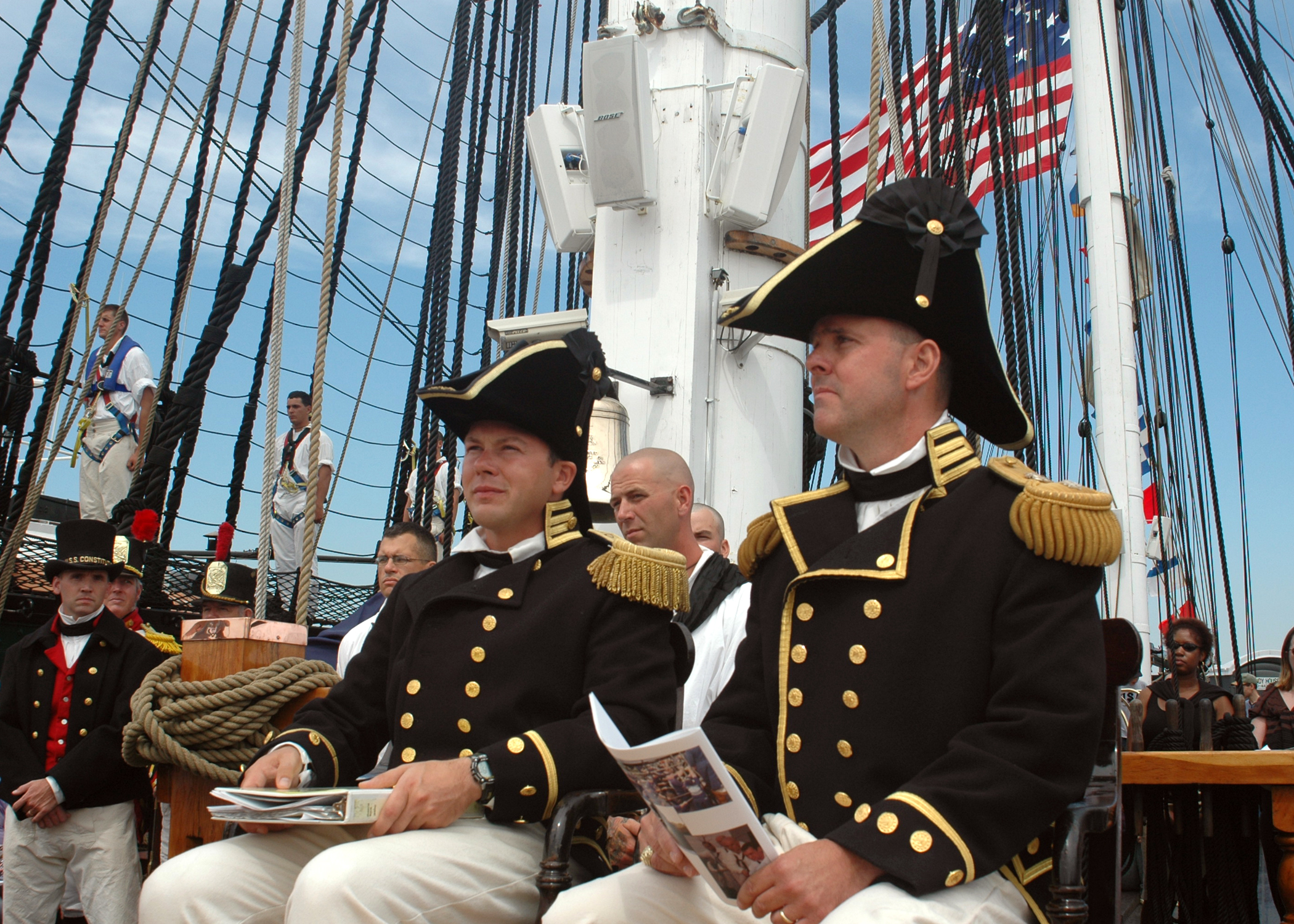
Officers and crew of USS Constitution, July 2005

The mission of Constitution is to promote understanding of the Navy's role in war and peace through active participation in public events and education through outreach programs, public access, and historic demonstration. Her crew of approximately 75 US Navy sailors participate in ceremonies, educational programs, and special events while keeping the ship open to visitors year-round and providing free tours. The crewmen are all active-duty members of the US Navy, and the assignment is considered to be special duty. She entered dry dock in May 2015 for a scheduled restoration, before returning to sea.

Constitution is berthed at Pier One of the former Charlestown Navy Yard and is open to the public year-round. She is a stop on the Freedom Trail, a path connecting historic sites in Boston; sequentially, she is between Copp's Hill Burying Ground and the Bunker Hill Monument. The privately run USS Constitution Museum is nearby, located in a restored shipyard building at the foot of Pier Two. Constitution typically makes at least one "turnaround cruise" each year, during which she is towed into Boston Harbor to perform underway demonstrations, including a gun drill; she then returns to her dock in the opposite direction to ensure that she weathers evenly. The "turnaround cruise" is open to the general public based on a "lottery draw" of interested persons each year.

The Naval History and Heritage Command Detachment Boston is responsible for planning and performing her maintenance, repair, and restoration, keeping her as close as possible to her 1812 configuration. The detachment estimates that approximately 10–15 percent of the timber in Constitution contains original material installed during her initial construction period in the years 1795–1797. The Navy maintains Constitution Grove at Naval Surface Warfare Center Crane Division near Bloomington, Indiana to ensure a supply of mature white oak. In 1997, following the Constitution's 200th-anniversary sailing excursion, former commander Tyrone G. Martin wrote of her seaworthiness:

Could the Constitution sail again? Yes—in winds of less than ten knots, in seas of a foot or less, with a half-dozen sails or so, for a brief period, close to home. Should it be done? Not unless it relates directly and clearly to her continued well-being. Diagonal riders notwithstanding, she is still a ship with a 200-year-old keel, 200-year-old floor timbers, and 200-year-old first futtocks.

In 2003, the special effects crew from the production of Master and Commander: The Far Side of the World spent several days using Constitution as a computer model for the fictional French frigate Acheron, using stem-to-stern digital image scans. Lieutenant Commander John Scivier of the Royal Navy, commanding officer of HMS Victory, paid a visit to Constitution in November 2007, touring the local facilities with Commander William A. Bullard III. They discussed arranging an exchange program between the two ships.

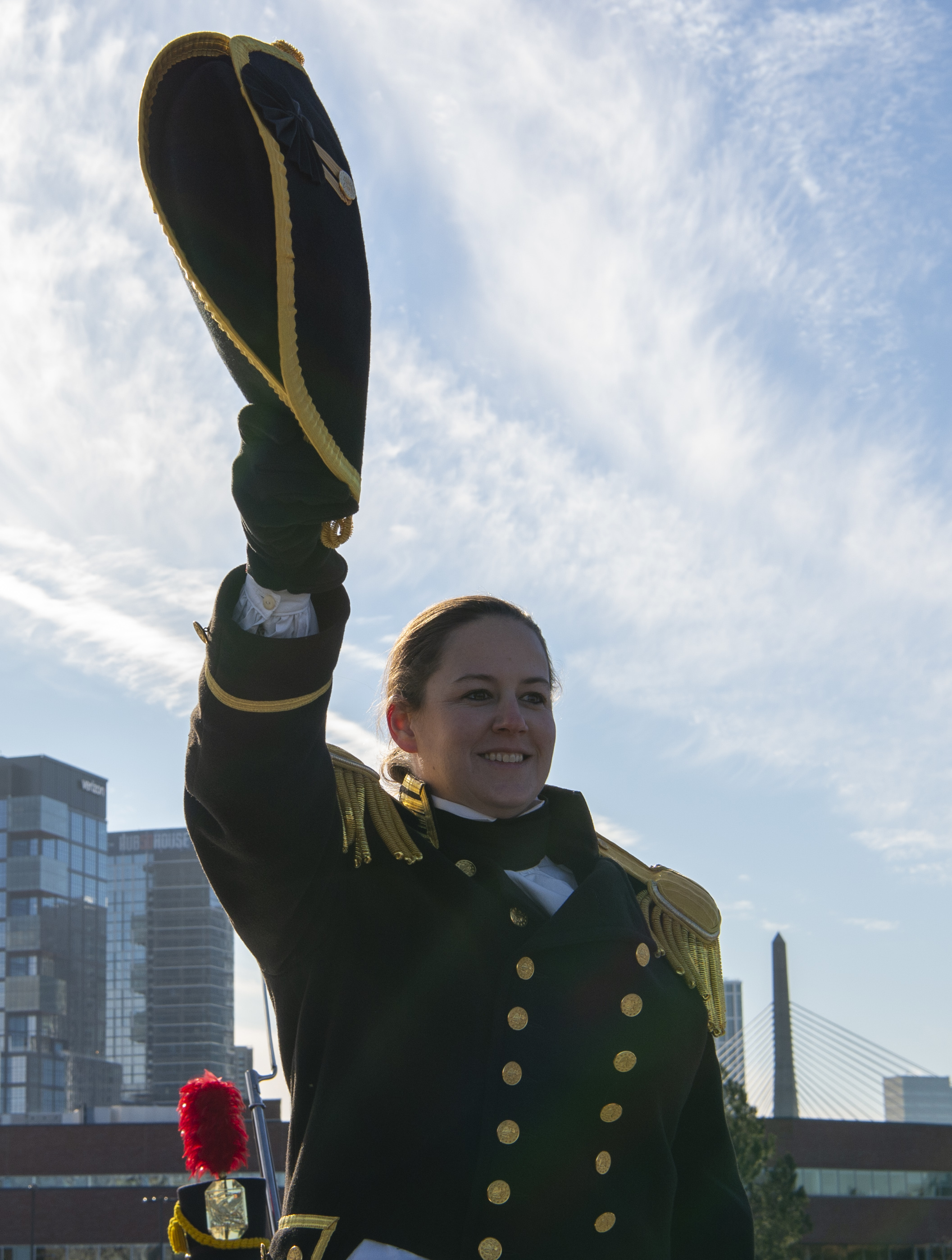
Commander Billie J. Farrell, first female captain of Constitution, seen here in January 2022

Constitution emerged from a three-year repair period in November 2010. During this time, the entire spar deck was stripped down to the support beams, and the decking overhead was replaced to restore its original curvature, allowing water to drain overboard and not remain standing on the deck. In addition to decking repairs, 50 hull planks and the main hatch were repaired or replaced. The restoration continued the focus toward keeping her appearance of 1812 by replacing her upper sides so that she now resembles what she looked like after her triumph over Guerriere, when she gained her nickname "Old Ironsides". The crew of Constitution under Commander Matt Bonner sailed Constitution under her own power on 19 August 2012, the anniversary of her victory over Guerriere. Bonner was Constitution's 72nd commanding officer.

On 18 May 2015, the ship entered Dry Dock 1 in Charlestown Navy Yard to begin a two-year restoration program. The restoration planned to restore the copper sheets on the ship's hull and replace deck boards. The Department of the Navy provided the $12–15 million expected cost. After the restoration was complete, she was returned to the water on 23 July 2017. In November 2017, Commander Nathaniel R. Shick relieved Commander Robert S. Gerosa Jr., who had spent most of his command while the ship was dry docked, in a ceremony held on board Constitution, to become the ship's 75th commanding officer.

On 29 February 2020, Shick was succeeded as commanding officer by Commander John Benda. He was replaced on 17 January 2022 by Billie J. Farrell, who became the first woman to command Constitution. Crystal L. Schaefer was promoted to commander on 21 June 2024, replacing Farrell as Constitution's second female commander.

=== Image gallery ===
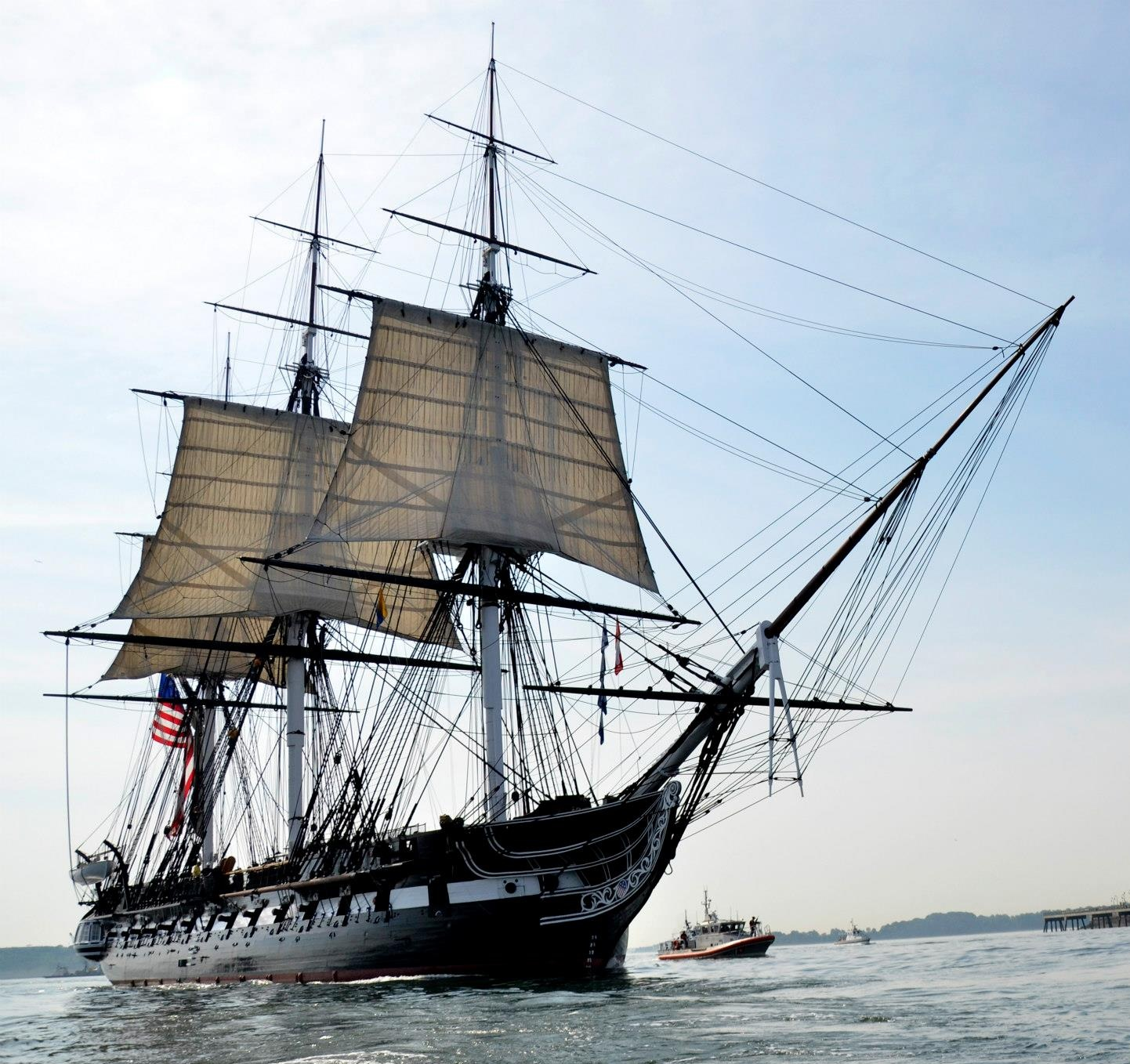
USS Constitution underway

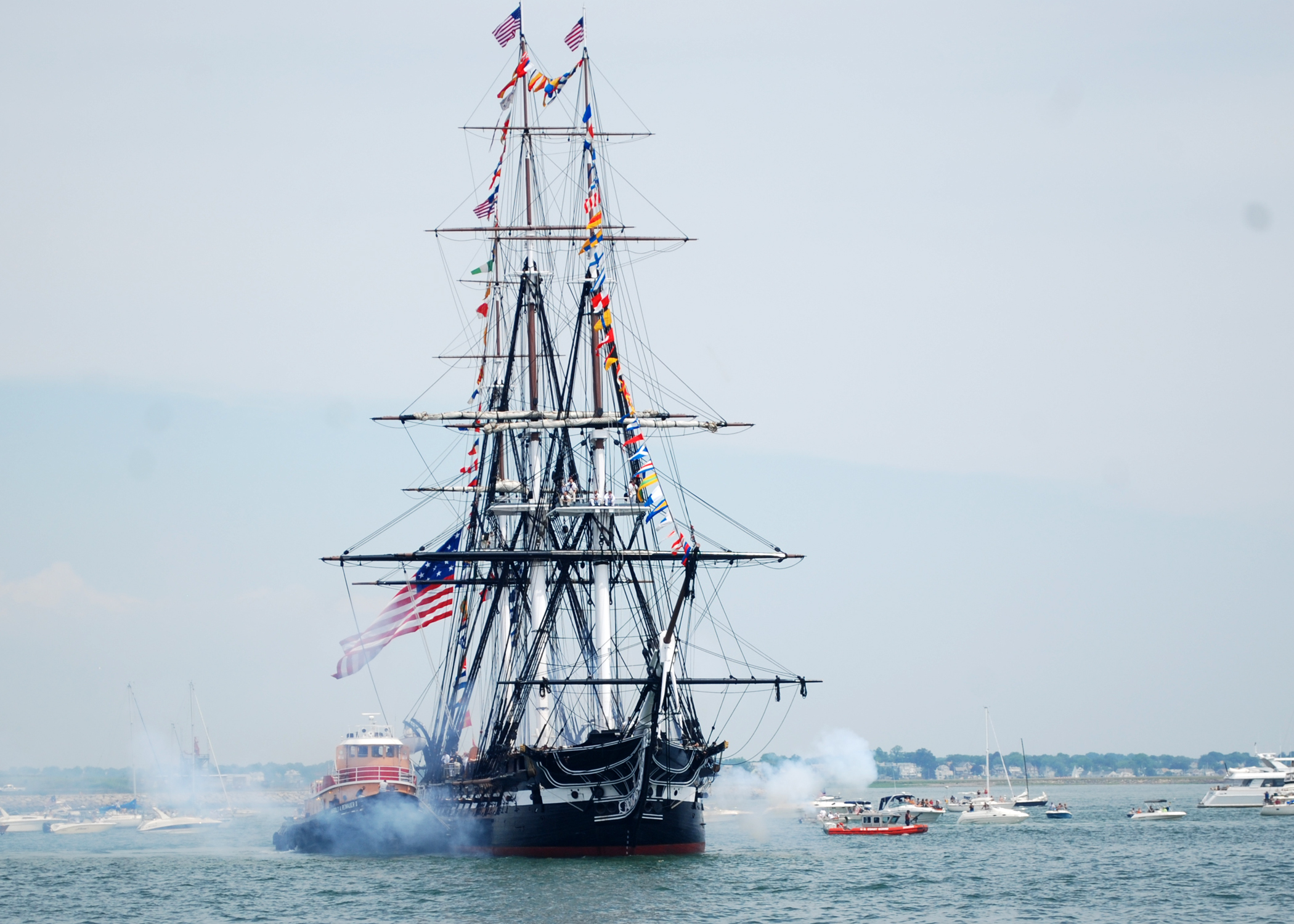
Constitution fires a 21-gun salute toward Fort Independence.

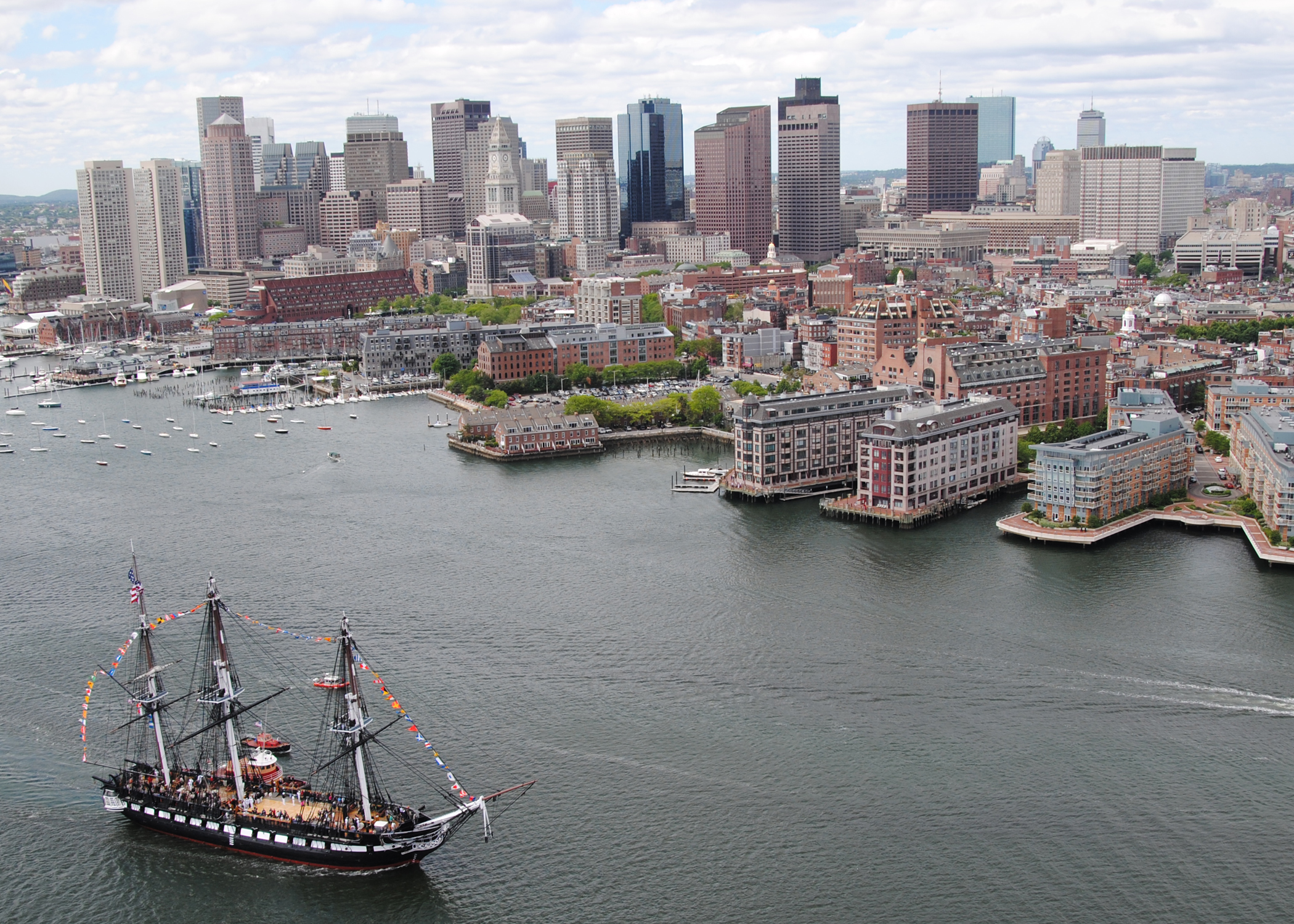
Constitution sails into Boston Harbor.

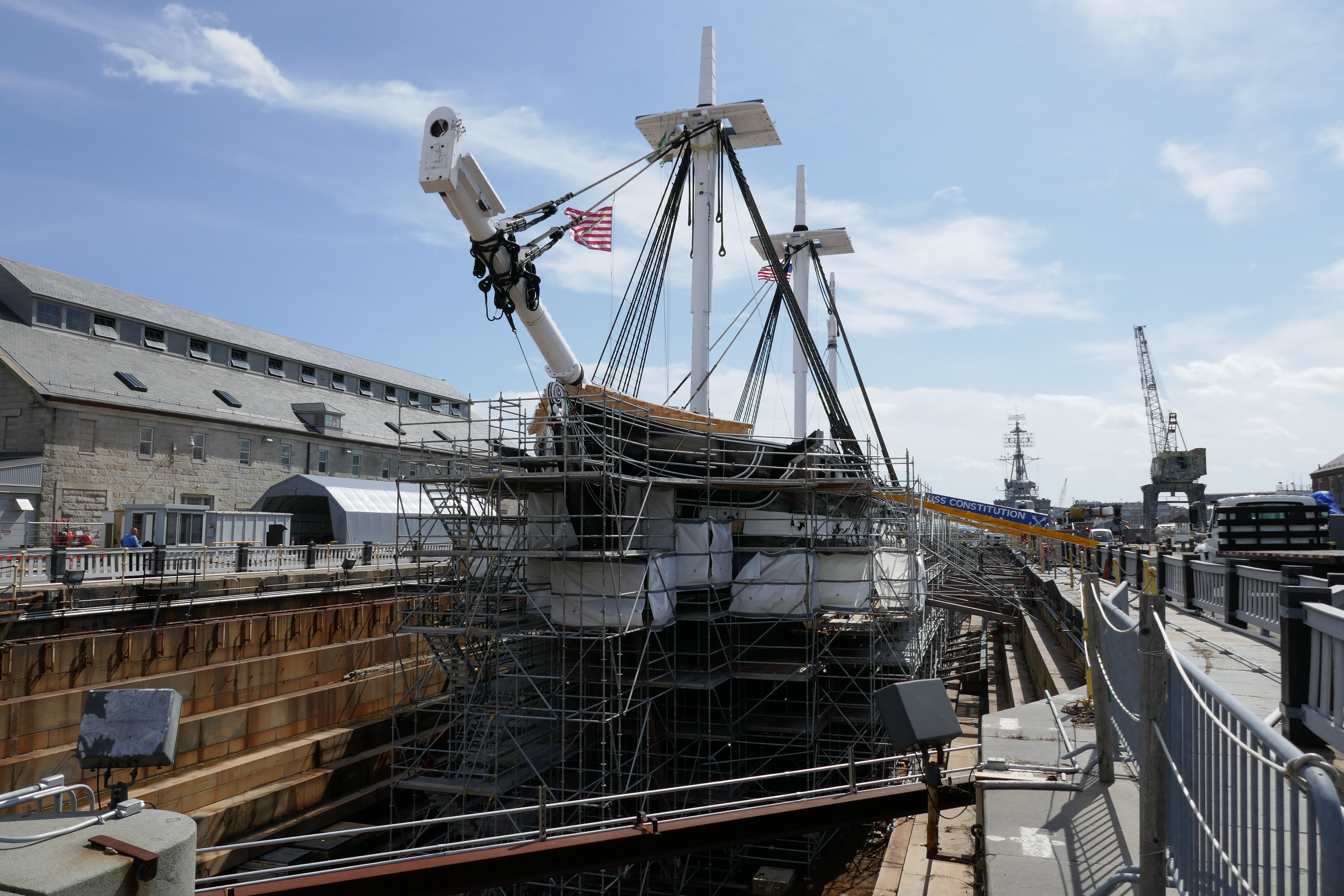
USS Constitution in dry dock for restoration work in 2016

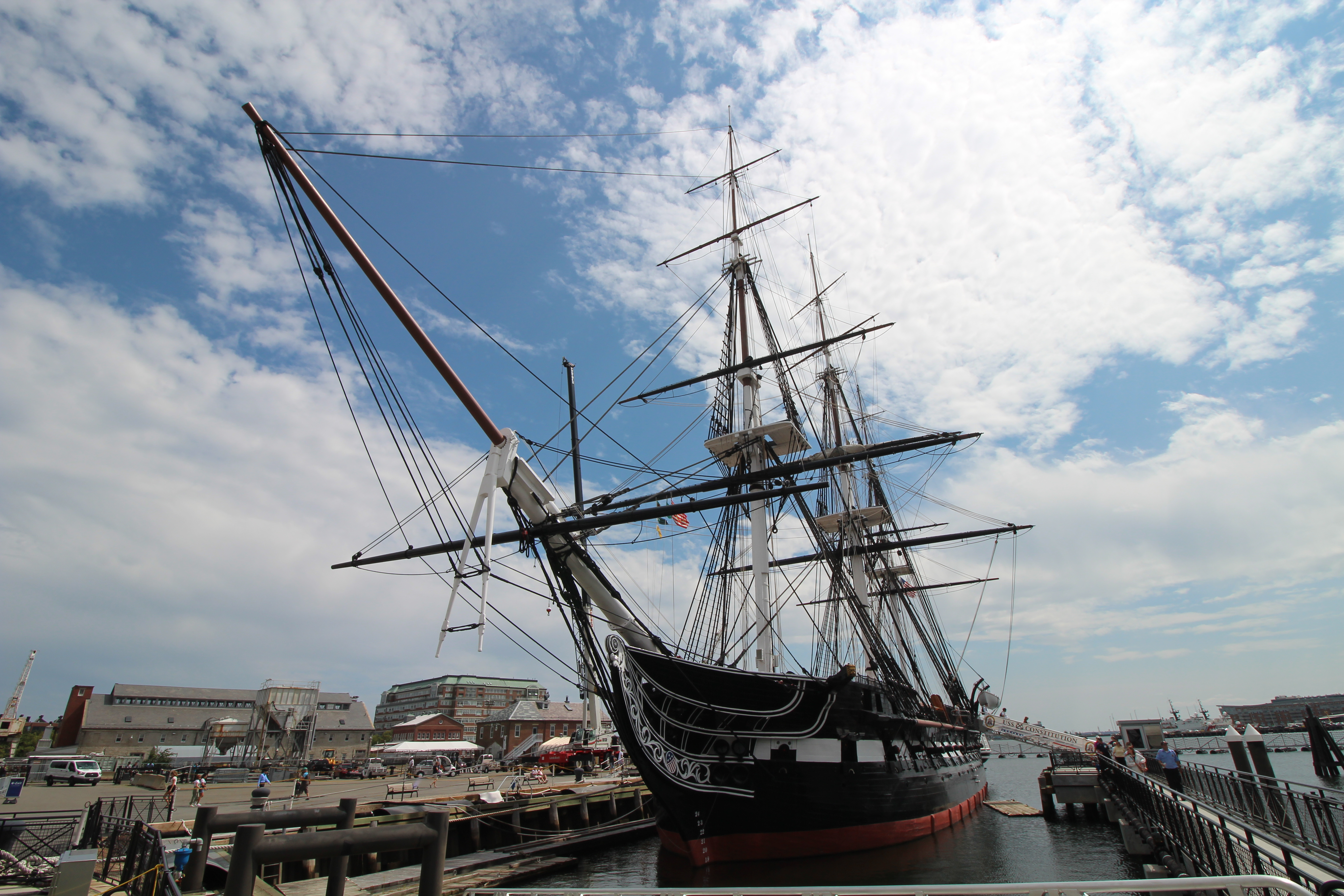
USS Constitution in dock, 2018

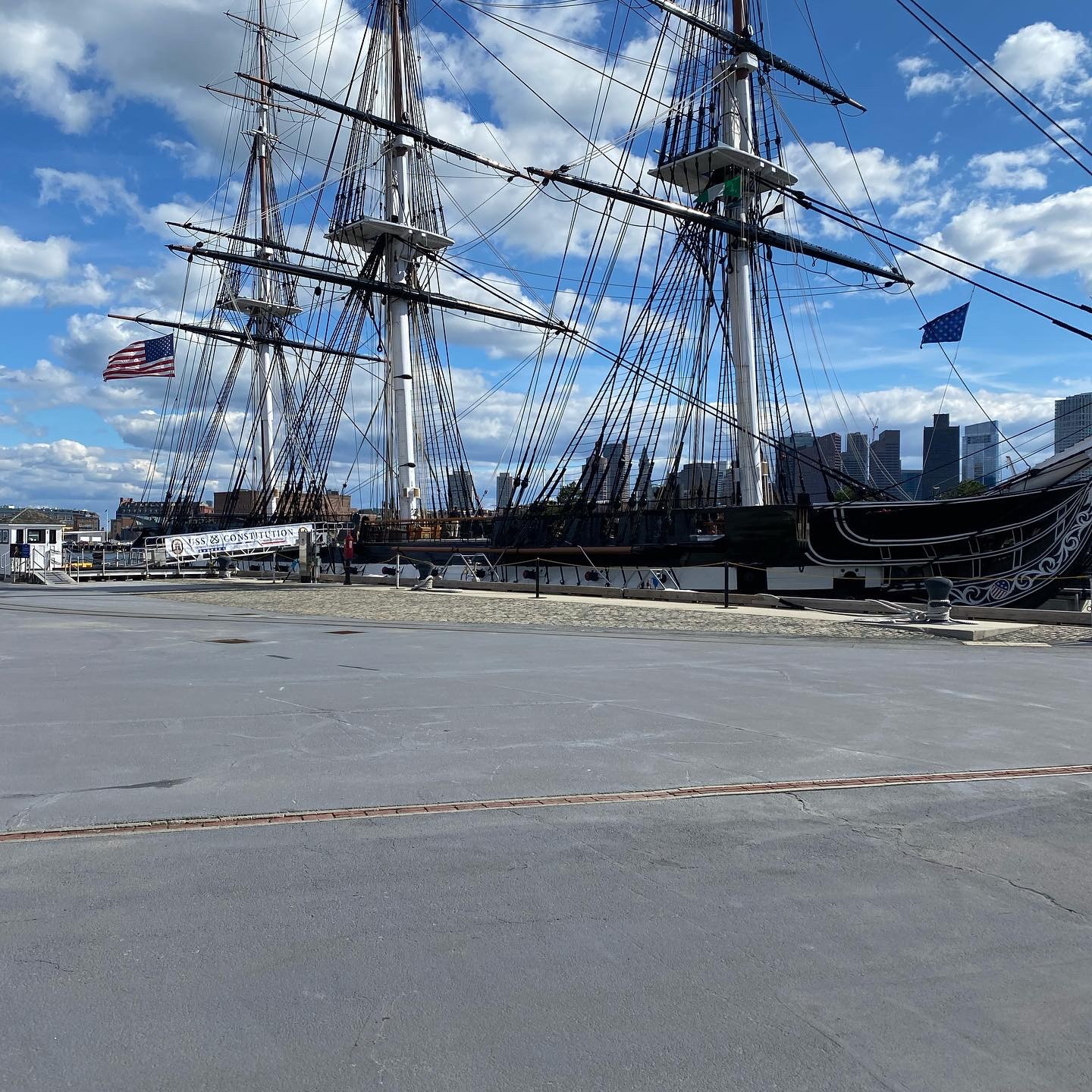
USS Constitution docked in April 2022 with the Boston skyline in the background

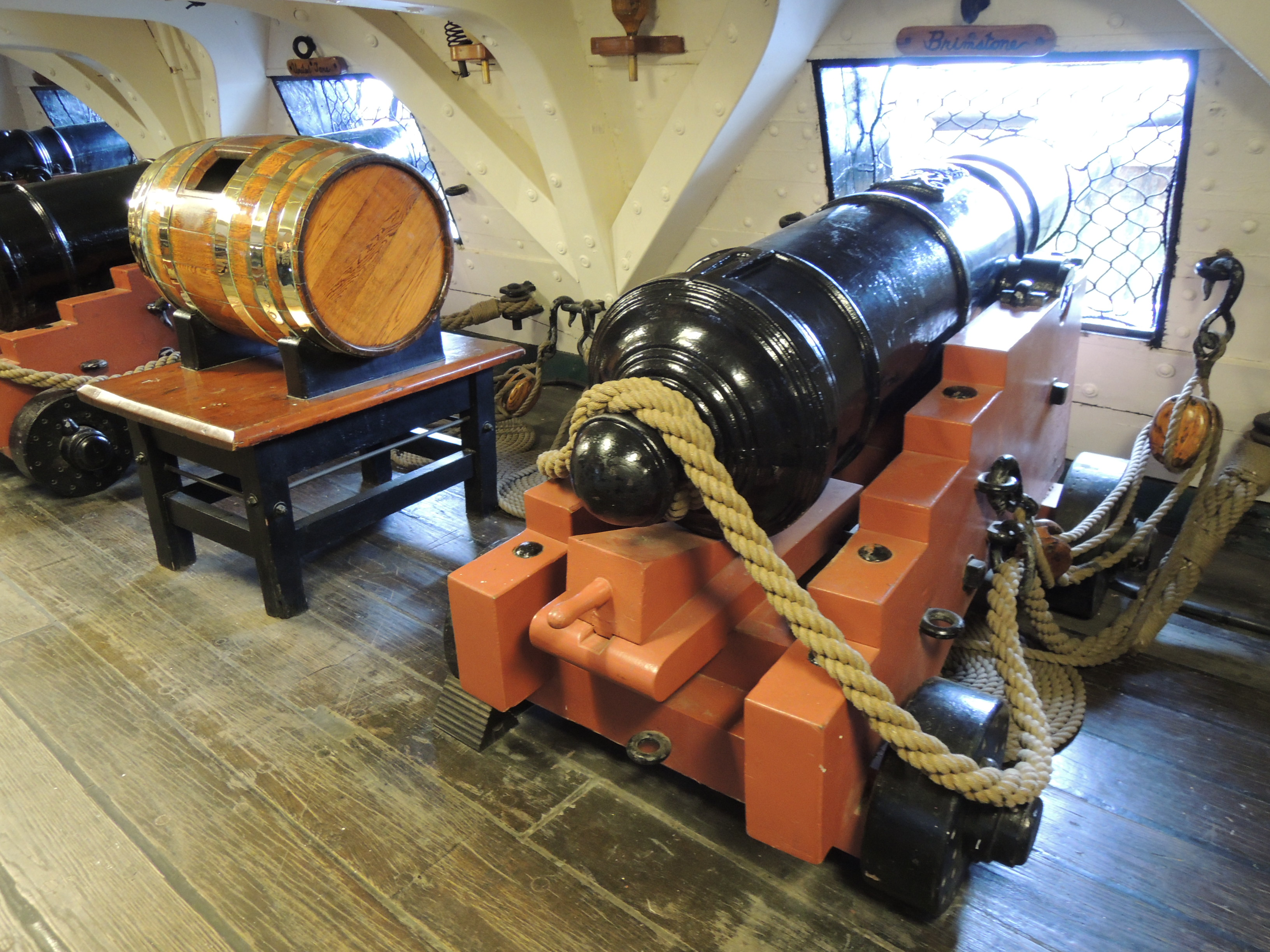
One of the cannons aboard Constitution

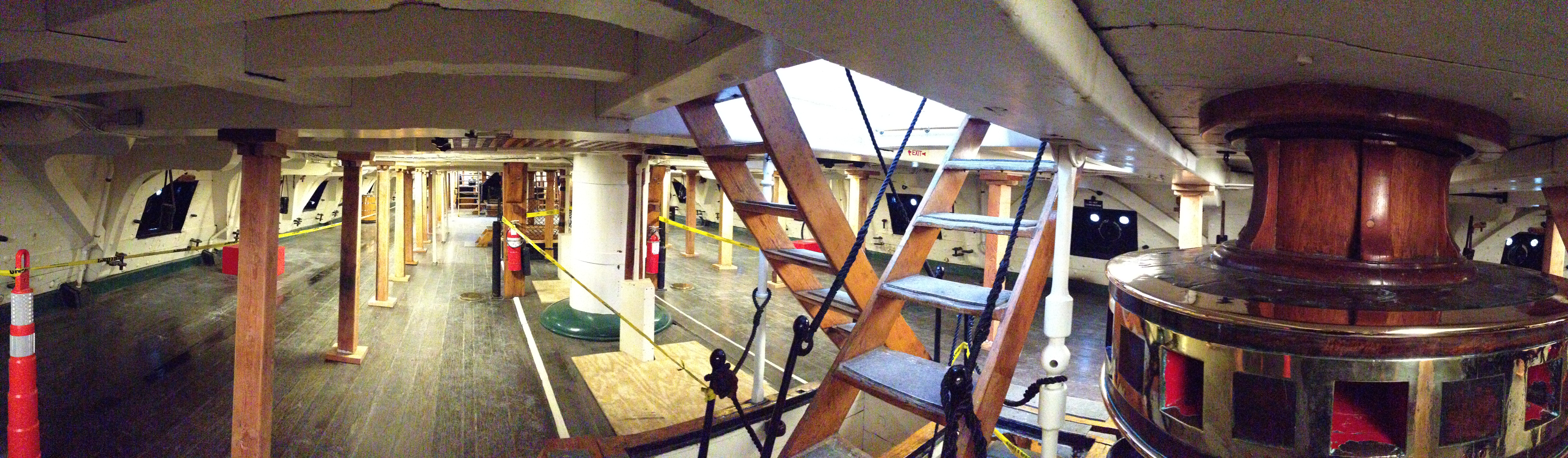
Inside USS Constitution in 2015

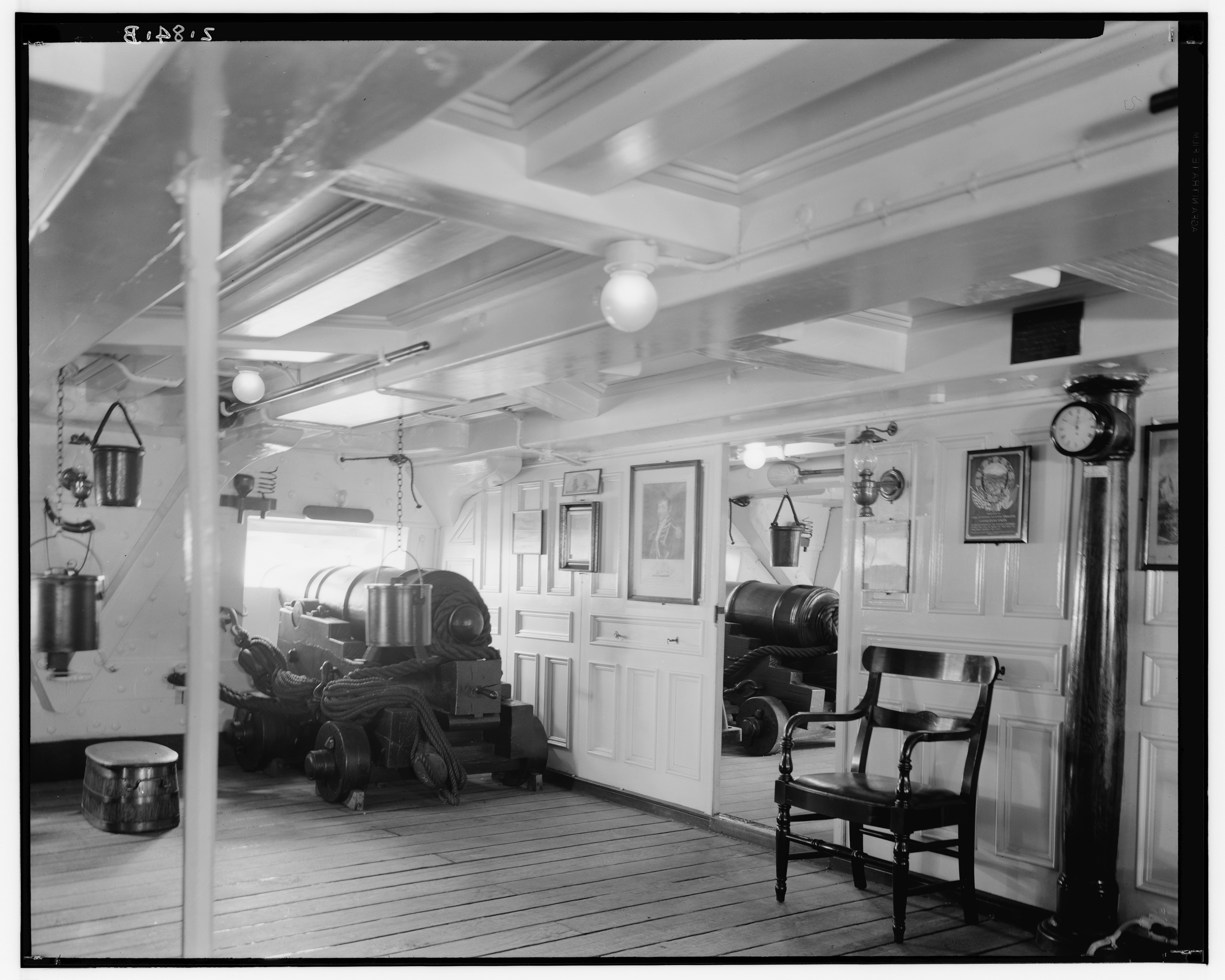
Commodore's forward cabin (historical)

== Commanders ==
Since she was first launched in 1797, there have been 79 commanders of Constitution.

Name	Rank	Start date	End date
Samuel Nicholson	Captain	22 Jul 1798	5 Jun 1799
Silas Talbot	Captain	5 Jun 1799	8 Sep 1801
Nathaniel Haraden	Sailing Master	30 Jun 1802	14 May 1803
Edward Preble	Captain	14 May 1803	28 Oct 1804
Stephen Decatur	Captain	28 Oct 1804	9 Nov 1804
John Rodgers	Captain	9 Nov 1804	30 May 1806
Hugh George Campbell	Captain	30 May 1806	8 Dec 1807
John Rodgers	Captain	20 Feb 1809	17 Jun 1810
Isaac Hull	Captain	17 Jun 1810	15 Sep 1812
William Bainbridge	Captain	15 Sep 1812	18 Jul 1813
Charles Stewart	Captain	18 Jul 1813	16 Jul 1815
Jacob Jones	Captain	1 Apr 1821	31 May 1824
Thomas Macdonough	Captain	31 May 1824	14 Oct 1825
Daniel Todd Patterson	Captain	14 Oct 1825	5 Dec 1825
George Campbell Read	Captain	23 Jan 1826	21 Feb 1826
Daniel Todd Patterson	Captain	21 Feb 1826	19 Jul 1828
Jesse Duncan Elliott	Captain	3 Mar 1835	18 Aug 1838
Daniel Turner	Captain	1 Mar 1839	8 Nov 1841
Foxhall Alexander Parker Sr.	Captain	15 Jul 1842	16 Feb 1843
John Percival	Captain	13 Dec 1843	5 Oct 1846
John Gwinn	Captain	9 Oct 1848	4 Sep 1849
James H. Rowan	Lieutenant	4 Sep 1849	18 Sep 1849
Thomas Anderson Conover	Captain	18 Sep 1849	16 Jan 1851
John Singleton Rudd	Commander	22 Dec 1852	15 Jun 1855
David Dixon Porter	Lieutenant	1 Aug 1860	22 Aug 1860
George Washington Rodgers II	Lieutenant	20 Sep 1860	23 Sep 1861
Edward Phelps Lull	Lieutenant	23 Sep 1861	15 Dec 1863
Henry Martin Blue	Lieutenant	15 Dec 1863	16 Apr 1864
Philip Carrigan Johnson Jr.	Lieutenant Commander	16 Apr 1864	16 Feb 1866
Edmund Matthews	Lieutenant Commander	16 Feb 1866	26 Feb 1866
Thomas Henderson Eastman	Lieutenant Commander	26 Feb 1866	6 Nov 1867
George Dewey	Lieutenant Commander	6 Nov 1867	1 Aug 1870
Henry Lycurgus Howison	Lieutenant Commander	1 Aug 1870	19 Sep 1871
Henry A. Adams Jr.	Captain	13 Jan 1877	15 Aug 1877
James Augustin Greer	Captain	15 Aug 1877	23 Aug 1877
Reigart Boliver Lowry	Captain	23 Aug 1877	5 Sep 1877
Augustus Paul Cooke	Commander	5 Sep 1877	9 Jan 1878
Oscar C. Badger	Captain	9 Jan 1878	2 Aug 1879
Francis H. Baker	Captain	2 Aug 1879	25 Sep 1879
Oscar Fitzalon Stanton	Captain	1 Oct 1879	14 Jun 1881
Edwin Malcolm Shepard	Commander	14 Jun 1881	14 Dec 1881
John William Powers	Lieutenant	20 May 1905	22 May 1905
Louis Joseph Gulliver	Commander	1 Jul 1931	8 Jun 1934
Hermann Pierce Knickerbocker	Lieutenant Commander	24 Aug 1940	1 Dec 1941
Clarence Earl McBride	Lieutenant	1 Dec 1941	27 Mar 1945
Owen William Huff	Lieutenant Commander	27 Mar 1945	8 Jul 1947
Harry Corrolli	Lieutenant	8 Jul 1947	1 Dec 1947
Louis Everette Wood	Chief Warrant Officer	1 Dec 1947	11 Mar 1950
Knud Haabendal Christensen	Chief Warrant Officer	11 Mar 1950	30 Apr 1952
Albert C. Messier	Lieutenant	30 Apr 1952	22 Jun 1954
Charles William Morris	Lieutenant	22 Jun 1954	25 Apr 1957
David G. O'Brien	Lieutenant Junior Grade	25 Apr 1957	31 Mar 1959
Edward Joseph Melanson Jr.	Lieutenant Junior Grade	31 Mar 1959	1 Jul 1960
Victor Bernard Stevens Jr.	Lieutenant	1 Jul 1960	29 Aug 1963
John Christopher Kelleher	Lieutenant	29 Aug 1963	28 Jun 1965
Joseph Clark Grew II	Lieutenant	28 Jun 1965	28 Apr 1967
John William Powers	Lieutenant	28 Apr 1967	27 Mar 1969
Hugh Albert Moore	Commander	27 Mar 1969	30 Oct 1970
Jack Loren Reifschneider	Commander	30 Oct 1970	20 Aug 1971
John David McKinnon	Commander	20 Aug 1971	11 Dec 1972
Thomas Coyne	Commander	11 Dec 1972	6 Aug 1974
Tyrone Gabriel Martin	Commander	6 Aug 1974	30 Jun 1978
Robert Leo Gillen	Commander	30 Jun 1978	26 Sep 1980
Herman Otto Sudholz	Commander	26 Sep 1980	22 Jun 1985
Joseph Zachariah Brown	Commander	22 Jun 1985	8 Jul 1987
David Matthew Cashman	Commander	1 Aug 1987	21 Sep 1991
Richard Bradford Amirault	Commander	21 Sep 1991	29 Jul 1995
Michael Charles Beck	Commander	29 Jul 1995	26 Jul 1997
Christopher Allan Melhuish	Commander	26 Jul 1997	30 Jul 1999
William Feeny Foster Jr.	Commander	30 Jul 1999	11 Aug 2001
Randall Allan Neal	Commander	11 Aug 2001	19 Jul 2003
Lewin C. Wright	Commander	19 Jul 2003	30 Jul 2005
Thomas C. Graves (Relieved of duty)	Commander	30 Jul 2005	10 May 2007
William A. Bullard III	Commander	10 May 2007	24 Jul 2009
Timothy M. Cooper	Commander	24 Jul 2009	22 Jul 2011
Matthew Bonner	Commander	22 Jul 2011	26 Jul 2013
Sean D. Kearns	Commander	26 Jul 2013	14 Aug 2015
Robert S. Gerosa Jr.	Commander	14 Aug 2015	3 Nov 2017
Nathaniel R. Shick	Commander	3 Nov 2017	29 Feb 2020
John A. Benda	Commander	29 Feb 2020	21 Jan 2022
Billie J. Farrell	Commander	21 Jan 2022	21 Jun 2024
Crystal L. Schaefer	Commander	21 Jun 2024	22 Oct 2026
Jon-Andrew D. Anderson	Commander	22 Oct 2026	Present

== See also ==
- Ship of Theseus, a paradox about the identity of a ship which has had its parts replaced, which has been compared to the Constitution
- List of National Historic Landmarks in Boston
- National Register of Historic Places listings in northern Boston, Massachusetts

== Bibliography ==
- Abbot, Willis J. (1896). The Naval History of the United States. Vol. 1. Peter Fenelon Collier. OCLC 3453791.
- —— (1896). The Naval History of the United States. Vol. 2. Peter Fenelon Collier. OCLC 3453791.
- Allen, Gardner Weld (1905). Our Navy and the Barbary Corsairs. Boston, New York and Chicago: Houghton Mifflin. OCLC 2618279.
- —— (1909). Our Naval War With France. Boston and New York: Houghton Mifflin. OCLC 1202325.
- "The Naval War of 1812 Illustrated". Video Produced by American Society of Marine Artists. 2012. Archived from the original on 30 June 2014.
- Beach, Edward L. (1986). The United States Navy: 200 Years. New York: H. Holt. ISBN 978-0-03-044711-2. OCLC 12104038.
- Carlson, Stephen P. (2010). Charlestown Navy Yard Historic Resource Study (PDF) (Report). Vol. 1. Division of Cultural Resources, Boston National Historical Park.
- Carpenter, Edward J. (November 1897). "Old Ironsides". The New England Magazine (Uncorrected OCR text). 23 (3): 263–282.
- Colledge, J. J.; Warlow, Ben (2006) [1969]. Ships of the Royal Navy: The Complete Record of All Fighting Ships of the Royal Navy from the 15th Century to the Present (3rd Rev ed.). London: Chatham Publishing. ISBN 978-1-86176-281-8. OCLC 67375475.
- Fitz-Enz, David G. (2004). Old Ironsides: Eagle of the Sea: The Story of the USS Constitution. Lanham: Taylor Trade Publishing. ISBN 978-1-58979-160-2. OCLC 54778453.
- Gardiner, Robert (2006). Frigates of the Napoleonic Wars. London: Chatham Publishing. ISBN 978-1-86176-292-4. OCLC 65768049.
- Hill, Frederic Stanhope (1905). Twenty-Six Historic Ships. The Knickerbocker Press. OCLC 1667284.
- Hollis, Ira N. (1900). The Frigate Constitution; The Central Figure of the Navy Under Sail. Boston, New York: Houghton Mifflin. OCLC 2350400.
- Jennings, John (1966). Tattered Ensign The Story of America's Most Famous Fighting Frigate, U.S.S. Constitution. Thomas Y. Crowell. OCLC 1291484.
- Maclay, Edgar Stanton; Smith, Roy Campbell (1898) [1893]. A History of the United States Navy, from 1775 to 1898. Vol. 1 (New ed.). New York: D. Appleton. OCLC 609036.
- —— (1898) [1893]. A History of the United States Navy, from 1775 to 1898. Vol. 2 (New ed.). New York: D. Appleton. OCLC 609036.
- Martin, Tyrone G. (1997). A Most Fortunate Ship: A Narrative History of "Old Ironsides". Naval Institute Press. ISBN 978-1-55750-588-0. OCLC 243901224.
- Roosevelt, Theodore (1883) [1882]. The Naval War of 1812 or The History of the United States Navy During the Last War with Great Britain (3rd ed.). New York: G.P. Putnam's sons. OCLC 133902576.
- Tashjian, James H. (Autumn 1975). "A Bicentennial History of the Armenian Community of Massachusetts". Armenian Review. 28 (3–111). Boston: Hairenik Association.
- Toll, Ian W (2006). Six Frigates: The Epic History of the Founding of the US Navy. New York: W. W. Norton. ISBN 978-0-393-05847-5. OCLC 70291925.
- Tracy, Nicholas (2006). Who's who in Nelson's Navy: 200 Naval Heroes. London: Chatham Publishing. ISBN 978-1-86176-244-3. OCLC 238896527.
- Winfield, Rif (2007). British Warships in the Age of Sail 1714–1792: Design, Construction, Careers and Fates. St. Paul: Seaforth / MBI. ISBN 978-1-84415-700-6. OCLC 216617748.

Preceded by Copp's Hill	Locations along Boston's Freedom Trail; USS Constitution	Succeeded by Bunker Hill Monument
