= Billie (given name) =

Unisex given name

- Gender: Unisex
- Language: English

Origin
- Meaning: Diminutive of William and its male and female variants

Other names
- Related names: Bill, Billi, Billy, Guglielmo, Guilherme, Guillaume, Guillem, Guillermo, Gwilym, Liam, Pim, Vilém, Vilhelm, Vilhelms, Vilhjálmur, Vilis, Viljo, Ville, Wilhelm, Wilhelmina, Wilkins, Will, Willa, Willem, Willemina, Willy, Wilma, William, Wim, Wiremu

Billie is a unisex given name. It is a variant spelling of Billy, an English nickname for William and its masculine and feminine variants. It has also been used as a feminine nickname for etymologically unrelated names such as Lillian. Both Billie and Billy are often also used as independent given names. The spelling Billie has recently become primarily feminine in use, while the spelling Billy is more commonly used for males.

== Usage ==
Billie has been in use as an independent name for both American girls and boys since the 19th century. The name was among the 1,000 most commonly used names for both sexes between the 1880s and the 1980s. It has been more commonly used for American girls since the early 1990s. The name has also been commonly used for girls in Australia, Belgium, Canada, France, Ireland, Netherlands, and the United Kingdom.

== Women ==
- Billie Allen (1925-2015), American actress
- Billie Anthony (1932-1991), Scottish singer
- Billie Barry (1921-2014), Irish singer, dancer and choreographer
- Billie Bennett (1874-1951), American film actress
- Billie Bird (1908-2002), American actress and comedian
- Billie Black (born c. 1994-95), British singer
- Billie Blair, American former model
- Billie Boullet (born 2005), British actress
- Billie Breaux (born 1936), American politician
- Billie Brockwell (1875-1949), American actress and scriptwriter
- Billie Burke (1884-1970), American actress
- Billie Cross, Canadian politician
- Billie Davies (born 1955), American jazz drummer and composer
- Billie Davis (born 1945), English singer
- Billie Dove (1903–1997), American actress
- Billie Eilish (born 2001), American singer-songwriter
- Billie J. Farrell (born c. 1982-83), American US Navy captain
- Billie Fleming (1914–2014), British long-distance cycling record-holder
- Billie Frechette (1907–1969), American Métis singer, waitress, convict, and lecturer known for her relationship with the bank robber John Dillinger
- Billie Fulford (1914-1987), New Zealand cricketer
- Billie Geter Thomas (1902–1962), American educator
- Billie Godfrey, English singer
- Billie Hayes (1924-2021), American television, film, and stage actress
- Billie Heller (1928-2018), American activist
- Billie Holiday (1915–1959), American jazz singer
- Billie Jean Horton (born 1933), American former country-music singer-songwriter and music promoter
- Billie Irwin (born 1942), New Zealand former netball player
- Billie-Jo Jenkins (1983-1997), English murder victim
- Billie Kay (born 1989), Australian professional wrestler
- Billie Jean King (born 1943), American professional tennis player and gender equality advocate
- Billie Letts (1938-2014), American novelist and educator
- Billie Livingston (born 1965), Canadian novelist and short story writer
- Billie Lourd (born 1992), American actress
- Billie Love (1923-2012), British actress and photographer.
- Billie Ray Martin, German singer and songwriter
- Billie Massey (born 2000), Belgian basketball player
- Billie McBride (1927-2017), American rodeo competitor
- Billie McKay (born 1991), Australian cook, known for winning the seventh and fourteenth series of MasterChef Australia
- Billie Melman, Israeli academic
- Billie Miller (born 1944), Barbadian politician
- Billie Moore (1943–2022), American basketball coach
- Billie Myers (born 1971), British rock singer and songwriter
- Billie Nipper (1929-2016), American artist
- Billie Orr, American advocate for political and education reform
- Billie Pierce (1907-1974), American jazz pianist and singer
- Billie Piper (born 1982), British singer and actress, who first recorded under the name Billie
- Billie Pitcheneder (1916–2002), Australian community worker
- Billie Poole (1929-2005), American jazz and blues singer
- Billie JD Porter (born 1992), British journalist, model and documentary filmmaker
- Billie Rhodes (1894-1988), American actress
- Billie Mae Richards (1921-2010), Canadian actress
- Billie Samuel (1907-1995), American-born Australian cyclist
- Billie Seward (1912-1982), American actress
- Billie Shepherd (born 1990), British television personality
- Billie Simpson (born 1992), Northern Irish footballer
- Billie-Jo Smith (born c. 1998), English professional golfer
- Billie Sørum (born 1948), Norwegian former curler.
- Billie Jo Spears (1937–2011), American country music singer
- Billie J. Swalla, American scientist and academic
- Billie Tapscott (1903-1970), South African female tennis player
- Billie Jean Theide (born 1956), American sculptor and goldsmith
- Billie Untermann (1906-1973), American geologist
- Billie Lou Watt (1924-2001). American actress
- Billie Whitelaw (1932-2014), British actress
- Billie Worth (1916-2016), American actress
- Billie Yorke (1910-2000), British tennis player

== Men ==
- Billie Joe Armstrong (born 1972), American singer and guitarist for the band Green Day
- Billie Dawe (1924-2013), Canadian amateur ice hockey player and Olympian
- Billie Sol Estes (1925-2013), American businessman and financier
- Billie Gillespie (1873-1942), Scottish footballer
- Billie D. Harris (1922-1944), American World War II fighter pilot
- Billie Harvey (1950-2007), American racing driver
- Billie Matthews (1930-2001), American football coach
- Billie Palmes (1884-1961), English international polo player
- Billie Ritchie (1874-1921), Scottish comedian
- Billie Smedts (born 1992), former professional Australian rules footballer
- Billie Sutton (born 1984), American former professional bronc rider and politician
- Billie "Buckwheat" Thomas (1931-1980), American child actor best remembered for portraying the character of Buckwheat in the Our Gang (Little Rascals) short films from 1934 until the series' end in 1944
- Billie Lee Turner (1925-2020), American botanist and academic and father of Billie Lee Turner II
- Billie Lee Turner II (born 1945), American geographer and human-environmental scientist and son of Billie Lee Turner
- Billie Worley, American film and television actor
