= Heckel =

Heckel is a surname. Notable people with the surname include:

- Augustin Heckel (1690–1770), German-born English painter and engraver
- Blayne Heckel (born 1953), American experimental physicist
- Catharina Sperling-Heckel (1699–1741), German painter and engraver
- David G. Heckel (born 1953), American entomologist (insects)
- Édouard Marie Heckel (1843–1916), French botanist and medical doctor
- Erich Heckel (1883–1970), German painter and print maker
- Fred E. Heckel (fl. 1900), American football coach
- Johann Adam Heckel (1812–1877), German instrument maker, inventor of the
  - Heckelphone and the
  - Heckel-clarina; founder of
  - Wilhelm Heckel GmbH, German woodwind musical instrument manufacturing company
- Johann Jakob Heckel (1790–1857), Austrian zoologist, particularly of fish (ichthyology)
- Joseph Heckel (1922–2011), French footballer
- Kayleigh Heckel (born 2006), American basketball player
- Titus Heckel (fl. since 2010), Canadian film director and screenwriter
- Vilém Heckel (1918–1970), Czech landscape photographer
- Waldemar Heckel (born 1949), German-born Canadian historian

== See also ==
- Media related to Heckel (surname) at Wikimedia Commons
