= Matlak (surname) =

Matlak is a surname. Notable people with the surname include:

- Józef Matlak (fl. 1960s), Polish luge competitor
- Marek Matlak (born 1966), Polish chess player
- Mark Matlak (born 1956), American coach of American football and baseball
- Štefan Matlák (1934–2003), Slovak footballer
- Theodore Matlak (born 1965), American politician
