= V. P. Whelan =

American football player and coach (1877–1946)

Biographical details
- Born: July 19, 1877; Youngstown, Ohio, U.S.
- Died: November 21, 1946 (aged 69); Palm Beach, Florida, U.S.

Playing career
- 1896: Mahoning Cycle Club
- 1897: Westminster (PA)
- 1898: Washington & Jefferson
- 1901: Ohio Medical
- Positions: Fullback, quarterback

Coaching career (HC unless noted)
- 1899: Allegheny (assistant)
- 1902: Allegheny

Head coaching record
- Overall: 7–3

Vincent Paul Whelan (July 19, 1877 – November 21, 1946) was an American college football player and coach. He served as the head football coach at Allegheny College in Meadville, Pennsylvania for one season, in 1902, compiling a record of 7–3.

Whelan was born on July 19, 1877, in Youngstown, Ohio, to Dr. W. J. and Elizabeth (Hewitt) Whelan. He played football for the Mahoning Cycle Club in 1896. The following year, he attended Westminster College in New Wilmington, Pennsylvania, where he played football as a fullback. He was elected captain of the Westminster football team for 1898, but transferred to Washington & Jefferson College in Washington, Pennsylvania, where he played football as a quarterback. Whelan assisted Alonzo G. Brown with coaching the Allegheny football team in 1899. He captained the Ohio Medical football team in 1901. Whelan returned to Allegheny in 1902 as football coach following the resignation of Edward N. Eisenberg.

Whelan was a member of the Phi Gamma Delta fraternity. He died on November 21, 1946, at a hospital in Palm Beach, Florida.

== Head coaching record ==
=== Football ===
Year	Team	Overall	Conference	Standing	Bowl/playoffs
Allegheny Gators (Independent) (1902)
1901	Allegheny	7–3			
Allegheny:		7–3			
Total:		7–3			
