= Wiremu =

Wiremu is a masculine given name, the Māori form of William. Notable people with the name include:

== People with given name Wiremu ==
- Aaron Wiremu Cruden (born 1989), New Zealand rugby union player
- Wiremu Doherty, New Zealand Māori educationalist and academic
- Sydney Wiremu Eru, (born 1971), New Zealand rugby league player
- Wiremu Gudgeon, New Zealand politician
- Rata Wiremu Harrison (1935–2013), New Zealand rugby league player
- Wiremu Heke (1894–1989), New Zealand rugby union player
- Hōne Wiremu Heke Pōkai (c.1807/08–1850), Maori chief and war leader
- Wiremu Hikairo (c.1780/90–1851), New Zealand tribal leader
- Hoani Wiremu Hīpango (c.1820–1865), New Zealand tribal leader
- Wiremu Hoani Taua (1862–1919), New Zealand tribal leader
- David Wiremu Houpapa (born 1981), New Zealand cricketer
- Wiremu Hukunui Manaia (?–1892), New Zealand tribal leader
- Wiremu Katene (?–1895), New Zealand politician
- Wiremu Kerei Nikora (1853–1915), member of the New Zealand Legislative Council
- Wiremu Kīngi Maketū (c.1824–1842), the first person executed in New Zealand under British rule
- Wiremu Kingi Moki Te Matakatea (?–1893), New Zealand tribal warrior and leader
- Wiremu Kīngi Te Rangitāke (c. 1790s–1882), chief of the Te Āti Awa tribe
- Wiremu Maihi Te Rangikaheke (?–1896), New Zealand tribal leader and scholar
- Hamiora Wiremu Maioha (1888–1963), New Zealand interpreter and community leader
- Wiremu Neera Te Awaitaia (c.1796–1866), New Zealand Māori chief
- Wiremu Panapa (1898–1970), New Zealand Anglican Suffragan Bishop
- Wiremu Parata (c.1830s–1906), New Zealand politician
- Wiremu Paratene (1909–2001), New Zealand professional cyclist and politician
- Wiremu Patara Te Tuhi (?–1910), New Zealand tribal leader, newspaper editor, warrior and secretary to the Māori King
- Wiremu Pere (1837–1915), New Zealand Member of Parliament
- Sir Māui Wiremu Piti Naera Pōmare (1875/76–1930), New Zealand doctor and politician
- Wiremu Piti Pomare (?–1851), New Zealand Māori leader
- Tahupōtiki Wiremu Rātana (1873–1939), founder of the Rātana religion
- Winston Wiremu Reid (born 1988), New Zealand professional footballer
- Wiremu Rikihana (1851–1933), New Zealand tribal leader and politician
- Sir Mark Wiremu Solomon (born c.1954), Māori tribal leader
- Wiremu Tako Ngātata (1815–1887), New Zealand politician and Te Āti Awa leader
- Wiremu Tamihana (~1805–1866), leader of the Ngāti Hauā iwi
- Henare Wiremu Taratoa (c.1830–1864), New Zealand tribal missionary, teacher and war leader
- Wiremu Te Awhitu (1914–1994), the first Māori to be ordained a Roman Catholic priest
- Wiremu Te Kāhui Kararehe (1846–1904), New Zealand tribal leader and historian
- Wiremu Te Koti Te Rato (1820–1895), New Zealand Wesleyan minister
- Wiremu Te Ranga Poutapu (1905–1975), New Zealand master carver and carpenter
- Wiremu Te Tau Huata (1917–1991), New Zealand Anglican priest and military chaplain
- Wiremu Te Wheoro (1826–1895), member of the New Zealand House of Representatives
- Wiremu Teihoka Parata (c.1879–1949), New Zealand rugby union administrator
- Hore Wiremu Waaka (c.1938–2014), New Zealand musical entertainer
- Wiremu Whareaitu (1912−1973), New Zealand swimmer

== Fictional characters named Wiremu ==
- Wiremu Johnson, a character in the New Zealand radio soap opera You Me Now
- Wiremu Potae, a character in the New Zealand soap opera Shortland Street

== See also ==
- William (name)
