= Vilémovice (Havlíčkův Brod District) =

- Municipality
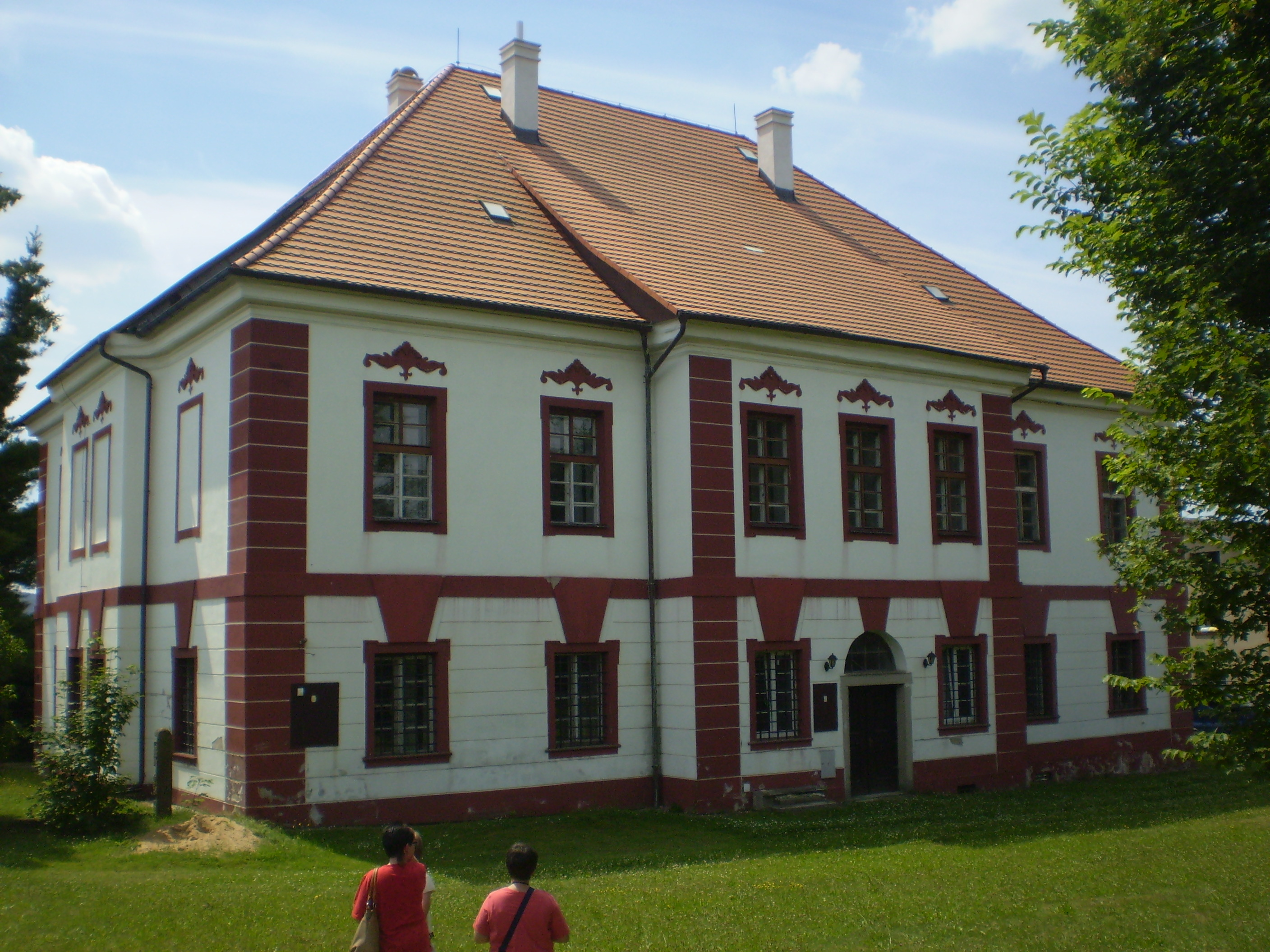
- Vilémovice Castle

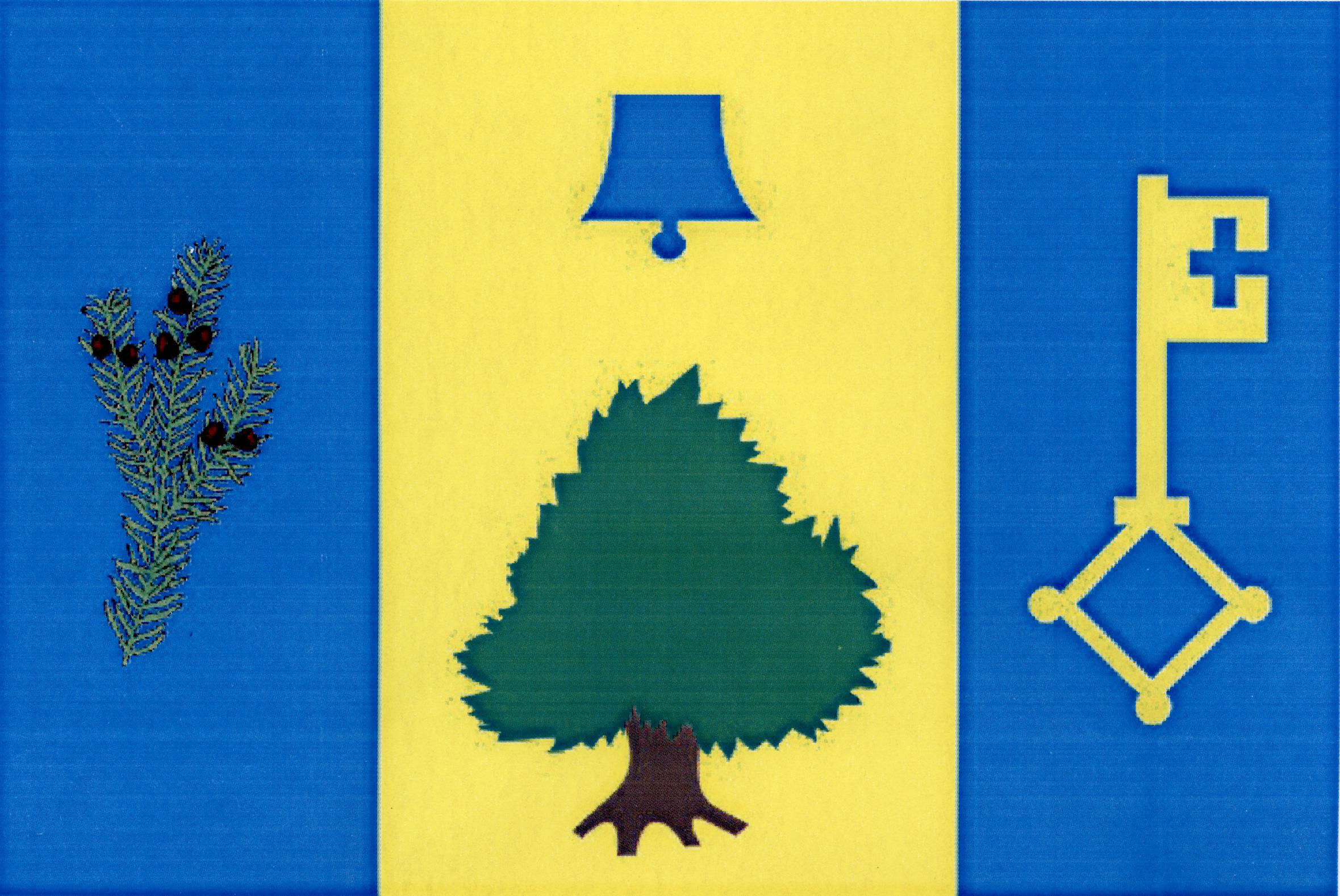
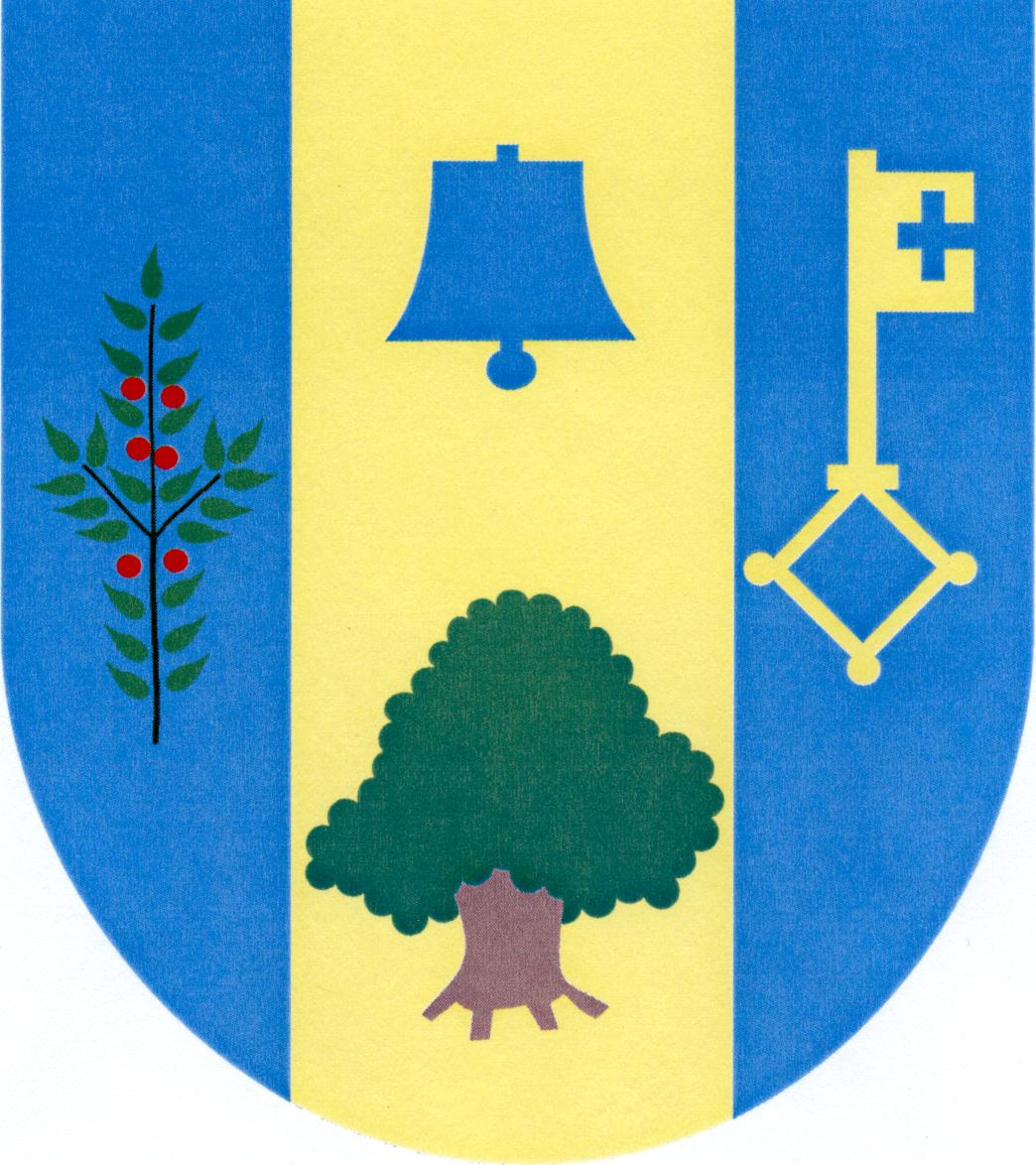
- Flag Coat of arms

- Location in the Czech Republic
- Coordinates: 49°41′11″N 15°19′19″E
- Country: Czech Republic
- Region: Vysočina
- District: Havlíčkův Brod
- First mentioned: 1390

Area
  - Total: 3.85 km^{2} (1.49 sq mi)
- Elevation: 430 m (1,410 ft)

Population (2026-01-01)
  - Total: 268
  - Density: 69.6/km^{2} (180/sq mi)
- Time zone: UTC+1 (CET)
  - Summer (DST): UTC+2 (CEST)
- Postal code: 584 01
- Website: www.obec-vilemovice.cz

Vilémovice (German: Wilimowitz) is a municipality and village in Havlíčkův Brod District in the Vysočina Region of the Czech Republic. It has about 300 inhabitants.

== Etymology ==
The name is derived from the personal name Vilém, meaning "the village of Vilém's people".

== Geography ==
Vilémovice is located about 20 kilometres (12 mi) northwest of Havlíčkův Brod and 36 km (22 mi) and northwest of Jihlava. It lies in the Upper Sázava Hills. The highest point is at 510 m (1,673 ft) above sea level. The municipality is situated on the right bank of the Sázava River, which forms the western municipal border.

== History ==
The first written mention of Vilémovice is from 1390.

== Demographics ==
Historical population

Year	Pop.	±%
1869	363	—
1880	391	+7.7%
1890	327	−16.4%
1900	303	−7.3%
1910	274	−9.6%

Year	Pop.	±%
1921	274	+0.0%
1930	253	−7.7%
1950	178	−29.6%
1961	204	+14.6%
1970	185	−9.3%

Year	Pop.	±%
1980	204	+10.3%
1991	204	+0.0%
2001	205	+0.5%
2011	214	+4.4%
2021	256	+19.6%

Source: Censuses

== Transport ==
Vilémovice is located on the railway line Havlíčkův Brod–Ledeč nad Sázavou.

== Sights ==
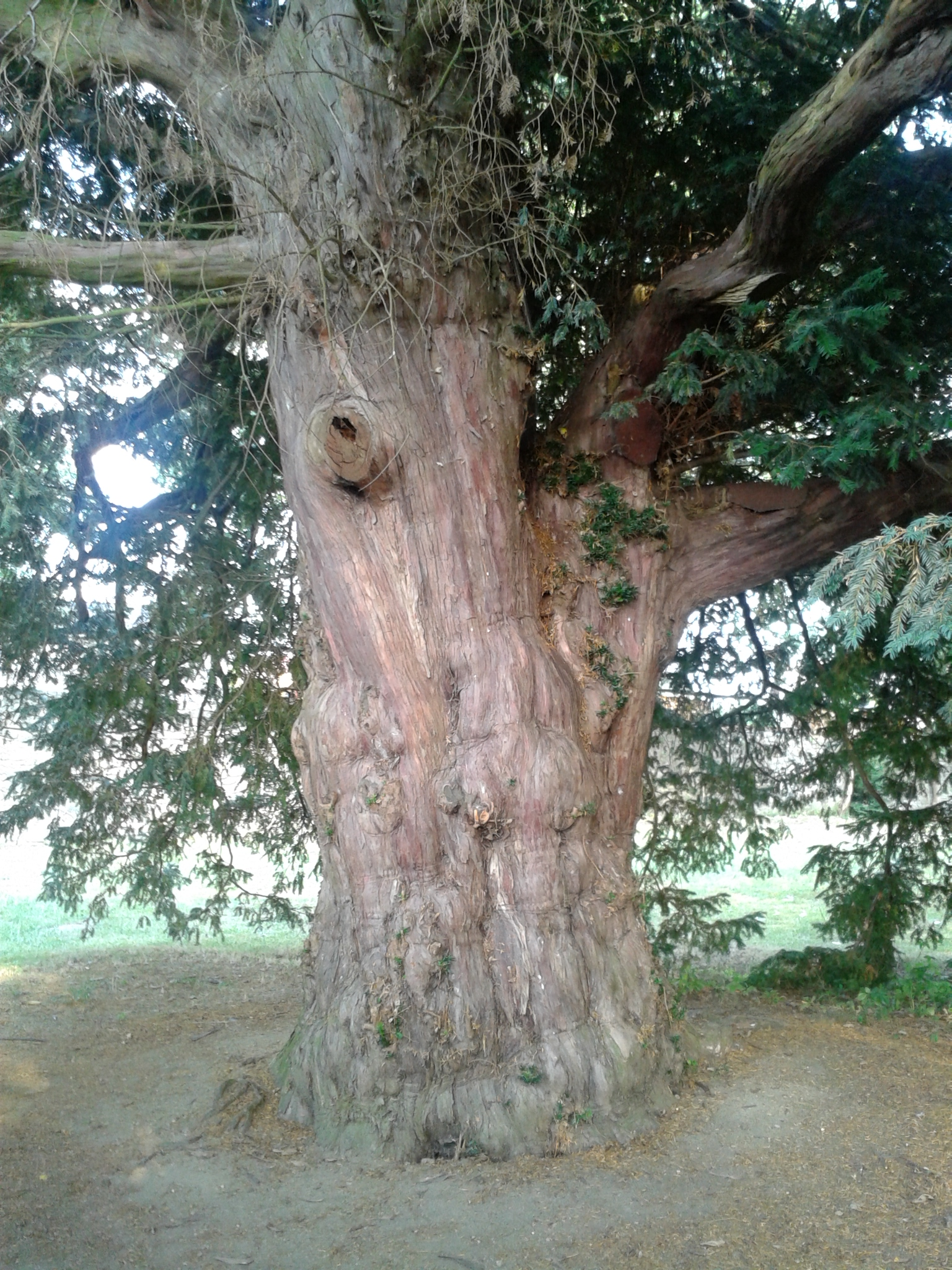
Vilémovice Yew

The main landmark is the Vilémovice Castle. It is a small rural castle built in the Baroque style in 1734–1746 and later rebuilt in the Neoclassical style.

In the castle park is located the Vilémovice Yew. This yew is the oldest tree in the Czech Republic with an estimated age of 1,500–2,000 years. It has a circumference of 345 cm (136 in).
