= Vilhjálmur Árnason =

Vilhjálmur Árnason may refer to:

- Vilhjálmur Árnason (professor) (born 1953), Icelandic philosopher and academic
- Vilhjálmur Árnason (politician) (born 1983), Icelandic politician
