= Captain (United States O-6) =

Rank in the United States uniformed services, O-6

- The insignia, shoulder boards, and sleeve stripes of a U.S. Navy captain
- Country: United States of America
- Service branch: United States Navy; United States Coast Guard; United States Public Health Service Commissioned Corps; NOAA Commissioned Officer Corps; US Maritime Service
- Abbreviation: CAPT
- Rank group: Senior officer
- NATO rank code: OF-5
- Non-NATO rank: O-6
- Next higher rank: Rear admiral (lower half)
- Next lower rank: Commander
- Equivalent ranks: Colonel (United States Army, Marine Corps, Space Force and Air Force)

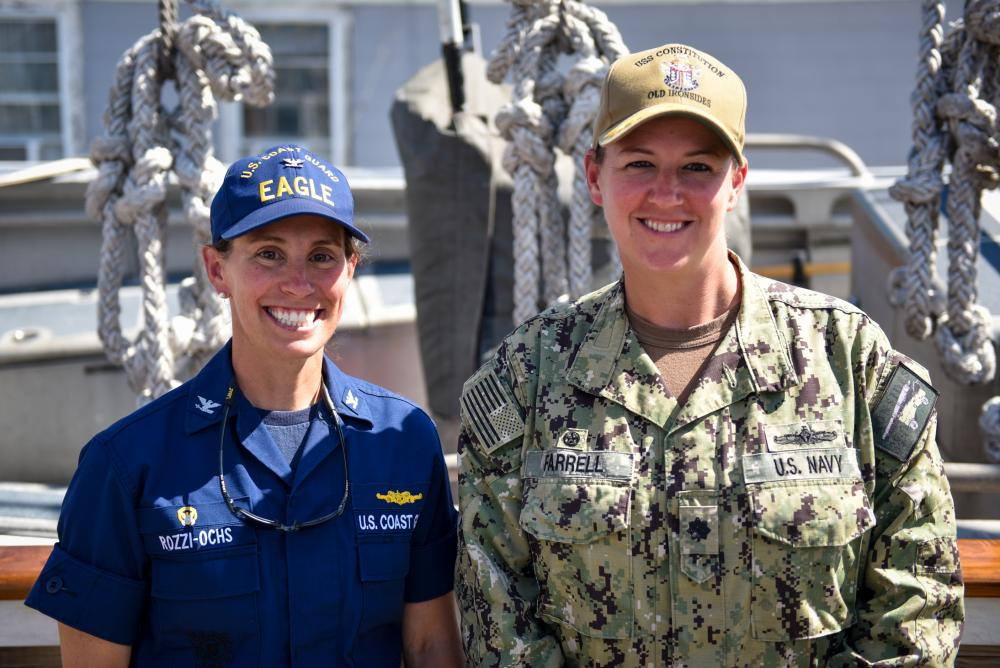
U.S. Coast Guard Captain Jessica Rozzi-Ochs of USCGC Eagle, left, and U.S. Navy Commander Billie J. Farrell of USS Constitution, right, were the first female commanding officers of their respective ships

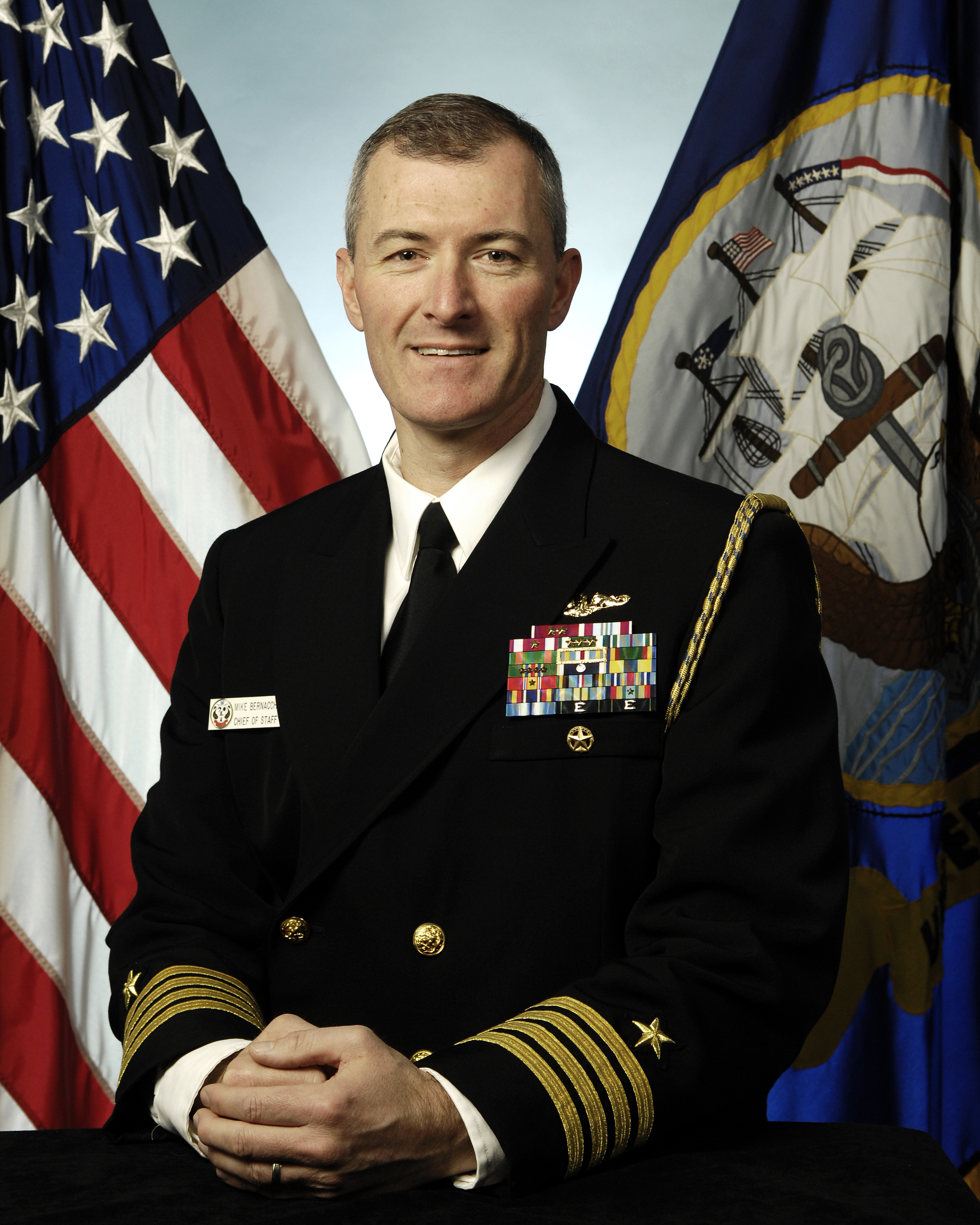
Navy submarine captain Michael Bernacchi, serving as a chief of staff to a flag officer

In the United States Navy, United States Coast Guard, United States Public Health Service Commissioned Corps (USPHS Corps), and National Oceanic and Atmospheric Administration Commissioned Officer Corps (NOAA Corps), captain is the senior-most commissioned officer rank below that of flag officer (i.e., admirals). The equivalent rank is colonel in the United States Army, Air Force, Space Force, and Marine Corps.

Reflecting its nautical heritage, the term captain is used as a military title by officers of more junior rank who command a commissioned vessel of the Navy, Coast Guard, or National Oceanic and Atmospheric Administration (NOAA) of patrol boat size or greater. Officers below O-6 who command aviation squadrons (typically O-5 commanders) usually use the less formal title "skipper".

== Insignia ==
USN, USCG, USPHSCC, and NOAACOC collar, cover (hat), or shoulder rank insignia (on select uniforms)

The eagle, shoulder boards, and dress blue sleeve stripes of a U.S. Navy captain
(Line officer)

The eagle, shoulder boards, and dress blue sleeve stripes of a U.S. Coast Guard captain

The eagle, shoulder boards, and sleeve stripes (dress blues + female dress whites) of a USPHS captain

The eagle, shoulder boards, and sleeve stripes (dress blues + female dress whites) of a NOAA Corps captain

== U.S. Navy ==
In the United States Navy, captain was the highest rank from 1775 until 1857, when the United States Congress created the rank of flag officer. The modern rank of captain (abbreviated CAPT) is a senior officer rank, with the pay grade of O-6. It ranks above commander and below rear admiral (lower half). It is equivalent to the rank of colonel in the other uniformed services. Promotion to captain is governed by Department of Defense policies derived from the Defense Officer Personnel Management Act (DOPMA) of 1980 or its companion Reserve Officer Personnel Management Act (ROPMA). DOPMA/ROPMA guidelines suggest that no more than 50% of eligible commanders should be promoted to captain after serving a minimum of three years at their present rank and after attaining 21–23 years of cumulative commissioned service, although this percentage may be appreciably less, contingent on force structure and the needs of the service. With very few exceptions, such as Naval Aviator Astronaut and Naval Flight Officer Astronaut, unrestricted line officer captains in the Navy will have successfully completed at least one commanding officer assignment at the commander (O-5) level, typically a destroyer or frigate for surface warfare officers, a nuclear-powered attack submarine or ballistic missile submarine for submarine warfare officers, a SEAL team for special warfare officers, or an aviation squadron for Naval Aviators and Naval Flight Officers, or a Construction Battalion or Public Works Officer for Civil Engineer Corps Officers, before being selected for promotion to captain. All those selected to the rank of captain by the U.S. Navy are confirmed by the United States Senate.

Navy captains with sea commands in the surface warfare officer community generally command ships of cruiser size or larger; the larger the ship, the more senior the commanding officer. Others may hold command as commodores of destroyer squadrons (DESRON) or surface squadrons (SURFRONs) consisting of multiple destroyers and frigates. Surface Warfare Officers may also command large deck amphibious warfare ships or combat support ships, or serve as commodores of amphibious squadrons (PHIBRON) or other type of surface ship squadrons.

In the submarine community, a captain typically commanded a nuclear-powered ballistic missile submarine (SSBN) until the early 21st century, when the requisite rank for the position was downgraded to commander. Today, like their surface warfare counterparts, captains in the submarine community may serve as commodores of submarine squadrons (SUBRON), commanding a group of SSBNs or attack submarines (SSN).

In Naval Aviation, captains with sea commands are Naval Aviators or Naval Flight Officers who are commanding officers of aircraft carriers, commanding officers of large-deck air-capable amphibious assault ships, commanders of carrier air wings (CAG), or commodores of functional or "type" air wings or air groups. A smaller cohort outside of sea and shore commands may also serve as astronauts on loan to the National Aeronautics and Space Administration (NASA).

In the Naval Special Warfare "Sea Air Land" (SEAL) community, captains with sea commands are typically commodores in command of Naval Special Warfare Groups (NAVSPECWARGRU).

In contrast, commanders of aircraft carrier strike groups (CSG) and expeditionary strike groups (ESG) are normally rear admirals, while subordinate destroyer squadron commodores, amphibious squadron commodores, carrier air wing commanders and the individual ship commanding officers within the strike group are of captain rank or lower. In addition, in the expeditionary strike group, the Marine Expeditionary Unit (MEU) commanding officer will always be a Marine Corps colonel. Adding to the confusion, all commanding officers of commissioned U.S. Navy warships and submarines (e.g., USS or "United States Ship") are called "captain" regardless of actual rank.

Navy captains who are line officers may also fill senior command and staff positions ashore as Chiefs of Staff/Executive Assistants or senior operations officers to flag officers, or they may hold shore command assignments such as commanding officers of naval bases, naval stations, naval air stations, naval air facilities, naval support activities, logistics groups, specialized centers or schools, or commanders of test wings or training air wings. They may also occupy senior leadership positions on fleet staffs, naval component commands staffs, the staffs of the joint Unified Combatant Commands, the staff of the Chief of Naval Operations (OPNAV), or the Joint Staff.

As opposed to unrestricted line captains, restricted line and staff corps captains will command facilities and organizations appropriate to their designators, such as intelligence centers commanded by intelligence officers; naval aviation depots/fleet readiness centers commanded by aeronautical engineering duty officers; naval hospitals commanded by Medical Corps (MC), Dental Corps (DC), Medical Service Corps (MSC), or Nurse Corps (NC) officers; supply centers by Supply Corps (SC) officers; Construction Battalions or civil engineering centers by Civil Engineer Corps (CEC) officers; or region legal service offices, trial service offices, or defense service offices commanded by Judge Advocate General's Corps (JAGC) officers.

== U.S. Coast Guard ==
The United States Coast Guard also uses the same naval rank system for its commissioned officers as the U.S. Navy, with a Coast Guard captain ranking above a commander and below rear admiral (lower half). The sleeve and shoulder board insignia are similar to the Navy insignia, with a lighter shade of blue with a gold USCG shield above the stripes. Coast Guard captains follow career paths very similar to their Navy counterparts, with marine safety, security, and boat forces officers serving as Captain of the Port in command of Coast Guard Sectors, seagoing officers typically commanding large maritime security cutters or high endurance cutters and aviators commanding Coast Guard air stations. Coast Guard captains will also command all types of major Coast Guard shore installations and activities, as well as serve as chiefs of staff / executive assistants, senior operations officers, and other senior staff officers for Coast Guard flag officers. The Coast Guard has no staff corps officers.

Like the U.S. Navy, all commanding officers of commissioned cutters (e.g., USCGC or "United States Coast Guard Cutter") are addressed as "captain" regardless of their actual rank.

== U.S. Public Health Service Commissioned Corps and NOAA Corps ==
In the United States Public Health Service (USPHS) Commissioned Corps and the National Oceanic and Atmospheric Administration Commissioned Officer Corps (NOAA Corps), captains are senior non-combatant officers that serve as directors or ranking supervisors in their respective uniformed services. Seagoing NOAA Corps captains command certain National Oceanic and Atmospheric Administration (NOAA) ships, while NOAA Corps aviators command NOAA flight operations activities. USPHS rapid-deployment force teams, containing 105 USPHS physicians, nurses, and other medical professionals, are commanded exclusively by USPHS Commissioned Corps captains.

== U.S. Maritime Service ==
Although it exists largely as a maritime training organization, the United States Maritime Service also uses the rank of captain. Even though the Maritime Service is an auxiliary service, the grade is appointed by the President via the Secretary of Transportation, making it a federally recognized rank with corresponding pay grade of O-6.

== See also ==
- Captain (United States)
- Captain (Royal Navy)
