= Nelson Illingworth =

British born Australian sculptor

Nelson William Illingworth (August 1862 – 26 June 1926) was an English sculptor and colourful bohemian.

Illingworth was born in Portsmouth, England, son of Thomas Illingworth, plasterer, and his wife Sarah, née Harvey. He studied at the Lambeth art school and emigrated to Australia in 1892.

He made busts of Australia's first Prime Minister Sir Edmund Barton and 'Father of Federation' Sir Henry Parkes.

He also went to New Zealand and completed a bust of former New Zealand prime minister, R. J. Seddon, in 1908, and then accepted a commission from Augustus Hamilton and the New Zealand government to complete ten portrait busts of Māori chiefs. Hamilton and Illingworth travelled to different parts of New Zealand to secure sittings of four prominent Māori male subjects, Te Wharekauri, Pātara Te Tuhi, Tikitere Te-Kata-a-Hikawera and Kahotea Hepi te Heuheu, and three female subjects, Neta Kākā, Harata Te Kiore and Wikitoria Keepa Tautoko.

After Illingworth completed plaster sculptures of all seven of these Māori people, he completed an eighth sculpture of Tupai in November 1909, which is a depiction of Tūpai-whakarongo-wānanga, an important Māori ancestor. Illingworth did not complete the final two sculptures of the commission; the eight sculptures from this commission are in the taonga Māori collection at the Museum of New Zealand Te Papa Tongarewa. While creating the sculptures, Illingworth was promoted by the natives of a tribe as a chief of that Maori tribe. At Papawai pa, New Zealand, he erected a monument in 1911, to the memory of Hamuera Tamahau Mahupuku, a distinguished chief of Ngati-Kahungunu.

Illingworth was one of the seven 'heptarchs' of the Dawn and Dusk Club of which Australian writer Henry Lawson and other notable Sydney bohemians were members around 1898. There is speculation that Hannah Thorburn, loved by Lawson, was one of his models and that Lawson met her through him. It was Illingworth who made the death mask of Lawson which is in the Mitchell Library, Sydney (though there is still debate whether the mask was made in the writer's life or death). Illingworth was also something of a composer.

Illingworth died on 26 June 1926 in the Sydney suburb of Harbord. He is buried in Northern Suburbs (Sydney) cemetery.
