= Vilhjálmur =

Vilhjálmur [ˈvɪlˌçaulmʏr̥] or Vilhjalmur is an Icelandic masculine given name and may refer to:

- Vilhjálmur Árnason (politician) (born 1983), Icelandic politician
- Vilhjálmur Árnason (professor) (born 1953), professor of philosophy at the University of Iceland
- Vilhjálmur Þórmundur Vilhjálmsson (born 1946), mayor of Reykjavík 2006–2007
- Vilhjálmur Einarsson (1934–2019), former Icelandic athlete, and triple-jump Olympic silver medalist
- Vilhjálmur Hjálmarsson (1914–2014), Icelandic politician
- Vilhjalmur Stefansson (1879–1962), Canadian Arctic explorer and ethnologist
- Vilhjálmur Vilhjálmsson (singer) (1945–1978), Icelandic musician and singer
- Vilhjálmur Vilmundarson (1929–2020), Icelandic athlete
