= Les Ventes =

- Commune
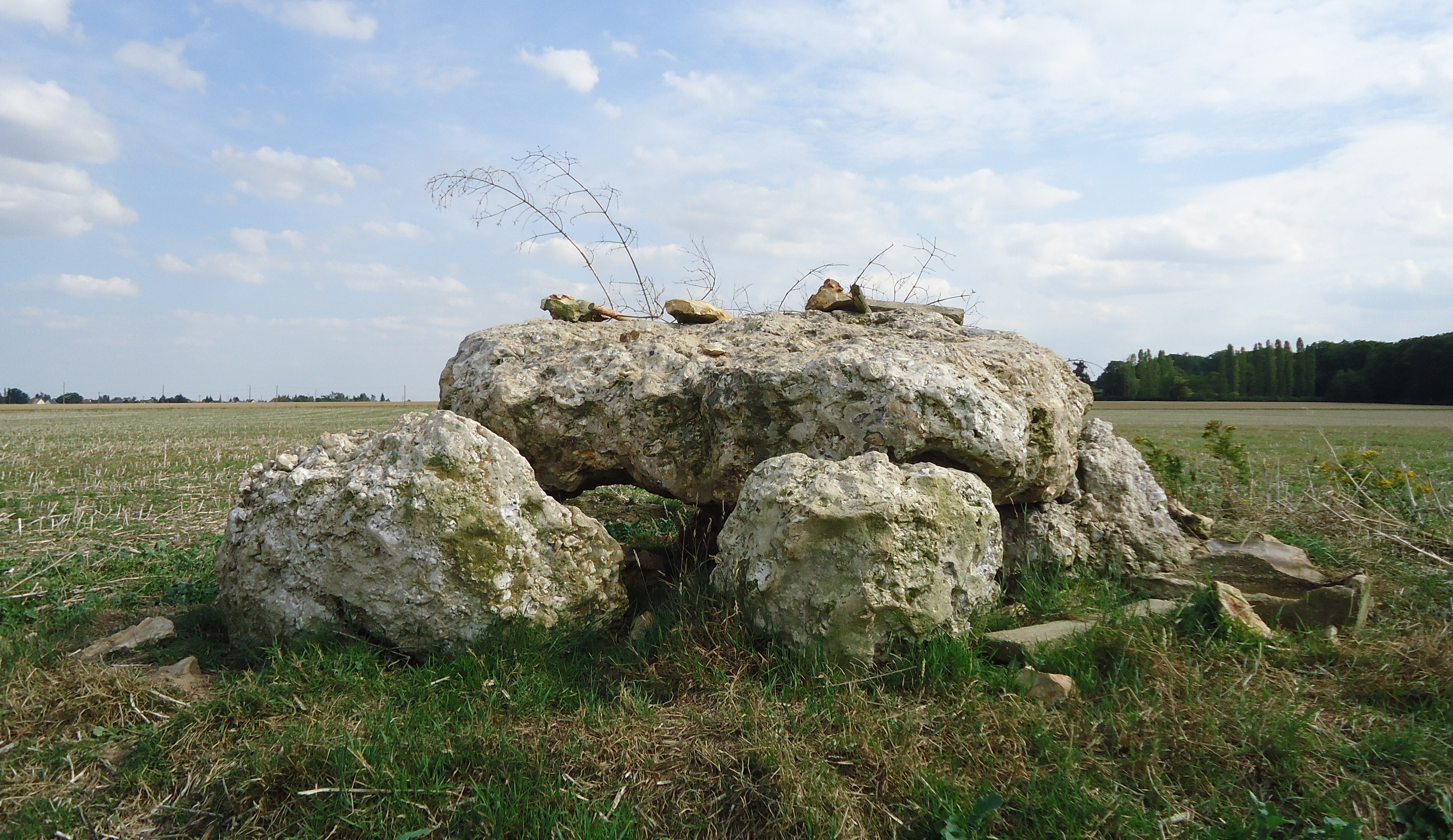
- Dolmen

- Coat of arms
- Location of Les Ventes
- Location within France Location within Normandy
- Coordinates: 48°56′59″N 1°05′19″E
- Country: France
- Region: Normandy
- Department: Eure
- Arrondissement: Évreux
- Canton: Conches-en-Ouche
- Intercommunality: CA Évreux Portes de Normandie

Government
  - Mayor (2020–2026): Stéphane Simon
- Area^{1}: 20.65 km^{2} (7.97 sq mi)
- Elevation: 152 m (499 ft)
- Highest elevation: 156 m (512 ft)
- Lowest elevation: 84 m (276 ft)
- Population (2023): 1,052
  - Density: 50.94/km^{2} (131.9/sq mi)
- Time zone: UTC+01:00 (CET)
  - Summer (DST): UTC+02:00 (CEST)
- INSEE/Postal code: 27678 /27180
- ^{1} French Land Register data, which excludes lakes, ponds, glaciers > 1 km^{2} (0.386 sq mi or 247 acres) and river estuaries.

Les Ventes (French pronunciation: [le vɑ̃t]) is a commune in the Eure department in the Normandy region in Northern France.

In World War II, American pilot Lt. Billie D. Harris died after crashing in combat near the town (deliberately avoiding houses and causing no victims among the villagers). Since his death the town has memorialised him; he was initially buried there and the main town square was named after him. His widow, Peggy, was unaware of his status until 2005, as she thought he had gone missing and had not been found.

== Population ==
Historical population
Year	Pop.	±% p.a.
1968	324	—
1975	500	+6.39%
1982	965	+9.85%
1990	1,035	+0.88%
1999	1,006	−0.32%
2007	1,040	+0.42%
2012	1,040	+0.00%
2017	1,041	+0.02%
2023	1,052	+0.18%
Source: INSEE

== See also ==
- Communes of the Eure department
