= Minarapa Rangihatuake =

New Zealand missionary (died 1893)

Minarapa Rangihatuake (?–1893) was a New Zealand Methodist missionary responsible for the first Wellington church. Of Māori descent, he identified with the Ngā Māhanga hapū of the Taranaki iwi.

== Early life ==
Also known as Minarapa Te Atua-kē, and commonly referred to as Minarapa, was born in the early nineteenth century in Taranaki. He was of the Ngā Māhanga. In an attack against the Taranaki tribes, he was taken captive by Waikato. Then, while in the Waikato, he was captured by Ngāpuhi.

== Missionary influence ==
The rise of missionary influence led the captives to liberation and those who adopted Christianity went to reside in mission stations. Minarapa ended up in the Wesleyans' Māngungu Mission in the Hokianga. There he was appointed a lay preacher for which he received £1 and four white shirts as payment. In 1839 he went as a missionary to his Taranaki people then residing at Te Whanganui-a-Tara (Wellington Harbour). In 1842 he returned to Taranaki. Wiremu Te Kāhui Kararehe was a son of his.
