= Ota Pavel =

Czech writer and sport publicist (1930–1973)

- Ota Pavel
- Born: Otto Popper; 2 July 1930; Prague, Czechoslovakia
- Died: 31 March 1973 (aged 42); Prague, Czechoslovakia
- Resting place: New Jewish Cemetery, Prague
- Occupations: Writer, journalist, sport reporter
- Writing career
- Notable works: Jak jsem potkal ryby ('How I Came to Know Fish'); Zlatí úhoři (Golden Eels); Smrt krásných srnců

Ota Pavel (born Otto Popper; 2 July 1930, in Prague – 31 March 1973, in Prague) was a Czech writer, journalist and sport reporter. He is primarily an author of autobiographical and biographical novels.

== Biography ==
He was born in Prague as the third and youngest son of a Jewish father, Leo Popper, who was a travelling salesman, and a Czech Christian mother. The family celebrated both Jewish and Christian holidays.

During World War II, his father and both his older brothers were imprisoned in Nazi concentration camps (his brother Jiří was imprisoned in Mauthausen). Otto remained with their mother, in Buštěhrad. Young Otto briefly worked as a miner in the Kladno Region. Both brothers and father survived Nazi imprisonment and returned home after the end of the World War. In 1960 Otto graduated at the Střední škola pro pracující (High School for Workers).

He was an enthusiastic hockey player and played on the junior team of HC Sparta Praha, but his hopes for a professional ice-hockey career were dashed by a serious illness and tonsillectomy. He stayed on with Sparta for a short time to train its junior team. In 1949 his close friend Arnošt Lustig recommended that he concentrate on writing, and as a result, Popper was engaged as a sports reporter by Czechoslovak Radio. In 1955 he changed his name to Ota Pavel. From 1956 to 1957 he was a sports reporter for the journal Stadion (Stadium), then contributed for a few years to the army journal Československý voják (Czechoslovak Soldier). His first literary attempts (mainly short sport-related feuilletons) were published in Stadion.

His work as a journalist took him to the Soviet Union. He was also allowed to travel to Western countries, including France and Switzerland. In 1962 he visited the United States with the Czech football team Dukla Prague.

During the 1964 Winter Olympics in Innsbruck he showed signs of the mental illness that would later end his official journalistic career. He later described the episode in his book How I Came to Know Fish:

"I went mad at the winter Olympics in Innsbruck. My brain got cloudy, as if a fog from the Alps had enveloped it. In that condition I came face to face with one gentleman - the Devil. He looked the part! He had hooves, fur, horns, and rotten teeth that looked hundreds of years old. With this figure in my mind I climbed the hills above Innsbruck and torched a farm building. I was convinced that only a brilliant bonfire could burn off that fog. As I was leading the cows and horses from the barn, the Austrian police arrived..."

Following this he was diagnosed with bipolar disorder. In 1966 the effects of this disease led to his retirement and thereafter several admissions to mental hospitals for treatment. This difficult period in his life was also his most creative, in which he produced his strongest and most lyrical collections, including How I Came to Know Fish.

Ota Pavel's work was focused on sports, especially fishing. Some of his works were adapted for the film: Zlatí úhoři (Golden Eels) (starring Vladimír Menšík) and Smrt krásných srnců.

Two of his books, Golden Eels and How I Came to Know Fish were translated into English.

In 1973 Ota Pavel died of a sudden heart attack caused by an unknown condition. He was 42 years old. He is buried at the New Jewish cemetery in Prague-Žižkov, next to his father.

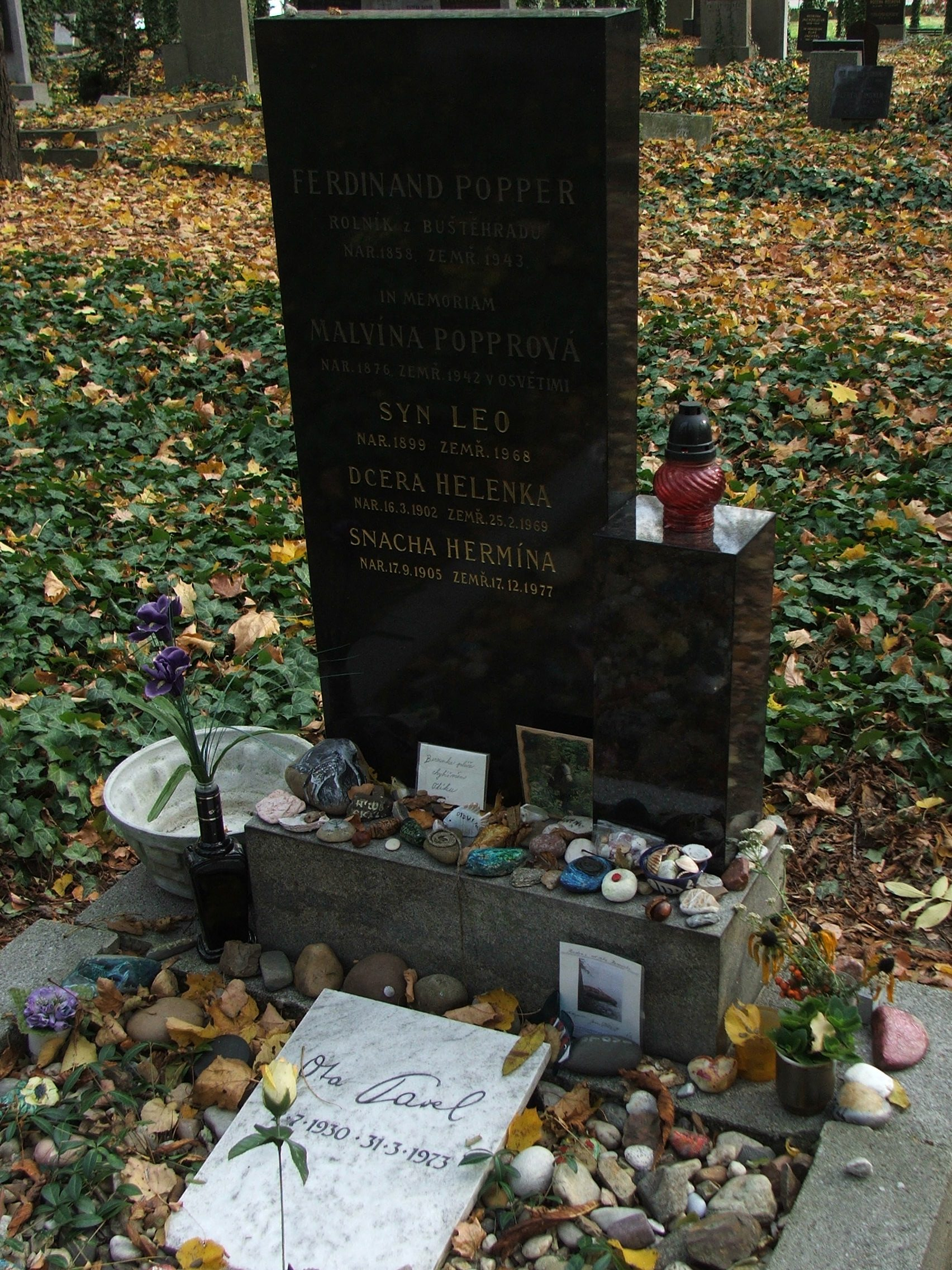
Ota Pavel's grave

== Work ==
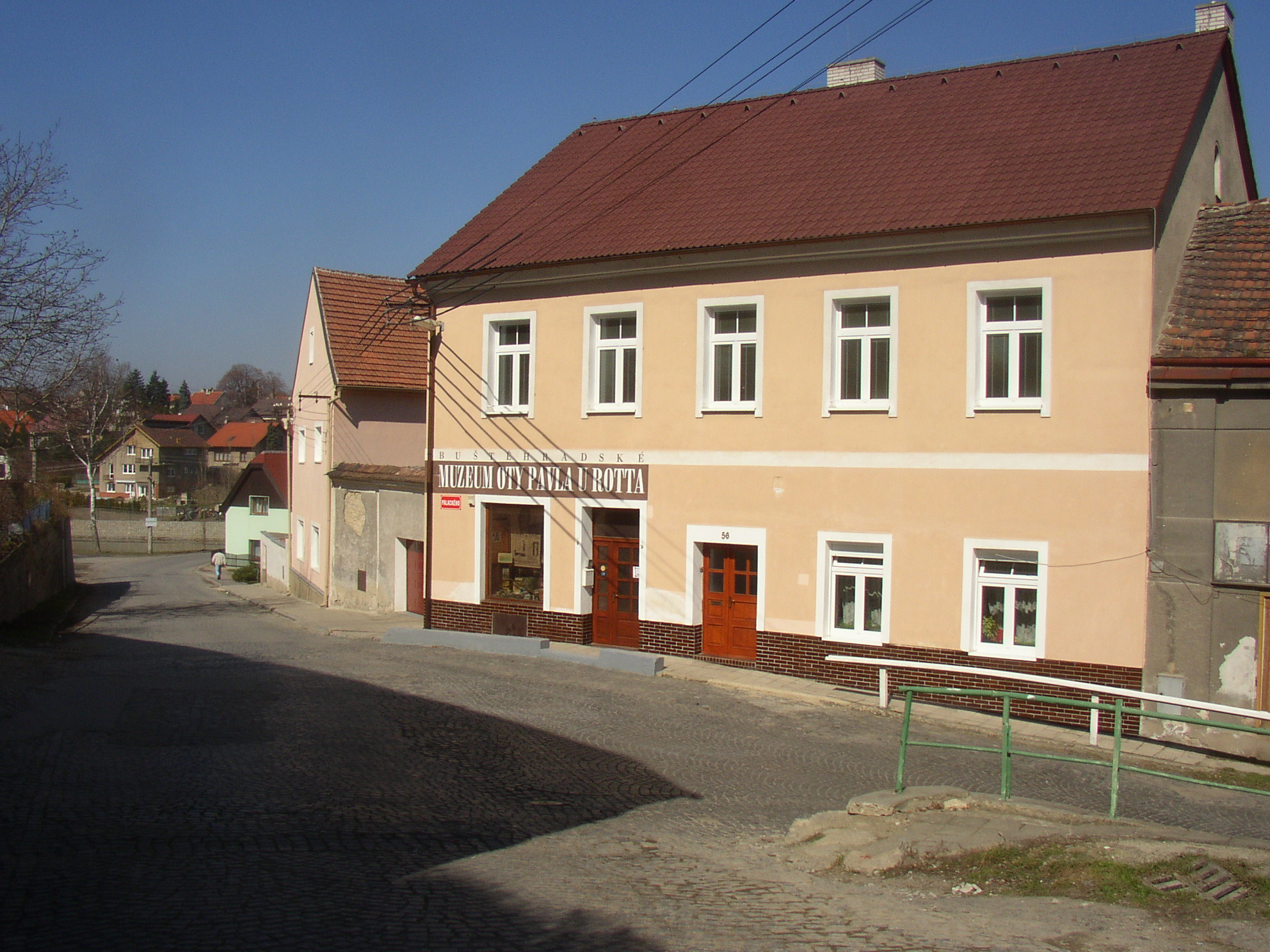
Buštěhrad museum of Ota Pavel

- Hory a lidé, 1964 – book of photographs by Vilém Heckel, Pavel was the author of text
- Dukla mezi mrakodrapy, 1964 – sport theme, about the success of the Czech football team Dukla Praha in USA.
- Plná bedna šampaňského, 1967 – short stories
- Cena vítězství, 1968 – anthology
- Pohár od Pánaboha, 1971
- Smrt krásných srnců, 1971 – memoirs of childhood and youth
- Syn celerového krále, 1972 – 16 short stories about famous sportsmen
- Jak jsem potkal ryby, 1974 – memoirs
- Pohádka o Raškovi, 1974 – "sport fairytale", inspired by the success of the Czech ski jumper Jiří Raška

Published posthumously:

- Fialový poustevník, 1977
- Sedm deka zlata, 1980
- Veliký vodní tulák, 1980 – anthology
- Zlatí úhoři (Golden Eels), 1985, new edition 1991
- Výstup na Eiger, 1989
- Mám rád tu řeku, 1989
- Jak šel táta Afrikou: Povídky, 1994 - short stories
- Omyl a jiné povídky, 1995 - short stories
- Olympijské hry a jiné povídky, 1996 - short stories
