= Billie J. Swalla =

American scientist

- Education: University of Iowa (BSc)(Ms)(PhD)
- Scientific career
- Workplaces: University of Iowa; Station Biologique de Roscoff; University of California; Vanderbilt University; Pennsylvania State University; Friday Harbor Laboratories; University of Washington
- Website: faculty.washington.edu/bjswalla/

Billie J. Swalla is a professor of biology at the University of Washington. She was the first female director of Friday Harbor Laboratories, where she worked from 2012 to 2019. Her lab investigates the evolution of chordates by comparative genetic and phylogenetic analysis of animal taxa.

== Education ==
Billie Swalla earned her Bachelor of Science in Zoology from the University of Iowa in 1980. She earned a Master of Science there, with a thesis on chicken egg development in 1983. She then took an Embryology course at the Marine Biological Lab in Woods Hole, Massachusetts. She earned her PhD in Biology, also at Iowa, on chicken egg development in 1988. She became a Post-Doctoral Fellow with William R. Jeffery studying gene expression during ascidian egg development. In 1988, Swalla and Jeffery traveled to the Station Biologique in Roscoff, France, to study the evolution and development of ascidians. Shortly after, Swalla won a Post-Doctoral Fellowship from the National Institutes of Health to study developmental biology at the Bodega Marine Laboratory at the University of California.

In 1994, Swalla worked as an assistant professor of Biology at Vanderbilt University for three years. She then worked as an assistant professor at Pennsylvania State University from 1997 to 1999 before settling at the University of Washington.

== Research ==
Swalla's research is on molecular analysis of invertebrate evolution and development, and ranges from studying hemichordates to chordates to ctenophores. By studying hemichordates, she examines the genomics of chordate development to understand the evolution of the chordate body plan. Her work on other animal taxa, such as echinoderms and hemichordates, provides comparisons in gene expression and body plan development.

Swalla has developed a theory on physical features of the chordate ancestor. While gill slits are homologous between hemichordates and chordates, gill bars are not. She is studying the evolutionary history of other ancestral chordate features across taxa. She is looking into the phylogenetic diversity of hemichordates and how the evolution of a nervous system differs between species. Having studied the genetics of chordate development in ascidians, she is examining the evolution of coloniality and social dynamics of ascidian species.

== Leadership ==
Swalla has served as Program Officer for the Division of Developmental and Cell Biology within the Society for Integrative and Comparative Biology (1996-1999), Chairman of the Electorate Nominating Committee for Biological Sciences (2001-2004), President of the Society for Integrative and Comparative Biology (2013-2015), and President of the PanAm Society of EvoDevo Biology (2017-2019). She was also the first female director of Friday Harbor Laboratories (FHL), from 2012–2019.

As director of FHL, Swalla established a Marine Biology major for University of Washington students, and fellowships and professorships to bring faculty to FHL. She led fundraising efforts of over $10,000,000 and created a Fire Mitigation plan to protect the campus from wildfires.

== Outreach and inclusion ==
Swalla has emphasized outreach and inclusion. As director, she expanded a Research Experience for Undergraduates (REU) program through the National Science Foundation specifically for Friday Harbor Laboratories, to provide underrepresented students the chance to engage in scientific research over a summer. She had regular communication with the communities living around FHL on land conservation efforts and the marine habitats surrounding the residents, and shared their research through Tide Bites, a monthly publication available both online and in print for the communities around FHL. Swalla is a member of the Society for Advancing Hispanics/Chicanos and Native Americans in Science (SACNAS) and has worked to increase representation in the sciences. She has mentored REU students, taught sessions at local elementary schools, high schools, and community colleges, and in international workshops to multinational audiences.

== Awards ==
In 2022, Swalla was awarded the Pan American Society for Evolutionary Developmental Biology Service Award. In 2025, Swalla was awarded the Society for Developmental Biology Lifetime Achievement Award.

== Publications ==
- Swalla, Billie J.; Jeffery, William R. (1996-11-15). "Requirement of the Manx Gene for Expression of Chordate Features in a Tailless Ascidian Larva". Science. 274 (5290): 1205–1208. Bibcode:1996Sci...274.1205S. doi:10.1126/science.274.5290.1205. PMID 8895472. S2CID 45889536.
- Cameron, Chris B.; Garey, James R.; Swalla, Billie J. (2000-04-25). "Evolution of the chordate body plan: New insights from phylogenetic analyses of deuterostome phyla". Proceedings of the National Academy of Sciences of the United States of America. 97 (9): 4469–4474. doi:10.1073/pnas.97.9.4469. PMC 18258. PMID 10781046.
- Brown, Federico D.; Prendergast, Andrew; Swalla, Billie J. (2008). "Man is but a worm: Chordate origins". Genesis. 46 (11): 605–613. doi:10.1002/dvg.20471. PMID 19003926.
- Swalla, Billie J; Smith, Andrew B (2008-04-27). "Deciphering deuterostome phylogeny: molecular, morphological and palaeontological perspectives". Philosophical Transactions of the Royal Society B: Biological Sciences. 363 (1496): 1557–1568. doi:10.1098/rstb.2007.2246. PMC 2615822. PMID 18192178.
- Tassia, Michael G.; Cannon, Johanna T.; Konikoff, Charlotte E.; Shenkar, Noa; Halanych, Kenneth M.; Swalla, Billie J. (2016-10-04). "The Global Diversity of Hemichordata". PLOS ONE. 11 (10) e0162564. Bibcode:2016PLoSO..1162564T. doi:10.1371/journal.pone.0162564. PMC 5049775. PMID 27701429.
- Luttrell, Shawn M.; Gotting, Kirsten; Ross, Eric; Alvarado, Alejandro Sánchez; Swalla, Billie J. (December 2016). "Head regeneration in hemichordates is not a strict recapitulation of development". Developmental Dynamics. 245 (12): 1159–1175. doi:10.1002/dvdy.24457. PMC 5129524. PMID 27649280.
