= Billie Pitcheneder =

Australian fundraiser and community worker

Norma Catherine (Billie), Pitcheneder, née Harris BEM also Nichols (16 May 1916 - May 2002) was a prolific fundraiser and community worker of Darwin in the Northern Territory of Australia. She was best known as "Auntie Billie".

== Early life ==
Pitcheneder was born in Fremantle in Western Australia, the second child of James Harris and Lillian May. Her parents ran a contracting business supplying ships at the port of Fremantle with food and other requirements.

She first came to the Northern Territory when she spent a holiday in Darwin from October to December 1941 but was advised to leave as the Pacific war was about to break out. During the war, she joined Australian Women's Army Service as a transport driver, training and serving in Melbourne.

She then applied for a managers job for a miners' mess at Marble Bar, where she met and married her first husband. She also ran the Pier Hotel, Port Hedland.

== Life in the Northern Territory ==
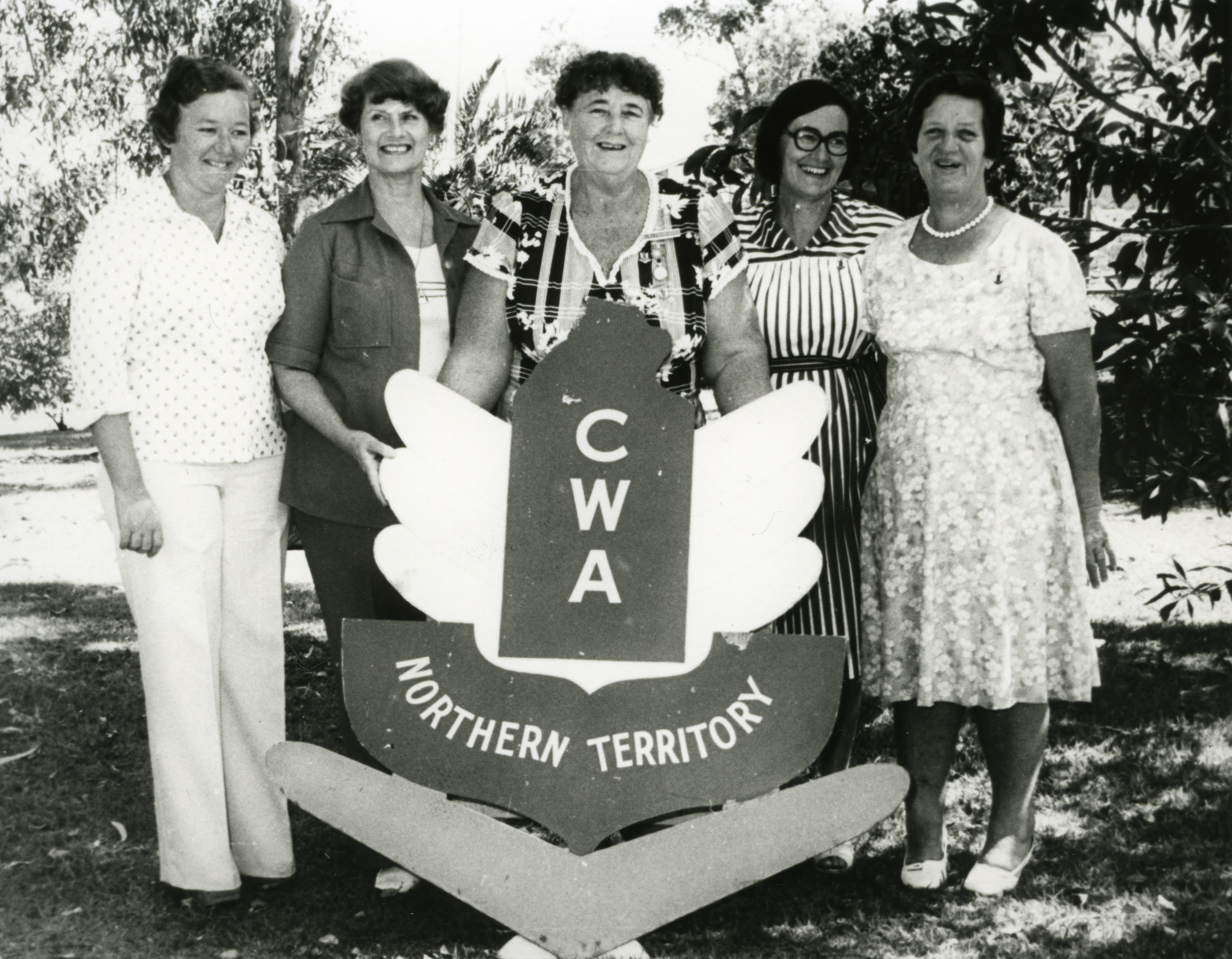
Billie Pitcheneder (centre) and other Country Women's Association members

Pitcheneder returned to Darwin on 18 February 1948. She worked at Snell's contracting company working in the mess helping to cook for about 90 workers each day. She then started her own catering business for 12 years including running tuckshops for schools in Darwin.

Pitcheneder took on many fund raising and charity activities for many causes such as Country Women's Association, Red Cross, Lions and Lionesses Clubs, Blind Appeal, RSL, Hospital Patient's Christmas Appeal, Pensioners Association, Salvation Army, Guide Dogs and Girl Guides. She was the Darwin branch president of the Legion of Ex-Service Men and Women. She also organised Darwin's first Mardi Gras.

She married Peter Pitcheneder in 1961. He was a prisoner-of-war in Western Australia, after being captured by a British vessel. He came to Darwin in 1961, as the ship's cook on the Denman. While delayed, Billie offered to show him around Darwin. They were engaged by the end of the week. Hundreds flocked to the wedding at the United Church in Darwin. He died in 1977.

After Cyclone Tracy Pitcheneder collected donations for the Chung Wah Society to allow the Chinese temple to be repaired. She also raised money to enable Vietnam Veterans from Darwin to attend a victory march in Sydney. She became a familiar figure outside Woolworths selling raffle tickets or collecting donations.

She did almost 30 years of fundraising and service to the community. She was particularly well known for fundraising outside the Woolworths in central Darwin, collecting donation and selling raffle tickets. She retired from these efforts in 1983.

== Legacy ==
Pitcheneder was awarded a British Empire Medal (BEM) in 1977. She also won a Queens Jubilee Medal and many life memberships of the various clubs she supported. In 1980 she was named Citizen of the Year by Australia Day Committee and in 1990 she received the Prize for Outstanding Voluntary Community Service from the Casuarina Community Foundation. She also was awarded the 123rd Humanist Award of the Rosicrucian Order.

Pitcheneder tripped and "went Apex over Rotary" and broke her leg in 1988 affecting her mobility. She died at the age of 86 in Darwin in 2002.

The street in Parap where she lived was named Pitcheneder Court after her in 1981.
