= Pātara Te Tuhi =

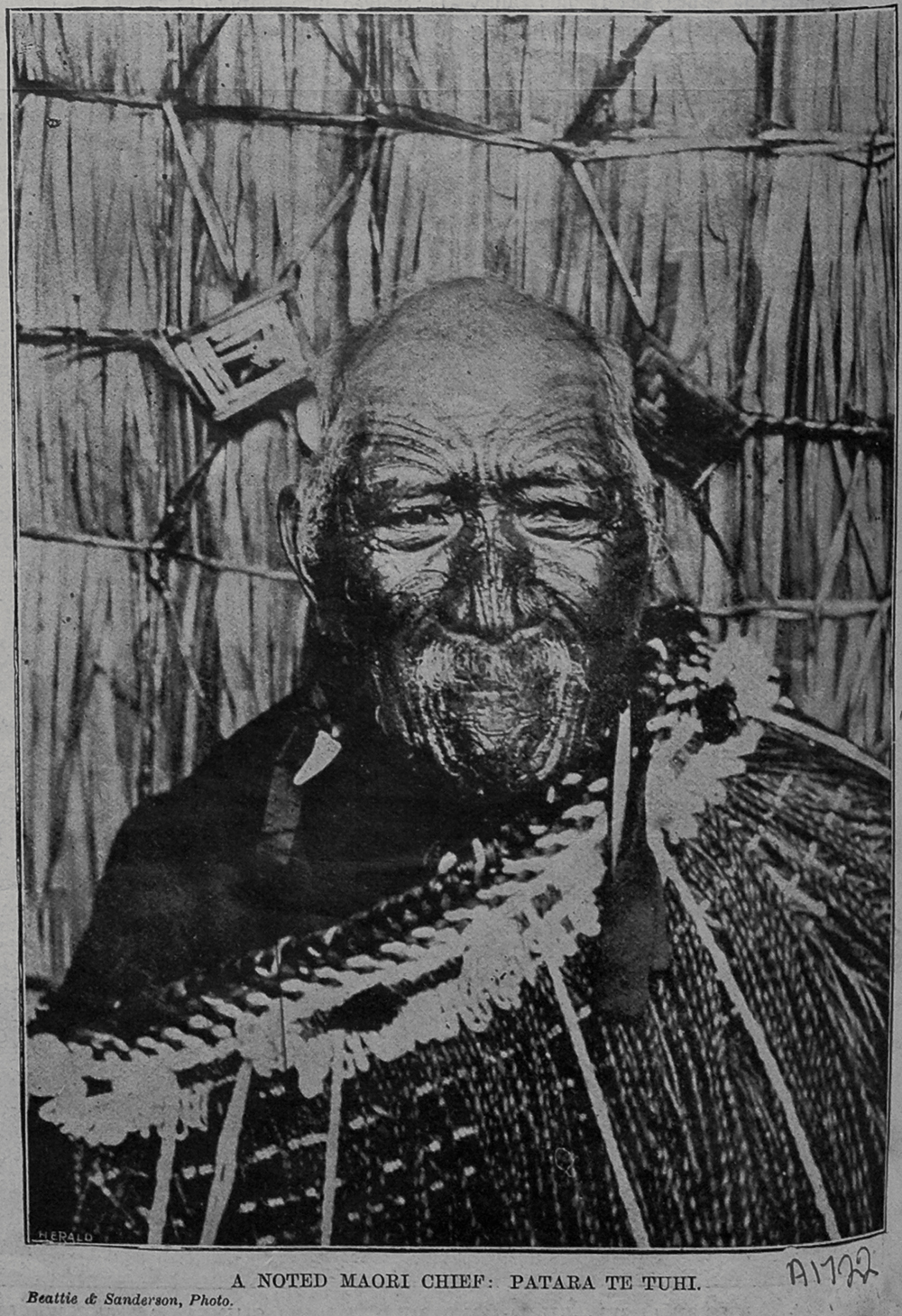

Wiremu Pātara Te Tuhi (? – 2 July 1910) was a notable New Zealand tribal leader, newspaper editor, warrior and secretary to the Māori king. Of Māori descent, he identified with the Waikato iwi, Ngāti Mahuta and Ngāti Wairere. He was born in Waikato, New Zealand. Nelson Illingworth produced a sculpture of Te Tuhi as part of an ethnological series commissioned by the New Zealand government in 1908, which is now in the taonga Māori collection at Te Papa.
