= Vilém =

Vilém is a Czech masculine given name, a variant of the Germanic name William. Notable people with the name include:

== Arts and entertainment ==
- Vilém Blodek (1834–1874), Czech composer, flautist and pianist
- Vilém Heš (1860–1908), Czech opera singer
- Vilém Heckel (1918–1970), Czech photographer
- Vilém Kurz (1872–1945), Czech pianist and piano teacher
- Vilém Mrštík (1863–1912), Czech writer and dramatist
- Vilém Petrželka (1889–1967), Czech composer and conductor
- Vilém Přibyl (1925–1990), Czech opera singer
- Vilem Sokol (1915–2011), Czech-American conductor and professor of music
- Vilém Tauský (1910–2004), Czech conductor and composer
- Vilém Veverka (born 1978), Czech oboist
- Vilém Wünsche (1900–1984), Czech painter, graphic artist and illustrator
- Vilém Závada (1905–1982), Czech poet, translator and journalist

== Sports ==
- Vilém Goppold Jr. (1893–1945), Czech fencer
- Vilém Goppold von Lobsdorf (1869–1943), Czech fencer
- Vilém König (1903–1973), Czech football player and manager
- Vilém Lugr (1911–1981), Czech football player and manager
- Vilém Mandlík (1936–2023), Czech runner
- Vilém Šindler (1903–1982), Czech runner
- Vilém Stráský (born 1999), Czech athlete
- Vilém Tvrzský (1880–1943), Czech fencer

== Other ==
- Vilém Dušan Lambl (1824–1895), Czech medical doctor
- Vilém Flusser (1920–1991), Czech-Brazilian philosopher
- Vilém Gajdušek (1895–1977), Czech optician and telescope designer
- Vilém Kinský (1574–1634), Czech nobleman
- Vilém Klíma (1906–1985), Czech electrical engineer
- Vilém Mathesius (1882–1945), Czech linguist and literary historian
- Vilém II of Pernštejn (1438–1521), Czech nobleman
- Vilém Prusinovský z Víckova (1534–1572), Czech bishop
- František Vilém Rosický (1847–1909), Czech botanist and zoologist
- Vilém Slavata of Chlum (1572–1652), Czech nobleman
- Václav Vilém Václavíček (1788–1862), Czech priest and theological writer
