= Vilis =

- Gender: Male
- Name day: 28 May

Origin
- Region of origin: Latvia

Other names
- Related names: Vilhelms

Vilis is a Latvian masculine given name and may refer to:

- Vilis Daudziņš (b. 1970), Latvian theater and film actor
- Vilis Janums (1894–1981), Latvian military officer
- Vilis Krištopans (b. 1954), Latvian politician, former Prime Minister of Latvia
- Vilis Lācis (1904–1966), Latvian writer and communist politician
- Vilis Olavs (1867–1917), Latvian political theorist, writer, and humanitarian

Other uses

- "Vili's" is the trading name of Vili Milisits, South Australian baker, businessman and philanthropist
