= Billie Orr =

American politician

Billie J. Orr
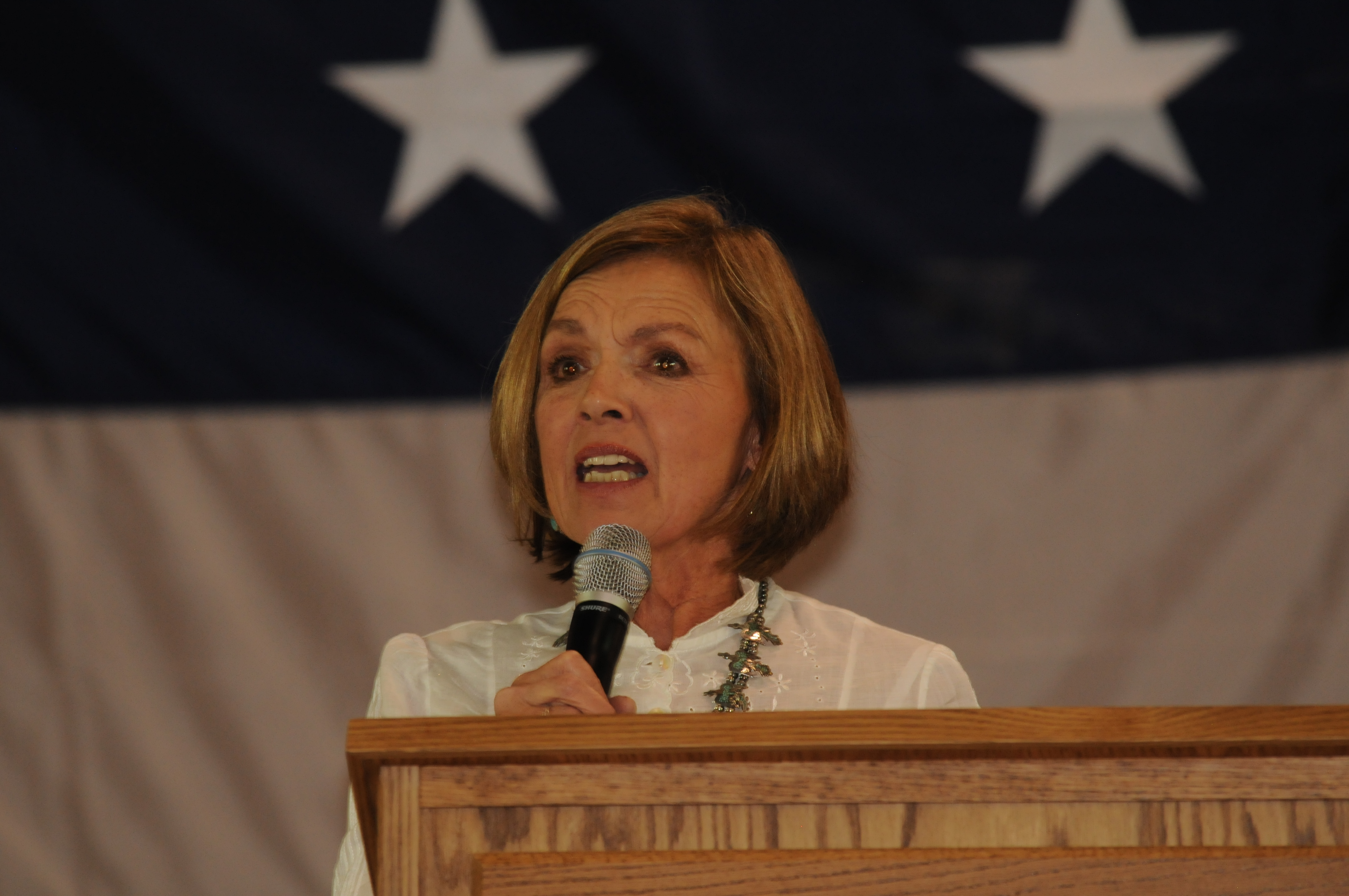
- Billie Orr 2009
- Education: BA, Education Arizona State University, 1970 MA, Reading Education Arizona State University, 1972 EdD, Education Leadership Arizona State University, 1994

Billie J. Orr is an American advocate for political and education reform. She is the former president of the Education Leaders Council, and former deputy Superintendent of Public Instruction for the state of Arizona . She was the principal of Kiva School in Scottsdale, Arizona from 1994 to 1997.

She lives in Prescott, Arizona and has been active in the Tea Party movement in both Prescott and Bozeman, Montana. In January 2015 she became a candidate for the Prescott city council.

== Professional background ==
Billie Orr has been active in Tea Party and Republican Party issues for several years, specifically advocating limited government and repealing common core education standards.

Orr was active in public education for over twenty years in Arizona, and became the deputy Superintendent of Public Education. With her leadership, Arizona implemented the most vigorous charter school program in the country.

She left the Arizona Department of Education in 2001 to become the president of the Education Leaders Council in Washington, D.C. Education Leaders Council is a non-profit, conservative education reform organization founded by a number of state school officials in 1995. It was an alternative to Council of Chief State School Officers, a more liberal oriented organization with close ties to the teacher unions such as National Education Association (NEA) and the American Federation of Teachers (AFT). In that role she actively promoted increased standards in education and teacher preparation. ELC gained federal funding for its project, Following the Leaders, to implement the reform policies of the new federal education law. However, an investigation by the U.S. Department of Education initially suggested that ELC did not comply with federal regulations for the funds it was expending, and federal procurement standards. A final audit, however, showed that ELC's financial and administrative management had actually undercharged the Department of Education and outstanding grant funding was ultimately paid to the ELC and its spin-off organization, Following the Leaders by the Department of Education. Orr's original contract was extended to 2004.

She has consistently promoted school choice and advocated at the local, state, and national levels for increased standards for students and teacher preparation, emphasizing equality for all students from the gifted, to special needs children, to the disadvantaged. In this effort she worked closely with local, state and federal officials.

She serves as the director of Willow Hills Baptist Church adult bible studies and is a volunteer serving brain-injured individuals and Special Olympics. Previously she was director of advancement at the Montana Bible College.

== Personal ==
Billie Orr is married and has a son who is a pilot in the United States Navy.
