= Billie Melman =

Israeli historian

Billie Melman (Hebrew: בילי מלמן) is professor of history at Tel Aviv University, Henri Glasberg Chair in European Studies, a member of the Israel Academy of Sciences and Humanities, and a fellow of the Royal Historical Society. In 2026, she received the Israel Prize for General History.

Melman specializes in British social and cultural history and in history of empires, and has written extensively on colonialism and culture, cultures of history and on gender history and historiography. Most recently, in a book published in 2020; Melman wrote on the rediscovery of Near Eastern antiquity in the 20th century.

== Publications ==
=== Books ===
- Empires of Antiquities: Modernity and the Rediscovery of the Ancient Near East, 1914-1950 (Oxford University Press, 2020)
- London: Place, People and Empire (Hebrew) (Second ed., Tel Aviv, 2014)
- The Culture of History: English Uses of the Past 1800-1953 (Oxford, 2006)
- Women's Orients: Englishwomen and the Middle East, Sexuality, Religion and Work (London, second, revised ed., 1995)
- Women and the Popular Imagination in the Twenties-Flappers and Nymphs (London, 1988)

=== Edited volumes ===
- Popularizing National Pasts 1800 to the Present (ed. with Stefan Berger and Chris Lorenz) (London and New York, 2012)
- Borderlines Genders and Identities in War and Peace 1870-1930 (ed.) (London and New York, 1998)
