= Vilhelms =

Male given name

- Gender: Male
- Name day: 28 May

Origin
- Region of origin: Latvia

Other names
- Related names: Vilis, William, Wilhelm, Guillaume

Vilhelms is a Latvian masculine given name, cognate of the English name William. The diminutive form of Vilhelms is Vilis.

People bearing the name Vilhelms include:

- Vilhelms Bokslafs (1858–1945), Baltic German-Latvian architect
- Vilhelms Knoriņš (1890–1939), Latvian Bolshevik revolutionary, Soviet politician and publicist
- Vilhelms Purvītis (1872–1945), Latvian landscape painter and educator
