= Bodega Marine Lab =

Coastal field station and research facility

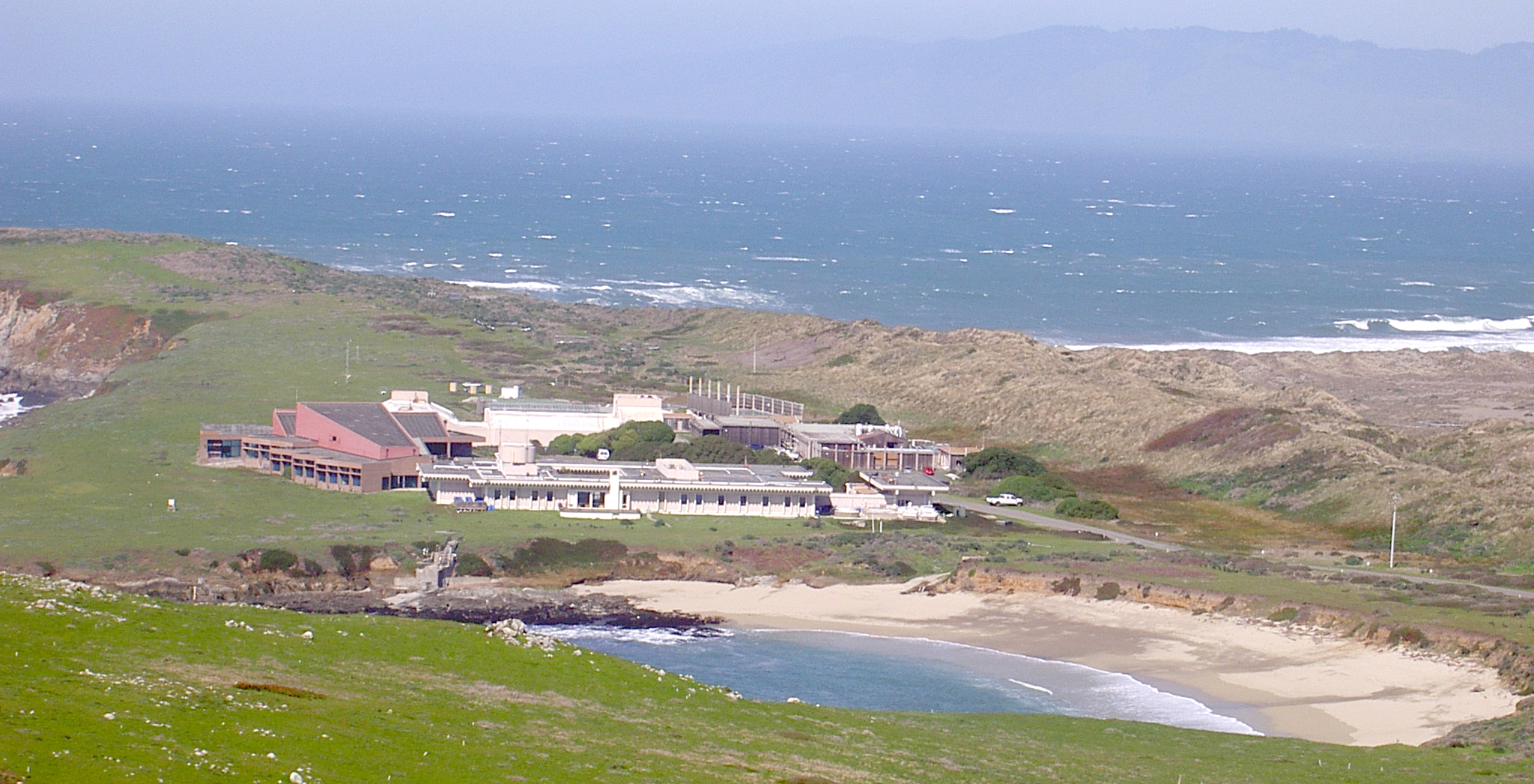

The Bodega Marine Lab is a coastal field station/research facility that has fallen under the purview of the University of California Davis since 1983. Initially established in 1960 under the supervision of UC Berkeley, the marine lab has since doubled in size.

Fields of study at BML include marine aquaculture, environmental toxicology, invertebrate biology, ocean acidification, and coastal oceanography, and the marine lab contains spaces for conferences, research, classrooms, and boating and diving programs.

The Bodega Marine Lab houses the stewards and scientists responsible for caring for the surrounding lands of the Bodega Marine Reserve, and lies within the National Oceanographic and Atmospheric Administration's Greater Farallones National Marine Sanctuary. NOAA has three weather stations at the marine lab, and the California Department of Fish and Wildlife has two permanent members of staff stationed at BML.

As of Fall 2023, the marine lab is open to the public every Friday from 2PM-4PM, when docents give guided tours of the marine lab and short lectures on its history.

== Ongoing Research ==
=== Long-Term Microplastic Monitoring ===
BML's Toxicology, Physiology, Ecology, and Conservation (ToPEC) Lab has established a long-term, community-based microplastic monitoring program at the Bodega Marine Reserve (BMR) and surrounding local aquatic habitats. Their goal is to investigate microplastic accumulation in the environment by systematically collecting and analyzing samples of seawater and sediment from different topographic sites within BMR, to help understand the factors that influence the accumulation and persistence of microplastics. Current efforts include investigating microplastic pollution within organisms at different trophic levels, providing insights into trophic transfer and biomagnification potential.

=== Native Oyster Restoration ===
In the early 2000s, the Aquatic Resources Group at the Bodega Marine Lab documented a population of Olympia oyster while conducting an environmental impact assessment at the San Francisco Airport. Since then, ARG has developed practices to both support wild populations of Olympia oyster, and rear them in aquaculture. Current efforts allow for culturing Olympia oysters in the hundreds of thousands, which allows for collaboration with other conservation oriented scientists and also aquaculture companies like Hog Island Oyster Company.

=== Urchin Ranching ===
BML's Aquatic Resources Group has been developing techniques for "urchin ranching", a practice wherein purple urchins are collected from the wild and kept in aquaculture enclosures, a "ranch", to rear them with ample food resources with the goal of cultivating uni that can be sold in markets.

=== White Abalone Captive Breeding ===
BML acts as the headquarters for the white abalone captive breeding program. The existing White Abalone Culture (WAC) Lab works in concert with CDFW's Shellfish Pathology & Health Lab to breed & rear white abalone in an aquaculture setting. Since 2012, this program has produced over 100,000 white abalone that have survived through their first year, and over four thousand captive-bred white abalone have been out-planted (returned to the Pacific Ocean).
