= Blair Hrovat =

American football player and coach (born 1962)

Biographical details
- Born: November 20, 1962 (age 63)

Playing career
- 1981–1984: Edinboro
- Position: Quarterback

Coaching career (HC unless noted)
- c. 1990: San Francisco State (assistant)
- 1992–1997: South Dakota (AHC/OC)
- 1998–2001: Allegheny
- 2005: Sequoyah HS (GA) (assistant))
- 2006: Indiana State (OC)
- 2010–2011: Princeton Community HS (IN)

Head coaching record
- Overall: 26–14 (college); 0–20 (high school)

Blair Hrovat (born November 20, 1962) is an American football coach and former player. Hrovat was the head football coach at Allegheny College in Meadville, Pennsylvania for four seasons, from 1998 to 2001, compiling a record of 26–14. He was forced to resign this position due to falsifications on his resume. Hrovat was the head football coach at Princeton Community High School in Princeton, Indiana from 2010 to 2011.

== Head coaching record ==
=== College ===
Year	Team	Overall	Conference	Standing	Bowl/playoffs
Allegheny Gators (North Coast Athletic Conference) (1998–2001)
1998	Allegheny	8–2	6–1	2nd	
1999	Allegheny	6–4	4–2	T–2nd	
2000	Allegheny	7–3	6–1	2nd	
2001	Allegheny	5–5	4–3	4th	
Allegheny:		26–14	20–7		
Total:		26–14			
