= Wiremu Te Kāhui Kararehe =

Taranaki leader, historian

Wiremu Te Kāhui Kararehe (1846–1904) was a notable New Zealand tribal leader and historian. Of Māori descent, he identified with the Taranaki iwi. He was born in Te Ahoroa Pa, Taranaki, New Zealand in 1846. His father was Minarapa Rangihatuake.
