= Billie D. Harris =

World War II American fighter pilot (1922–1944)

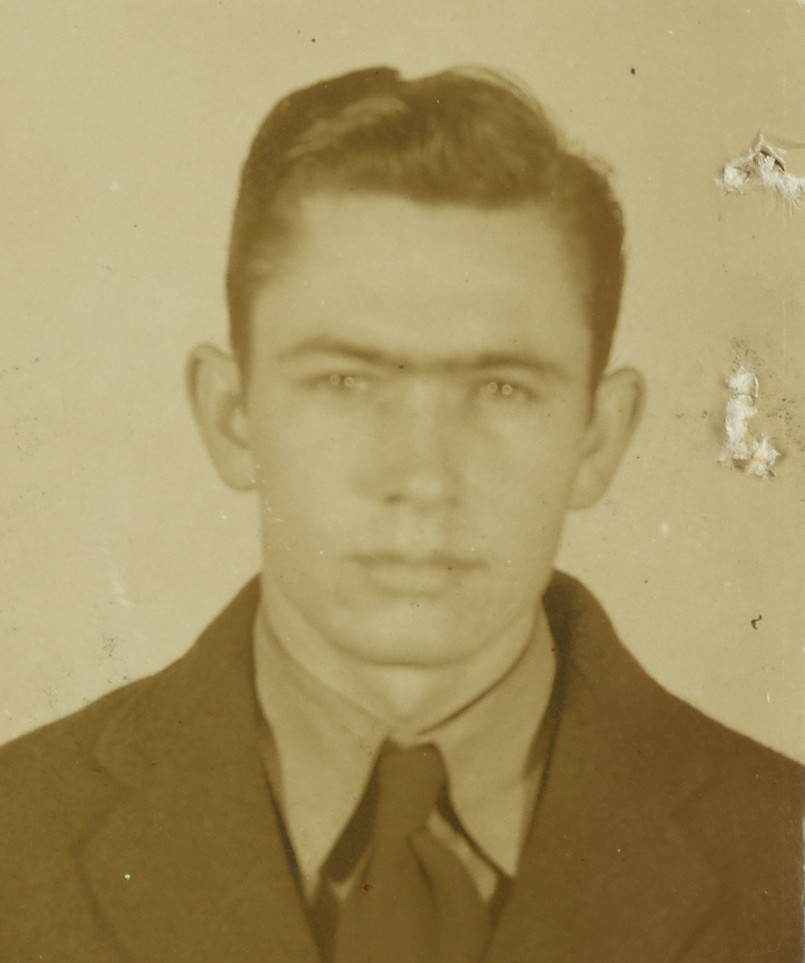
- Harris c. 1943
- Born: Billie Dowe Harris; October 14, 1922; Jackson County, Oklahoma, United States
- Died: July 17, 1944 (aged 21); Les Ventes, Normandy, France
- Military career
- Allegiance: United States
- Branch: US Army Air Corps
- Service years: 1944
- Rank: Lieutenant
- Service number: 0-682635
- Commands: 354th Fighter Group; 355th Fighter Squadron
- Conflicts: World War II
- Awards: Distinguished Flying Cross; Air Medal; Purple Heart

Billie D. Harris (October 14, 1922 - July 17, 1944) was an American lieutenant fighter pilot enlisted in the United States Army Air Force assigned to the 355th Fighter Squadron/354th Fighter Group in southeast England during World War II. His plane was shot down on July 17, 1944, over Les Ventes in the Normandy region in Northern France. He deliberately avoided the town's houses and managed to divert his plane to crash into the forest; he lost his life, while causing no victims among the villagers.

== Biography ==
Harris was born on October 14, 1922, in Jackson County, Oklahoma. He was married to Peggy Seale Harris on September 22, 1943 six weeks before he went off to war, and was assigned to the 354th Fighter Group, 355th Fighter Squadron.

== Military service and death ==
He was assigned to the 355th Fighter Squadron/354th Fighter Group in southeast England. He flew a P-51 Mustang as bomber support missions into Germany. Following the success of D-Day his missions changed to ground attack role and fighter sweeps over France. He was successful in his daily missions across the English channel that earned him two Air Medals, with 11 oak leaf clusters and the Distinguished Flying Cross.

During his last mission on July 17, 1944, he was flying his P-51D-5 Mustang as part of a fighter sweep mission over Bureaux, France. During the mission the fighter sortie he was with were engaged by a number of ME-109s and FW-190s, a few miles Southwest of the village of Les Ventes, near Évreux. During the fight, it was reported that Billie Harris had a FW-190 on his tail, which was able to damage his P-51. This caused his P-51 to roll over into a slow dive streaming with white smoke. During this uncontrolled dive, his P-51 was headed towards the village of Les Ventes, he managed to avoid crashing his plane into the town area, maneuvering his plane into the near by forest. The maneuver has been cited with saving many lives.

The French Resistance were the first to get to the downed aircraft, and discovered that Billie Harris was already dead. It landed in trees and was cushioned on impact and thus was not destroyed. His body was not immediately recovered because the German soldiers closed in, the resistance removed his handgun and code book. His ID was stripped by the Germans but he had a patch on his arm that read D. Harris.

== Memorial ==
The Resistance had recovered his body, which they carefully buried, along with other heroes who had lost their lives. Harris was thought to be a Canadian by the town's villagers as they assumed his name was D’Harris and could not clearly identify him as an American soldier, as objects to identify him had been taken by the Germans. The town of Les Ventes honored him as a hero as he had fought to liberate France as well as his sacrifice for their freedom in avoiding the village with his plane on crash impact.

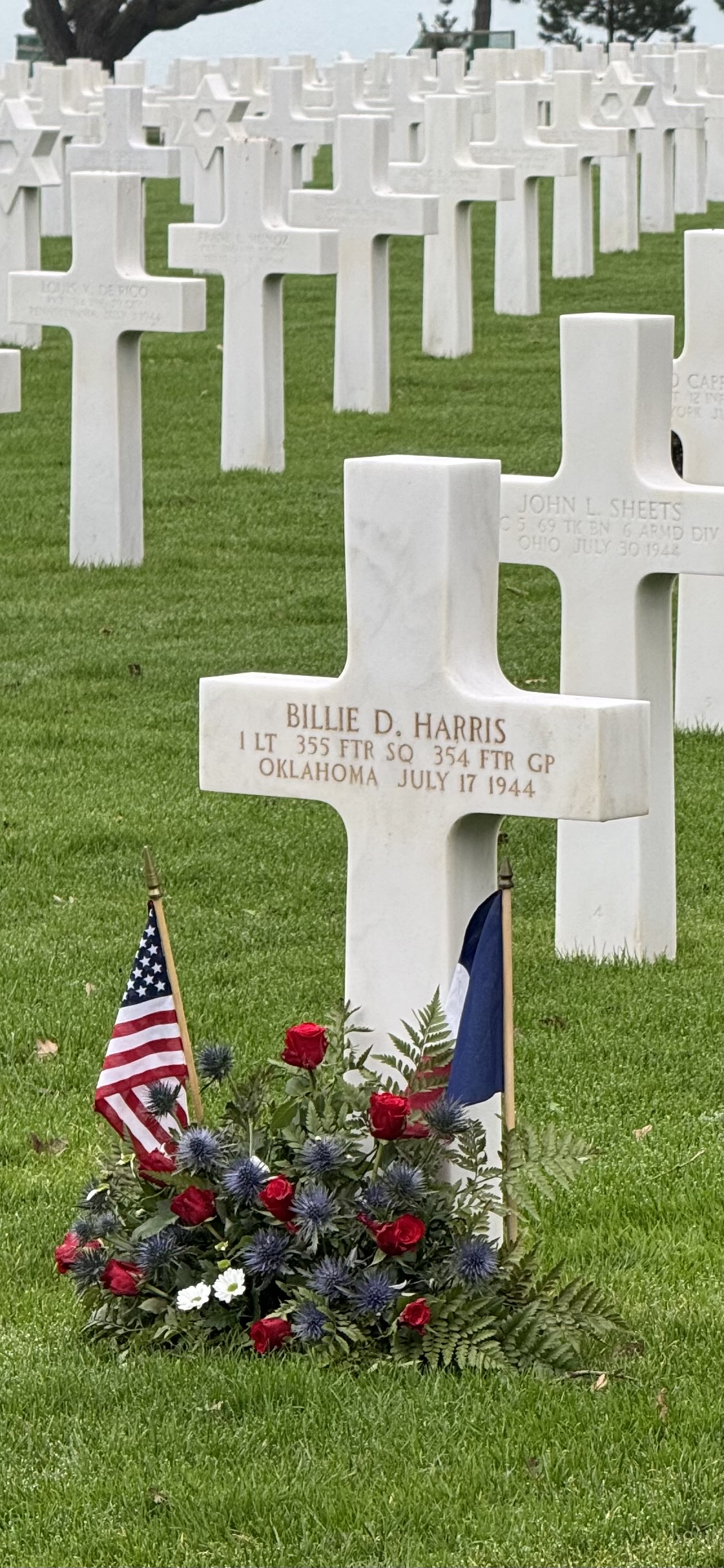
American Cemetery, Normandy, France

It was not until 2005 that Harris' widow, Peggy, learned of his fate and that he was remembered as a hero by the citizens of Les Ventes. He was memorialized at Plot D Row 27 Grave 3, Normandy American Cemetery, Colleville-sur-Mer, France.
