= Billie Jean Theide =

American sculptor and goldsmith (born 1956)

Billie Jean Theide (born 1956) is an American sculptor and goldsmith.

Theide was born in Des Moines, Iowa in 1956. She attended Indiana University, earning an MFA in 1982. Theide is a professor of art at the University of Illinois in Champaign, Illinois.

Her work is included in the collections of the Smithsonian American Art Museum, the Kamm Teapot Foundation, the de Young Museum, San Francisco, and the Nelson-Atkins Museum of Art.
