= Alfred C. Werner =

American football, basketball, soccer, and track coach

Biographical details
- Born: September 24, 1917; Ilion, New York, U.S.
- Died: January 10, 2013 (aged 95); Sun City, Arizona, U.S.

Coaching career (HC unless noted)

Football
- 1941–1942: Allegheny

Basketball
- 1942–1943: Allegheny

Administrative career (AD unless noted)
- 1966–1978: Albany

Head coaching record
- Overall: 2–10 (football); 10–3 (basketball)

Alfred C. Werner (September 24, 1917 – January 10, 2013) was an American football, basketball, soccer, and track coach, physical education professor, and college athletics administrator.

== Biography ==
Werner earned a doctorate in physical education from Springfield College and taught at the University at Albany, SUNY, the State University of New York at Plattsburgh, the United States Military Academy, and Allegheny College.

While at Springfield, Werner competed on the football, basketball, and track and field teams.

== Coaching career ==
Werner was the head football coach at Allegheny College in Meadville, Pennsylvania for the 1941 and 1942 seasons. His coaching record at Allegheny was 2–10. Werner died in Sun City, Arizona in January 2013 at the age of 95.
