= Marek Matlak =

Polish chess player (born 1966)

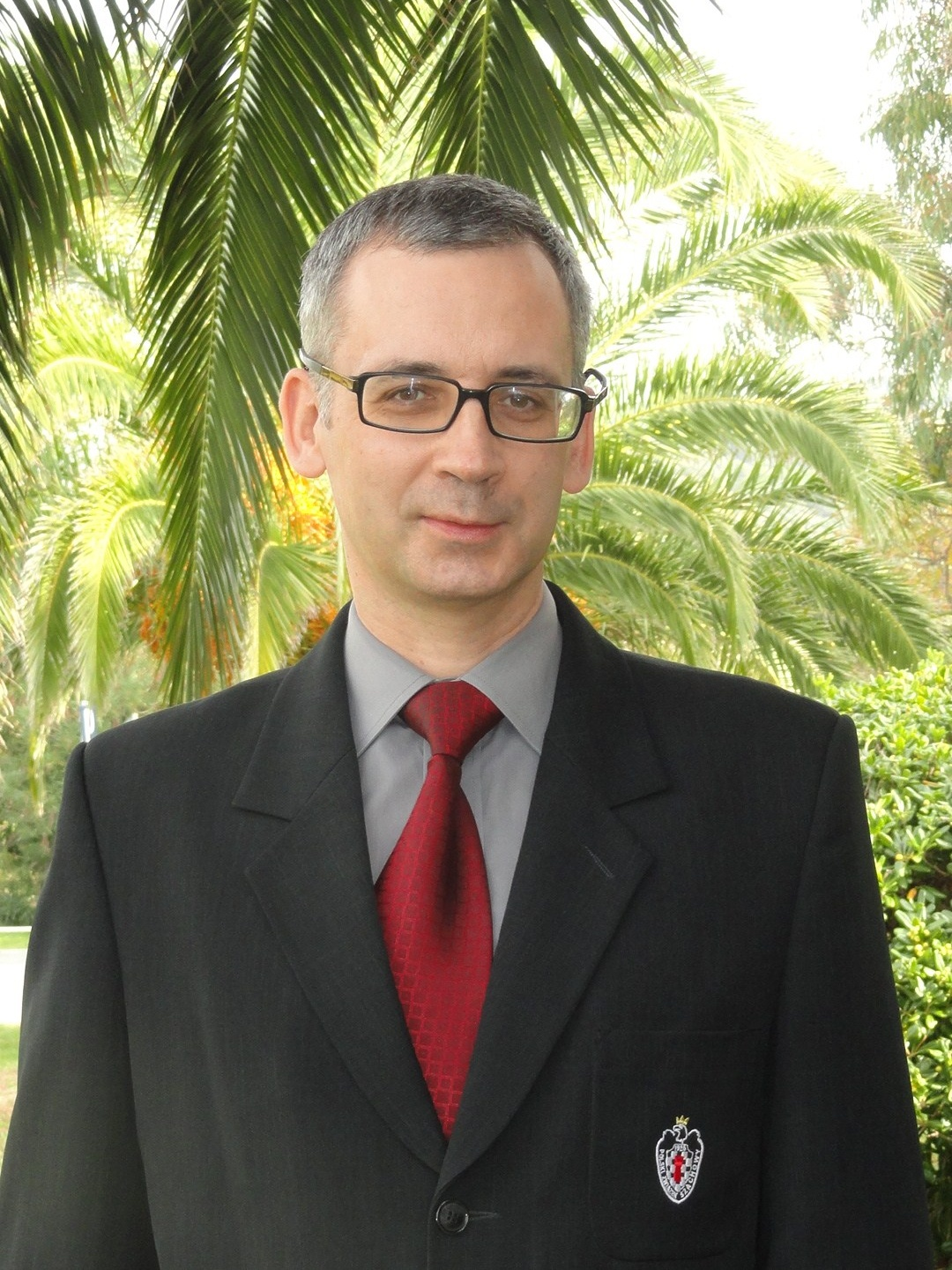
- Marek Matlak in 2011

Personal information
- Born: 21 March 1966 (age 60) Kęty, Poland

Chess career
- Country: Poland
- Title: International Master (1988), ICCF International Master (1995)
- FIDE rating: 2479 (July 2026)
- Peak rating: 2501 (July 2003)

Marek Matlak (born 21 March 1966) is a Polish chess International Master (1988), ICCF International Master (1995), FIDE Senior Trainer (2014), FIDE Arbiter (2009).

== Chess career ==
Marek Matlak started playing chess at the age of 12. In 1986 he won his first title of Polish Champion, winning in Augustów Polish Youth Chess Championship in U23 age group. In 1987 Marek Matlak successfully made his debut in the finals of Polish Chess Championships, taking 4th place in Wrocław. In 1988 he received the title of International Master (IM) after winning the international chess tournament in Bielsko-Biała. In 1992 Marek Matlak won two gold medals in the Polish Rapid Chess Championships in rapid chess and in Polish Blitz Chess Championship. In 1994 Marek Matlak achieved the greatest success on the national arena, sharing the first place in the final of the Polish Chess Championship in Gdańsk. In the play-off match for the gold medal, which took place in Poznań, he had to recognize the superiority of Włodzimierz Schmidt. In 1996 he won (together with Marek Vokáč) an open chess tournament in České Budějovice.

Marek Matlak played for Poland in the Chess Olympiads:

- In 1994, at fourth board in the 31st Chess Olympiad in Moscow (+4, =5, -1).

Marek Matlak played for Poland in the Nordic Chess Cup:

- In 1989, at third board in the 12th Nordic Chess Cup in Aabybro (+3, =4, -0) and won team bronze medal.

Marek Matlak was also successful in correspondence chess, and in 1995 he was awarded the title of International Master of ICCF. He appeared in the final of the XI Olympiad (1992–1997), taking 5th place on the 2nd board (with this result he fulfilled the first grandmaster norm). In July 2006, he had 2637 points on the ICCF rating and ranked 2nd among Polish correspondence chess players.

Marek Matlak reached the highest rating in classical chess on July 1, 2003, with a score of 2501 points, he was ranked 14th among Polish chess players.

== Coaching achievements ==
Marek Matlak has been involved in training work since the late 1980s. Since 1996, he has participated, as a captain and coach of the Poland women's national chess team, in several dozen tournaments of the highest international rank, and the chess players cooperating with him won several dozen medals, including bronze medals at Olympiad in 2002 and four medals at European Team Chess Championships (gold - 2005, silver - 2007, 2011 and bronze - 2013). Many times Marek Matlak was the leading coach at national team training camps and Youth Chess Academy training camps. He is the author of over 70 methodological and training articles, including publishing in the books by Ryszard Bernard "Selected issues of chess theory and practice" (2002-2008) and Wojciech Gryciuk "Learn from masters" (2010). In addition, he published in Polish chess magazines (including Mat, Przegląd Szachowy, Panorama Szachowa, magazine Szachy and Szachista).

He was awarded ten times by the Minister of Sport and Tourism for his outstanding coaching achievements.

In addition to the role of coach and captain of the women's national team, Marek Matlak also acts as a coach and coordinator of the Youth Chess Academy, supervising and coordinating the training of the most talented Polish juniors. In addition, he is the vice-president for youth training in Lubuski Chess Association.
