= Braden Layer =

American football coach (born c. 1990)

Current position
- Title: Head coach
- Team: Allegheny
- Conference: PAC
- Record: 8–22

Biographical details
- Born: c. 1989 (age 36–37); Columbus, Ohio, U.S.
- Education: Denison University (2012); Austin Peay State University (2014)

Playing career
- 2008–2012: Denison
- Positions: Quarterback, wide receiver

Coaching career (HC unless noted)
- 2013: Austin Peay (GA)
- 2014–2015: Denison (WR)
- 2016: Sewanee (WR)
- 2017–2018: Allegheny (OC/QB)
- 2019–2021: Bowdoin (OC/QB)
- 2022: Dayton (QB)
- 2023–present: Allegheny

Head coaching record
- Overall: 8–22

Braden Layer (born c. 1989) is an American college football coach. He is the head football coach for Allegheny College, a position he has held since 2023. He also coached for Austin Peay, Denison, Sewanee, Bowdoin, and Dayton. He played college football for Denison as a quarterback and wide receiver.

== Head coaching record ==
Year	Team	Overall	Conference	Standing	Bowl/playoffs
Allegheny Gators (Presidents' Athletic Conference) (2023–present)
2023	Allegheny	3–7	3–7	T–7th	
2024	Allegheny	1–9	1–9	T–9th	
2025	Allegheny	4–6	4–4	T–5th	
2026	Allegheny	0–0	0–0		
Allegheny:		8–22	8–20		
Total:		8–22			
