= Edward N. Eisenberg =

American football coach

Biographical details
- Born: July 5, 1879; Norristown, Pennsylvania, U.S.
- Died: April 14, 1951 (aged 71); Detroit, Michigan, U.S.
- Education: Lafayette College

Coaching career (HC unless noted)
- 1900: Lafayette (assistant)
- 1901: Allegheny

Head coaching record
- Overall: 6–5–1

Edward Norman Eisenberg (July 5, 1879 – April 14, 1951) was an American college football coach. He served as the head football coach at Allegheny College in Meadville, Pennsylvania, for one season, in 1901, compiling a record of 6–5–1.

Eisenberg attended Lafayette College, from which he graduated in 1901 with a Bachelor of Science degree. He assisted Samuel B. Newton in coaching the 1900 Lafayette football team. A native of Norristown, Pennsylvania, Eisenberg lived in Detroit for 45 years, where was a sales manager for Creditors Service. He died of a cerebral hemorrhage, on April 14, 1951, at his home in the Detroit's Parkstone Apartments.

== Head coaching record ==
=== Football ===
Year	Team	Overall	Conference	Standing	Bowl/playoffs
Allegheny Gators (Independent) (1901)
1901	Allegheny	6–5–1			
Allegheny:		6–5–1			
Total:		6–5–1			
