= Vilém Heckel =

Personal information
- Born: May 21, 1918 Plzeň, Czech Republic
- Died: May 31, 1970 (aged 52) Huascarán, Peru

Vilém Heckel (21 May 1918 – 31 May 1970) was a Czech photographer. He devoted himself mainly to landscape photography, with special focus on the photography of mountains. In 1970, he died at Huascarán, Peru. Vilém Heckel was one of the founders of the genre of industrial and promotional photography in Czechoslovakia.

== Life ==
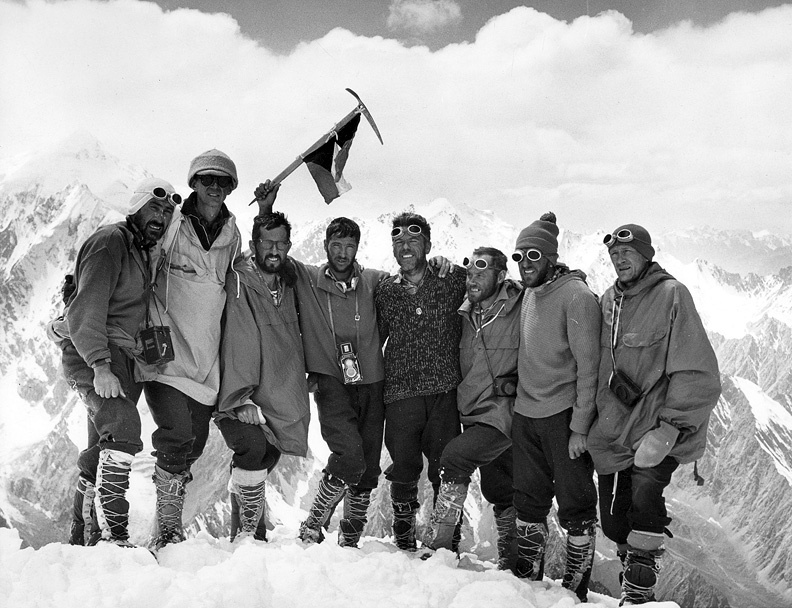
First Czechoslovak expedition to Hindu Kush (1965)

Heckel studied to be a photographer in the portrait atelier of Josef Chmelík in Plzeň, his home city. His artistic beginnings were focused on industrial photography. From 1937 to 1939, he was an employee of the Prague company Indusfoto, but later he became interested in theatre photography and photojournalism. He changed his place of work to the ateliers of Karel Drbohlav and Illek and Paul. He also spent a part of his early career as a photographer in Zbrojovka Brno. In 1949 he became a member of the Svaz československých výtvarných umělců (Union of Czechoslovak Visual Artists).

In the 1950s, Heckel began to work as a freelance photographer. In 1956, he published his first book: Naše hory ("Our Mountains"). At the same time, he became familiar with mountaineering, later he became a professional mountaineer. In 1955 he attended the workshop in High Tatras, where he has made his first photo cycle with mountain themes. The membership in the Union of Czechoslovak Visual Artists enabled him to participate many mountain expeditions and visit countries inaccessible for Czechoslovak citizens. As a member of expeditions, Heckel visited Kavkaz, Afghanistan and Pakistan. Gradually he became known in the community of mountaineers as a photographer with excellent skills in the extreme conditions of mountain climbing.

In 1970, a group of mountain climbers together with Heckel planned to visit Alaska. Their intention was thwarted by the Czechoslovak communist regime. Following the suppression of the Prague Spring in 1968, it was almost impossible to travel to Western countries. The group changed their plan and decided to climb the peaks in the Peruvian Cordillera Blanca. Heckel and several of his colleagues planned to leave the expedition and focus more on studying and documenting of Peruvian culture. However, after the death of one of the leaders of the expedition, climber Ivan Bortel, they were forced to stay in the camp with the rest of the expedition. On 1 June 1970, Heckel and his colleagues intended to separate from the rest of the group. Coincidentally, the avalanche caused by Great Peruvian earthquake buried their camp under Huascarán on 31 May 1970, the day before their departure. All of the members of the expedition died.

=== Legacy ===
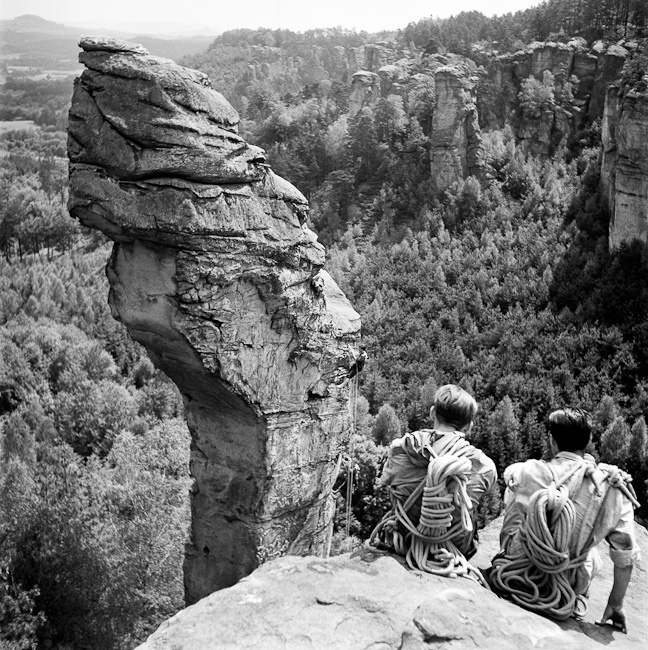
Příhrazy Rocks (part of the Bohemian Paradise), a sandstone tower named Kobyla (c. 1959)

Vilém Heckel is important in the history of Czech photography, particularly because of his portraits of the Czech landscape. He mainly photographed the nature and mountains, but later he focused also on urban photography. In his photo cycles he managed to depict an original picture of Czech landscape, its spirit and uniqueness. His works often include human elements; he attempted to picture not only the mountains, but also his fellows in the danger of mountain climbing sport.

Although he was initially an industrial photographer, today he is considered mainly as a photographer of mountains.

The annual Czech photographic competition and exhibit on the subject of man, nature and the environment is named after him Vilém Heckel Peaks (Czech: Štíty Viléma Heckela), as is Heckelova Street in Prague-Koloděje.

== Works ==
- Naše hory, 1956
- Království slunce a ledu, 1960
- Hory a lidé, 1964 (together with writer Ota Pavel)
- Expedice Kavkaz, 1965
- Hindúkuš, 1967
- Krásy Československa, 1968
- Schody pod vesmír, 1970
