= Mark Matlak =

American football and baseball coach (born 1956)

Biographical details
- Born: May 9, 1956 (age 70)

Playing career

Football
- 1974–1977: Allegheny
- Position: Fullback

Coaching career (HC unless noted)

Football
- 1978–1982: Allegheny (assistant)
- 1983–1988: New Hampshire (assistant)
- 1989–2001: New Hampshire (DC)
- 2002–2015: Allegheny

Baseball
- 1979–1982: Allegheny

Head coaching record
- Overall: 62–79 (football); 36–50 (baseball)
- Tournaments: 0–1 (NCAA D-III playoffs)

Accomplishments and honors

Championships
- Football; 1 NCAC (2003)

Mark Matlak (born May 9, 1956) is an American former college football and college baseball coach. He served as the head football coach at Allegheny College from 2002 to 2015, compiling a record of 62–79. Matlak was also the head baseball coach at Allegheny from 1979 to 1982, tallying a mark of 36–50.

== Head coaching record ==
=== Football ===
Year	Team	Overall	Conference	Standing	Bowl/playoffs
Allegheny Gators (North Coast Athletic Conference) (2002–2015)
2002	Allegheny	5–5	4–3	T–4th	
2003	Allegheny	7–4	7–0	1st	L NCAA Division III First Round
2004	Allegheny	5–5	4–3	T–4th	
2005	Allegheny	3–7	3–4	T–5th	
2006	Allegheny	6–4	4–3	T–4th	
2007	Allegheny	5–5	3–4	T–6th	
2008	Allegheny	5–5	4–3	T–3rd	
2009	Allegheny	8–2	5–2	3rd	
2010	Allegheny	7–3	4–2	T–3rd	
2011	Allegheny	5–5	3–3	T–4th	
2012	Allegheny	5–5	4–3	T–5th	
2013	Allegheny	0–10	0–9	10th	
2014	Allegheny	1–9	1–8	T–9th	
2015	Allegheny	0–10	0–9	10th	
Allegheny:		62–79	46–57		
Total:		62–79			
National championship Conference title Conference division title or championship game berth
