= Alonzo G. Brown =

American football coach

Coaching career (HC unless noted)
- 1899: Allegheny

Head coaching record
- Overall: 7–2–2

Alonzo G. Brown was American college football coach. He served as the head football coach at Allegheny College in Meadville, Pennsylvania for one season, in 1899, compiling a record of 7–2–2.

== Head coaching record ==
Year	Team	Overall	Conference	Standing	Bowl/playoffs
Allegheny Gators (Independent) (1899)
1899	Allegheny	7–2–2			
Allegheny:		7–2–2			
Total:		7–2–2			
