= Vilhjálmur Árnason (professor) =

Icelandic philosopher (born 1953)

Vilhjálmur Árnason (born in Neskaupstaður, Iceland 1953) is professor of philosophy at the University of Iceland. Internationally, he is best known for his research on ethical aspects of controversial genetic research in Iceland by deCODE Genetics.

== Books ==
- Hugsmíðar: Um siðferði, stjórnmál og samfélag [Fantasies: On Ethics, Politics and Sociecty], 2014
- With Ástríður Stefánsdóttir Sjálfræði og aldraðir í ljósi íslenskra aðstæðna [Autonomy and Senior Citizens in Light of their Situation in Icelandic], (2004)
- Broddflugur: Siðferðilegar ádeilur og samfélagsgagnrýni [Gadflies: Moral and Social Criticisms], (1997)
- Siðfræði lífs og dauða [Ethics of Life and Death], (1993, 2nd ed. 2003. German transl. 2005: Dialog und Menschenwürde. Ethik im Gesundheitswesen')
- Þættir úr sögu siðfræðinnar [Themes From the History of Moral Philosophy], (1990)
- Siðfræði heilbrigðisþjónustu [Ethics in Health Care], (1990)
