= Fred E. Heckel =

American football coach

Playing career
- 1896–1898: Penn State
- Position: Quarterback

Coaching career (HC unless noted)
- 1900: Allegheny
- 1910: Penn State (assistant)

Head coaching record
- Overall: 5–3

Fred E. Heckel was American college football player coach. He served as the head football coach at Allegheny College in Meadville, Pennsylvania for one season, in 1900, compiling a record of 5–3.

Heckel attended high school in Bradford, Pennsylvania, where he was captain of the football team, playing as a halfback. He then went to Pennsylvania State College—now known as Pennsylvania State University, where he played football from 1896 to 1898 as a quarterback. Heckel returned to Penn State in 1910 as an assistant coach for the football team.

== Head coaching record ==
Year	Team	Overall	Conference	Standing	Bowl/playoffs
Allegheny Gators (Independent) (1900)
1900	Allegheny	5–3			
Allegheny:		5–3			
Total:		5–3			
