= Billie J. Farrell =

US Navy captain (born 1980s)

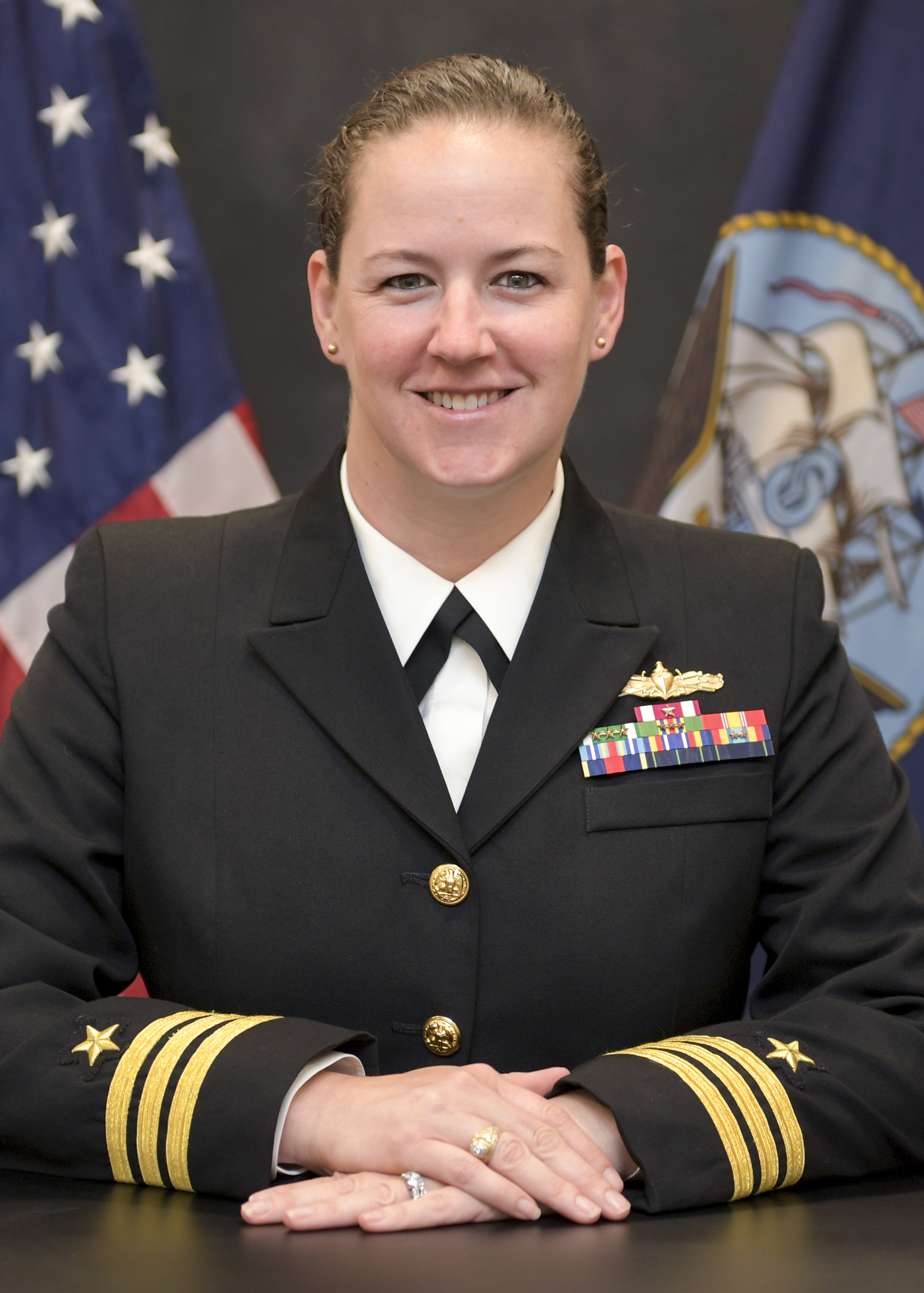
- Commander Farrell (May 2020)
- Born: 1982/1983 (age 43–44)
- Education: US Naval Academy (BS); University of Arkansas (MS)
- Occupation: Sailor
- Spouse: Paul Farrell
- Children: 2
- Military career
- Branch: United States Navy
- Years: 2004–present
- Rank: Commander
- Units: USS Vella Gulf; USS San Jacinto; COMNAVSURFLANT; USS Vicksburg
- Commands: USS Constitution

Billie J. Farrell (born 1982/1983) is an officer in the United States Navy. In 2022, she became the first woman to command USS Constitution.

== Personal life ==
Born in 1982 or 1983, Billie J. Farrell hails from Paducah, Kentucky. She graduated from the United States Naval Academy in 2004 with a Bachelor of Science in political science, and has a 2009 Master of Science in operations management from the University of Arkansas. As of January 2022, Farrell and her husband, fellow naval officer Paul Farrell, lived in Charlestown, Boston with their two children aged six and three.

== US Navy ==
Farrell's first Navy assignment was aboard USS Vella Gulf (CG-72), first as electrical officer and then as navigator. She was then assigned to Millington, Tennessee before reporting to USS San Jacinto (CG-56) as weapons officer and then combat systems officer. Following her return to the US Naval Academy as the deputy director for professional development, Farrell was assigned to the Commander, Naval Surface Force Atlantic as the deputy N3. She next served as the executive officer of USS Vicksburg (CG-69).

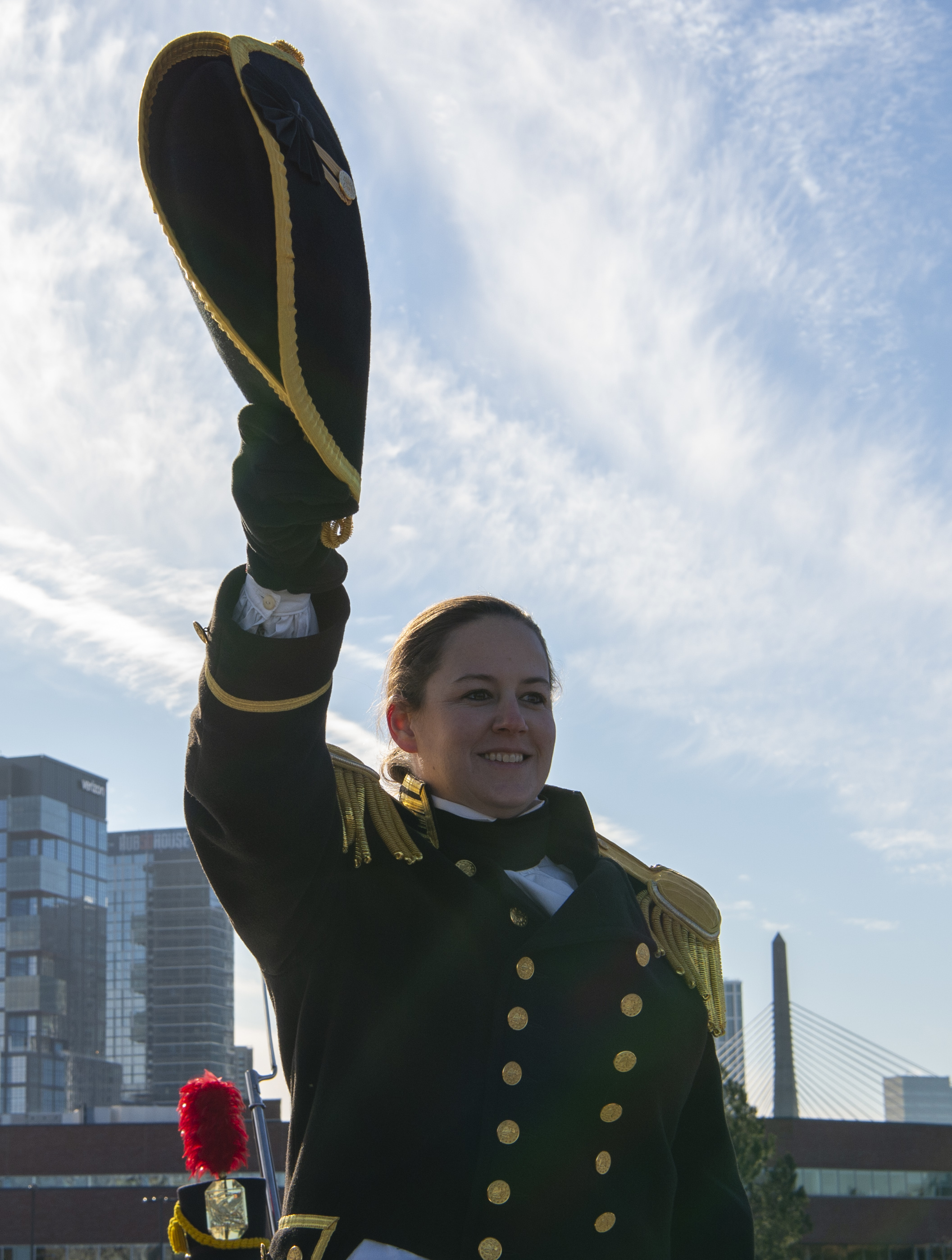
Commander Farrell in her chronistic Constitution uniform (January 2022)

On 21 January 2022, Commander Farrell was assigned to USS Constitution for a two-year assignment as the first woman commanding officer in the ship's 224-year history. She relinquished command of Constitution to Commander Crystal L. Schaefer on 21 June 2024.

As of February 2021, Farrell had received two Meritorious Service Medals, four Navy and Marine Corps Commendation Medals, and three Meritorious Unit Commendations.
