= Willy (given name) =

Willy or Willie is a masculine, male given name, often a diminutive form of William or Wilhelm, and occasionally a nickname. It may refer to:

== People ==
=== Given name or nickname ===
- Willie Allen (basketball) (born 1949), American basketball player and director of the Growing Power urban farming program
- Willie Allen (racing driver) (born 1980), American racing driver
- Willie Anderson (disambiguation)
- Willie Apiata (born 1972), New Zealand Army soldier, the only recipient of the Victoria Cross for New Zealand
- Willie (footballer) (born 1993), Brazilian footballer Willie Hortencio Barbosa
- Willy Böckl (1893–1975), Austrian world champion figure skater
- Willy Bocklant (1941–1985), Belgian road racing cyclist
- Willy Bogner Sr. (1909–1977), German Nordic skier
- Willy Bogner Jr. (born 1942), German fashion designer and alpine skier
- Willie Bosket (born 1962), an American convicted murderer whose numerous crimes committed as a minor led to a change in New York state law
- Willy Brandt (1913–1992), 4th chancellor of West Germany, originally a pseudonym of Herbert Frahm
- Willie Brown (disambiguation)
- Willy Busch (1907–1982), German footballer
- Willy Caballero (born 1981), Argentina football goalkeeper
- Willie Cauley-Stein (born 1993), American basketball player
- Willy Chavarria (born 1967), an American fashion designer
- Willy Claes (born 1938), Belgian former politician and eighth Secretary General of NATO
- Willie Clancy (hurler) (1906–1967), Irish hurler
- Willie Clancy (musician) (1918–1973), Irish uilleann piper
- Willie Colón (1950–2026), American salsa musician and social activist
- Willie Colon (American football) (born 1983), American football player
- Wee Willie Davis (1906–1981), American actor and professional wrestler
- Willie Davis (baseball) (1940–2010), American baseball player
- Willie Davis (basketball) (1940–2010), American basketball player
- Willie Davis (defensive end) (1934–2020), American football player
- Willie Davis (wide receiver) (born 1967), American football player
- Willy De Clercq (1927–2011), Belgian politician, deputy prime minister and minister of finance
- Willie Dixon (1915–1992), American blues double-bassist, vocalist, songwriter, arranger and record producer
- Willie Drew, American football player
- Willy Eisenhart (1946–1995), American writer on art
- Willie Evans (disambiguation)
- Willie Christine King Farris (1927–2023), older sister of Martin Luther King Jr.
- Willy Fitz (1918–1993), Austrian football player and coach
- Willy Gamage, Sri Lankan politician
- Willie Gault (born 1960), American football player and sprinter
- Willie Gay (born 1998), American football player
- Willie Geist (born 1975), American television personality
- Willie Stevenson Glanton (1922–2017), American politician
- Willy Goldberger (1898–1960s), German-Spanish cinematographer
- Willie Green (born 1981), American basketball player
- Willie Green (American football) (born 1966), American football player
- Willie Harris (born 1978), American baseball player
- Willie Harvey Jr. (born 1996), American football player
- Willie Hector (born 1939), American football player
- Willy van Hemert (1912–1993), Dutch actor, theatre and television director and songwriter
- Willie Hernández (1954–2023), Puerto Rican baseball pitcher
- Willy Hernangómez (born 1994), Spanish basketball player
- Willy Hess (composer) (1906–1997), Swiss musicologist, composer and Beethoven scholar
- Willy Hess (violinist) (1859–1939), German violinist and violin teacher
- Willie Heston (1878–1963), American football player
- William Higinbotham (1910–1994), American physicist and anti-nuclear proliferation activist
- Willie Horton (born 1951), an American convicted murderer whose crimes during a furlough were a significant issue in the 1988 US presidential campaign
- Willie Horton (baseball) (born 1942), American former baseball player
- Willy In 't Ven (born 1943), Belgian former road racing cyclist
- Willie Ito (born 1934), American animator
- Willy Jäggi (1906–1968), Swiss footballer
- Willy F. James Jr. (1920–1945), African-American United States Army soldier posthumously awarded the Medal of Honor
- Willie Johnson (disambiguation)
- Willie Jones (disambiguation)
- Willy Kan (1978–1999), female apprentice jockey from Hong Kong
- Willy von Känel (1909–1991), Swiss footballer
- Willy Kanis (born 1984), Dutch female racing cyclist
- Willie Otey Kay (1894–1992), American dressmaker
- Willy van de Kerkhof (born 1951), Dutch footballer
- Willy Kernen (1929–2009), Swiss footballer
- Willy Cheruiyot Kipkirui (born 1974), Kenyan long-distance runner
- Willy Komen (born 1987), Kenyan middle-distance runner
- Willy Koppen (1924–2002), Dutch motorcycle racer, one of the first women participating at international motor races during the nineteen fifties
- Willie Lanier (born 1945), American football player
- Wilfrid Laurier (1841–1919), 7th Prime Minister of Canada
- Willy Ley (1906–1969), German science writer, spaceflight advocate and historian of science
- Willie Limond (1979–2024), Scottish boxer
- William Wallace Lincoln (1850–1862), third son of President Abraham Lincoln
- Willie Kirkpatrick Lindsay (1875–1954), American educator and temperance activist
- Willy Lindström (born 1951), Swedish ice hockey player
- Willy Lust (born 1932), Dutch multi-sport track-and-field athlete
- Willie Person Mangum (1792–1861), American politician
- Willie Martinez (disambiguation)
- Willie Mays (1931–2024), American baseball player
- Willie John McBride (born 1940), Northern Irish former rugby union footballer who played as a lock for Ireland and the British and Irish Lions
- Willie McCovey (1938–2018), American baseball player
- Willie McGee (born 1958), American former baseball player
- Willy McIntosh (born 1970), Thai actor, model and TV producer
- Willie McKenna (1889–1958), Scottish footballer
- Willy Messerschmitt (1898–1978), German aircraft designer and manufacturer
- Willie Mitchell (disambiguation)
- Willie Mosconi (1913–1993), American pool player
- Willie Moretti (1894–1951), Italian-American mobster
- Willy Mutunga (born 1947), Kenyan lawyer, reformer and former Chief Justice of Kenya
- Willie Naulls (1934–2018), American basketball player
- Willie Nelson (born 1933), American country singer-songwriter, author, poet, actor, and activist
- Willy Van Neste (born 1944), Belgian retired road racing cyclist
- Willie Norwood (disambiguation)
- Guillermo "Willy" Oddó (1943–1991), Chilean musician
- Willie Ong (born 1963) Filipino cardiologist, media personality and politician
- Willie O'Ree (born 1935), the first black player in the National Hockey League
- Willie Park Sr. (1833–1903), Scottish golfer
- Willie Park Jr. (1864–1925), American golfer and golf course architect, son of the above
- Willy Pogany (1882–1955), Hungarian illustrator of children's and other books
- Willie Randolph (born 1954), American former baseball player, coach and manager
- Willie Revillame (born 1961), Filipino television host, actor and recording artist
- Willy Rizzo (1928–2013), Italian photographer and designer
- Willie Robertson (born 1972), American TV personality, businessman, outdoorsman, hunter and author best known for appearing on the reality TV series Duck Dynasty
- Willy Røgeberg (1905–1969), Norwegian rifle shooter and 1936 Olympic champion
- Willy Rohr (1877–1930), German Army World War I officer and tactical innovator
- Willy Ronis (1910–2009), French photographer
- Willie Rushton (1937–1996), English cartoonist, comedian, actor and performer
- Willy Russell (born 1947), English dramatist, lyricist and composer
- Willy Sagnol (born 1977), French former football player and manager
- Willy Schäfer (actor) (1933–2011), German television actor
- Willy Schäfer (handballer) (1913–1980), Swiss Olympic field handball player
- Willy Schärer (1903–1982), Swiss middle-distance runner
- Willie Scott (American football) (1959–2021), an American retired National Football League player
- Willie Sims (1958–2022), American-Israeli basketball player
- Willy Sluiter (1873–1949), Dutch painter
- Willie "The Lion" Smith (1897–1973), American jazz pianist
- Willie Smith (alto saxophonist) (1910–1967), jazz alto saxophonist
- Willie "Big Eyes" Smith (1936–2011), American blues singer, harmonica player and drummer
- Willie Smith (offensive tackle, born 1937) (born 1937), American former football player
- Willie Smith (tight end) (born 1964), American former football player
- Willie Smith (offensive tackle, born 1986) (born 1986), American former football player
- Willy Spühler (1902–1990), Swiss politician
- Willie Stargell (1940–2001), American baseball player
- Willibald Stejskal, Austrian football player (1914–1923) and manager (1924–1953)
- Willy Stöwer (1864–1931), German artist, illustrator and author
- Willie Sutton (1901–1980), American bank robber
- Willie Taggart (born 1976), American college football coach
- Willy Taveras (born 1981), former Major League Baseball player from the Dominican Republic
- Willy Teirlinck (born 1948), Belgian retired road cyclist
- Willie Thorne (1954–2020), English snooker player and sports commentator
- Willie Tonga (born 1983), Australian Rugby League player
- Willy Tröger (1928–2004), German footballer
- Willy Vanden Berghen (1939–2022), Belgian retired road bicycle racer
- Willy Vandersteen (1913–1990), Belgian creator of comic books
- Willie Weeks (born 1947), American bass guitarist
- Willie Williams (disambiguation)
- Willie Wolfe (1951–1974), one of the founding members of the Symbionese Liberation Army terrorist group
- Willie Wolfgramm (born 1970), Tongan rugby league player
- Willy Wolterstorff (1864–1943), German herpetologist and palaeontologist
- Willie Wood (disambiguation)
- Willie Woodburn (1919–2001), Scottish footballer
- Willy Workman (born 1990), American-Israeli basketball player for Hapoel Jerusalem in the Israeli Basketball Premier League
- Willie Worsley (born 1945), American basketball player
- Willie Wright (disambiguation), multiple people
- Willie Young (disambiguation), multiple people

=== Stage name, pen name, ring name or nom de guerre ===
- Boxcar Willie (1931–1999), American country music singer
- Willie Aames (born 1960), American actor, television director, and screenwriter
- Willy Corsari, Dutch singer and author Wilhelmina Angela Schmidt (1897–1998)
- Willy DeVille, American singer and songwriter William Paul Borsey, Jr. (1950–2009)
- Willy Moon (born 1989), birth name William George Sinclair, New Zealand-born singer and producer
- Willie Nile (born 1948), birth name Robert Anthony Noonan, American folk and rock singer and songwriter
- Willie Pep, American boxer Guglielmo Papaleo (1922–2006)
- Henry Gauthier-Villars (1859–1931), French fin-de-siecle writer and music critic, pen name Willy
- Simeon Cuba Sarabia or Willy (1935–1967), Bolivian trade unionist and guerrilla under Che Guevara

== Dogs ==
- Willie (1942–1955), General George Patton's dog
- Araki Fabulous Willy (2001–2008), champion Tibetan Terrier
- Wheely Willy (1991–2009), Californian paraplegic chihuahua

== Fictional characters ==
- Chilly Willy, a cartoon character
- Willy Armitage, strongman and IMF agent in the TV series Mission: Impossible
- Willy Fog, protagonist in the Spanish animated series Around the World with Willy Fog
- Willy Loman, protagonist of the play Death of a Salesman by Arthur Miller
- Willie Lumpkin, supporting character in Marvel Comics
- Willy Mackey, a villain from Double Dragon
- Willy Roper, in the British soap opera EastEnders
- Captain Willy Schultz, a comic book World War II soldier
- Wilhelmina "Willie" Scott, the female lead character in the film Indiana Jones and the Temple of Doom
- Willie Stark, central character of the novel All the King's Men by Robert Penn Warren
- Willy Wonka, in Roald Dahl's children's novels and film adaptations thereof, owner of the chocolate factory
- Groundskeeper Willie, a recurring character on the television series The Simpsons
- Wrong Way Willie, a recurring character in the adventures of Billy Jo Jive, an animated segment featured on Sesame Street in the late 1970s.
- Willy (EastEnders), a fictional dog
- Willy, a fictional killer whale in the films Free Willy, Free Willy 2: The Adventure Home, Free Willy 3: The Rescue, and Free Willy (TV series)
- Willy, a fictional sperm in the book Where Willy Went
- Willy, a sailor from Wigan in the Captain Pugwash series of British children's comic strips and books
- Willy, main character in Willy the Sparrow.
- Willie the Giant, a character in Mickey and the Beanstalk
- Willie, a whale in the Make Mine Music segment Willie the Whale Who Wanted to Sing at the Met
- Willie the Wildcat (Kansas State), mascot of the Kansas State University Wildcats
- Willie the Wildcat (Northwestern), the mascot of the Northwestern University Wildcats
- Willie and Joe, comics characters created by Bill Mauldin
- King Willie, main villain in Predator 2
- Uncle Willy, a character in the 1995 American horror comedy movie Demon Knight
- Willie, a character from Netflix's Julie and the Phantoms.
- Willie, a character from Sabritas.

== See also ==
- Wili (disambiguation), includes a list of people with the name Wili
- Willi, a given name
- Willye, given name
- William (name)
- Willies (disambiguation), includes a list of people with the name Willies
