= Guards Cavalry Rifle Division =

Prussian Army unit

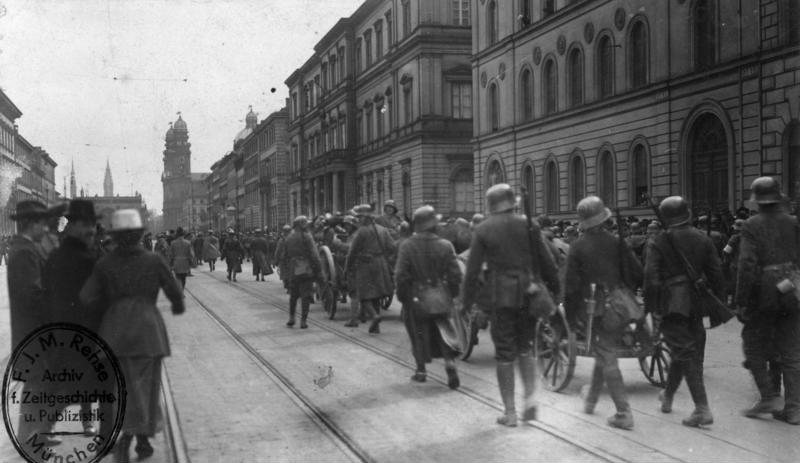
Men of the Division entering Munich after crushing the Bavarian Soviet Republic

The Guards Cavalry Rifle Division (German; Garde-Kavallerie-Schützen-Division) was a large unit of the Prussian Army formed in the spring of 1918. During the German revolution of 1918–1919, one of the largest volunteer units of the period of upheaval emerged from it, with a strength of up to 40,000 men.

From December 1918 onwards, the Division took a large part in suppressing revolutionary uprisings, and members of it murdered Karl Liebknecht and Rosa Luxemburg.

== History ==
The Guards Cavalry Rifle Division was formed in March 1918 at the Zossen Military Training Area in Brandenburg, from the Guards Cavalry Division, which had come home from the Eastern Front, and from elements of other divisions. The Division's commander was Lieutenant General Heinrich von Hofmann, and its first general staff officer was Captain Waldemar Pabst. Major Willy Rohr and his 5th Assault Battalion were ordered to Maubeuge from the German spring offensive to train the division for the Western Front. As part of this training, a large-scale exercise was planned for the whole division. Among those observing this exercise were Emperor Charles I of Austria, Crown Prince Wilhelm of Prussia, Paul von Hindenburg, and Erich Ludendorff of the Supreme Army Command; Generals Friedrich Sixt von Armin, Fritz von Loßberg, and Oskar von Hutier. To conclude the exercise, Hindenburg inspected the division on 23 May.

The division was posted to the Western Front in Champagne region at the end of May 1918. From 15 July, it fought in the Second Battle of the Marne, and between 17 August and 4 September it took part in the defensive battle between the River Oise and the River Aisne. In October 1918, the division covered the retreat of the 1st Army.

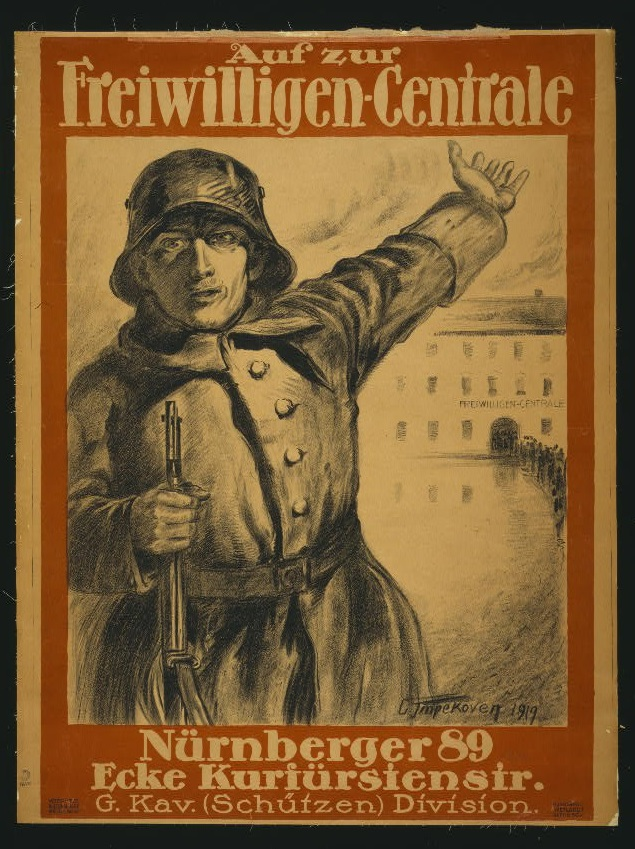
A recruiting poster for the division

American Expeditionary Forces intelligence officers rated the division as second-class (of four classes) and reported that it was one of the General Headquarters attack divisions, held under the direct control of the Supreme Army Command. After the failure of the July 1918 offensive east of Rheims, the division was always on the defensive.

The regiments returned to Berlin soon after the Armistice of 11 November 1918, and the division's first major engagement on German soil came during the 1918 Christmas crisis. The Volksmarinedivision (People's Navy Division), which was occupying the Berlin Palace and the Neuer Marstall (New Stables), had mutinied, demanding its overdue wages and seeking to stop a plan to downsize it. Under the command of General Arnold Lequis, the Guards Cavalry Rifle Division and other regular troops were ordered to drive the Volksmarinedivision out of its positions, but failed. Soon after this, the Division became well-known and indeed infamous for its part in suppressing the Spartacist uprising and for the murders of Karl Liebknecht and Rosa Luxemburg in January 1919. In April 1919, the Guards Cavalry Rifle Division, together with the Marine Division under Major General Paul von Lettow-Vorbeck, formed the Guards Cavalry Rifle Corps, also commanded by Hofmann. In May 1919, it was part of the force led by Major General Heinrich Deetjen which crushed the Bavarian Soviet Republic. Formally, the unit remained a regular unit of the German Army until it was incorporated into the Provisional Reichswehr of the Weimar Republic in July 1919, but due to the heavy recruitment of volunteers and the incorporation of numerous volunteer units from demobilized troops, it quickly took on the character of a Freikorps (Volunteer Corps).

== Units ==
At the time of the Armistice of November 1918, the British War Office reported the structure of the Guards Cavalry Rifle Division to be as follows:

- 5th Landwehr Brigade
  - 11th Cavalry Rifle Command
    - Prussian Guards Cuirassiers
    - 1st (Silesian) Life Cuirassiers "Great Elector"
    - 8th (2nd Silesian) Dragoons "King Frederick III"
  - 14th Cavalry Rifle Command
    - 4th (1st Silesian) Hussars "von Schill"
    - 11th (2nd Westphalian) Hussars
    - 5th (Westphalian) Uhlans
  - 38th Cavalry Rifle Command
    - 4th (Westphalian) Cuirassiers "von Driesen"
    - 2nd Mounted Rifles
    - 6th Mounted Rifles
- 1st Guard MG Detachment
- 1st Squadron, 5th Mounted Rifles (mounted cavalry)
- 132nd Artillery Command
  - 3rd Guards Field Artillery
  - 722nd Light Ammunition Column
  - 852nd Light Ammunition Column
  - 1135th Light Ammunition Column
- 412th Pioneer Battalion
  - 2nd Ersatz Company, 18th Pioneer Battalion
  - 307th Pioneer Company
- 226th Signal Command
  - 226th Telephone Detachment
  - 183rd Wireless Detachment
- Medical and Veterinary
  - 257th Ambulance Company
  - 642nd Ambulance Company
  - 1st Field Hospital
  - 302nd Field Hospital
  - 262nd Vet. Hospital
- Train
  - 636th Motor Transport Column
