= Willy =

Willy or Willie may refer to:

== Names ==
- Willy (given name), a masculine given name or nickname
- Willy (surname), a list of people with the surname Willy or Willie

== Music ==
- Willie – Before His Time, a 1977 album by country singer Willie Nelson
- "Willy", a song by Joni Mitchell from Ladies of the Canyon
- "Willie", a 2006 song by Cat Power from The Greatest

== Other uses ==
- slang for the penis
- Willy (TV series), an American situation comedy
- Willy (textile machine)
- SS Willy, a Dutch cargo ship in service from 1938 to 1939
- Willie, Georgia, a community in the United States
- Willie Lake, a lake in Minnesota
- Willie: An Autobiography, an autobiography by Willie Nelson with the assistance of Bud Shrake

== See also ==
- "Willy-willy", Australian name for a dust devil wind phenomenon
- Wili (disambiguation)
- Willys, an American automobile brand name, noted for its design of the Jeep
  - John Willys, (1873–1935), founder of Willys automobile company
- Willies (disambiguation)
- William Lee (disambiguation), including Will Lee
- Billy (disambiguation)
