= Assault Battalion No. 5 (Rohr) =

Experimental infantry unit of the German Army during World War I

Assault (Note: The German word Sturm can mean both "storm" and "assault," the latter of which is implied in a military context. English-language publications, however, often erroneously translate Sturm literally to "storm," so the terms are sometimes used interchangeably.) Battalion Number 5 (Rohr)
- Sturm-Bataillon Nr. 5 (Rohr)
- Headquarters identification flag of Assault Battalion No. 5 (Rohr)
- Active: 1915–1918
- Country: German Empire
- Branch: Imperial German Army
- Type: Battalion (at height)
- Role: Close-quarters combat, assault
- Size: 628 (at foundation)
- March: "Güt Sturm"
- Engagements: Battle of Verdun; Spring Offensive; Meuse-Argonne Offensive

Commanders
- Notable commanders: Hauptmann Willy Rohr

Assault Battalion No. 5 (Rohr) (German: Sturm-Bataillon Nr. 5 or 5. Sturm-Bataillon (Rohr)), (German pronunciation: [ʃtʊrm batali̯oːn nʊmɐ fʏnf ʁoːɐ̯]) was an experimental infantry battalion of the Imperial German Army during World War I. Under command of its namesake, Hauptmann Willy Rohr, it became known for its innovations in infantry tactics that would give rise to the German Stoßtruppen. The battalion began as a combat engineer detachment of the 8th Army Corps, part of a larger effort among German commanders to try and gain the tactical upper hand following the strategic and operational stagnation of trench warfare on the Western Front of World War I. The unit pioneered what would later be referred to as Stoßtrupptaktik (English: "stormtrooper (Note: During World War I, assault troops of the Imperial German Army were referred to as both Sturmtrupp ("assault/storm trooper") and Stoßtrupp ("shock trooper," lit. "shove trooper"). See Stormtroopers (Imperial Germany) for more.) tactics"), a body of field tactics taught to every subsequent German assault unit.

On the battlefield, Assault Battalion No. 5 participated in most major German operations of the Western Front of World War I, in addition to spending a significant amount of time training other units for assault roles. The unit's successes and contributions to German military tactics led to its commendation by Kaiser Wilhelm.

Despite being the first incorporated German assault battalion, it received the ordinal designation of "5" due to the fact it originated from the 5th Army.

== History ==
=== Background ===
Following the outbreak of hostilities in World War I, the German Army's primary military strategy was what is commonly referred to as the Schlieffen Plan, which sought to outflank Germany's shared border with the French Republic, whom they anticipated would be prepared for an invasion, by invading through the Low Countries. The success of the plan hinged on the ability to transport enough troops and equipment to the front quickly enough so as to end the war immediately with a single massive, decisive operation, consistent with German military theory at the time. The war began with the Battle of the Frontiers, the implementation of the French Army's Plan XVII, which failed disastrously and resulted in an unexpectedly rapid German advance. Despite early successes, however, the German front eventually outran its own supply line, and the German's war plans had grossly underestimated the speed at which the Franco-British forces were able to regroup. The resulting French offensive at the First Battle of the Marne caught the German Army off-guard and completely halted their advance, resulting in the collapse of the Schileffen Plan. The subsequent Race to the Sea inaugurated the period of the Western Front characterized as trench warfare, a brutal stalemate and war of attrition with little to no serious material gain for either side until nearing the end of the war.

=== Sturmabteilung Calsow ===
The 5th Assault Battalion began in 1915 as an experiment of the VIII Army Corps, originating as a detachment of two Pionier (sapper) companies designated Sturmabteilung Calsow (English: "Calsow's Assault Detachment"). At this time, German forces were increasingly frustrated by their lack of material gain, with much of German High Command growing to believe that a breakthrough was impossible. Consequently, commanders were becoming increasingly desperate for something that could reignite operational success on the Western Front and alleviate the stalemate of trench warfare. The detachment's initial deployment was on the French front line as emergency reinforcements, resulting in a resounding failure. Major Calsow was relieved from command as a result, replaced in September by Hauptmann Willy Rohr of the Guards Rifles Battalion's 3rd Company under Army Detachment B.

As commander of the Assault Detachment, Rohr used his previous experience, along with other similar experiments, to refit and retrain the unit for the purpose of trench raiding and close combat. To save on weight, he quickly abandoned the use of gun shields, as well as requested the development of a lighter type of field gun that was more practical for offensive maneuvers. These guns were based on captured 76mm Russian fortress guns, which were lightened and modified to be used as a stop-gap until the new cannons could be produced. Rohr's refit also included a machine gun and flamethrower platoon to provide support to the infantry.

Rohr's most significant change was in tactics and leadership, which were reworked to allow for more versatility in the complex environment of close-quarters trench fighting. Of the utmost importance was communication and leadership; both allowed his soldiers to operate as independent subunits whenever necessary to adapt to the situation. To facilitate this, the unit was broken up into very small squads of just a few men each, each led by a junior non-commissioned officer who had close communication with supporting weapons, like machine guns and field guns. The soldiers would charge through no man's land very quickly, utilizing hand grenades, pistols and flamethrowers to overwhelm enemy forces and secure a foothold in the trenches.

Although Rohr developed his tactics for the Assault Detachment, they were first tested in combat by the 187th Infantry Regiment at the Vosges mountains. The Assault Detachment themselves first utilized these tactics at Hartmannswillerkopf, which had been lost on December 21, 1915. The Detachment initially encountered heavy resistance, but eventually broke through and captured the position after two days of assaults. Afterwards, the Assault Detachment spent the next two months training other units in Army Detachment B in the hopes of creating a force that could eventually break the stalemate of the Western Front. In February 1916, the unit was reassigned to the 5th Army to begin the German attack at the Battle of Verdun.

==== At the Battle of Verdun ====
During the opening stages in the Battle of Verdun, the detachment was attached to the fifth army in preparation for an assault. Before it had commenced, the detachment was sent over to the 6th Infantry Division, III Army Corps, and saw combat in Azannes, Fort Douaumont, and Herbebois. Heavy combat losses deemed a 24-hour rest period a necessity for the detachment, and afterwards they were sent near Caillette Woods in hopes of capturing it. The assault was unsuccessful, leading to about 600 total casualties for all units involved in the assault during the initial phase. Once the operation concluded, the detachment was re-sent to the Fifth Army, where they trained additional infantry units in assault tactics, as well as replacements for their own unit. Prince Wilhelm personally asked Rohr as to why the German assaults were not more successful, to which he stated that cooperation between the various branches of service was minimal and that the infantry wasn't trained in the usage of new weapons and tactics, especially the usage of stielhandgranates, as German troops were distrustful of them. Rohr, from its debut in combat in early 1916 as a detachment, would go on to participate in 70 more assaults during the Battle of Verdun.

Men of the Sturmbataillon Nr. 5 'Rohr' resting in the woods at Doncourt-lès-Longuyon, 12th August 1916

==== Expansion into a battalion ====
After hearing Rohr's complaints, Prince Wilhelm put Rohr in charge of teaching infantry units in the usage of hand grenades, as well as the main principles of cooperation between infantry men during an assault. A training field was established at Beuville, and as a result the War Ministry expanded the small sturm-detachment into a full battalion. Two more pioneer assault companies using additional men from the Pioneer Replacement Battalion Nr. 7 were raised. Afterwards, replacements for the battalion came from the Pioneer Replacement Battalion Nr. 35, which originally provided replacements for the Pioneer Battalion Nr. 35. The machine gun platoon was expanded into a full company armed with six machine guns, and a howitzer battery armed with four 10.5cm Krupp mountain guns (Gebirgshaubitzen L/12) was added. On the 1st of April, 1916, the Detachment became 'Assault Bataillon Rohr' (Sturmbataillon Rohr). Rohr soon wrote a manual for upcoming Sturm Units, and after the fifth army was done training in Sturm Tactics, the rest of the armies began training in these new methods.

Haupt. Rohr created a fifth pioneer assault company by converting the battalion Pioneer Park Company into a fully trained and armed assault formation. Each assault company had a strength of 210 men. By the middle of 1916 the Battalion comprised the following:

- One battalion staff
- Five pioneer assault companies
- One machine gun company
- One trench-mortar detachment
- One flamethrower platoon
- One howitzer battery.

==== 1917 ====
Rohr's men saw more combat than they did in the previous year, but due to the position of the German army at this point, they were fighting defensively. At times, they were stationed in the rear and would be called up front to counterattack and regain lost ground. They spent much of 1917 fighting on the Western Front in the Verdun sector.

On February 18th, Prince Wilhelm permitted the men of the unit to wear a badge on their lower-left sleeve, above the cuff. The badge consisted of a crown above a 'W,' both in white metal and attached to an oval of field gray cloth. The Kaiser himself never approved of it, but the men of the unit still wore it.

Stormtrooper belonging to the 5th Sturmbataillon 'Rohr' with the lower left sleeve badge.

==== Hill 304 ====
One notable action occurred on the 29th of June, 1917, when men of the 1. Sturm-Kompanie attacked French positions on Hill 304. The company had been reinforced with stormtroopers from the 2. Sturm-Kompanie, as well as a mortar, howitzer, and machine gun platoon. The battalion's flamethrower platoon also participated. The assault was rehearsed by Rohr's men for three weeks, and French reconnaissance planes had taken photographs of them during rehearsals. The assault was to eliminate a salient 1800 yards wide, held by around 40 French dragoons belonging to the 24th Regiment.

After an extensive bombardment, men of the 1. Sturm-Kompanie emerged from their positions at 6:30pm and navigated across the battlefield. In front of them were three Kleif Flamethrower Squads, providing a black smoke screen for the advancing troops by firing half-second bursts with their flamethrower.

The French dragoons were quick to react, as they took up positions once the German bombardment concluded. The first wave was repulsed successfully, as the French made extensive use of machine guns, rifles, and grenades. The Sturm-Kompanie remained in No Man's Land for nearly three and a half hours before the three Kleif Squads made a breach. Some stormtroopers from the unit followed up behind them, and with the usage of hand grenades and the flamethrower, around half of the French forces were killed or wounded. The rest retreated from the position, withdrawing into the second line of defense 200 yards away.

The French were likely in a more elevated position, making the stormtroopers occupying the first line of defense vulnerable. The French used this to their advantage, as they threw grenades down below until the stormtroopers withdrew from the position and back to their own lines, giving up all of the ground they had taken during the assault.

American newspapers stated that during the assault, the battalion had lost two entire companies, but German reports state that eight men were killed in action and three were missing. The French launched multiple attacks nearly two months later, and Rohr's men were subjected to a defensive role for an entire week without respite. Though, they lost their positions shortly after.

=== Sturm-Bataillon ===
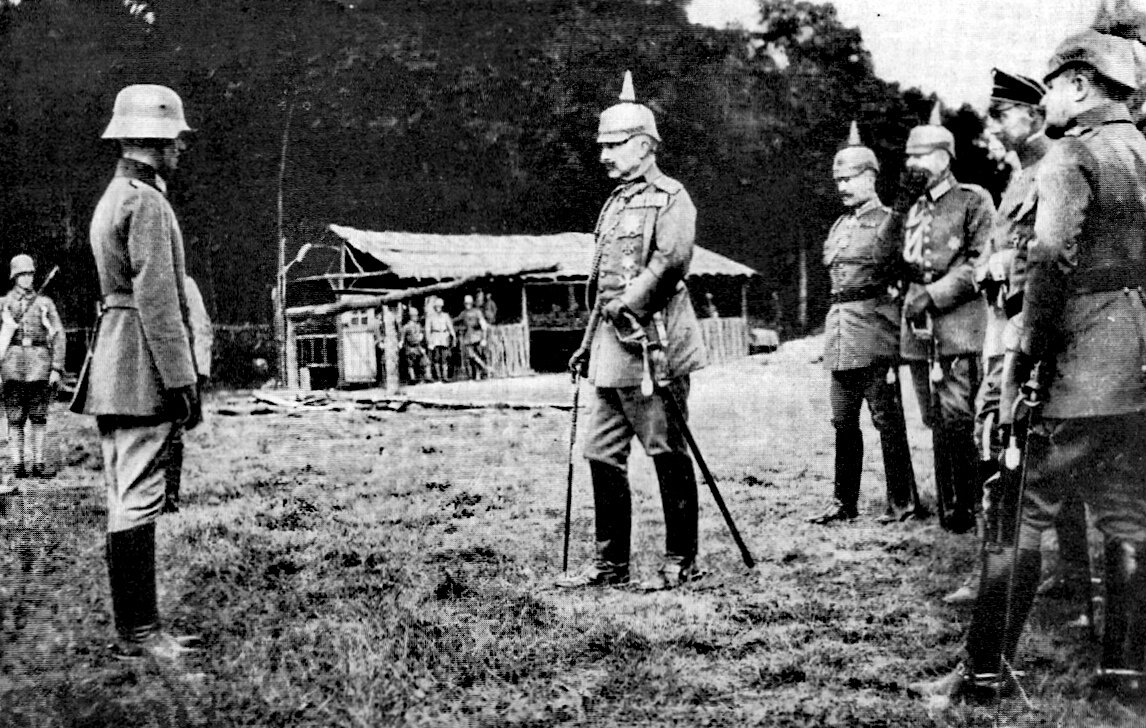
Kaiser Wilhelm II visits the Assault Battalion at their training grounds in the Doncourt forest (August 14, 1916) From left to right: Willy Rohr, Kaiser Wilhelm II, Oskar von Chelius, Adolf Wild von Hohenborn, Crown Prince Wilhelm and Hans von Plessen

As a battalion, the unit became a driving force in the adoption of Stoßtrupp tactics among the German Army. A training ground was constructed in the Doncourt forest near the French village of Doncourt-lès-Longuyon, where the Assault Battalion trained officers and other infantry units in the use of hand grenades, light cannons, machine guns and other new doctrinal elements. In addition to various standard infantry units, several Jäger battalions were converted into stormtrooper battalions. When not training other soldiers, the Assault Battalion was sent to hotspots on the German front, which came to be the dominant way of deploying assault units in the German Army during World War I. After a successful attack on French positions near the town of Revest-du-Bion at the Souville Gorge (French: "Ravin de Fontaine") on September 3, 1916, Rohr sent a report to Kaiser Wilhelm detailing the assault, about which the Kaiser was significantly pleased. Having visited their training grounds in August, he awarded the unit a commendation renamed it Sturm-Bataillon Nr. 5 (Rohr) at the behest of the Crown Prince on February 7, 1917.

After being impressed by an honor guard of Rohr's stormtroopers stationed at the Crown Prince's headquarters, Quartermaster General of the Imperial German Army Erich Ludendorff ordered all field armies to form their own stormtrooper units on October 2, 1916.

On March 19, 1918, Captain Rohr went with the 5th Assault Battalion to the 18th Army Headquarters in Leschelle to prepare for one of Germany's final assaults during the First World War, Operation Michael. During preparations in April, Captain Rohr was promoted to major.

=== Dissolution ===
In October 1918, the 5th Assault Battalion was sent under secret orders to guard Kaiser Wilhelm, who had fled from Berlin due to political unrest to the Supreme Army Headquarters in Spa, Belgium. Chancellor of Germany Prince Max von Baden and Field Marshal Paul von Hindenburg, threatened by the SPD and growing revolutionary movement, demanded that the Kaiser abdicate so the Reichstag could vote to end the war. Hindenburg eventually convinced Wilhelm to do so, and on November 10 he fled to the Netherlands to live in exile. The remaining units in the Supreme Army Headquarters fled the following day to avoid being imprisoned by advancing Allied forces. The 5th Assault Battalion was demobilized near Schwelm. Following the end of World War I and the drafting of the Treaty of Versailles, most units of the German Army, including the assault battalions, were dissolved to comply with the 100,000 man limit on the Reichswehr. Former stormtroopers found themselves with no military position, including Major Rohr, who was forced to take supply jobs as a lieutenant colonel, and for which he later resigned. Many stormtroopers would later join the Black Reichswehr and other paramilitary organizations during the Weimar era.

== Tactics ==
The tactics developed by the 5th Assault Battalion, Rohr and other experimenters in the German Army bore many similarities to modern infantry tactics. Elements that would later become critical to the development of infantry warfare during and after World War II, such as the use of squads, inter-unit coordination and non-commissioned officers, were implemented by the Assault Battalions during World War I. The efficacy of the 5th Assault Battalions' tactics would later go on to inform German infantry doctrine during World War II, where many elements of "stormtrooper tactics" (such as the extensive use of both light and heavy machine guns and hand grenades) and were rolled into standard infantry units, with standard German squads consisting of a mix of short-range, long-range and fire-support weaponry.

== Equipment ==
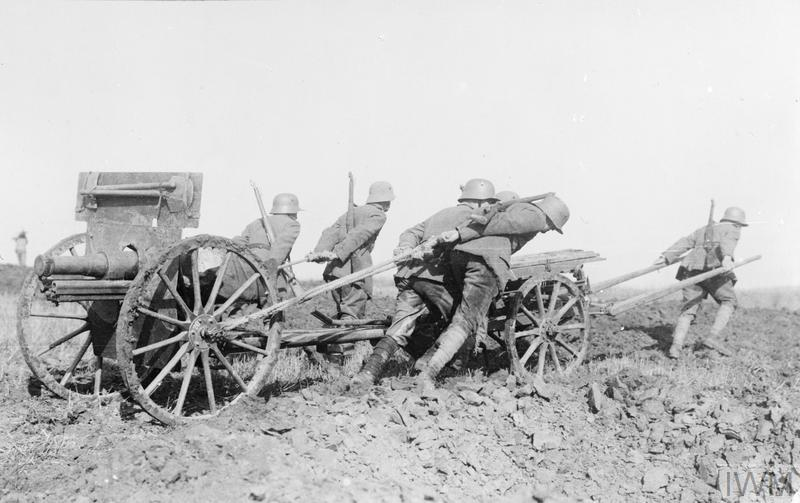
German stormtroopers haul a cut-down Russian 76.2mm M1902 field gun across no man's land

Prevailing tactics in World War I championed personal marksmanship with the full-length bolt-action rifle, the standard issue firearm for infantry on all sides of the war. However, when fighting in trenches, the narrow, claustrophobic passages made full-length infantry rifles next to impossible to use, and the large amount of ammunition and supplies in standard infantry kit weighed soldiers down and made it difficult to navigate in combat. Considering that Rohr's unit deliberately sought to fight in those environments, many changes were made to the unit's equipment to better accommodate their tactics.

Weapons which were short and fast-firing, such as handguns equipped with drum magazines, or more commonly regular pistols were particularly useful in trenches. They were primarily issued to non-commissioned-officers and officers, though you could see some enlistees with sidearms. Additionally, they used any manner of improvised melee weapons, colloquially referred to as trench clubs. Bolt-action rifles, specifically the Kar98az, were the most common firearm amongst the majority of the ranks, even officers and non-commissioned-officers used them for their range. Despite popular belief, it is likely that Rohr’s Battalion was never issued any Bergmann MP-18’s, as there is no evidence any were allocated to the unit.

In December 1915, Rohr's unit implemented uniform changes to better address their unique battlefield challenges. The primary change was the replacement of standard-issue army jackboots with M1914 Schnurschue ankle boots and leg-wrap gaiters (Gamaschen) to improve mobility when moving across rough battlefield terrain. In addition, sandbags were emptied and converted into canvas bags to hold grenades, allowing a single soldier to carry several on his person without sacrificing room on his equipment belt. Rohr’s Battalion, and many other Sturm-Units began removing their ammunition pouches for the sake of being as light as possible. Additional ammunition clips were kept in trouser pockets, and breadbags.

== Legacy ==
Since the German stormtroopers of World War I lost their positions when the Reichswehr was downsized, a large number sought some form of employment within various paramilitary groups during the Weimar era. Large numbers of former soldiers rejoined military service as members of the Freikorps, interwar paramilitary units raised and organized by German veterans, ostensibly to defend Germany from communist groups such as the Spartakusbund and KPD. These groups at times fought under direct command of the Reichswehr and were frequently used by the German government to put down rebellions and strikes. However, after the failed Kapp Putsch, where a number of Freikorps units and other right-wing paramilitaries attempted to overthrow the Weimar Republic and install an autocratic military dictatorship, the Freikorps were removed from senior military positions, outlawed and partially replaced with what would become known as the Black Reichswehr. Consequently, many unemployed soldiers also began to align themselves with right-wing militant groups like Der Stahlhelm, who catered to the worries of German veterans. Aspects of the extreme militaristic culture of German stormtroopers during World War I (such as the "stab-in-the-back myth") created conditions for extensive right-wing violence, which was in large part responsible for the rise of the Nazi party. The name of the Nazis' Weimar-era paramilitary force, the Sturmabteilung, reflects its roots in the culture of German militarism, sharing its title with the temporary designation afforded to early trench-raiding experiments in the Imperial German Army like the 5th Assault Battalion.
