= William Norwood =

William Norwood may refer to:

- William Imon Norwood (1941–2020), American pediatric cardiothoracic surgeon
- William R. Norwood (1909–1981), American government official
- William Ray Norwood Jr. (born 1981), American singer

== See also ==
- Willie Norwood (disambiguation)
