= Infiltration tactics =

Infantry bypassing strongpoints

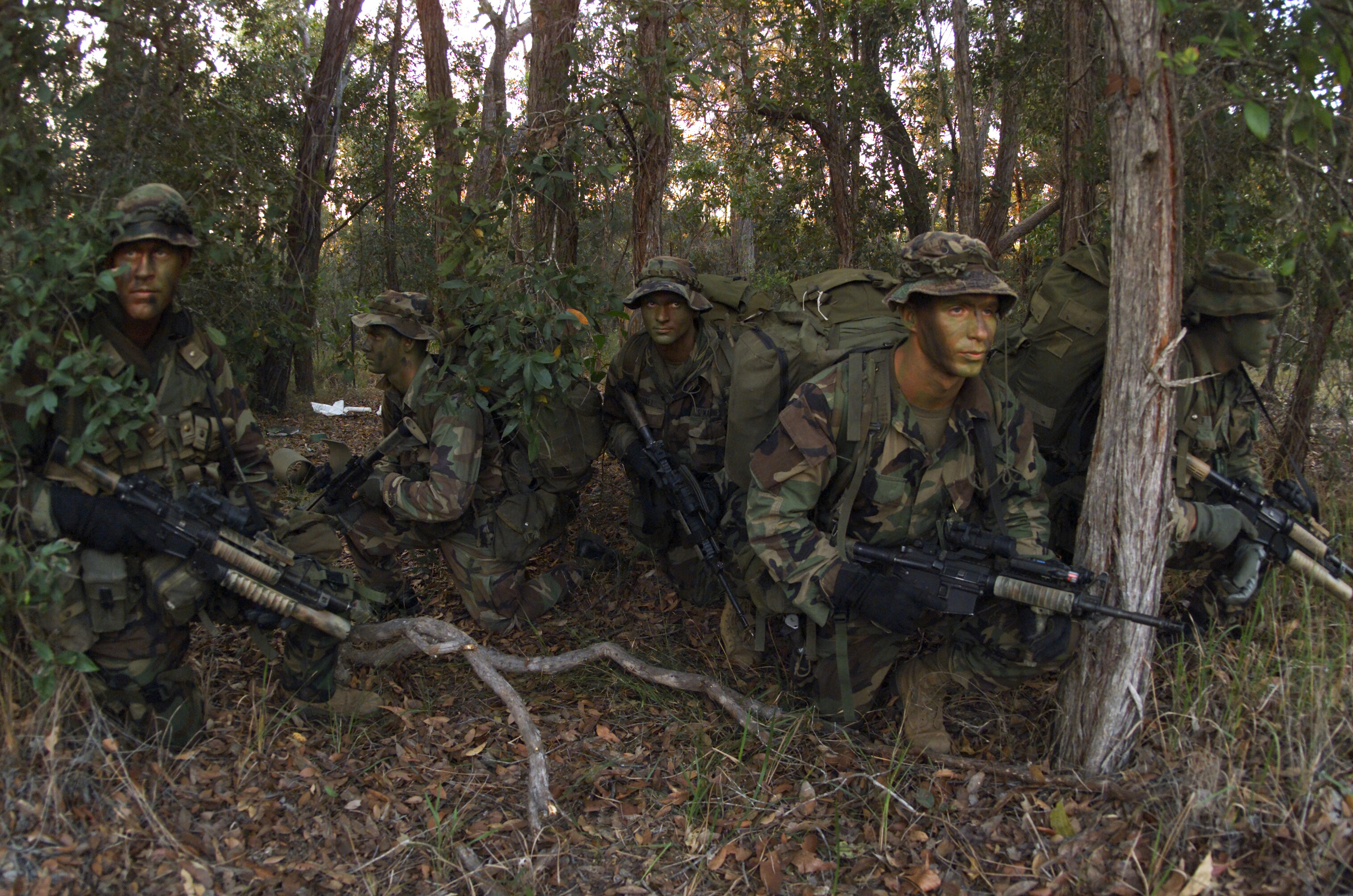
Deep Reconnaissance Platoon on exercise in 2003, Bravo Company, 3rd Reconnaissance Battalion, US 3rd Marine Division

In warfare, infiltration tactics involve small independent light infantry forces advancing into enemy rear areas, bypassing enemy frontline strongpoints, possibly isolating them for attack by follow-up troops with heavier weapons. Soldiers take the initiative to identify enemy weak points and choose their own routes, targets, moments and methods of attack; this requires a high degree of skill and training, and can be supplemented by special equipment and weaponry to give them more local combat options.

Forms of these infantry tactics were used by skirmishers and irregulars dating back to classical antiquity, but only as a defensive or secondary tactic; decisive battlefield victories were achieved by shock combat tactics with heavy infantry or heavy cavalry, typically charging en masse against the primary force of the opponent. By the time of early modern warfare, defensive firepower made this tactic increasingly costly. When trench warfare developed to its height in World War I, most such attacks were complete failures. Raiding by small groups of experienced soldiers, using stealth and cover, was commonly employed and often successful, but these could not achieve decisive victory.

Infiltration tactics developed slowly through World War I and early World War II, partially as a way of turning these harassing tactics into a decisive offensive doctrine. At first, only special units were trained in these tactics, typified by German Stoßtruppen (shock troops). By the end of World War II, almost all regular ground forces of the major powers were trained and equipped to employ forms of infiltration tactics, though some specialize in this, such as commandos, long-range reconnaissance patrols, US Army Rangers, airborne and other special forces, and forces employing irregular warfare.

While a specialist tactic during World War I, infiltration tactics are now regularly fully integrated as standard part of the modern maneuver warfare, down to basic fire and movement at the squad and section level, so the term has little distinct meaning today. Infiltration tactics may not be standard in modern combat where training is limited, such as for militia or rushed conscript units, or in desperate attacks where an immediate victory is required. Examples are German Volkssturm formations at the end of World War II, and Japanese banzai attacks of the same period.

== Development during World War I ==
These tactics emerged gradually during World War I. Several nations modified their existing tactics in ways that supported ideas that were later called infiltration tactics, with the German developments having the most impact, both during the war and afterwards.

=== Germany ===
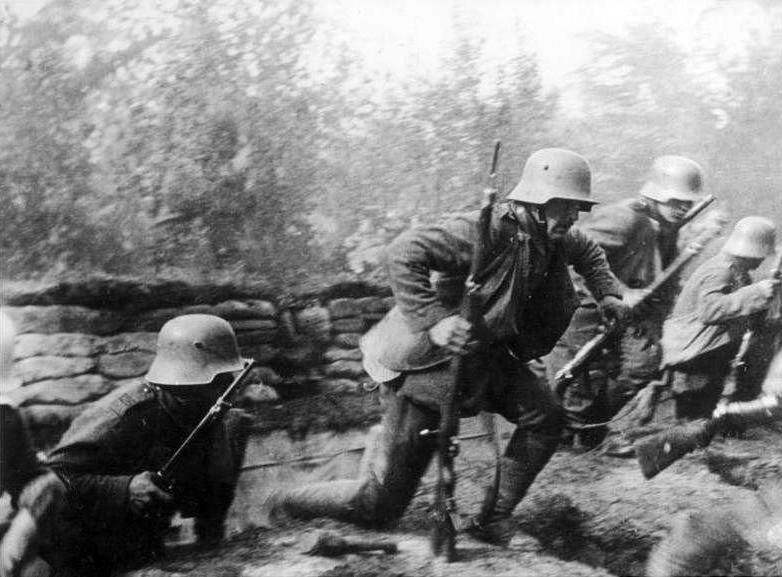
German Stoßtruppen (stormtroopers) rising from trenches to attack, equipped with satchel-bags of grenades

As far back as the 18th century, Prussian military doctrine stressed maneuver and force concentration to achieve a decisive battle (Vernichtungsgedanke). The German military searched for ways to apply this in the face of trench warfare. Captain Willy Rohr fought in the long Battle of Hartmannswillerkopf (1914–1915), starting with two Pionier (combat engineer) companies. Such engineers were often employed in assaulting fortifications, using non-standard weapons and tactics compared to the regular infantry. Rohr's initial efforts to use these as special advanced strike teams, to break French trench lines for following troops to exploit, achieved only limited success, with heavy losses. Rohr, working with his superiors, saw equipment improved, including the new Stahlhelme (steel helmets), ample supplies of hand grenades, flamethrowers, light mortars and light machine guns. Rohr's analysis was that much more training was needed to incorporate the new weapons and to coordinate separate attacks as needed to achieve the overall operational goals. His analysis got the attention of the Oberste Heeresleitung (OHL, German army high command). In December 1915, Rohr was given the task of training the army in "modern close combat", and soon promoted to major. During the next two years, special Stoßtruppen (stormtrooper) detachments were created in divisions throughout the army; select men were sent to Rohr for training, who became trainers when they returned to their units. These tactics were expanded and refined by many in the German military command, extending the Prussian military doctrine down to the smallest units – specially trained troops maneuvered and organised to strike selected positions, wherever opportunities were found.

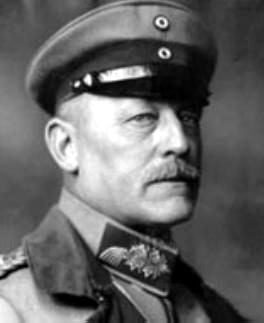
General Oskar von Hutier, whose name is often associated with German infiltration tactics

German infiltration tactics are sometimes called Hutier tactics, after German General Oskar von Hutier, even though his role in developing the tactics was limited. Hutier, along with his artillery commander Colonel Georg Bruchmüller, improved the use of artillery in ways that suited infiltration tactics. Conventional mass-wave tactics were typically preceded by days of constant bombardment of all defender positions, attempting to gain advantage by attrition. Hutier favoured brief but intense hurricane bombardments that allow the opponent little time to react and reinforce their line. The bombardment targeted the opponents' rear areas to destroy or disrupt roads, artillery, and command centres. This was done to suppress and confuse the defenders and reduce their capability to counterattack from their rearward defence lines. For maximum effect, the exact points of attack remained concealed until the last possible moment, and the infantry attacked immediately following the short bombardment.

The German stormtrooper methods involve men rushing forward in small but mutually supporting groups, using whatever cover is available, and then laying down covering fire for the other groups as they moved. The tactics aim to avoid attacking any strongpoints directly, by first breaching the weakest points of the defender's line, and using those to gain positional advantages on other points. Additionally, they acknowledge the futility of managing a grand detailed plan of operations from afar, opting instead for junior officers on the spot to exercise initiative, expanding the earlier Prussian doctrine of Auftragstaktik (mission-based tactics).

Due to the extensive training needed, stormtroopers remained small elite forces. Regular infantry with heavy weapons would follow up, using more standard tactics, reducing isolated and weakened opposing strongpoints with flank attacks, as the stormtroopers continued the advance beyond them. Reserve troops following these had to consolidate gains against counterattacks.

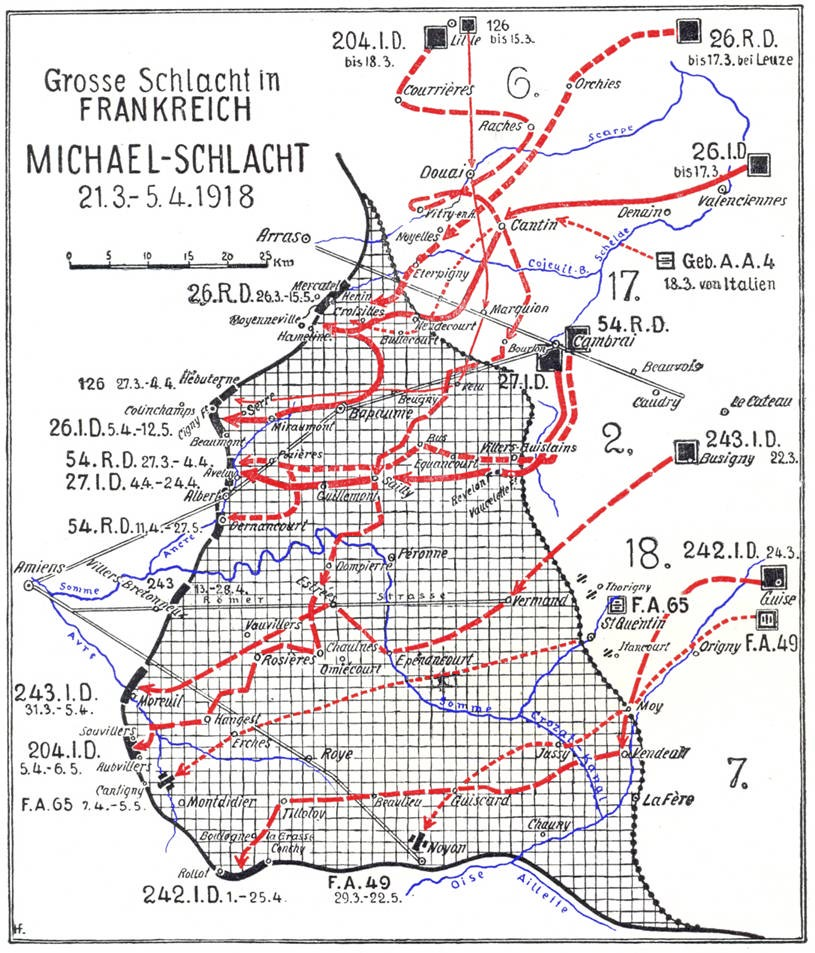
Initial success of Operation Michael within the German spring offensive, 21 March – 5 April 1918

The Germans employed and improved infiltration tactics with increasing success, at first defensively in counterattacks as part of Germany's defence in depth and then offensively, leading up to the Battle of Caporetto against the Italians in 1917 and finally the massive German spring offensive in 1918 against the British and French. Initial German successes were stunning; of these, Hutier's 18th Army gained more than 50 km (30 mi) in less than a week – the farthest advance in the Western Front since the Race to the Sea had ended the war of movement in 1914. This advance would hereafter associate Hutier's name with infiltration tactics in Western Europe. The German armies began to stall after outrunning their supply, artillery and reinforcements, which could not catch up over the shell-torn ground left ruined by Allied attacks in the Battle of the Somme in 1916; the offensives failed to achieve a war-winning breakthrough dividing the French and British armies. The exhausted German forces lost the initiative and were soon pushed back in the Allied Hundred Days Offensive, ending in the German surrender.

Though far more successful tactically than traditional attacks, infiltration tactics did not address supporting any resulting advances operationally, so they tended to bog-down over time and allow the defender time to regroup. German artillery, critical during the initial assault, lagged far behind afterwards. The elite stormtroopers took notable casualties on the initial attacks, which could not be readily replaced. German forces lacked mobile forces such as cavalry to exploit and secure deep advances. Most importantly, German logistical capabilities, designed for a static front, failed to sustain troops advancing far into devastated enemy territory.

The German military did not use the term infiltration tactics as a distinct new manner of warfare but more as a continuous improvement to their wide array of military tactics. When the "new" German tactics made headlines in Allied nations in 1918, the French published articles on the "Hutier tactics" as they saw it; this focused more on the operational surprise of the start of the attack and the effective hurricane bombardment, rather than the low-level tactics. In post-war years, although information on "Hutier tactics" was widely distributed in France, the US and Britain, most generals were skeptical about these new tactics, given the German defeat. In Germany, infiltration tactics were integrated into the Reichswehr and the Wehrmacht. Felix Steiner, former officer of the Reichswehr, introduced the principle of stormtroopers into the formation of the Waffen-SS, in order to shape it into a new type of army using this tactic. When combined with armoured fighting vehicles and aircraft to extend the tactics' operational capabilities, this contributed to what would be called Blitzkrieg in the Second World War.

=== France ===
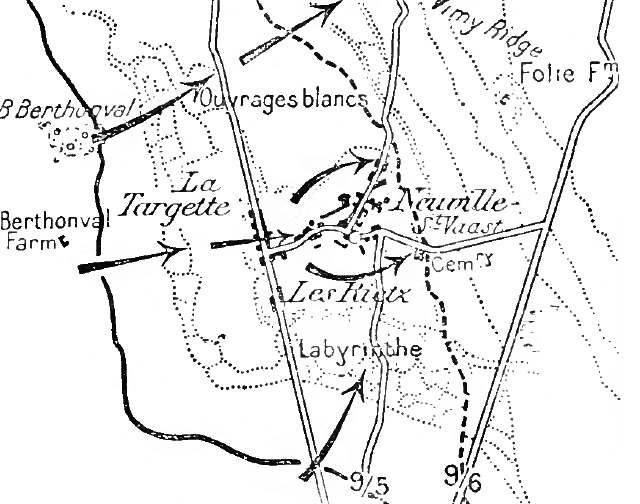
Mix of new and old French tactics help capture Neuville-Saint-Vaast, but with heavy casualties, 9 May – 9 June 1915, as part of the Second Battle of Artois

New French tactics that included an initial step for infiltration were published by the Grand Quartier Général (GQG, French General Headquarters) on 16 April 1915, in But et conditions d’une action offensive d’ensemble (Goal and Conditions for a General Offensive Action), its widely circulated version being Note 5779. It states that the first waves of infantry should penetrate as far as possible and leave enemy strongpoints to be dealt with by follow-up nettoyeurs de tranchée (trench cleaner) waves. The note covers weapons and close-combat tactics for the trench cleaners, but the tactics and weapons of preceding waves are unchanged, and there is little mention of any additional support for the now-detached advanced waves. The note contains annexes covering different subjects, including artillery, infantry defense, and infantry attacks. For attacks, Note 5779 continued to promote the pre-war French doctrine of la percée (the breakthrough), where an offensive is driven by a grand, single plan with continuous waves of reserves targeting the operation's distant and static objectives. It does not cover methods of adapting to local success or setbacks, nor the small-unit initiative, coordination and additional training this would require. The tactics were employed with some success on the opening day of the Second Battle of Artois, 9 May 1915, by the French XXXIII Corps; they advanced 4.5 kilometres (2.8 mi) in the first hour and a half of the attack but were unable to reinforce and consolidate to hold onto all these gains against German counterattacks. The battle was costly and inconclusive, taking a heavy toll in French troops and matériel. Later French infantry tactics moved away from the costly la percée towards a more practical grignotage (literally nibbling, taking in small bits) doctrine, which employed a series of smaller and more methodical operations with limited objectives; each of these were still planned at headquarters, rather than from immediate local initiative. Note 5779 also describes an early form of rolling barrage in its artillery annex; this was employed with success and continued to be developed by the French as well as by most other nations throughout the war.

In August 1915, a young French infantry officer, Captain André Laffargue, put forward additional ideas in a pamphlet titled Étude sur l’attaque dans la période actuelle de la guerre (Study of the Attack in the Current Period of the War). Laffargue based his proposals in particular on his experiences in the initially successful but ultimately disappointing results of employing the tactics of Note 5779 at the Second Battle of Artois; he commanded a company of the 153rd Infantry Regiment, attacking immediately south of Neuville-Saint-Vaast on 9 May 1915. Laffargue was left wounded on the German front line but his regiment advanced another 1.5 kilometres (0.93 mi), only to be held up by two German machine guns. Laffargue's pamphlet focused primarily on the small-unit perspective, calling for mobile firepower to deal with local resistance such as machine guns, advocating that the first waves of an attack advance through the intervals or gaps between centres of resistance, which should be temporarily neutralised on the edges by fire or heavy smoke. The points of resistance would then be encircled and dealt with by successive waves. This promotes coordinating local forces to deal with local resistance as it is encountered, an important second step in infiltration tactics. Laffargue suggests that had these methods been followed the attack could have resulted in a complete breakthrough of the German defences and the capture of Vimy Ridge.

The French Army published Laffargue's pamphlet in 1915 and the following year a commercial edition found wide circulation, but as informational rather than being officially adopted by the French military. The British translated and published Laffargue's pamphlet in December 1915 and, like others, continued to make frequent use of wave attacks. The US Infantry Journal published a translation in 1916.

In contrast to the infiltration tactics then under development in the German army, the tactics of Note 5779 and as expanded by Laffargue remained firmly wedded to the use of the attack by waves, despite the high casualties which could ensue. Laffargue maintained that the psychological support of the attack in line was necessary to enable men to advance against heavy fire.

In 1916, captured copies of Laffargue's pamphlet were translated and distributed by the German army. How much this may have influenced German infiltration tactics is not known; such influence has been dismissed by Gudmundsson. The Germans had started developing their own infiltration tactics in the spring of 1915, months before Laffargue's pamphlet was even published.

=== Russia ===
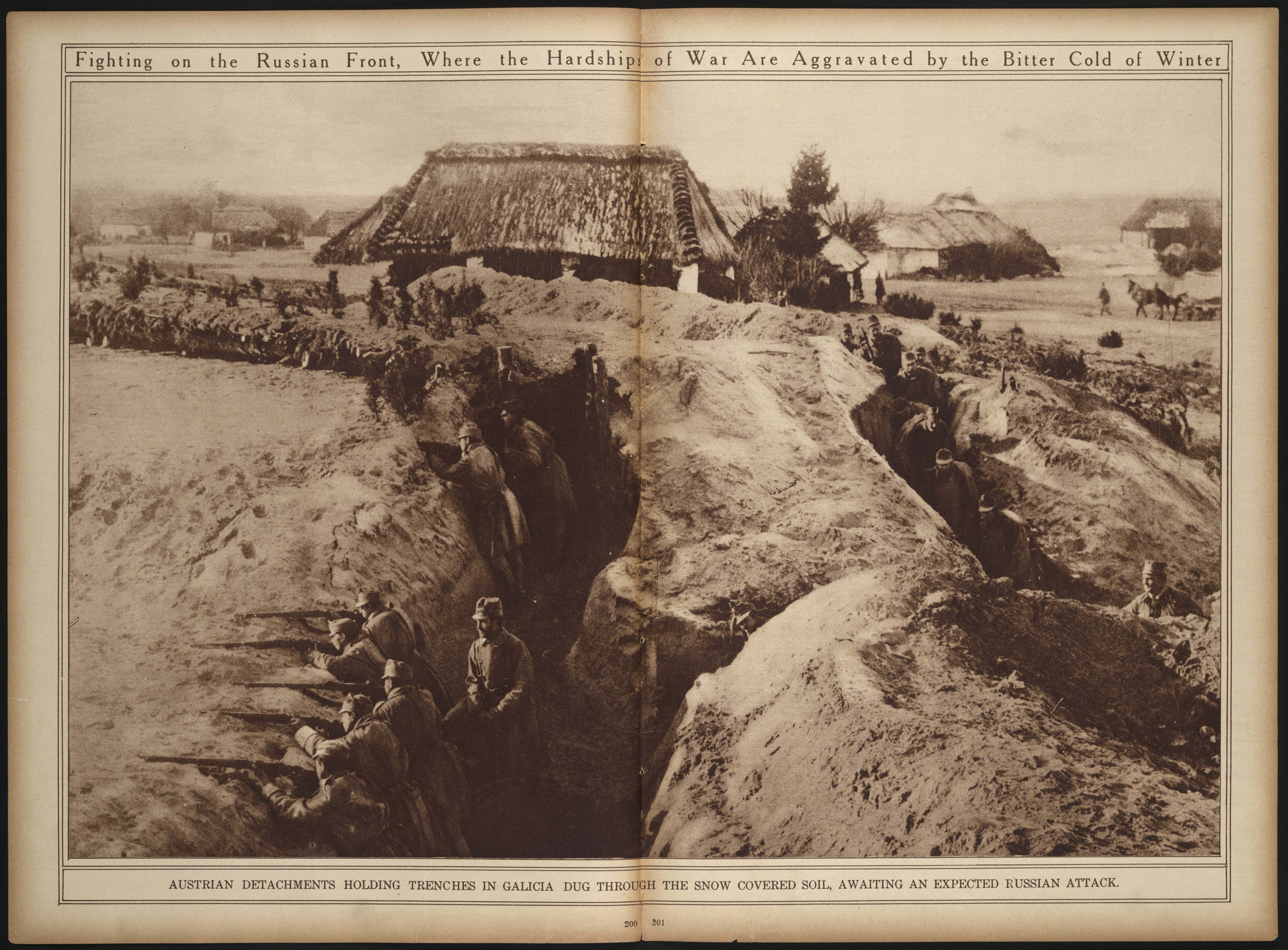
Austrian detachments holding trenches in Galicia, dug through the snow-covered soil

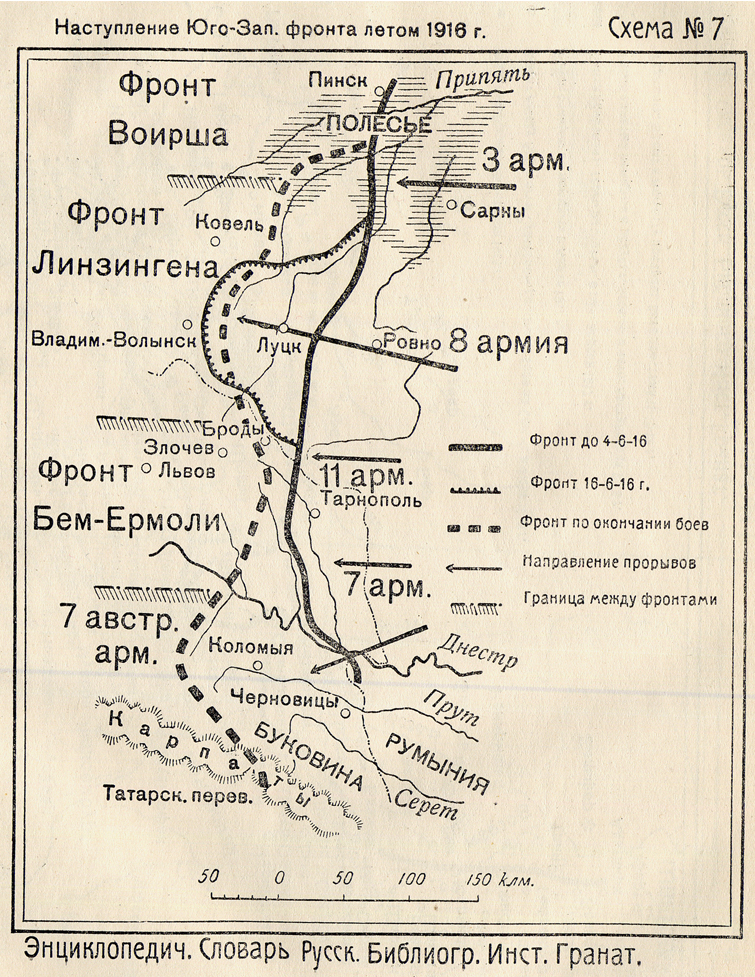
The Brusilov Offensive, with starting positions on 4 June 1916 (thick solid line), initial advances on 16 June (thinner jagged line), and final positions on 20 September (dotted line)

The vast Eastern Front of World War I, much less confined than the Western Front, was much less affected by trench warfare, but trench lines still tended to take hold whenever the front became static. Still, about a third of all Russian divisions remained cavalry, including Cossack divisions.

General Aleksei Brusilov, commanding the Russian Southwestern Front, promoted large-scale simultaneous attacks along a wide front in order to limit defenders' ability to respond to any one point, thus allowing the collapse of the entire defending line and returning to maneuver warfare. For the Brusilov Offensive of 1916, he meticulously prepared a massive surprise attack on a very wide 400 km (250 mi) front stretching from the Pripet Marshes to the Carpathian Mountains, with the objective of Lemburg, Galicia (now Lviv, Ukraine), 100 km (60 mi) behind the well-fortified Austro-Hungarian line. The Austro-German military command was confident that these deep and extensive entrenchments, equal to those of the Germans on Western Front, could not be broken without significant Russian reinforcements.

After a thorough reconnaissance, Brusilov directed preparations for several months. Forward trenches were dug as bridgeheads for the attack, which approached the Austro-Hungarian trench lines as closely as 70 m (230 ft). Select forces were trained and tasked with breaking through the defending lines, creating gaps to be widened by 8 total successive waves of infantry, allowing deep penetration. Brusilov committed all his reserves into the initial assault.

Although Brusilov favoured shorter bombardments, the bombardment preparation for this offensive was more than two days long, from 3am on June 4 (May 22 old style) to 9am on June 6 (May 24). This bombardment disrupted the first defense zone and partially neutralized the defending artillery. The first infantry attacks made breakthroughs at 13 points, which were soon increased in width and depth. Austro-Hungarian response to the unexpected offensive was slow and limited, believing that their existing forces and defenses would prove sufficient; instead, reserve units sent forward to counterattack often found their routes already overrun by the Russians. The Russian 8th Army, commanded by Brusilov himself just a few months before his promotion to command the Southwestern Front, achieved the greatest success, advancing 48 km (30 mi) in less than a week. The 7th and 9th Army achieved lesser gains, though the remaining 11th Army in the center made no initial breakthroughs. The performance of individual Austro-Hungarian units during the campaign, each raised from separate diverse societies within the Empire, was highly variable, with some units long standing firm despite the odds, like the Polish Legions at the Battle of Kostiuchnówka, whereas others readily retreated in panic or surrendered, as at the Battle of Lutsk.

Though the campaign was devastating to the Austro-Hungarian Army, Russian losses were very high. German forces were sent to reinforce, and the initial Russian advantages waned. Though Russian attacks continued for months, their cost in Russian men and materiel increased while gains diminished. In the end, much like the bold French tactics of la percée at the Second Battle of Artois, these tactics were too costly to maintain. The Imperial Russian Army never fully recovered, and the monumental losses of so many Russian soldiers helped fuel the Russian Revolution of 1917, leading to disbanding the Imperial Russian Army.

Though the Brusilov Campaign impressed the German Army High Command, how this may have influenced their further development of infiltration tactics is not known. Elements of Brusilov's tactics were eventually used by the Red Army in developing their Deep Battle doctrine for World War II.

=== Britain ===
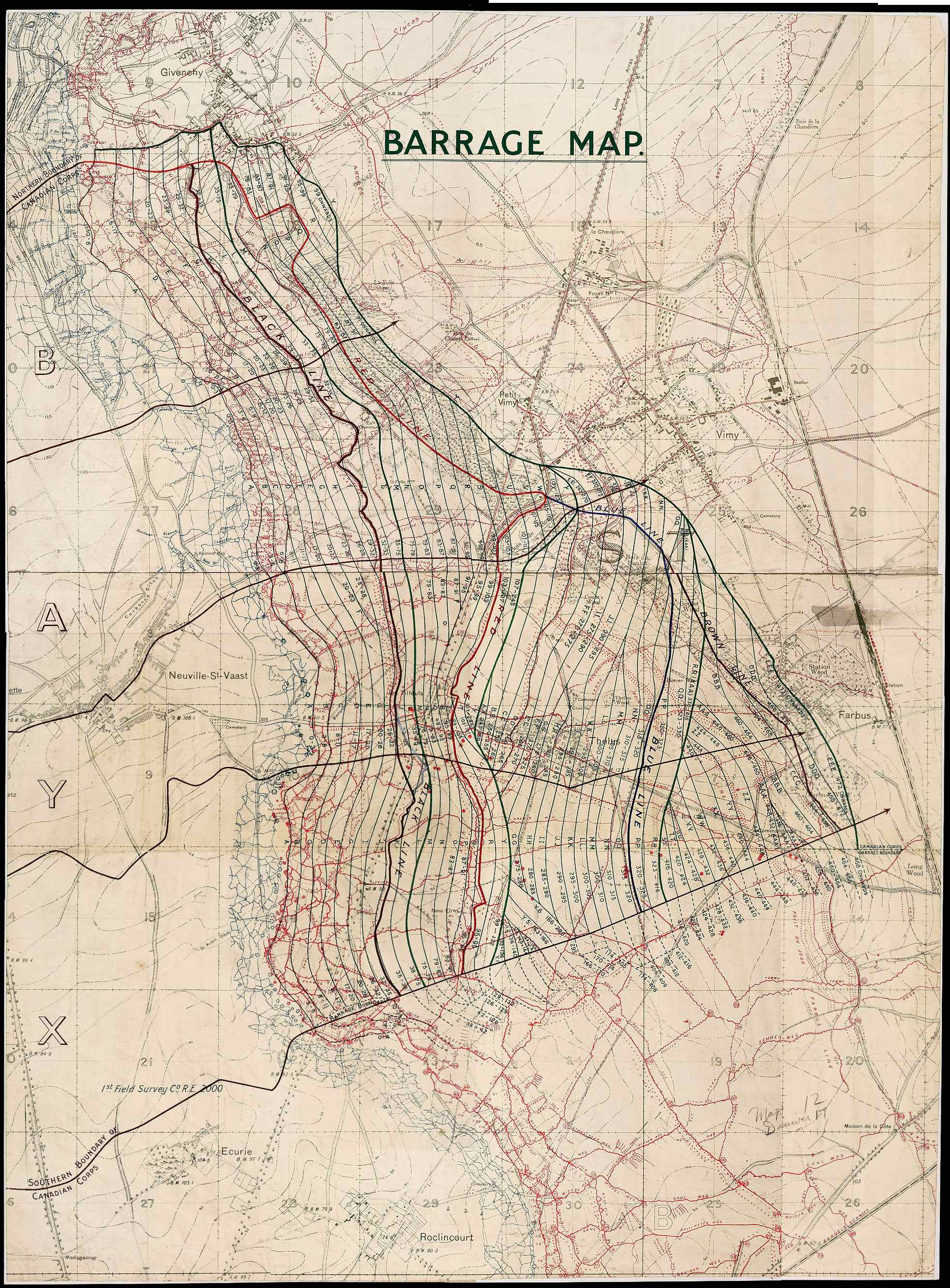
Map detailing exact positions and timing of the planned creeping barrage for the Canadian assault on Vimy Ridge, April 1917

The British Army pursued a doctrine of integrating new technologies and updating old ones to find advantages in trench warfare.

At the Battle of Neuve Chapelle, March 1915, a well-planned British attack on German trenches, coordinated with short but effective artillery bombardment, achieved a local breakthrough. Though ammunition shortages and command and control issues prevented exploiting the gains, this demonstrated the importance of a combined infantry-artillery doctrine.

Initial experiences in trench warfare, shared between British and French, led both to increase pre-bombardment (requiring dramatically increased artillery munitions production), and also to supply infantry with more firepower, such as light mortars, light machine guns, and rifle grenades. While the British hoped that this new combination of arms, once improved and properly executed, could achieve decisive breakthroughs, the French moved from their pre-war grand la percée doctrine to more limited and practical tactical objectives. At this same time, the Germans were learning the value of deep trenches, defense in depth, defensive artillery, and quick counter-attacks.

This came to a head with the British Somme Offensive on 1 July 1916. Douglas Haig, commanding the British Expeditionary Force (BEF), planned on an ambitious large-scale quick breakthrough, with an extensive artillery bombardment targeting the German front-line defenses, followed by a creeping barrage leading a mass infantry assault. Despite planning, execution was flawed, perhaps resulting from the rapid expansion of the British Army. The British losses on the first days were horrific. British operations improved over the next several months of the campaign, however. Learning the limits of battle planning and bombardment, they abandoned single grand objectives, and adopted a "bite and hold" doctrine (equivalent to the French grignotage) of limited, local objectives to what could be supported by available artillery in close cooperation. Combining this with new arms was still promoted; Britain's new secret weapon, the tank, made its first appearance midway through the Somme operations. Though not yet effective, their promise of breakthroughs in the future was held out.

The British Third Army employed tactics giving platoons more independence at the Battle of Arras in April 1917 (most notably the capture of Vimy Ridge by the Canadian Corps), following the reorganisation of British infantry platoons according to the new Manual SS 143. This still advocated wave attacks, taking strongpoints and consolidating before advancing, part of "bite-and-hold" tactics, but this did allow for more local flexibility, and set groundwork for low-level unit initiative, an important aspect of infiltration tactics.

=== Hurricane bombardment ===
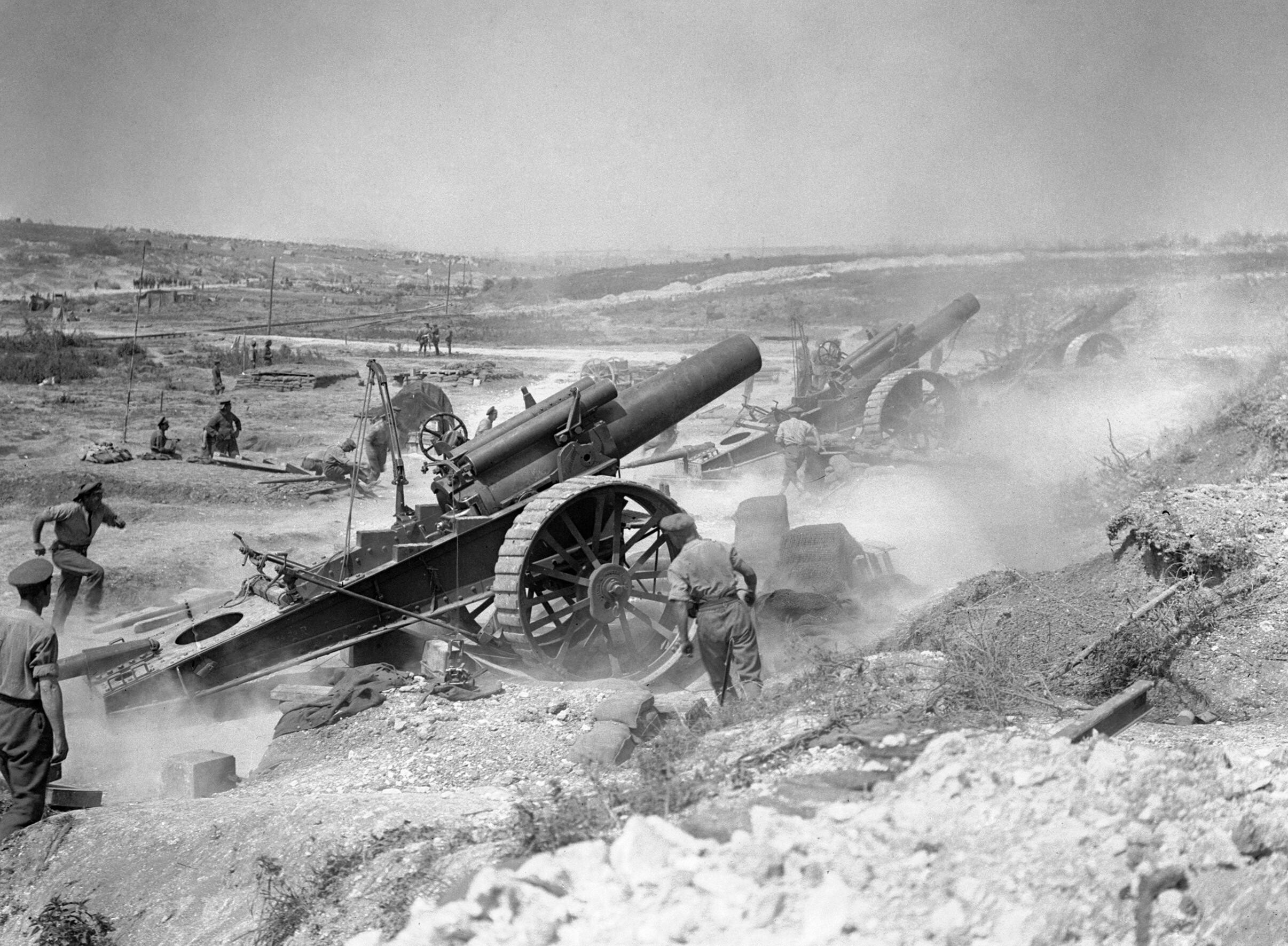
8-inch howitzers of the 39th Siege Battery, Royal Garrison Artillery conducting a bombardment in the Fricourt-Mametz Valley, August 1916, during the Battle of the Somme

A new method of artillery use evolved during World War I, colloquially called hurricane bombardment. This is a very quick but intense artillery bombardment, in contrast to the prevailing artillery tactic of long bombardments. Various forms of quick bombardments were employed at several times and places during the war, but the most successful use of hurricane bombardment was when it was combined with German infiltration tactics in which local forces take immediate advantage of any enemy weak points they find.

After the start of trench warfare in World War I, and artillery moved from direct fire to indirect fire, the standard use of artillery preceding any friendly infantry attack became a very long artillery bombardment, often lasting several days, to destroy the opponent's defences and kill the defenders. But trenches were very soon extended to avoid this; they were dug deeper and connected by deep or even underground passages to bunkers far behind the lines, where defenders could safely wait out bombardments. When the bombardment stopped, this signalled the start of the attack to the defenders, and they quickly moved back to their forward positions. This practice of very long bombardments expanded over the course of the war, in the hopes of at least causing a few casualties, damaging surface defences like barbed wire lines and machine gun nests, and exhausting and demoralizing the defenders by the stress of being forced underground for so long, the noise and the vibrations.

The Allies, led by the British, developed alternative artillery tactics using shorter bombardments; these sought to achieve success by surprise. (This was also to use limited ammunition supplies more efficiently.) The effectiveness of short bombardments was dependent on local conditions: the targets had to be identified and located beforehand, many artillery pieces were needed, each with ample ammunition, and the preparations had to be kept hidden from the defenders.

To further increase the chance of success, these short bombardments were sometimes followed by barrages. Many variations were devised, including moving barrages, block barrages, creeping barrages, standing and box barrages. The goal of an artillery barrage was to target a line of impact points repeatedly so as to impede infantry movement; these lines could be held in position or slowly moved to inhibit movement by the opponent or even force them into poor positions. The barrage plans were often quite complicated and could be very effective.

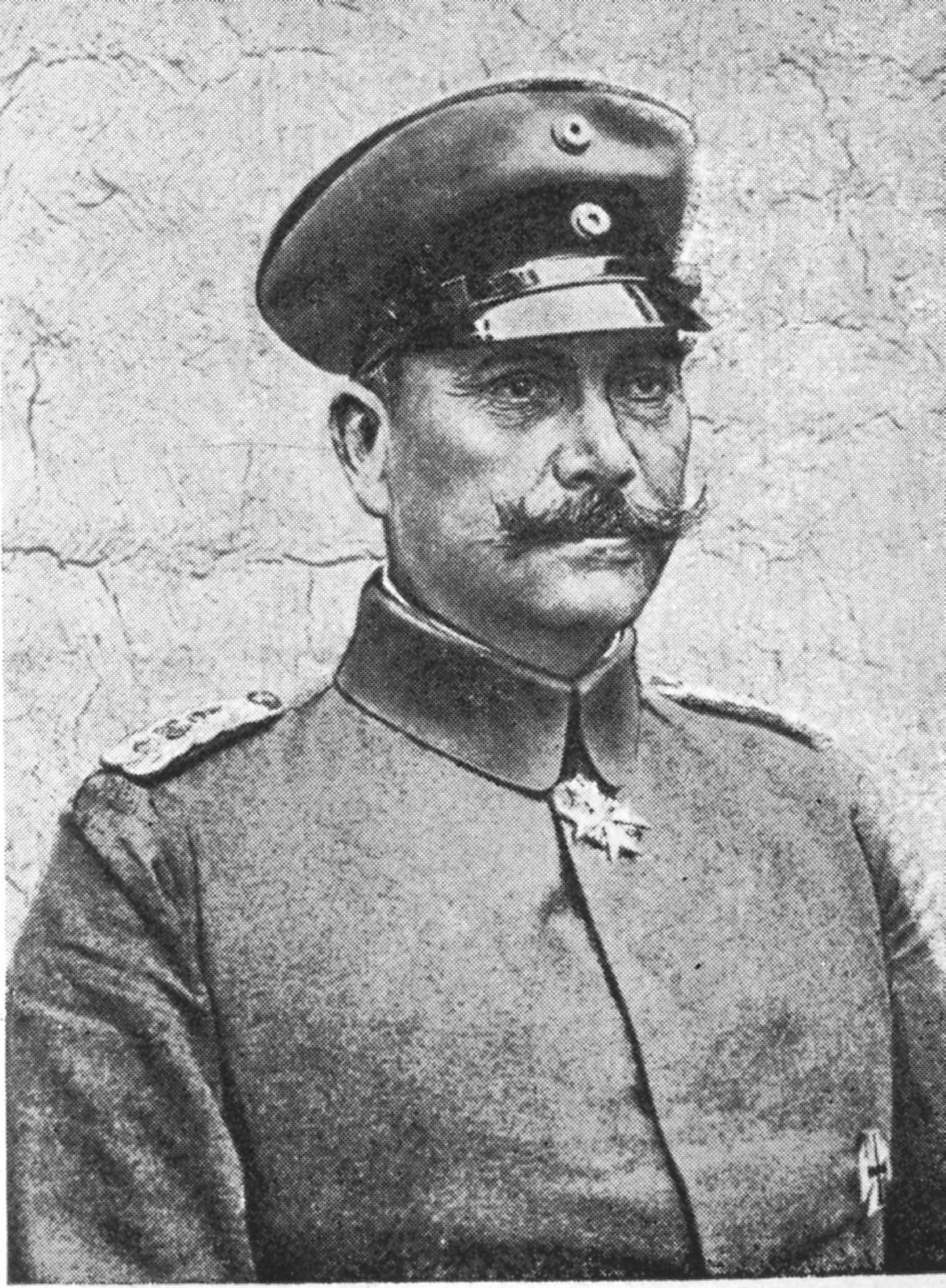
Colonel Georg Bruchmüller, nicknamed Durchbruchmüller as a combination of the German word Durchbruch (breakthrough) with his name, for his fame with using hurricane artillery bombardments for breakthroughs in World War I

The Germans also experimented with short bombardments and barrages. German Colonel Georg Bruchmüller tailored these significantly to integrate well with infiltration tactics. He began to perfect this while serving as a senior artillery officer on the Eastern Front in 1916. Hurricane bombardments avoided giving the defender several days' warning of an impending attack – vital for infiltration tactics. Barrages had to be carefully limited for use with infiltration tactics, as both the barrage movement and infantry advance must keep to a timetable, necessarily very methodical and slow to avoid casualties from friendly artillery; this takes away almost all initiative from the advancing infantry. Barrages with infiltration tactics had to be more intense and precise, and quickly moved to deeper targets. Bruchmüller enforced having artillery aim from the map, avoiding the typical practise of firing several registering shells before a bombardment to adjust the aim of each gun by trial-and-error, alerting the defenders before the full bombardment. Precise aiming without registering shells requires expertise in ballistics with angles and elevation calculated from accurate maps expressly designed for artillery use, knowledge of the effects of altitude and local weather conditions, and also reliable and consistent manufacturing of guns and ammunition to eliminate uncontrolled variation.

Bruchmüller devised intricate, centrally-controlled firing plans for intense bombardments with minimal delays. These plans typically had several bombardment phases. The first phase might be bombardment against enemy communications, telegraph lines, and headquarters, roads and bridges, to isolate and confuse the defenders and delay their reinforcements. The second phase might be against the defenders' artillery batteries and the third against their front-line trenches to drive them back just before the infantry assault on those positions. The last phase was typically a creeping barrage that moved forward of the advancing infantry to quickly bombard positions just before they are attacked. The phases were usually much more complicated, quickly switching between targets to catch defenders off guard; each bombardment plan was carefully tailored to local conditions. The type of shells depended on the target, such as shrapnel, high explosive, smoke, illumination, short-term or lingering gas shells. The total bombardment time was usually from a couple hours down to just minutes.

The creeping barrage phase is often held out as a key part of infiltration tactics, but its use in infiltration attacks is limited by the fact that the rate of infantry advance cannot be predicted. The quickness, intensity, accuracy, and careful selection of targets for maximum effect is more important.

Allied and German styles of bombardments could use tricks of irregular pauses and switching suddenly between targets for short periods of time to avoid being predictable to the defenders.

Bruchmüller's hurricane bombardment tactics in close cooperation with infiltration tactics matured by the time of the German victory at Riga on 3 September 1917, where he served under General Hutier. These bombardment tactics were disseminated throughout the German Army. Hutier and Bruchmüller were transferred together to the Western Front to take part in the Spring Offensive of 1918, where Bruchmüller's artillery tactics had great effect on quickly breaking the British lines for Hutier's 18th Army. Following that initial attack, the artillery had less effect, as infantry forces advanced faster than artillery and munitions could keep up.

After World War I, use of radios to quickly redirect artillery fire as needed removed any exclusive reliance on time-table driven artillery bombardment.

== Dien Bien Phu ==
At the Battle of Dien Bien Phu (1954), Major Marcel Bigeard, commander of the French 6th Colonial Parachute Battalion (6th BPC), used infiltration tactics to defend the besieged garrison against Viet Minh trench warfare tactics. Bigeard's parachute assault companies were supported by concentrated artillery and air support and received help from tanks, allowing two companies (the 1st under Lieutenant René Le Page and the 2nd under Lieutenant Hervé Trapp) numbering no more than 180 men to recapture the important hilltop position of Eliane 1 from a full Viet Minh battalion, on the early morning of 10 April 1954. Other parachute battalion and company commanders also used similar tactics during the battle.

== See also ==
- Military deception
- List of military tactics
- Raid (military)
- Extraction (military)
- Frogman
