= Wilis =

Wilis may refer to:

- Mount Wilis
- Wili, a type of supernatural being in Slavic folklore
  - Giselle or Giselle ou les Wilis, a ballet

== See also ==
- Wili (disambiguation)
- Willis (disambiguation)
- Wills (disambiguation)
