= Stormtroopers (Imperial Germany) =

German WWI shock troops

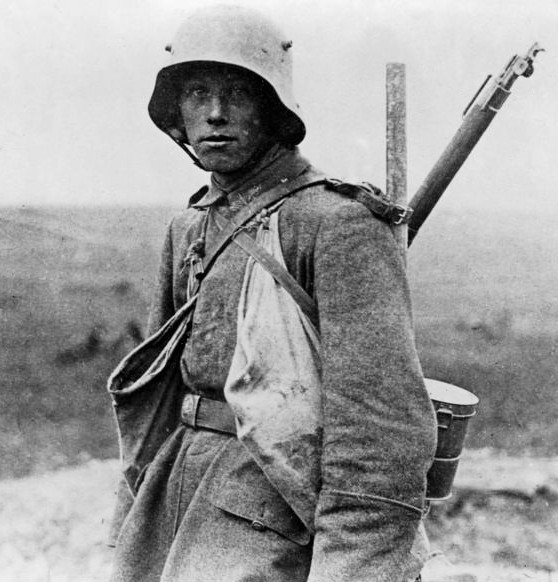
- German stormtrooper on the Western Front wearing a Stahlhelm, with Kar 98a carbine and Stielhandgranate grenade bags, 1916
- Active: 1916–1918
- Country: German Empire
- Branch: Imperial German Army
- Type: Shock troops
- Role: Anti-tank warfare Artillery observer Close-quarters battle Demining; Direct action Hand-to-hand combat Maneuver warfare Patrolling; Raiding; Reconnaissance; Shock tactics Trench warfare
- Size: 17 battalions (as of 1917)
- Colors: Green, grey
- Equipment: MP 18, Karabiner 98a, Luger pistol, Stahlhelm, Stielhandgranate
- Engagements: Western Front of World War I

Commanders
- Notable commanders: Ernst Jünger, Willy Rohr

Stormtroopers (German: Sturmtruppen or Stoßtruppen) were the only elite shock troops of the Imperial German Army (Deutsches Heer) that specialized in commando-style raids, infiltrating the trenches and wiping out the enemy quickly, maneuver warfare, reconnaissance, and shock tactics. In the last years of World War I, Stoßtruppen ('shock troopers' or 'shove troopers') were trained to use infiltration tactics –part of the Germans' improved method of attack on enemy trench warfare.

The German Empire entered the war certain that the conflict would be won in the course of great military campaigns, thus relegating results obtained during individual clashes to the background; consequently the best officers, concentrated in the German General Staff, placed their attention on maneuver warfare and the rational exploitation of railways, rather than concentrating on the conduct of battles. This attitude made a direct contribution to operational victories of Germany in Russia, Romania, Serbia and Italy, but it resulted in failure in the West. Thus the German officers on the Western Front found themselves in need of resolving the static situation caused by trench warfare on the battlefield.

Two concepts can be identified with the attempt to find a solution to the problem. The first was the belief, mainly held by Erich von Falkenhayn, that tactical action alone, the mere killing of enemy soldiers, was a sufficient means to achieve the strategic goal. The second was the idea, emerging from experience of countless "limited target attacks" and forays into the trenches, that combat had become such a difficult task that operational considerations had to be subordinated to tactical ones. The promoter for this last thesis was General der Infanterie Erich Ludendorff who, having become de facto commander of the Imperial German Army after the German defeat at the Battle of Verdun, gave decisive support to the development of assault battalions as a solution to resume maneuver warfare.

The creation of these units was the first, and perhaps the most innovative, attempt by the German army to break out of the impasse of trench warfare. With the use of well-trained soldiers, commanded by NCOs with autonomous decision-making capacity, an attempt was made to traverse no man's land and to break through enemy lines in predefined points in order to allow subsequent waves to liquidate the now confused and isolated opponent, opening large gaps in its defensive systems and then resuming maneuver warfare, which would have allowed Germany to win the conflict.

== History ==
=== Prior to World War I ===
Ever since the introduction of breechloaders, there had been a growing realization that the days of close-order infantry assault were coming to an end. For a time, up to the turn of the 19th century, armies tried to circumvent the problem by moving into range in dispersed formations and charging only the last meters, as the French did in the Second Italian War of Independence (1859), the Prussians in the Austro-Prussian War (1866), or the Germans against the French in the Franco-Prussian War (1870–71).

The advent of the machine gun and the adoption of hydraulic-recoil artillery was a further setback for close order. The showing of the Boers against the British in the Second Boer War (1899–1902) fanned an enthusiasm for "Boer tactics": open order tactics reliant more on achieving fire superiority and moving quickly when enemy fire was ineffective than on positioning oneself for the final bayonet charge.

=== World War I assault tactics ===
In the beginning of the war, the standard assault on a trench line consisted of a prolonged artillery barrage across the opposing line, attempting to smash the enemy positions, followed by a rush forward of infantry in massed lines to overwhelm any remaining defenders. This process either resulted in failure, or at most gained only a short distance, incurring enormous casualties resulting in the armies adopting trench warfare.

=== Development of tactics ===
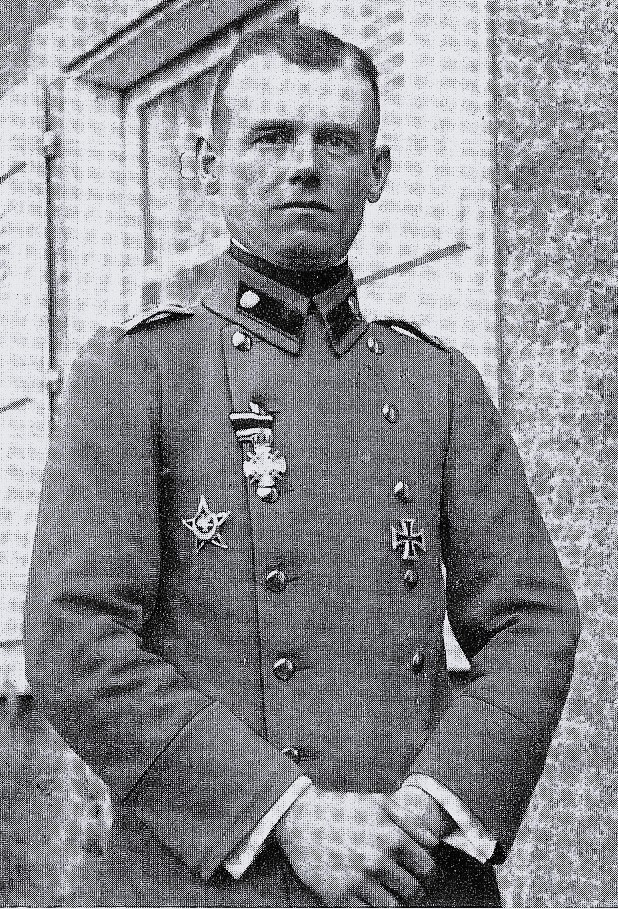
Willy Rohr

The first experimental pioneer assault unit of the German army formed in the spring of 1915, founded by Major Calsow and later commanded and refined by Hauptmann Willy Rohr. These methods further evolved war tactics originally developed by the Prussians, to form the basis of German infiltration tactics. The troops involved were identified as Stoßtruppen (literally: "thrust-troops"), and the term was translated as "storm troops" in English.

Allied versions of infiltration tactics were first formally proposed by French Army captain André Laffargue. In 1915, Laffargue published a pamphlet, "The attack in trench warfare", based upon his experiences in combat that same year. He advocated that the first wave of an attack identify hard-to-defeat defenses but not attack them; subsequent waves would do this. The French published his pamphlet "for information", but did not implement it. The British Empire armies did not translate the pamphlet, and the British Army continued to emphasise fire power, although Laffargue's proposals were gradually adopted informally. The U.S. Infantry Journal published a translation in 1916.

The Germans captured copies of Laffargue's pamphlet in 1916, translating and issuing it to units, but by this point they already had their own, more sophisticated infiltration tactics, over two months before Laffargue's pamphlet was published. The distinction between the German and French tactics was that Laffargue recommended using waves of infantry to attack despite the high casualties that would ensue.

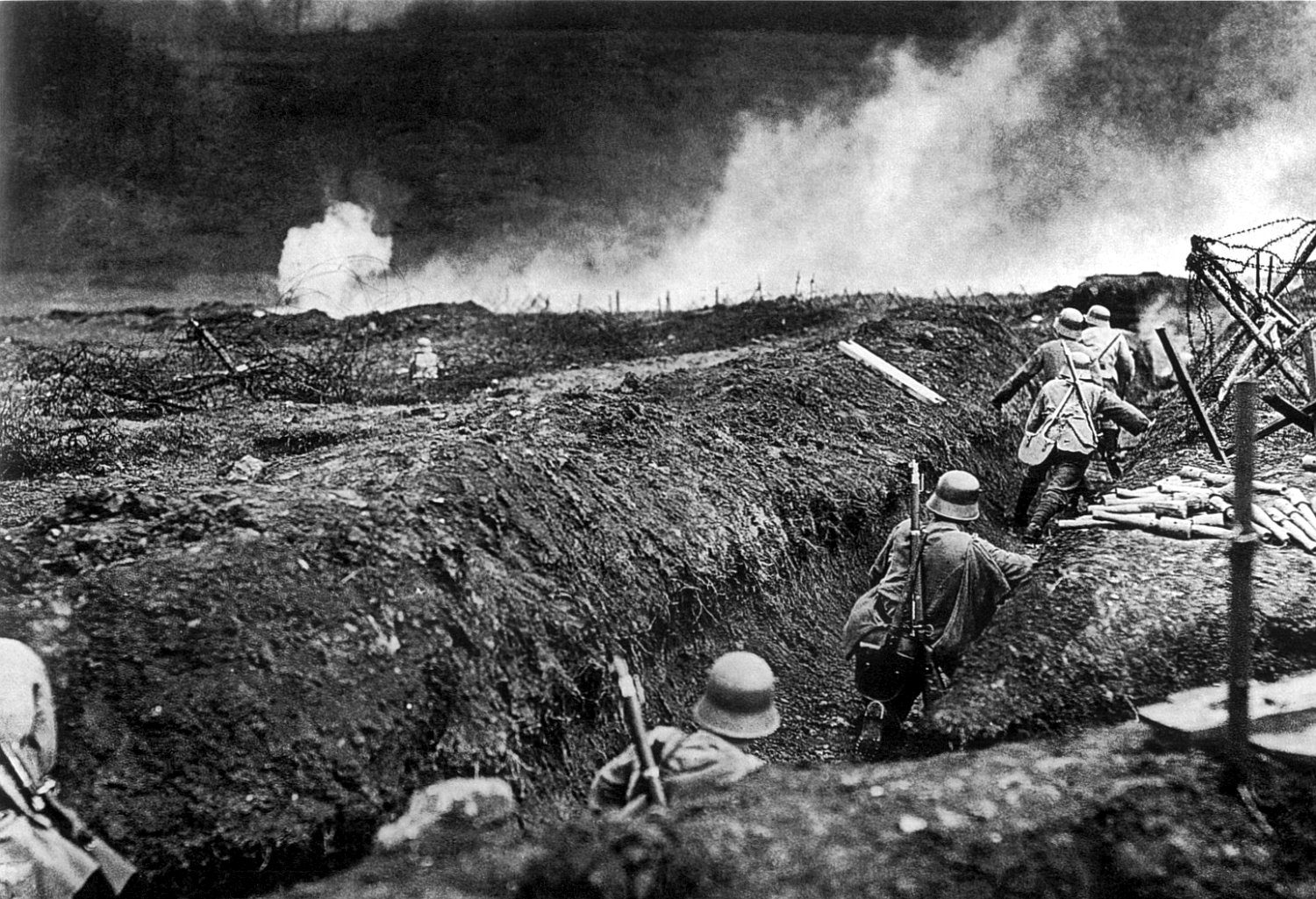
German stormtroopers training in Sedan, France (1917).

Soldiers were trained to consider fire as a means to facilitate movement in progress. Movement would be a call for fire. N. R. McMahon advocated using combined arms in the attack, particularly light machine guns (some six light and two heavy MGs per battalion) using a decentralised fire control and tactical command system (known as Auftragstaktik in German). These methods, suggested in 1909, bore a strong resemblance to the Stoßtrupptaktik used by the Germans six years later.

In February 1917, the British Army issued "Manual SS 143" on the subject. The British made the platoon the basic tactical unit rather than the company as in 1916. The platoon was made up of four sections, Lewis Gun, rifle grenade, grenade, and rifle. The new organisation allowed the platoon to make best use of the trench-fighting equipment that had arrived in adequate quantities since the beginning of the Battle of the Somme. They were also supported by sophisticated artillery flash spotting and sound-ranging, something the German Army never perfected, instead relying on the aural method with ever more accurate measuring devices.

== German stormtroopers ==
=== Calsow Assault Detachment ===
The concept of "stormtroopers" first appeared in March 1915, when the Ministry of War directed the Eighth Army to form Sturmabteilung Calsow ("Calsow's Assault Detachment" or SA Calsow). SA Calsow consisted of a headquarters, two pioneer companies and a 37mm gun (Sturmkanone) battery. The unit was to use heavy shields and body armor as protection in attacks.

However, SA Calsow was never employed in its intended role. Instead it was sent into the line in France as emergency reinforcements during heavy Allied attacks. By June, the unit had already lost half its men. Major Calsow was relieved for this, against his protests that it was not his fault that the unit was not used as intended.

=== Rohr Assault Battalion ===
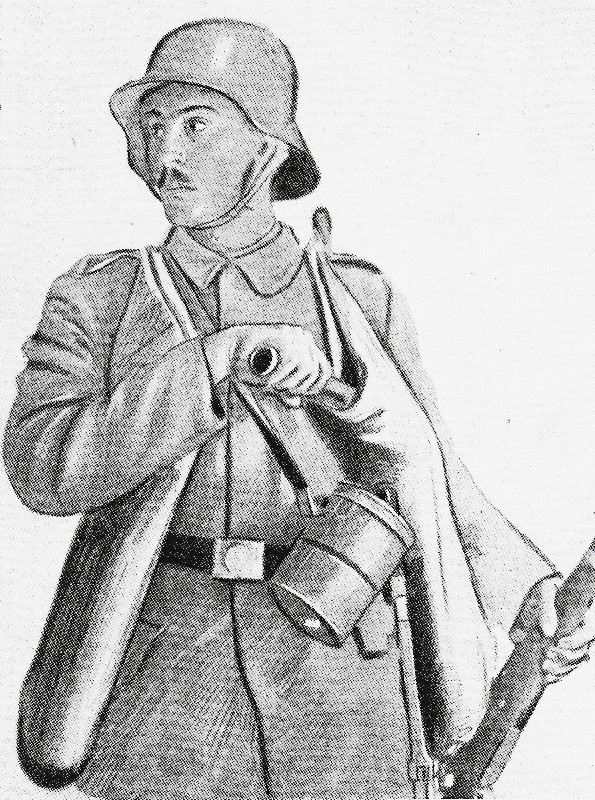
Stormtrooper of the Assault Bataillon Rohr

The new commander of the Assault Detachment from 8 September 1915 was Hauptmann (Captain) Willy Rohr, previously commander of the Guard Rifle Battalion. The Assault Detachment was reinforced with a machine gun platoon and flamethrower platoon. The old infantry support guns had been shown to be too difficult to move across the battlefield, and a new model was developed based on captured Russian 76.2mm fortress guns and issued to the Assault Detachment.

Captain Rohr (later promoted to Major), at first experimented with the Assault Detachment's body armor and shields, but realized that speed was better protection than armor. The only item of armor kept was the Stahlhelm, a new model of steel helmet. It later became the standard in all German units by the end of the war, and was used throughout World War II.

The new tactics developed by Captain Rohr, building much on his own previous experiences from the front, was based on the use of squad sized stormtroops ("Sturmtruppen" or "Stoßtruppen"), supported by a number of heavy support weapons and field artillery that was to be coordinated at the lowest level possible and rolling up enemy trenches using troops armed with hand grenades. These tactics were tested the first time in October 1915 in a successful assault on a French position in the Vosges Mountains.

In December 1915, the Assault Detachment started training men of other German units in the new assault tactics. Around this time the Assault Detachment also changed some of its equipment to better fit its new requirements. Lighter footwear was issued, and uniforms were reinforced with leather patches on knees and elbows to protect them when crawling. Special bags designed to carry grenades replaced the old belts and ammunition pouches, and the standard Gewehr 98 rifle was replaced with the lighter Karabiner 98a previously used by cavalrymen. The stocked artilleryman's pistol/carbine, the 9mm Lange Pistole 08, was also used in concert with an extended 32-round drum magazine to increase the close-range firepower of the unit. The long and impractical épée-style Seitengewehr 98 bayonet was replaced by shorter models, and supplemented with trench knives, clubs, and other melee weapons. While continuing to train other units, the Assault Detachment also participated in many small trench raids and attacks with limited objectives.

The first major offensive led by the new Assault Detachment was the initial German attack at Verdun in February 1916. Stormtroops were in the first wave, leading some units into the French trenches, attacking seconds after the barrage had lifted. This generally worked very well, even though it worked much better against the first trenchline than against the less well-known enemy rear-area.

On 1 April 1916, the Assault Detachment was redesignated "Assault Battalion Rohr". Around this time it was expanded from two to four pioneer companies. At the same time, several Jäger battalions began retraining as new Assault Battalions.

=== Hutier and the last German offensive ===
General Oskar von Hutier, now commanding Eighth Army, became a champion of the new tactics, which became known as Hutier tactics in Britain and by the allies.

Hutier suggested an alternative approach, combining some previous and some new attacks in a complex strategy:

1. A short artillery bombardment, employing heavy shells mixed with numerous poison gas projectiles, to neutralize the enemy front lines, and not try to destroy them.
2. Under a creeping barrage, Stoßtruppen would then move forward, in dispersed order. They would avoid combat whenever possible, infiltrate the Allied defenses at previously identified weak points, and destroy or capture enemy headquarters and artillery strongpoints.
3. Next, infantry battalions with extra light machine guns, mortars and flamethrowers, would attack on narrow fronts against any Allied strongpoints the shock troops missed. Mortars and field guns would be in place to fire as needed to accelerate the breakthrough.
4. In the last stage of the assault, regular infantry would mop up any remaining Allied resistance.

The new assault method had men rushing forward in small groups using whatever cover was available and laying down suppressive fire for other groups in the same unit as they moved forward. The new tactics, which were intended to achieve tactical surprise, were to attack the weakest parts of an enemy's line, bypass his strongpoints and to abandon the futile attempt to have a grand and detailed plan of operations controlled from afar. Instead, junior leaders could exercise initiative on the spot. Any enemy strong points which had not been overrun by stormtroopers could be attacked by the second echelon troops following the stormtroopers.

=== Stormtroopers in 1918 ===
With the withdrawal of Russia, Germany moved troops from the Eastern Front to reinforce the Western Front. This allowed them to take units out of the line for retraining as stormtroopers.

On 21 March 1918, Germany launched Operation Michael, a major offensive, using the new tactics. Four successive German offensives followed and for the first time in four years the stalemate of trench warfare was broken. However, the German advance failed to achieve the complete breakthrough necessary for a decisive result and in July the Allies began their Hundred Days Offensive.

==== Reasons for the failure of the offensive ====
Apart from suffering heavy casualties, several other reasons for the failure of the stormtroops have been suggested.

1. The initial attack was against the British section of the front, which was the most strongly held.
2. The leading units were not relieved or rotated out of action and became exhausted.
3. The terrain contained many rivers, towns, forests and canals which slowed the advance.
4. The 1918 influenza epidemic.
5. The capture of British stores which contained large quantities of alcohol—"not for lack of German fighting spirit, but on account of the abundance of Scottish drinking spirit!"

=== 3rd and 46th Assault Company ===
With three infantry battalions, the German 703rd Infantry Battalion, some machine-gun, cavalry, and artillery units, the 3rd Assault Company, and the 46th Assault Company counterattacked the Egyptian Expeditionary Force during the Sinai and Palestine Campaign. At the First Battle of Amman, during the First Transjordan attack on Amman at the end of March 1918, the attackers were forced back to the Jordan River.

=== 23rd Assault Detachment ===
The assault troops were organised into combined arms assault detachments ... The assault detachment of the 23rd Infantry Division was composed of one infantry company (about 100 men), one engineer (pioneer) platoon (one officer, four NCOs and thirty men), and seven light machine gun teams. The officers assigned to the assault detachments were hand–picked from within the division by the division staff. The assault detachment was given a four–week course in German–style stormtrooper tactics, to which the division sent an additional officer and five NCOs. Eventually the assault detachment was expanded into an assault battalion, giving the 23rd Infantry Division additional combat capability.

=== 24th Assault Company ===
With the 3rd Battalion 145th Infantry Regiment (24th Infantry Division) and the 8th and 9th Cavalry Regiments (3rd Cavalry Division), the 24th Assault Company (24th Infantry Division) pushed the Egyptian Expeditionary Force back from Es Salt at the end of April 1918 during the Second Transjordan attack on Shunet Nimrin and Es Salt.

=== 46th Assault Company ===
This assault company remained in reserve at Amman during the attack on Es Salt.

=== Effect on the Weimar Republic ===
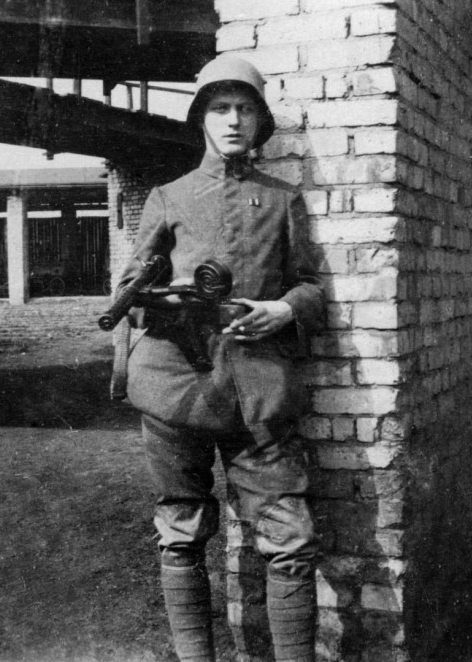
A German soldier armed with an MP 18

According to Vanguard of Nazism by Robert G. L. Waite and Male Fantasies by Klaus Theweleit, some of the psychological and social aspects of the Stormtrooper experience found their way into the paramilitary wings of every political party during the Weimar Republic, which were largely made up of World War I veterans and younger recruits whom they trained. For example, the formal barrier between officers and enlisted men was largely broken down and replaced by a fierce loyalty. There was also a "brutalization" process owing to the uniquely violent conditions of trench warfare. Such units included the monarchist Stahlhelm, the paramilitary Roter Frontkämpferbund wing of the Communist Party of Germany, and the Sturmabteilung, the name of which was commandeered by the Nazi Party for its own paramilitary wing.

== Austro-Hungarian assault units ==
During the winter of 1914–1915, large parts of the Eastern Front switched to trench warfare. To cope with the new situation many Austro-Hungarian regiments spontaneously formed infantry squads called Jagdkommandos. These squads were named after the specially trained forces of Russian army formed in 1886 and were used to protect against ambushes, to perform reconnaissance and for low intensity fights in no-man's-land.

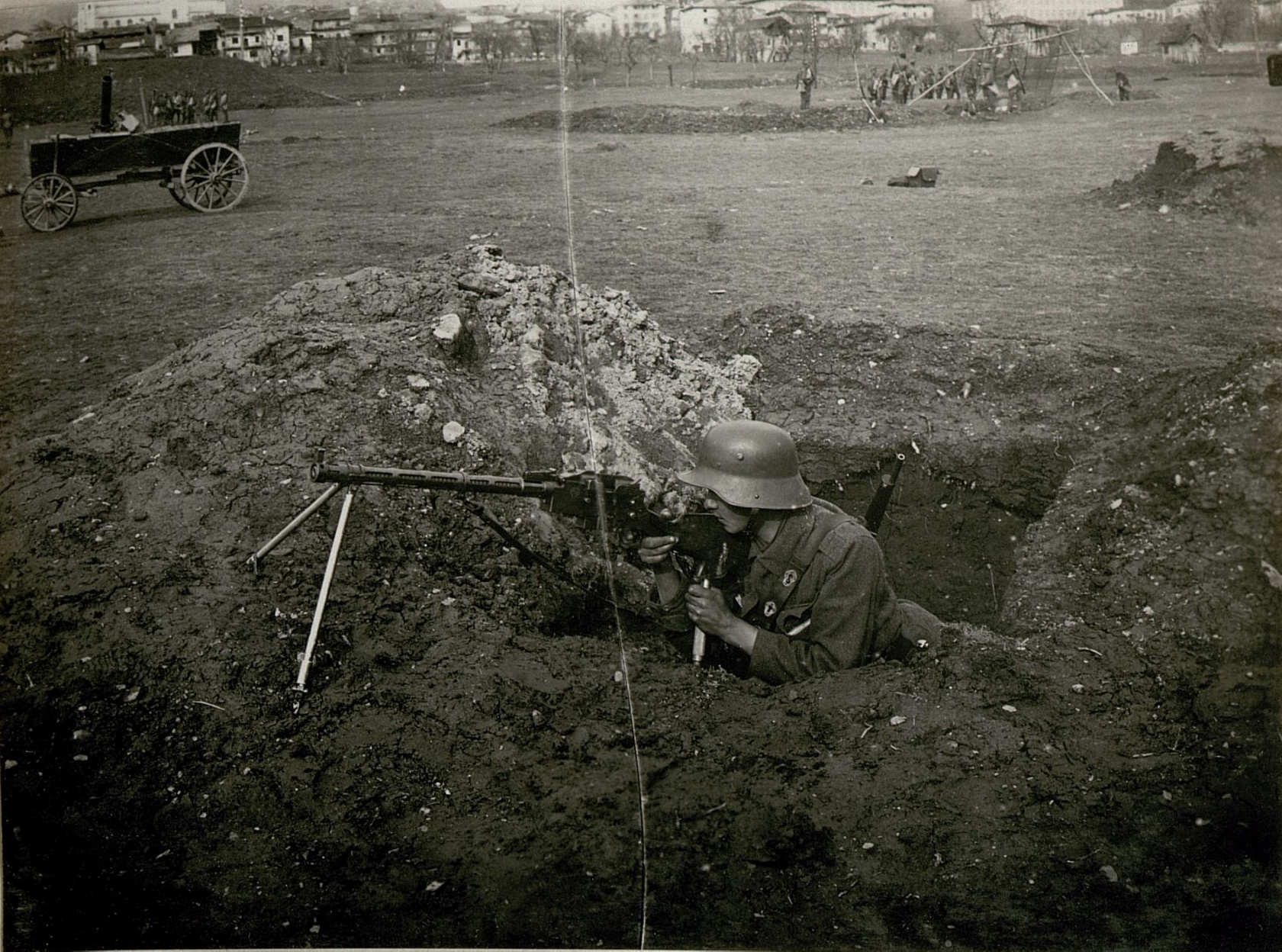
An Austro-Hungarian stormtrooper trains with his Madsen in Levico, March 1917

Austro-Hungarian High army command (Armeeoberkommando, AOK) realised the need for special forces and decided to draw on German experience. Starting in September–October 1916, about 120 officers and 300 NCOs were trained in the German training area in Beuville (near the village of Doncourt) to be the main cadre of the newly raised Austro-Hungarian army assault battalions. The former Jagdkommandos were incorporated into these battalions.

== Ottoman stormtroopers ==
The formation of a storm battalion was ordered by Enver Pasha, the Ottoman Empire's Minister of War, in 1917. In May of that year, a cadre of officers and NCOs were given introductory training in assault techniques at Dubliany in occupied Ukraine, prior to the establishment of the "Constantinople Assault battalion" on 1 July at Maltepe, close to the capital. The first troops to arrive for training were deemed to be too old and many were barefoot, so more suitable recruits were selected from other units. With the aid of German instructors, the troops were trained in the use of weapons such as flamethrowers, known to the Turks as "hellfire machines", and 7.58 cm Minenwerfer mortars. Ottoman troops had never been issued with steel helmets, so German M1916 helmets were ordered but with the visors and neck-guards removed because they were thought to make it difficult to hear orders in the field.

During the Middle Eastern theatre of World War I, especially in Sinai and Palestine Campaign, Ottomans utilized this storm battalion which formed part of the Yıldırım Army Group using the latest Western Front infiltration tactics and close combat gear with concentrated fire of artillery and machine guns. A notable action by this unit was at the Battle of El Burj on 1 December 1917, when they dislodged two squadrons of the 3rd Australian Light Horse from their defensive positions on a ridge, but were halted and isolated when British reinforcements arrived.

== See also ==
- Arditi
