= Willye =

Willye is a given name. Notable people with the name include:

- Willye Dennis (1926–2012), American activist and politician
- Willye White (1939–2007), American track and field athlete

== See also ==
- Willy, given name
