= William Martinez =

William Martinez or Martínez may refer to:

- William Martinez (actor) (born 1966), Filipino actor
- William Martínez (footballer) (1928–1997), Uruguayan footballer
- Will Martinez (born 1980), American mixed martial artist
- William J. Martínez (born 1954), American federal judge

== See also ==
- Williams Martínez (born 1982), Uruguayan footballer
- Willie Martinez (disambiguation)
