= Willi =

Willi is a given name, nickname (often a short form or hypocorism of Wilhelm) and surname. Notable people with the name include:

== Given name ==
- Willi Apel (1893–1988), German-American musicologist
- Willi Boskovsky (1909–1991), Austrian violinist and conductor
- Willi Forst (1903–1980), born Wilhelm Anton Frohs, Austrian actor, screenwriter, film director, film producer and singer
- Willi Hennig (1913–1976), German biologist
- Willi Lesch (born 1942), German alpine skier
- Willi Liebherr (born 1947), German-Swiss businessman and billionaire
- Willi Smith (1948–1987), African-American fashion designer
- Willi Tiefel, German footballer
- Willi Ziegler (1929–2002), German paleontologist

== Nickname ==
- Willi Graf (1918–1943), German member of the White Rose anti-Nazi resistance group, under consideration for sainthood
- Willi Münzenberg (1889–1940), German communist political activist and publisher
- Willi Orbán (born 1992), German-Hungarian footballer
- Willi Ostermann (1876–1936), German lyricist, composer and singer of carnival songs and songs about Cologne
- Willi Schmid (1893–1934), German music critic
- Willi Stoph (1914–1999), East German politician
- Willi Tokarev (1934–2019), Russian and former expatriate Russian-American singer-songwriter
- Willi Weber (born 1942), manager of German racing drivers

== Surname ==
- Andrea Willi (born 1955), politician from Liechtenstein, first woman Minister of Foreign Affairs
- Andreas Willi (born 1972), Swiss linguist, philologist and classicist
- Herbert Willi (born 1956), Austrian composer of classical music
- Monika Willi (born 1968), Austrian film editor
- Patricia Willi (born 1991), Swiss footballer

== See also ==
- Wili (disambiguation)
- Willy (disambiguation)
- William (given name)
