= Willy (surname) =

Willy or Willie is the surname of:

- Charles V. Willie (1927–2022), American sociologist and writer
- David Willey (born 1986), former England cricketer
- Drew Willy (born 1986), American football quarterback
- Nikita Willy (born 1994), Indonesian actress and pop singer
- Robert Lee Willie (1958–1984), American executed kidnapper, rapist and murderer
- Sarah Willie-LeBreton, née Willie, American sociologist and academic administrator
- Theophilus Albert Willy (1845–1916), American politician
- William Willy (1703?–1765), English politician, Member of Parliament from 1747 to his death
