= Willie Lake =

Lake in the state of Minnesota, United States

- Location within Minnesota
- Location: Meeker County, Minnesota
- Coordinates: 45°0′22″N 94°29′53″W
- Type: lake

Willie Lake is a private lake in Meeker County, in the U.S. state of Minnesota. It stretches over 191 acres and is 17 feet deep at its deepest point. It was named for U. S. Willie (or Wiley), a state legislator.

== See also ==
- List of lakes in Minnesota
