= Willies =

Willies may refer to:

- Willies, Nord, a commune in the Nord department in northern France
- The Willies (album), a 2002 album by Bill Frisell
- The Willies (film), a 1990 American comedy/horror anthology
- Willies Ice Cream, a company in Trinidad and Tobago
- Willies Mchunu, South African politician

== See also ==
- Willys, a U.S. brand of car
- Willy (disambiguation)
