= Wili =

Wili, WILI or Willi may refer to:

== People ==
- Heinrich Willi, who described Prader–Willi syndrome
- Herbert Willi (born 1956), Austrian composer
- Wili Jønsson, member of the Danish rock band Gasolin'

== Other uses ==
- WILI (AM), a radio station in Willimantic, Connecticut, United States
- WILI-FM, a radio station (98.3 FM) licensed to Willimantic, Connecticut, United States
- "Wili, Pt. 2" and "Wili, Pt. 3", tracks on the Green Day album Dark Magus
- Wilis, a Slavic folklore feminine spirit that dances men to death
- Wili Co Ltd, a Private company in Viet Nam.

== See also ==
- Harold Lamont Otey (1951–1994) or "Walkin' Wili", the first person executed since 1976 in Nebraska
- Wiliwili (Erythrina sandwicensis), a species of flowering tree in the pea family, Fabaceae
- Wilis (disambiguation)
- Willi, a given name
- Willy (disambiguation)
