= Shock troops =

Type of infantry for leading attacks

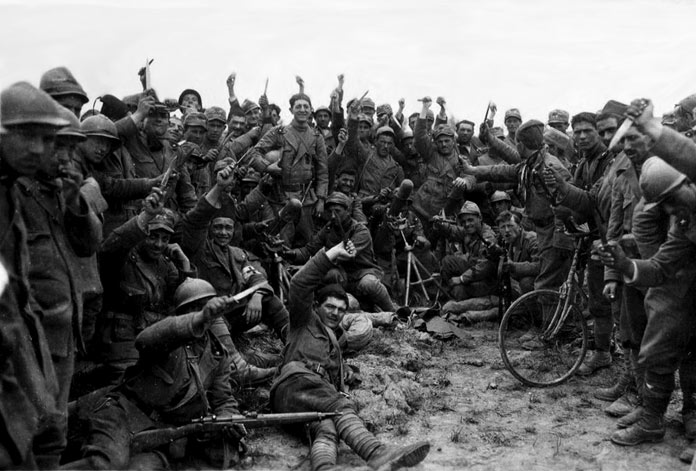
Members of the Italian Arditi corps circa 1918

Shock troops, assault troops, or storm troops are special formations created to lead military attacks. They are often better trained and equipped than other military units and are expected to take heavier casualties even in successful operations.

"Shock troop" is a loose translation of the German word Stoßtrupp (literally "thrust squad" or "push squad"). (Note: Although the German word Stoß is occasionally used to translate 'shock' or allude to a shock-like event, as in Erdstoß (seismic wave), in this case stoß derives directly from the verb stoßen (to push), referring to the original task of the Stoßtruppen, known in German as vorstoßen (roughly: to carry the attack forward, to penetrate the enemy lines).) Assault troopers are typically organized for mobility with the intention that they will penetrate enemy defenses and attack into the enemy's vulnerable rear areas. Any specialized, elite unit formed to fight an engagement via overwhelming assault (usually) would be considered shock troops, as opposed to "special forces" or commando-style units (intended mostly for covert operations). However, both types of units could fight behind enemy lines, by surprise if required.

== Before 1914 ==
The Companion cavalry of Alexander the Great (356-326 BC) are described as being the first example of shock cavalry being used in Europe.

During the Paraguayan War (1864–1870), in which Paraguay fought against Brazil, Argentina, and Uruguay, the Paraguayans deployed shock troops (composed of a mixture of dismounted cavalry and fit men who could row and swim) armed with sabres, cutlasses, knives, bayonets, pistols, and hand grenades. They attacked small fortified positions and boarded Brazilian river steamers.

== World War I ==
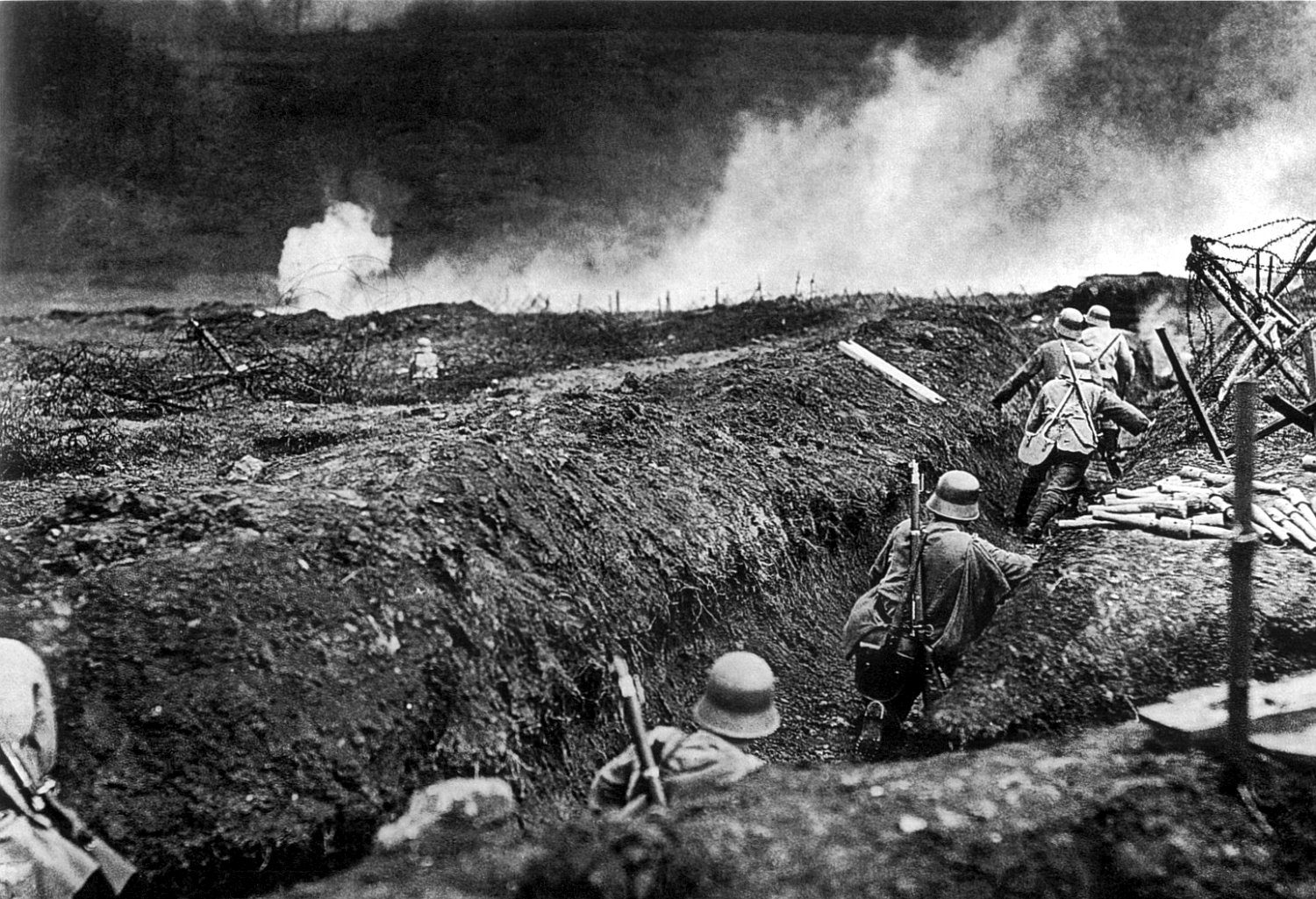
German storm troops training in Sedan (May 1917)

During World War I, many combatants faced the deadlock of trench warfare. On the Western Front in 1915, the Germans formed a specialized unit called the Rohr Battalion to develop assault tactics. During the Brusilov offensive of 1916, the Russian general Aleksei Brusilov developed and implemented the idea of shock troops to attack weak points along the Austrian lines to effect a breakthrough, which the main Imperial Russian Army could then exploit. The army had also formed hunter commando units in 1886 and used them in World War I to protect against ambushes, to perform reconnaissance and for low-intensity fights in no-man's-land.

The von Hutier tactics (infiltration tactics) called for special infantry assault units to be detached from the main lines and sent to infiltrate enemy lines, supported by shorter and sharper (than usual for WWI) artillery fire missions targeting both the enemy front and rear, bypassing and avoiding what enemy strong points they could, and engaging to their best advantage when and where they were forced to, leaving decisive engagement against bypassed units to following heavier infantry. The primary goal of these detached units was to infiltrate the enemy's lines and break their cohesion as much as possible. These formations became known as Stoßtruppen, or shock troops, and the tactics they pioneered were the basis of post-WWI infantry tactics, such as the development of fire teams.

The same sort of tactical doctrine was widely espoused in British and French service in late 1917 and 1918, with variable results. The British Army standard training manual for platoon tactics, SS 143, was used from February 1917 onwards and contained much of what was standard for German shock troops.

== See also ==
- Forlorn hope
- Special forces
- Ghatak Platoon with Indian Army
- Assault Engineering Brigades
- Stormtroopers (Imperial Germany)
- Palmach stands for Plugot Maḥatz, "Strike Companies"
