= Willie Martinez =

Willie Martinez is the name of:

- Willie Martínez (baseball) (born 1978), baseball pitcher
- Willie Martinez (jockey) (born 1971), horse racing jockey
- Willie Martinez (American football) (born 1963), defensive backs coach

== See also ==
- William Martinez (disambiguation)
