= Willie Norwood (disambiguation) =

Willie Norwood may refer to:

- Willie Norwood, gospel singer
- Willie Norwood (basketball), basketball player
- Willie Norwood (baseball), baseball player
