= Willy Rohr =

German Army officer (1877–1930)

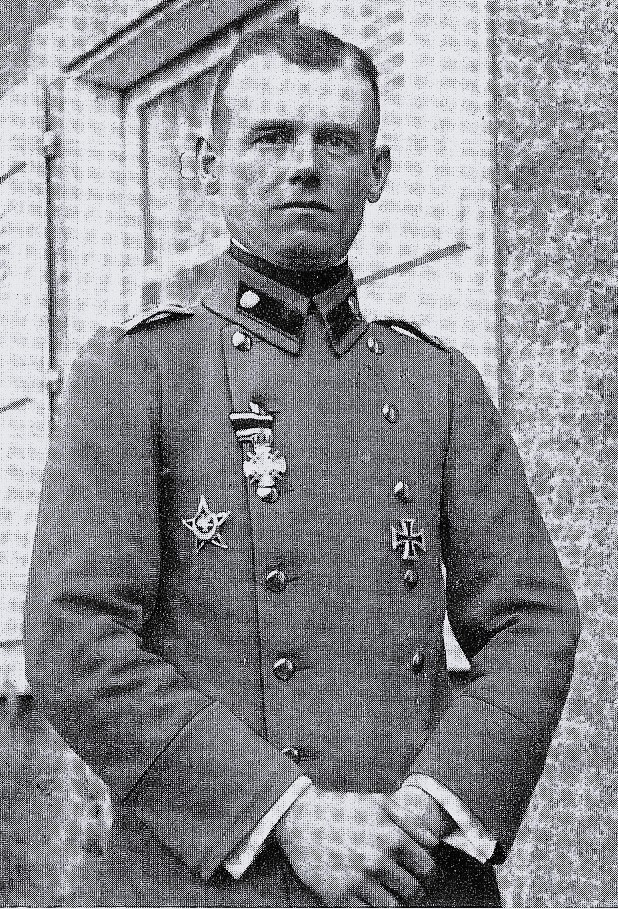
- Captain Rohr (1917)
- Born: 19 May 1877; Metz, Alsace-Lorraine, German Empire
- Died: 8 March 1930 (aged 52); Lübeck, Weimar Republic
- Military career
- Allegiance: German Empire; Weimar Republic
- Branch: Prussian Army; Reichsheer
- Service years: 1896–1921
- Rank: Lieutenant colonel
- Conflicts: World War I

Willy Martin Ernst Rohr (19 May 1877 – 8 March 1930) was a German Army officer who was a major contributor to the development of infantry tactics in World War I, particularly for the system of Storm Battalions.

== Biography ==
Willy Rohr attended a military school in Bensberg and Karlsruhe before he transferred to the Prussian Hauptkadettenanstalt (Central Officer's Training School) in Lichterfelde, Berlin. He joined the 3rd Magdeburg Infantry Regiment No. 66 as a second lieutenant in 1896. From 1899 to 1903, Rohr was assigned to NCO School in Potsdam and became a battalion adjutant and later a regimental adjutant. In 1906, he was promoted as a first lieutenant. After working as a teacher in the infantry shooting school in Wünsdorf from 1911-1912, Rohr was transferred to the 10th Rhineland Infantry Regiment No. 161 in Trier and was promoted as a captain. At his request, in 1913, he was transferred to the Guards Rifle Battalion in Gross-Lichterfelde and served as the commander of the 3rd Company.

=== World War I ===
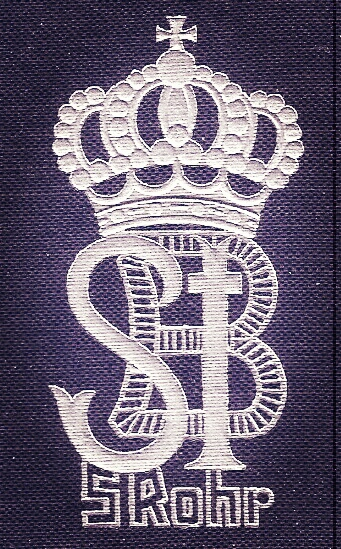
Sturm-Bataillon Nr. 5 (Rohr)

In World War I he fought in 3rd Company on the Aisne, in Champagne and on the Hartmannsweiler Kopf. In 1915, Rohr was transferred to the Major Calsow detachment and formed the Loretto Front with two pioneer companies. These fought unsuccessfully, the battalions were renamed the Sturmabteilung Calsow, and their leadership found other employment in the Armeeabteilung Gaede. The decimated storm detachment was recalled to the Kaiserstuhl. By command of General von Falkenhayn the captain, who had been brought in from the Guards Rifle Battalion, was temporarily entrusted with their command on 30 August 1915. The previously unused Kaiserstuhl became a training center.

The effectiveness of the detachment was improved by reequipping it with machine guns and flamethrowers. Rohr introduced the steel helmet, already used by the enemy, to his Storm Battalion or Shock Troop. Rohr's newly developed tactics were based on his experience at the front and made a great contribution to the development of assault team tactics. Major Reddemann was the first to designate the existing flamethrower squads as shock troops. They are both regarded as originators of the concept of shock troops.

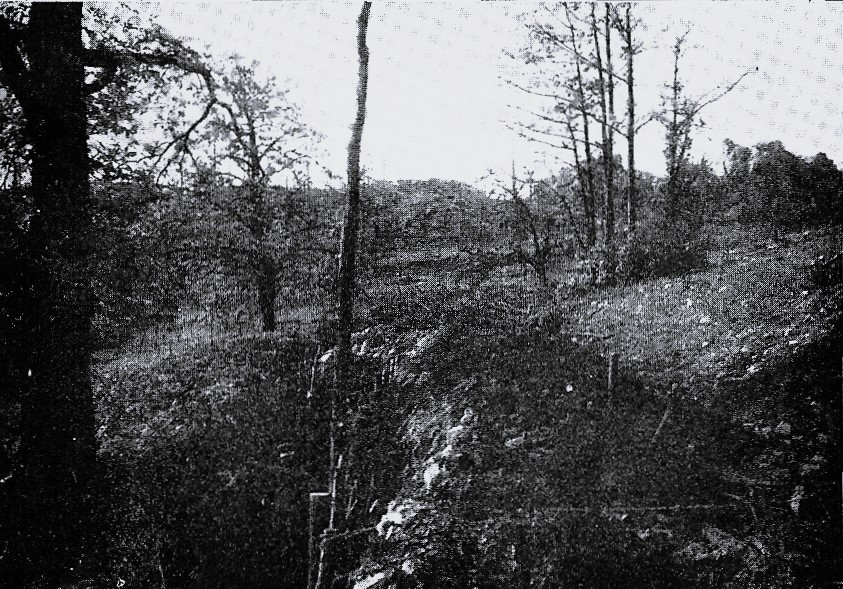
Hirzstein

Rohr neglected the tactical training of the army up to the Battle of Verdun. The successful testing of the new methods was carried out by Infantry Regiment No. 187 west of Colmar in the Vosges. The Sturmabteilung Rohr was committed to the re-conquest of the Hartmannsweiler Kopf in December 1915. When its next deployment, the attack on the Hirzstein, failed, it withdrew to carry out more intensive preparations. After completion of the preparations, the place was captured with the help of two regiments inexperienced in battle, Nos. 188 and 189, in January 1916. By successfully employing the Storm Detachment in various sectors of the front, Army Detachment Gaede trained itself and the stationary troops. In December 1915, the first training course in the technique was held in the general's presence on the Schlossberg at Achkarren As a result of its success the detachment was moved in February 1916 to the 5th Army (Crown Prince Wilhelm) to take part in the Verdun offensive.

Because of its high losses resulting from the lack of cooperation of the units, the detachment had to be withdrawn after a short time. Captain Rohr spoke at the command post of General-Commando 3 (GKo 3) in Nouillon-Pont on 13 March 1916, before General von Lochow, the Chief of Staff, Colonel Wetzell and Ia Major von Stülpnagel. When asked about the failure of the daily attacks, Rohr attributed it primarily to the infantry's inexperience with hand-to-hand fighting. Hand grenades had been left lying in the woods; the infantry had not touched these because they had not been trained in their use. Also he considered the cooperation between the infantry and their accompanying weapons, such as machine guns and light mortars, to be insufficient. As a result, he was ordered to repeat his comments as soon as possible to the personnel of the Army High Command (AOK 5). He was then given the task of training the divisions of the army in "modern close combat".

After an inspection by the Crown Prince and by order of the Minister of War, the Storm Detachment was expanded to a battalion and given the name "Storm Battalion". For teaching purposes, the battalion built a practice fort in the forest near the ruined village of Doncourt. Here until the war ended, thousands of German and Austrian officers were trained. Besides its use for a teaching force, the battalion was repeatedly sent to hotspots on the Western Front. Rohr made a report directly to the emperor on the storming of the Souville Gorge on 3 September 1916. The battalion was designated a favorite battalion of the emperor. At the request of the Crown Prince Army Group, on 7 February 1917, the battalion received the designation Sturm-Bataillon Nr. 5 (Rohr) from the War Ministry. At the same time Willy Rohr became chief training officer.

Since it was the first and most successful storm battalion, its number of "5" instead of "1" came from the army it served in. In January 1918, Rohr was assigned command of the first deutsche Sturm-Panzer-Kraftwagen-Abteilung (German Armored Vehicle Detachment), a tank unit. Both the slowness and clumsiness of the vehicles were regarded as defects. Rohr went on 11 March 1918 to AOK 18, the 18th Army headquarters, in Leschelle to make preparations for a major attack, Operation Michael. His battalion arrived during the night of March 19. In April Rohr was promoted to major. Under secret marching orders the battalion was sent in mid-October 1918 to Spa. It was assigned to guard the Große Hauptquartier and Oberste Heeresleitung (Supreme Army Headquarters). When the emperor fled 48 hours later, Major Rohr obtained approval from OHL and left Spa with his battalion in the direction of Germany. A large part of the battalion was demobilized in Schwelm.

=== Postwar ===
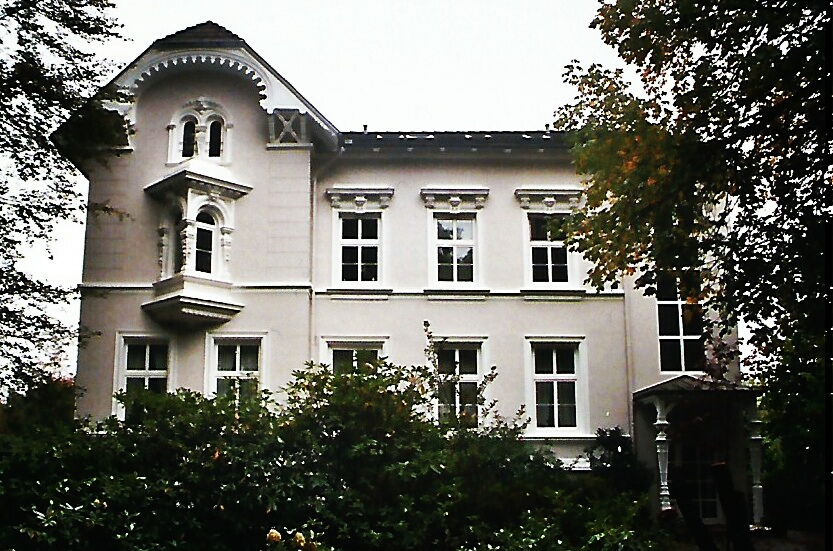
Residence of the Director of Lübecker Getreidebank

After the war Rohr was assigned in 1920 to Reichswehr Infantry Regiment 29 of the Provisional Reichswehr. With the formation to the 100,000-man army in 1921, he was dismissed and put at its disposition under the title of a lieutenant colonel. Since the major received no suitable command in the Reichswehr and had to take supply jobs on the staff, he decided to officially resign his post. Thus the Reichswehr deprived itself of one of its most capable soldiers. Rohr found a new home in Lübeck, where he died while a director of the Lübecker Getreidebank.

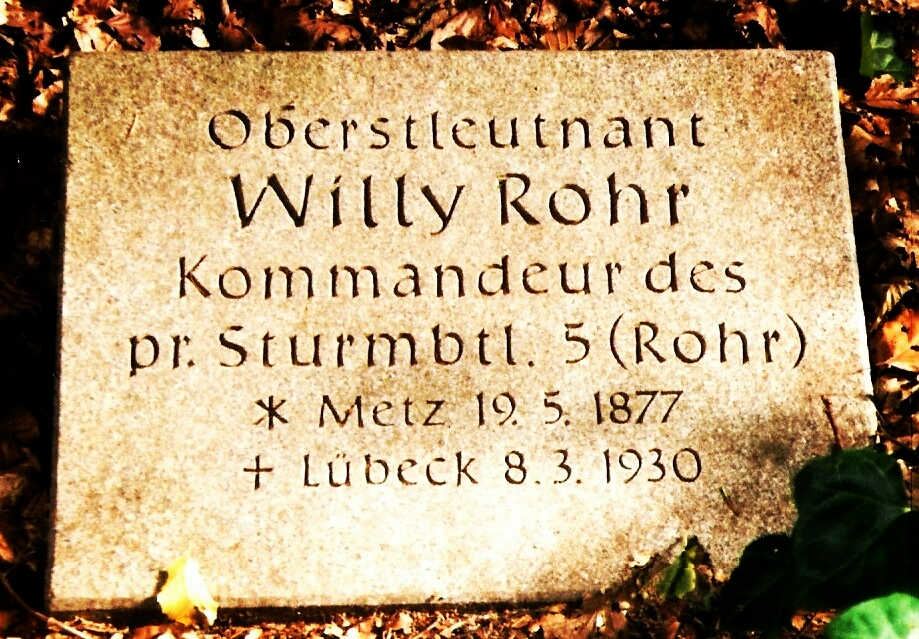
Grave in memorial cemetery in Lübeck

== Decorations ==
- Order of the Crown, 4th class
- Iron Cross, 1st and 2nd Class
- Knight of Dannebrog
- Knight of the Order of Isabella the Catholic
- Spanish Order of Military Merit, 1st Class
- Knights Cross with Swords of the House Order of Hohenzollern
- Gallipoli Star

== Writings ==
- Anweisung für die Ausbildung beim Sturm-Bataillon. (English: Instructions for Storm Battalion Training).
