= Bill (given name) =

- Bill Clinton's official portrait
- Pronunciation: /ˈbɪl/ BILL
- Gender: Male
- Language: English

Origin
- Languages: 1. Germanic; 2. English
- Origin: Diminutive form of William
- Region of origin: English-speaking world

Other names
- Alternative spelling: Billy; Bil
- Related names: William, Billy, Billie, Will, Willy

Bill is a masculine given name, generally a short form (hypocorism) of William. It can also be used as the adaptation into English of the popular Greek name Vasilis or Vasileios (Basil), especially amongst Greek immigrants in English-speaking countries, probably due to similarity in the sound.

People named Bill include:

- Bill Ackman (born 1966), American billionaire hedge fund manager
- Bill Allen, multiple people
- Bill Allison, multiple people
- Bill Anderson (born 1937), American singer, songwriter, and television host
- Bill Ayers (born 1944), American professor and militant organizer
- Bill Bailey (born 1965), British actor, comedian, presenter and musician.
- Bill Barr (born 1950), Former Attorney General of the United States
- Bill Barrett, multiple people
  - Bill Barrett (1929–2016), American politician
- Bill Barretta (born 1964), American actor and puppeteer
- Bill Belichick (born 1952), head coach/general manager of the NFL's New England Patriots since 2000
- Bill Bennett (1932–2015), Canadian politician
- Bill Berry, multiple people
  - Bill Berry (born 1958), American musician
- Bill Bixby (1934–1993), American actor and director
- Bill Bowerman (1911–1999), American co-founder of Nike, Inc
- Bill Bowman (racing driver) (1935–2008), American racing driver
- Bill Bradley (born 1943), American politician and basketball player
- Bill Browder (born 1964), American-born English financier and political activist
- Bill Bruford (born 1949), English drummer and percussionist
- Bill Bryson (1898–1973), Australian politician
- Bill Bryson (born 1951), UK-based American author
- Bill Bryson Sr. (1915–1986), American journalist
- Bill Buckner (1949–2019), American baseball player
- Bill Buford (born 1954), American author and journalist
- Bill Burr (born 1968), American comedian
- Bill Butts (born 1937), American racing driver
- Bill Callahan (American football coach) (born 1956), American football coach
- Bill Camp (born 1963/1964), American actor.
- Bill Carson, multiple people
- Bill Cassidy (born 1957), American physician and politician
- Bill Champlin (born 1947), American musician
- Bill Charlap (born 1966), American jazz pianist
- Bill Clinton (born 1946), 42nd President of the United States
- Bill Conti (born 1942), American composer and conductor
- Bill Cosby (born 1937), American stand-up comedian, actor, musician and author who was convicted of sexual assault
- Bill Cowher (born 1957), American retired National Football League head coach and player
- Bill Craver (1844–1901), American baseball player
- Bill Croskey-Merritt (born 2001), American football player
- Bill Cullen (1920–1990), American radio and television personality
- Bill de Blasio (born 1961), American politician, Mayor of New York City
- Bill Decker (sheriff), Dallas County sheriff
- Bill DeMott (born 1966), American professional wrestler, road agent, and trainer
- Bill Doran, multiple people
- Bill Dromo (1937–2012), Canadian professional wrestler
- Bill Duke (born 1943), American actor and filmmaker
- Bill DuLac (born 1951), American football player
- Bill Edwards, multiple people
- Bill Elliott (born 1955), American racing driver
- Bill Engvall (born 1957), American stand-up comedian, actor, and television host
- Bill Evans (1929–1980), American jazz pianist
- Bill Fagerbakke (born 1957), American voice actor
- Bill Farmer (born 1952), American voice actor
- Bill Finger (1914–1974), American comic strip, comic book, film and television writer, best known for co-creating Batman.
- Bill Foster, multiple people
- Bill Frist (born 1952), American politician
- Bill Gaither (born 1936), American singer and songwriter
- Bill Gates
  - Bill Gates (born 1955), American business magnate, investor, author, philanthropist, and co-founder of Microsoft
- Bill Goldberg (born 1966), American professional NFL football player and professional wrestler
- Bill Graham, multiple people
- Bill Gray (born 1975 or 1976), birth name of American gay pornographic actor Billy Santoro
- Bill Gustoff (born 1968), American politician and attorney
- Bill Hader (born 1978), American comedian
- Bill Haley (1929–1981), American musician
- Bill Hanson (basketball) (born c. 1940), basketball player
- Bill Harris, multiple people
- Bill Haslam (born 1958), American businessman and politician
- Bill Haywood (1869–1928), American labor organizer
- Bill Hemmer (born 1964), American journalist
- Bill Hickman (1921–1986), American actor, stunt driver, stunt coordinator
- Bill Hicks (1961–1994), American comedian
- Bill Hybels (born 1951), American church figure and author
- Bill Iffrig (1934–2024), American marathon runner
- Bill Irwin (born 1950), American actor, best known for playing Mr. Noodle on Sesame Street
- Bill Ivey (1944–2025), American folklorist and author
- Bill James
  - Bill James (born 1949), American baseball writer
- Bill Janklow (1939–2012), American lawyer and politician
- Bill Kaulitz (born 1989), German singer and songwriter (Tokio Hotel)
- Bill Kelliher (born 1971), American guitarist for heavy metal band Mastodon
- Bill Kerr (1922–2014), Australian actor, comedian, and vaudevillian
- Bill Knowlton (1898–1944), American baseball player
- Bill Kristol (born 1952), American political writer
- Bill Kurtis (born 1940), American TV personality
- Bill Laimbeer (born 1957), American professional basketball coach and player
- Bill Lane, multiple people
- Bill Larsen (1928–1993), American magician
- Bill Larson, multiple people
- Bill Lear (1902–1978), American inventor and businessman, founder of the Lear Jet Corporation
- Bill Lennon (1845–1910), American baseball player
- Bill Maher
  - Bill Maher (born 1956), American comedian, political commentator and television host
- Bill McKibben (born 1960), American environmentalist, author, and journalist
- Bill Medley (born 1940), American singer and songwriter, half of The Righteous Brothers
- Bill Miller, multiple people
- Bill Miner (c. 1847 – 1913), American Old West stagecoach and train robber
- Bill Mitchell (born 1960), American politician
- Bill Morgan, multiple people
- Bill Moyers (1934–2025), American journalist and political commentator
- Bill Murray
  - Bill Murray (born 1950), American actor, comedian, and writer
- Bill Nelson, American politician, former US Senator
- Bill Nicholson, multiple people
- Bill Nighy (born 1949), British actor
- Bill Norton (born 2000), American football player
- Bill Nunn, multiple people
- Bill Nye
  - Bill Nye (born 1955), American science communicator, television presenter and mechanical engineer, known as "Bill Nye the Science Guy"
- Bill O'Reilly
- Bill Oakley (born 1966), American TV writer and producer
- Bill Oberst Jr., an American stage, film, and television actor
- Bill Oddie (1941–2026), English conservationist, entertainer, and ornithologist
- Bill Osborne (racing driver) (1946–2009), American racing driver
- Bill Owen (1914–1999), English actor
- Bill Parcells (born 1941), American former National Football League head coach
- Bill Paxton (1955–2017), American actor and director
- Bill Peet (1915–2002), American author and animator
- Bill Potts, multiple people
- Bill Prady (born 1960), American television writer and producer
- Bill Presser, high-ranking official in the Teamsters union and a participant in organized crime
- Bill Pullman (born 1953), American actor
- Bill Pulte (born 1988), American businessman
- Bill Putnam (1920–1989), American audio engineer
- Bill Putnam (basketball) (1922–1992), American basketball player
- Bill Ramsey (1931–2021), German-American singer and actor
- William Robinson, which includes several Bills
  - Bill Robinson (1878–1949), African-American tap dancer and actor nicknamed "Bojangles"
- Bill Russell (1934–2022), American Hall-of-Fame retired National Basketball Association player
- Bill Schuette (born 1953), American lawyer and politician
- Bill Schwarz British historian, academic and writer
- Bill Shankly (1913–1981), British Soccer Manager
- Bill Shirley (1921–1989), American actor and singer
- Bill Shorten (born 1967), Australian politician and former trade unionist
- Bill Simmons (born 1969), American podcaster, sportswriter, and cultural critic
- Bill Skarsgård (born 1990), Swedish actor known for portraying Pennywise the dancing clown
- Bill Smith (born 1998), American MMA fighter
- Bill Snyder (born 1936), American football player and coach
- Bill Stearns (1853–1898), American baseball player
- Bill Stemmyer (1865–1945), American professional baseball player
- Bill Stevenson, multiple people
- Bill Sweek (born 1946/1947), American basketball player and coach
- Bill Tasillo (1889–1945), American bandleader and promoter
- Bill Thompson, multiple people
- Bill Tilden (1893–1953), American tennis player
- Bill Turnbull (1956–2022), British broadcaster and journalist
- Bill Vander Zalm (born 1934), Canadian politician
- Bill W. (1895–1971), co-founder of Alcoholics Anonymous
- Bill Walker (born 1987), American basketball player
- Bill Walsh, multiple people
  - Bill Walsh (1931–2007), American football coach
- Bill Walton (1952–2024), American Hall-of-Fame National Basketball Association player and broadcaster
- Bill Ward (born 1948), English musician, drummer for Black Sabbath
- Bill Watterson (born 1958), American cartoonist, author of the comic strip Calvin and Hobbes
- Bill West (racing driver) (1927–2017), American racing driver
- Bill Weld (born 1945), American attorney, 68th governor of Massachusetts
- Bill White, multiple people
- Bill Wiggin, British Member of Parliament
- Bill Williams, multiple people
- Bill Williamson (1922–1979), Australian jockey
- Bill Williamson (footballer) (1887–1918), English footballer
- Bill Withers (1938–2020), American singer and songwriter
- Bill Wold, American basketball player
- Bill Wurtz (born 1989) American musician and video creator.
- Bill Wyman (born William George Perks Jr. in 1936), English musician, record producer, songwriter and singer, former bass guitarist for the Rolling Stones
- Bill Young (1930–2013), American politician
- Bill Zonnon (born 2006), Canadian ice hockey player

== Fictional characters ==
- Bill, a duck character in Sitting Ducks
- Bill, one of the protagonists in Left 4 Dead
- Bill Thompson, character in Postman Pat
- "Lightning" Bill Carson, a fictional character portrayed by actor Tim McCoy in a series of films, see Straight Shooter
- Bill Carson, a character in The Good, the Bad and the Ugly
- Bill the Cat, fictional cat appearing in the works of cartoonist Berkeley Breathed
- Bill Cipher, a character in Gravity Falls
- Bill Dauterive, a character from King of the Hill
- Bill Denbrough, a character in the novel and film It (2017 film)
- Bill Foster, a superhero appearing in American comic books published by Marvel Comics
- Bill Hawks, the British prime minister that appeared in Professor Layton and the Unwound Future
- Bill Henrickson, the lead character from the HBO series Big Love
- Bill Kemp, a character from the 1984 apocalyptic war drama television film Threads
- Bill, Ben's twin brother in The Railway Series and the spinoff TV series Thomas and Friends
- Bill, character in the Flower Pot Men
- Bill Newton, a character from the Hill Climb Racing franchise
- Bill Potts (Doctor Who), a character in Doctor Who
- Bill S. Preston, Esq, a character in Bill & Ted's Excellent Adventure, and its sequels
- Bill Rawls, a character from The Wire
- Bill Sikes, main antagonist from Oliver Twist
- Bill Spencer, fictional character from the soap opera The Bold and the Beautiful
- Bill Spencer Jr., fictional character from the soap opera The Bold and the Beautiful
- Bill Standall, a character in the Netflix series 13 Reasons Why
- Bill the Lizard, a character in Alice's Adventures in Wonderland
- Little Bill, an American animated educational television series created by Bill Cosby
- Mr. Bill, clay figurine star of a parody of children's movies shows created by Walter Williams
- Bootstrap Bill Turner, father of Will Turner in Disney's Pirates of the Caribbean films
- Bill Williamson, character in the video game Red Dead Redemption and its prequel Red Dead Redemption 2
- Bill Woodward, a character in Team StarKid's The Guy Who Didn't Like Musicals
- Mr. Bill Beasley, character in Bob the Builder

== See also ==
- Buffalo Bill (1846–1917), American Old West scout, bison hunter and showman whom the NFL's Buffalo Bills derived their name from
- "Wild Bill" Hickok (1837–1876), American Old West folk hero
- William T. Anderson (1840–1864), pro-Confederate guerrilla leader in the American Civil War known as "Bloody Bill"
- Major “Bloody Bill” Cunningham (1756–1787), American Revolutionary War loyalist
- William "Bible Bill" Aberhart (1878–1943), Canadian politician
- Big Bill (disambiguation)
- Little Bill (disambiguation)
- Billy (name)
