= Bill =

Bill, Bills, or The Bill may refer to:

- Banknote, paper cash (especially in the United States)
- Invoice, commercial document issued by a seller to a buyer
- Bill (law), a proposed law put before a legislature
  - Bill (United States Congress)
  - e.g. Bill of rights
- Beak, an external rostrum structure found mostly in birds
- A printed advertisement such as a handbill, a playbill (see programme (booklet)), or a poster distributed through bill posting

== People ==
- Bill (given name), a list of people and fictional characters
- Bill (surname)
- Bill (footballer, born 1953), Brazilian football forward Oswaldo Faria
- Bill (footballer, born 1978), Togolese football forward Alessandro Faria
- Bill (footballer, born 1984), Brazilian football forward Rosimar Amâncio
- Bill (footballer, born 1999), Brazilian forward Fabricio Rodrigues da Silva Ferreira

== Arts, media, and entertainment ==
=== Characters ===
- Bill, the villain of the Kill Bill films
- Bill, one of the protagonists of the Bill & Ted films
- A lizard in Lewis Carroll's Alice's Adventures in Wonderland
- A locomotive in The Railway Series and Thomas & Friends
- A candy store owner in the 1971 film, Willy Wonka & the Chocolate Factory
- Bill the Cat, a Bloom County character
- Bill Cipher, a demon in Gravity Falls
- Bill the Pony and his previous owner Bill Ferny in the novel The Lord of the Rings
- Bill Potts (Doctor Who), a female companion of the twelfth Doctor in Doctor Who
- Bill Sikes, the antagonist from Oliver Twist
- Mr. Bill, a claymation character on Saturday Night Live
- Sour Bill, in Wreck-It Ralph
- Bill Kerman, in the computer game Kerbal Space Program

=== Television and movies ===
- The Bill, 1984–2010 British police procedural TV drama series
- The Bill (Inside No. 9), a 2017 episode (S3 E2) of British television series Inside No. 9
- Bill (1981 film), a 1981 TV film starring Mickey Rooney
  - Bill: On His Own, 1983 sequel to the 1981 film
- Bill (2015 film), an adventure-comedy film about Shakespeare from the cast of Horrible Histories
- Bill, the Galactic Hero (film), 2014 science student fiction film based on the 1965 Harry Harrison novel
- Meet Bill, a 2007 comedy film formerly known as Bill

=== Music ===
==== Bands ====
- The Bill (band)

==== Albums ====
- Bill (Bill Cosby album), 1973
- Bill (Bill Anderson album), 1973
- Bill (Tripping Daisy album), 1992
- Bill, 2021 album by William Shatner

==== Songs ====
- "Bill" (song), a song from the 1927 musical Show Boat
- "Bill", a 1996 song by Peggy Scott-Adams

=== Literature ===
- Bill, the Galactic Hero, a 1965 science fiction novel by American writer Harry Harrison
- Bill, the Galactic Hero on the Planet of Bottled Brains, a 1990 novel by Harry Harrison and Robert Sheckley
- "Bill, the Ventriloquial Rooster", an 1898 sketch story by Australian writer Henry Lawson
- "The Bill" (short story), a 2013 short story by Hungarian writer László Krasznahorkai

== Military ==
- Bill (weapon), a weapon similar to a halberd
- BILL Anti-tank guided weapon, a Swedish anti-tank weapon
  - BILL 2 Anti-tank guided weapon, a Swedish anti-tank weapon
- Bill the Goat, the mascot of the US Naval Academy

== Other uses ==
- Bill, Wyoming, an unincorporated community, United States
- Tropical Storm Bill, a list of storms
- Bill.com or BILL Holdings, Inc., an American business finance software company
- Bills.com, an American personal finance website
- Bill's, a British restaurant and bar chain

== See also ==
- Bills (disambiguation)
- Bil (disambiguation)
- Little Bill (disambiguation)
- "Be like Bill", a mid-2010s social media meme
