= William =

Male given name

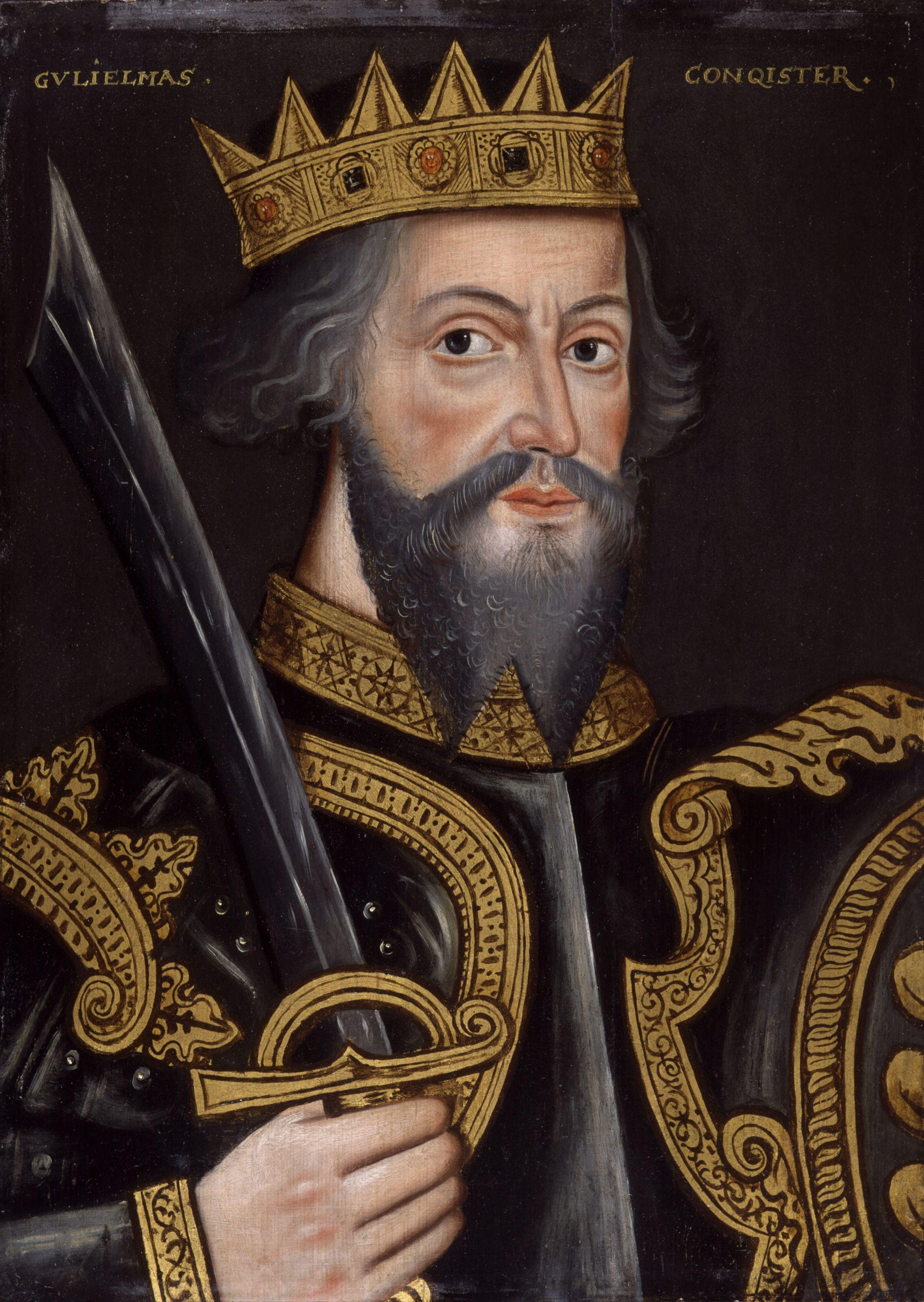
- William the Conqueror; The name William became popular in England after the Norman conquest in 1066 by William the Conqueror.
- Pronunciation: /wɪljəm/
- Gender: Male
- Language: Norman French, & Germanic languages
- Name day: October 28

Origin
- Meaning: "Vehement protector"
- Region of origin: Northern Europe

Other names
- Nicknames: Liam; Bill; Billy; Willie or Willy
- Related names: Wilhelm; Guillaume; Willian; Guillermo; Guglielmo; Guilherme; Gwilym
- Popularity: see popular names

William is a masculine given name of Germanic origin. It became popular in England after the Norman conquest in 1066, and remained so throughout the Middle Ages and into the modern era. It is sometimes abbreviated "Wm." Shortened familiar versions in English include Will or Wil, Wills, Willy or Willie, Bill, Billie and Billy.

A common Irish and English form is Liam. Scottish diminutives include Wull, Willie or Wullie (as in Oor Wullie). Female forms include Willa, Willemina, Wilma and Wilhelmina.

== Etymology ==
William is related to the German given name Wilhelm. Both ultimately descend from Proto-Germanic *Wiljahelmaz, with a direct cognate also in the Old Norse name Vilhjalmr and a West Germanic borrowing into Medieval Latin Willelmus. The Proto-Germanic name is a compound of *wiljô "will, wish, desire" and *helmaz "helm, helmet".

By regular sound change, Proto-Germanic *Wiljahelmaz should have also descended into English as *Wilhelm, but this latter form is unattested in written English of any period; the Anglo-Saxon Chronicle refers to William the Conqueror as Willelm, a back-formation from the Medieval Latin variant. The form William is a back-borrowing from Old Norman Williame, a specifically northern Norman reflex of Medieval Latin Willelmus (compare the Central French cognate Guillaume). The development of the name's northern Norman form can be traced in the different versions of the name appearing in Wace's Roman de Rou.

The first well-known bearer of the name was Charlemagne's cousin William of Gellone (755–812). This William is immortalized in the Chanson de Guillaume, and the esteem in which he was held may account for the name's subsequent popularity among European nobility.

== English history ==
The English "William" is taken from the Anglo-Norman language and was transmitted to England after the Norman conquest in the 11th century, and soon became the most popular name in England, along with other Norman names such as Robert (the English cognate was Hrēodbeorht, which by regular sound changes would have developed into something along the lines of "Reedbart"), Richard, Roger (the English cognate was Hroðgar), and Henry (all of Germanic origin and may have been transmitted through the Normans' use of Old French).

The name Wilkin/Wilkins is also of medieval origin, taken from the shortened version of William (Will) with the suffix "kin" added.

== Variants and translations ==
- Weelum (Scots)
- Willum (Scots)
- Wilhelm (German, Polish, Swedish)
- Willem, Wilhelmus, Wim (Dutch, Frisian, Low German)
- Willem, Wilhelm (Afrikaans)
- Willelm (Old English)
- Wëllem (Luxembourgish)
- Cuglierme, Gugliemo (Neapolitan)
- Gilen, Guilen (Basque)
- Gulielmus, Vilhelmus, Willelmus, Gullelmus, Gullielmus, Villelmus (Latin)
- Guglielmo (Italian)
- Guillaume (French)
- Guildhelm (Old Dutch)
- Guilhèm, Guilhem, Guilherme, Guilhèume, Guilhaume, Glhaume (Occitan)
- Guillem, Guim (Catalan)
- Guillén (Aragonese)
- Guillermo (Spanish)
- Guilherme (Portuguese)
- Guillerme (Galician)
- Gwilym (Welsh)
- Gwilherm (Breton)
- Gugghiermu (Sicilian)
- Gllâome (Modern Norman)
- Uilliam (Irish)
- Liam (Irish)
- Illiam (Manx Gaelic)
- Uilleam (Scottish Gaelic)
- Уилям – Uiliam (Bulgarian)
- Вильгельм, Гильом, Уильям – Vil'gel'm, Gil'yom, Uilyam (Russian)
- Вільгельм, Вільям – Vil'hel'm, Vil'yam (Ukrainian)
- Уільям, Вільям – Uiĺjam, Viĺjam (Belarusian)
- Vilhelm (Danish, Norwegian, Romanian, Swedish)
- Vilhelmo (Esperanto)
- Vilhelms (Latvian)
- Viliam (Slovak)
- Viljem (Slovene)
- Vilim (Croatian)
- Вилијам – Vilijam (Serbian)
- Vilém (Czech)
- Vilmos (Hungarian)
- Viljams, Vilhelms, Vilis (Latvian)
- Vilius, Viliumas, Vilhelmas (Lithuanian)
- Viljami, Ville, Vilho, Viljo (Finnish)
- Vilhjálmur (Icelandic)
- Vilhjálmur, Viljormur (Faroese)
- Vilhjalmr (Old Norse)
- Γουλιέλμος (Gouliélmos) (Greek)
- Գուլիելմոս (Goulielmós) (Armenian)

== See also ==
- Williams (surname)
- Bill (disambiguation)
- Billy (disambiguation)
- King William (disambiguation)
- Prince William (disambiguation)
- Saint William (disambiguation)
- Wilhelm (disambiguation)
