= Big Willy =

Big Willy or Big Willie may refer to:

- Big Willie (tank), a prototype of the first British tank
- Big Willie Style, the debut studio album by Will Smith
- Destroy All Humans! Big Willy Unleashed, a game for the Wii

== See also ==
- Big Bill (disambiguation)
