= California Hall of Fame =

American honorary organization

Coordinates: 38.57456°N 121.49528°W

- Type: Hall of fame
- Sponsored by: The California Museum
- Eligibility: Associated with California
- Motto: Spirit of California
- Status: Active
- Established: 2006
- Website: Official website
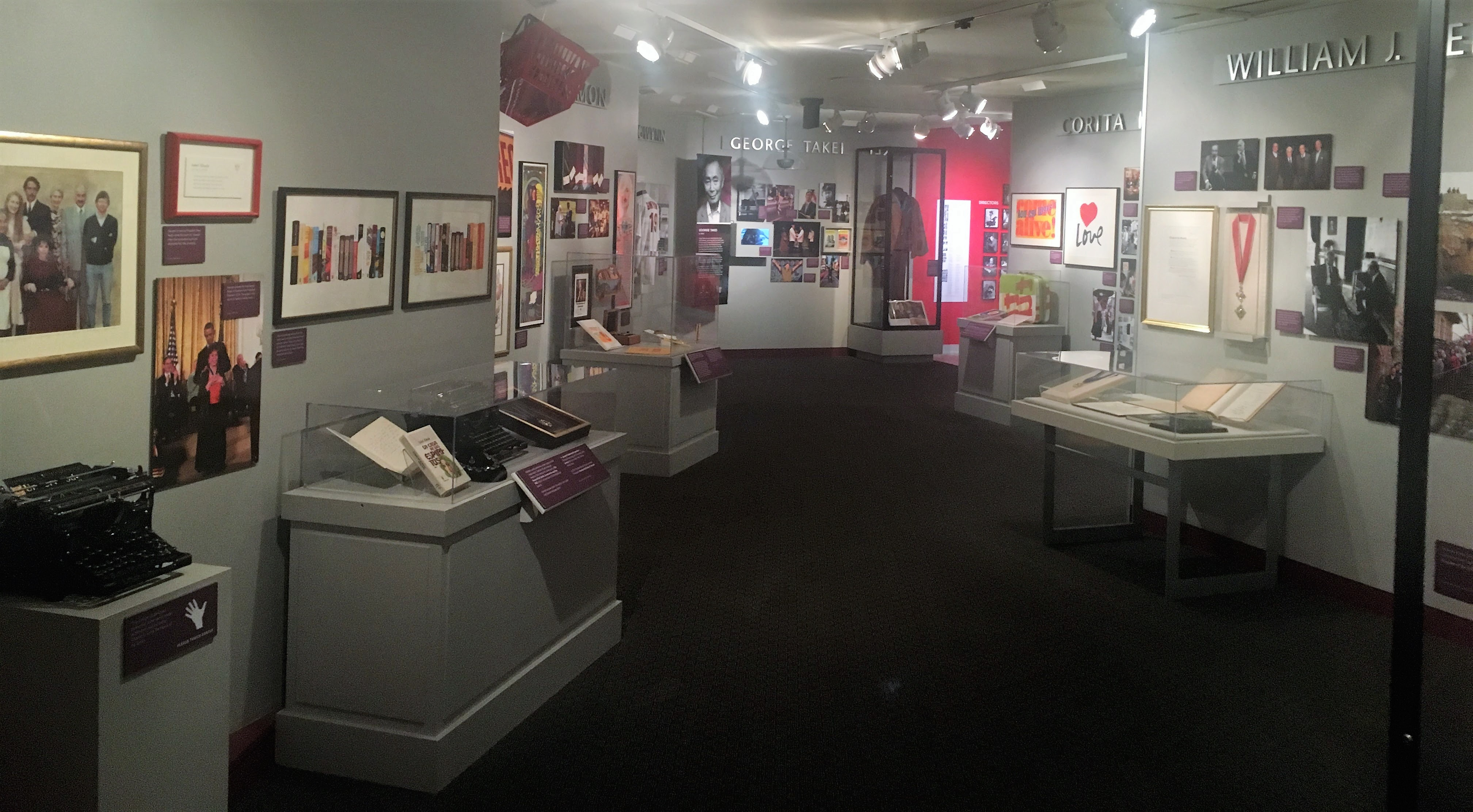
- Museum display

The California Hall of Fame is an institution created in 2006 by Maria Shriver to honor important Californians. The award was designed by Californian artists Robert Graham. The hall is located in The California Museum in Sacramento.

== Inductees ==
=== Class of 2006 ===
- César Chávez (To be removed 2026)
- Walt Disney
- Amelia Earhart
- Clint Eastwood
- Frank Gehry
- Hearst family
- David D. Ho, M.D.
- Billie Jean King
- John Muir
- David and Lucile Packard
- Ronald Reagan
- Sally K. Ride
- Alice Walker

=== Class of 2007 ===
- Ansel Adams
- Milton Berle
- Steve Jobs
- Willie Mays
- Robert Mondavi
- Rita Moreno
- Jackie Robinson
- Jonas Salk, M.D.
- John Steinbeck
- Elizabeth Taylor
- Earl Warren
- John Wayne
- Tiger Woods

=== Class of 2008 ===
- Dave Brubeck
- Jane Fonda
- Theodor Geisel (Dr. Seuss)
- Robert Graham
- Quincy Jones
- Jack LaLanne
- Dorothea Lange
- Julia Morgan
- Jack Nicholson
- Linus Pauling
- Leland Stanford
- Alice Waters

=== Class of 2009 ===
- Carol Burnett
- Andrew Grove
- Hiram Johnson
- Rafer Johnson
- Henry J. Kaiser
- Joan Kroc
- George Lucas
- John Madden
- Harvey Milk
- Fritz Scholder
- Danielle Steel
- Joe Weider
- Chuck Yeager

=== Class of 2010 ===
- Pat Brown
- James Cameron
- John Doerr
- A.P. Giannini
- Merle Haggard
- Anne Lamott
- George Shultz
- Kevin Starr
- Levi Strauss
- Barbra Streisand
- Wayne Thiebaud
- Betty White
- Serena Williams
- Mark Zuckerberg

=== Class of 2011 ===
- Buzz Aldrin
- The Beach Boys
- Elizabeth Blackburn
- Father Gregory Boyle
- Doris and Donald Fisher
- Magic Johnson
- Ed Roberts
- Carlos Santana
- Amy Tan
- Roger Traynor

=== Class of 2012 ===
- Gregory Bateson
- Warren Beatty
- Charles and Ray Eames
- Dolores Huerta
- Ishi
- Joe Montana
- The Warner Brothers: Harry, Albert, Sam, and Jack L. Warner

=== Class of 2014 ===
- Kareem Abdul-Jabbar
- Charlotta Bass
- Francis Ford Coppola
- Joan Didion
- Fred Ross
- Stephen Schneider
- Mimi Silbert
- Dr. Dre and Jimmy Iovine

=== Class of 2015 ===
- Kristi Yamaguchi
- Robert Downey Jr.
- Bruce Lee
- David Hockney
- Buck Owens
- Lester Holt
- Ellen Ochoa
- Charles Schulz

=== Class of 2016 ===
- Isabel Allende
- Harrison Ford
- Tony Gwynn
- Corita Kent
- William J. Perry
- Maria Shriver
- Russ Solomon
- George Takei

=== Class of 2017 ===
- Lucille Ball
- Susan Desmond-Hellmann
- Mabel McKay
- Mario J. Molina
- Jim Plunkett
- Gary Snyder
- Steven Spielberg
- Michael Tilson Thomas
- Warren Winiarski

=== Class of 2018 ===
- Joan Baez
- Arlene Blum
- Belva Davis
- Thomas Keller
- Ed Lee
- Nancy McFadden
- Robert Redford
- Fernando Valenzuela

=== Class of 2019 ===
- Maya Angelou
- France A. Cordova
- RuPaul Andre Charles
- Helen M. Turley
- Brandi Chastain
- Wolfgang Puck
- Jeanne Wakatsuki Houston
- James M. Lawson Jr.
- George Lopez
- Tony Hawk
- Tyrus Wong

=== Class of 2021 ===
- Ruth Asawa
- Jerry Garcia
- Larry Itliong
- Del Martin and Phyllis Lyon
- Anna May Wong
- Ritchie Valens

=== Class of 2022 ===
- Lynda Carter
- Roy Choi
- Steven Chu
- Peggy Fleming
- Arlie Russell Hochschild
- Alonzo King
- Barbara Morgan
- Megan Rapinoe
- Linda Ronstadt
- Los Tigres del Norte
- Ed Ruscha

=== Class of 2023 ===
- Carrie Fisher
- Maggie Gee
- Etta James
- Bobby Kimball
- Minoru Namba Otsuji
- Jose Julio Sarria
- Vin Scully
- Shirley Temple Black
- Archie Williams

=== Class of 2024 ===
- Helene An
- Willie Brown
- Vinton G. Cerf
- Ava DuVernay
- The Go-Go's
- Thelton Henderson
- Los Lobos
- Cheryl Miller
- Leon Panetta
- Brenda Way

=== Class of 2025 ===
- Julia Child
- Ina Donna Coolbrith
- Vicki Manalo Draves
- Mitsuye Endo
- Dian Fossey
- Alice Piper
- Tina Turner
- Kamala Harris
- Doug Emhoff

=== Class of 2026 ===
- John L. Burton
- Jamie Lee Curtis
- Riane Eisler
- Janet Evans
- Carl Lewis
- Mariachi Reyna de Los Ángeles
- Nobu Matsuhisa
- Terry McMillan
- Arnold Schwarzenegger
