= Big Bill (disambiguation) =

Big Bill is a nickname.

Big Bill may also refer to:

- "Big Bill", a song by Johnny Greenwood from the 1975 album The Singing Transport Man
- Big Bill, the nickname of the South African Class 15C 4-8-2 locomotives
- Big Bill (pig), a world-record pig
- Big Bill Creek, in Montana, U.S.
- Big Bill Mountain, in Montana, U.S.

== See also ==
- Little Bill (disambiguation)
- Muddy Waters Sings "Big Bill", a 1960 album
