= Round Table Pizza =

American pizza parlor chain

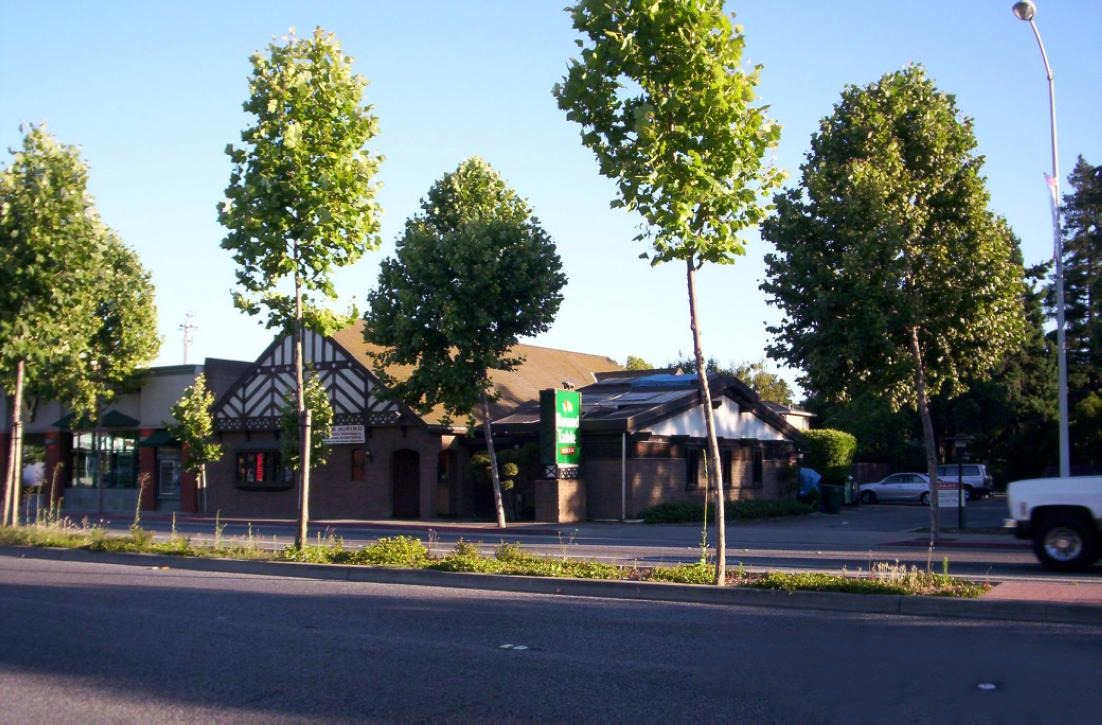
- Round Table #1 in Menlo Park, relocated to 1225 El Camino Real from its original location at 1235 El Camino Real.
- Type: Subsidiary
- Founded: 1959; 67 years ago Menlo Park, California, United States
- Founder: William R. Larson
- Headquarters: Atlanta, Georgia, U.S.
- Number of locations: 400+
- Key people: Paul Damico (CEO)
- Products: Pizza, chicken wings, salads
- Parent: FBG Bid Co.
- Website: www.roundtablepizza.com

Round Table Pizza is a chain and franchise of pizza parlors in the Western United States. The first Round Table Pizza restaurant was opened in 1959, and the company has over 400 restaurants. The company is headquartered in Atlanta, Georgia.

== Overview ==
The company currently operates two formats. Traditional Round Table Pizza restaurants serve primarily pizza, salads, and beverages. A new format, Round Table Pizza Clubhouse - Pizza Pub Play, features expanded entertainment with arcade games for children and big-screen TVs with sports programming, as well as an expanded menu and craft beer selection.

== History ==
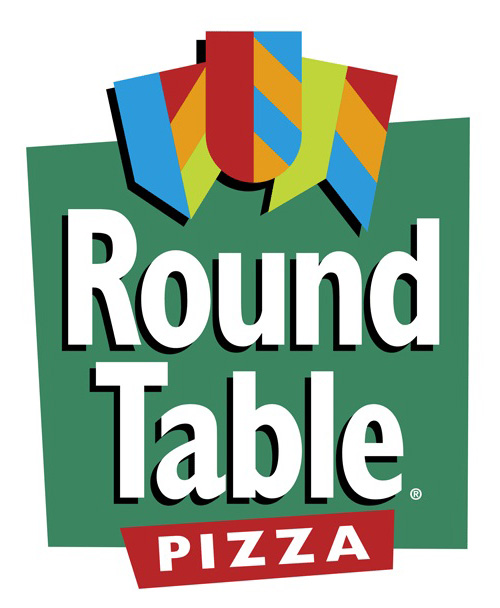
Old version of the Round Table Pizza logo designed by William R. Larson.

Round Table Pizza was founded by William R. Larson. Larson was born in San Jose, California, on January 30, 1933, and was raised in Palo Alto, California. After serving 4 years in the U.S. Navy, Larson worked several different jobs, gaining experience that ultimately led him to create his own restaurant. He opened his first pizza parlor in Menlo Park, California on December 21, 1959 located at 1235 El Camino Real. He called his new restaurant Round Table Pizza. He named the restaurant Round Table Pizza after the round redwood tables he and his father constructed.

This original location in Menlo Park would eventually be moved to 1225 El Camino Real a few years later, where it still stands today and is owned and operated by Bob Larson, William's son. As of 2020, Bob Larson still owns and operates the original Menlo Park location.

According to PizzaMarketPlace.com, "William's developed recipe & crust soon brought Round Table Pizza a strong following from customers and entrepreneurs." By 1978 under Larson's direction, Round Table had amassed over 225 stores. In 2011, the company filed for protection under Chapter 11 with the U.S. bankruptcy court and emerged from bankruptcy the same year. The Consensual Plan of Reorganization provides for 100% repayment of obligations to its secured and unsecured creditors and for its employee owners to retain 100% ownership of the company. Since then, the company met all obligations and its financial strength steadily improved with the retirement of debt and the increase in cash flow.

In 2014, the company signed a 35-store development agreement to build restaurants in Bahrain, Saudi Arabia, Oman, Kuwait, and Qatar. As of 2016, more than 450 franchised and company-owned locations were in Alaska, Arizona, California, Hawaii, Nevada, Oregon, and Washington. On September 15, 2017, Round Table Pizza announced that it was acquired by Global Franchise Group. In the same month, September 2017, Round Table Pizza closed all of the seven branches in Dubai.

In 2019, Round Table Pizza rebranded on its 60th anniversary, including a new logo and a new motto: "Pizza Royalty". The chain also expanded to the Dallas-Fort Worth metroplex for the first time in 2019, with new locations in Frisco and near the Southern Methodist University campus in University Park.

On June 28, 2021, Global Franchise Group announced that it would be acquired by FAT Brands, owners of Fatburger and Johnny Rockets. The acquisition was completed on July 22.

On January 26, 2026, parent company FAT Brands filed for Chapter 11 bankruptcy protection in an effort to shed billions of dollars in debt. The company listed assets and liabilities between $1 billion and $10 billion. After receiving court approval for the sale of its assets, FBG Bid Co. officially acquired the remaining assets from FAT Brands for $595 million on June 18, 2026, including Round Table Pizza.

== Marketing ==
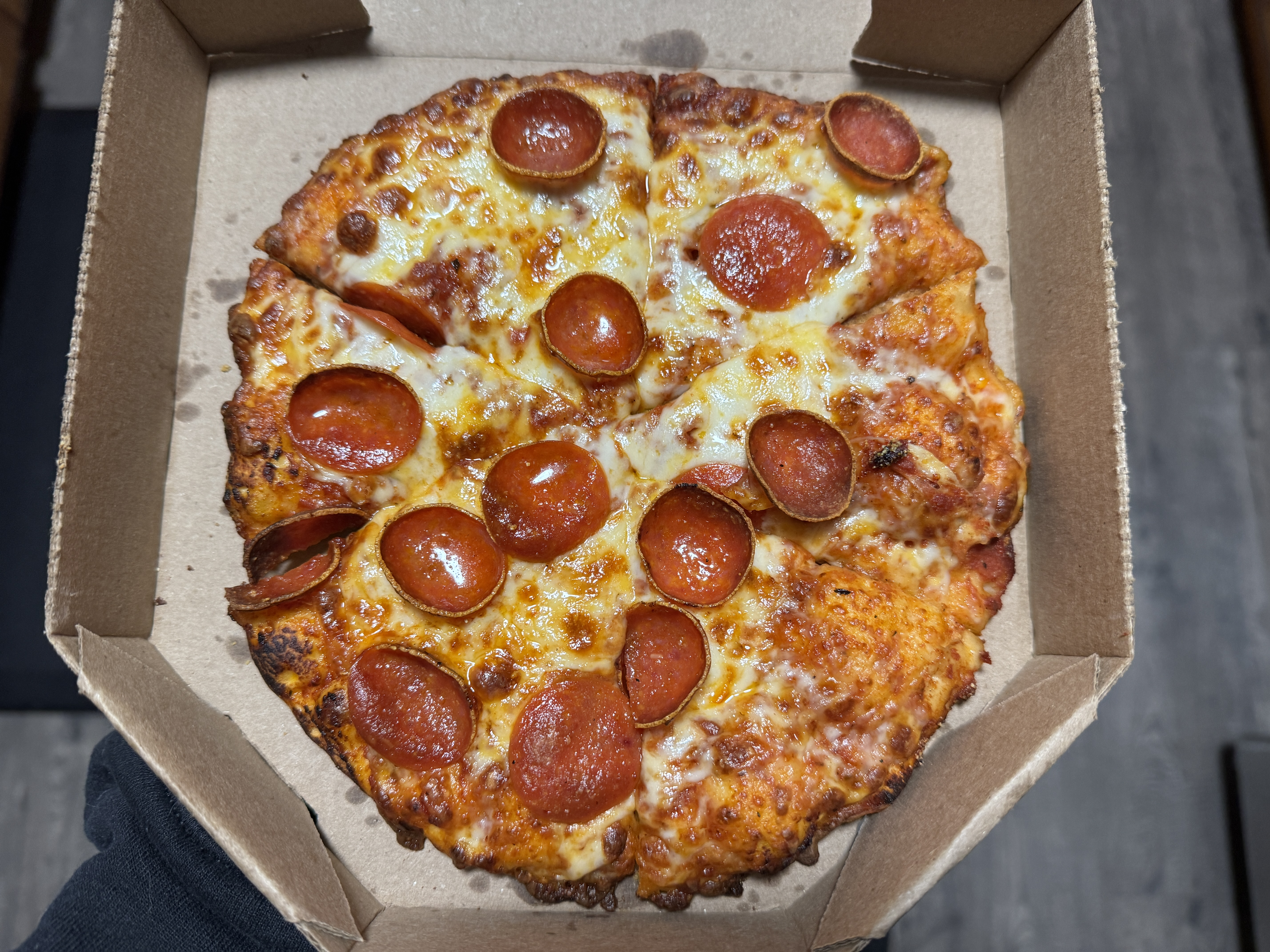
A personal sized pepperoni pizza from Round Table Pizza.

William Larson penned the slogan for Round Table "share a little pizza with someone you love." This was later changed to "The Last Honest Pizza." In 1961, a friend of Larson's drew some sketches of members of King Arthur's court eating pizza, and Larson then adopted the King Arthur theme for his restaurants. The three banners in the official logo were added in 1970, and are intended to symbolize the letters "F-U-N". Round Table Pizza began to expand through franchising.

Larson sold a portion of Round Table stock to a group of investors in 1979. The investors formed an employee stock ownership plan in 1985, and by 1992, Round Table Pizza was wholly employee owned. Larson sold about 75% of the private franchise corporation to partners in 1978. In 1995 the controlling partners bought out Larson's remaining 25%.

From around 2003 until 2005, Round Table Pizza's official mascots were two puppets, Matt and Marcus, that appeared in the company's television commercials. In 2007, Round Table Pizza's mascot became the Pizza Knight, "defender of family night." Since that time, other spokespersons have been featured, including actor Billy Gardell.

== See also ==
- List of pizza chains of the United States
