= Bill Maher (disambiguation) =

Bill Maher (born 1956) is an American stand-up comedian, television host, political commentator, satirist and author.

Bill or William Maher may also refer to:

- Bill Maher (rower) (born 1946), American rower
- Bill Maher (athletic director), American director of athletics for Canisius College
- Bill Maher (hurler) (born 1994), Irish hurler and Gaelic footballer
- Bill Maher (politician) (born c. 1948), member of the San Francisco Board of Education and the San Francisco Board of Supervisors and brother of John Maher
- Billy Maher English radio presenter
- William Maher (hurler) (born 1979), Irish retired hurler, manager and selector
- William H. Maher (1846–1913), American businessman and author
- Will Maher (born 1995), British rugby league footballer
