= Bill (surname) =

Bill is a surname, and may refer to:

- Alfred H. Bill (1879–1964), American writer
- Charles Bill (1843–1915), British politician
- Edward Lyman Bill (1862–1916), founder and editor of the magazine, Talking Machine World
- Ian Bill (born 1944), Scottish footballer
- Ledyard Bill (1836–1907), American politician, publisher, and writer
- Max Bill (1908–1994), Swiss architect, artist and designer
- Per Bill (1958–) Swedish politician
- William Bill (c. 1505–1561), English churchman and academic

== See also ==
- Bills (disambiguation), which includes several people with the surname
