= John Maher (Delancey Street) =

American activist

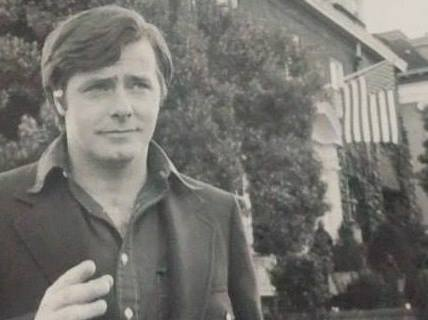
John Maher, founder of the Delancey Street Foundation. Pacific Heights, San Francisco~1973

John Maher (1940 – December 3, 1988) was an American former child alcoholic and heroin addict, who founded the Delancey Street Foundation, a nonprofit organization, in 1971. The organization, based in San Francisco, provides residential rehabilitation services and vocational training for substance abusers and convicted criminals.

As co-president of the organization from 1972 to 1984, Maher rose to national prominence as the subject of two books (John Maher of Delancey Street by Grover Sales and Sane Asylum; Inside the Delancey Street Foundation by Charles Hampden-Turner), a TV movie (1975's Delancey Street: The Crisis Within), and news media coverage (including a 1974 60 Minutes segment, "Love Thy Neighbor"). He was also active in San Francisco politics, helping to elect his younger brother, Bill Maher, to the San Francisco Board of Education, and later the San Francisco Board of Supervisors.

In 1988, Maher died at the home of his mother, Marie Maher, in his native New York City after suffering from pneumonia. Mass was said at St. Gregory the Great Church.

== Personal life ==
Maher was originally from the Bronx, New York, and he dropped out of school in the eighth grade.

He was a partner of Mimi Silbert for many years.

== Media ==
- John Maher of Delancey Street by Grover Sales
- Sane Asylum; Inside the Delancey Street Foundation by Charles Hampden-Turner
- 60 Minutes, "Love Thy Neighbor" segment (1974)
- Delancey Street: The Crisis Within (1975) TV movie
