= William Larsen =

William, Bill or Willy Larsen may refer to:

- William Washington Larsen (1871–1938), American legislator from Georgia
- Willy Larsen (1885–1935), Finnish-American accordionist and recording artist
- William Larsen (1927–1996), American actor in Heaven Can Wait (1978 film)
- William Walter Larsen Jr., see Bill Larsen (1928–1993), American magician and president of the Academy of Magical Arts
- William Wiik Larsen (born 1986), Norwegian record producer and songwriter

== See also ==
- William Larson (disambiguation)
