= William Larson (disambiguation) =

William Larson (1942–2019) was an American conceptual photographer.

Bill or William Larson may also refer to:

- Bill Larson (fullback) (1938–2015), American football fullback
- Bill Larson (tight end) (born 1953), American football tight end
- William Larson (businessman) (1933–2006), American businessman, founder of Round Table Pizza

== See also ==
- Bill Larsen (1928–1993), American magician
- William Larsson (1873–1926), Swedish silent film actor
- William Larsen (disambiguation)
