= William Barrett =

William Barrett may refer to:

- William Barrett II (1754-1840), North Carolina Revolutionary War Captain, sheriff, and politician
- W. S. Barrett (1914–2001), English classical scholar
- William Barrett (antiquarian) (1733–1789), English antiquary and surgeon
- William Barrett (consul) (died 1584), English consul
- William Barrett (philosopher) (1913–1992), American philosopher and professor
- William Barrett (priest) (1880–1956), British–Australian Anglican Dean of Brisbane
- William A. Barrett (1896–1976), American lawyer and politician
- William Edmund Barrett (1900–1986), American writer
- William Emerson Barrett (1858–1906), American journalist and politician
- William F. Barrett (1844–1925), English physicist
- William H. Barrett (1866–1941), American federal judge
- William Lewis Barrett (1847–1927), English flautist and music teacher
- William N. Barrett (1855–1916), American politician

== See also ==
- Bill Barrett (disambiguation)
- William Barratt (1823–1889), English convert to Mormonism
- William Barratt (manufacturer) (1877–1939), British shoe manufacturer
- William Cross Barratt (1862–1940), British Army and British Indian Army officer
- William Barret (fl. 1579–1595), English divine
- William Barret (died 1871), American businessman
- William E. Berrett (1902–1993), writer and educator
