= Big Bill =

Big Bill is a nickname that may refer to:

- Bill Abstein (1883–1940), American Major League Baseball and amateur soccer player
- Bill Bachrach (1879–1959), American swim and water polo coach
- Bill Bagwell (1895–1976), American Major League Baseball player
- Big Bill Bissonnette (1937–2018), American jazz trombonist and producer
- Big Bill Broonzy (1903–1958), American blues singer and guitarist
- William Stephen Devery (1854–1919), New York City Police superintendent and first police chief, later co-owner of the New York Yankees baseball team
- Bill Dwyer (mobster) (1883–1946), prohibition gangster and bootlegger
- Big Bill Edwards (1877–1943), American college football player
- Bill France Sr. (1909–1992), American racing driver, co-founder, Chairman and CEO of NASCAR
- Bill Gatewood (1881–1962), American Negro league baseball player and manager
- Bill Haywood (1869–1928), a prominent figure of the American labor movement
- William H. Hodgins (1856–1912), New York City police captain
- Bill Hollenback (1886–1968), American college football Hall-of-Fame player and coach
- Bill James (pitcher, born 1887) (1887–1942), Major League Baseball pitcher
- Bill Kemmer (1873–1945), American Major League Baseball player
- Bill Lee (right-handed pitcher) (1909–1977), Major League Baseball pitcher
- William McKinley (1843-1901), 25th President of the United States
- Big Bill Morganfield (born 1956), American blues singer and guitarist
- Big Bill (wrestler) (born 1986), American professional wrestler
- Big Bill Neidjie (c. 1920–2002), last surviving speaker of the Gagudju language
- Big Bill Smith (1869–?), American Negro league baseball player and manager
- Bill Speakman (1927–2018), British Army soldier awarded the Victoria Cross
- William Howard Taft (1857–1930), 27th president of the United States
- William Hale Thompson (1869–1944), mayor of Chicago
- Bill Tilden (1893–1953), American tennis player
- Bill Verna (born 1929), Australian professional wrestler
- Bill Voiselle (1919–2005), Major League Baseball pitcher
- William Watson (decathlete) (1916–1973), first African-American to win the national decathlon championship
- Bill Werbeniuk (1947–2003), Canadian snooker player

== See also ==
- Little Bill (disambiguation)
