= Pionki =

Town in Masovian Voivodeship, Poland

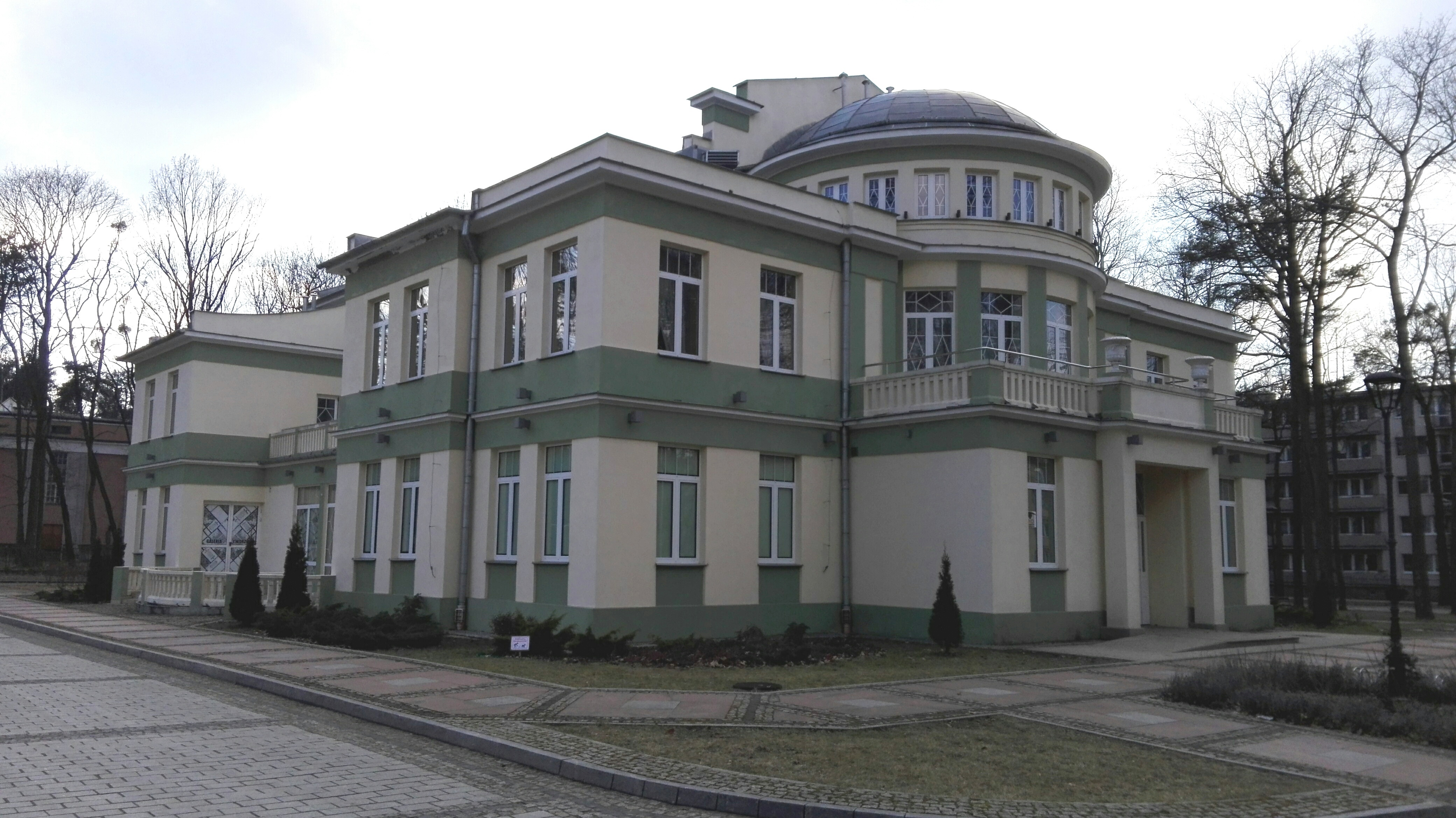
- Local Activity Center in Pionki

- Flag Coat of arms

- Location within Poland
- Coordinates: 51°29′N 21°27′E
- Country: Poland
- Voivodeship: Masovian
- County: Radom
- Gmina: Pionki (urban gmina)
- First mentioned: 1391
- Town rights: 1954

Government
  - Mayor: Łukasz Miśkiewicz

Area
  - Total: 18.34 km^{2} (7.08 sq mi)

Population (2016)
  - Total: 18,846
  - Density: 1,028/km^{2} (2,661/sq mi)
- Time zone: UTC+1 (CET)
  - Summer (DST): UTC+2 (CEST)
- Postal code: 26-670 to 26-675
- Area code: +48 048
- Car plates: WRA
- Website: http://www.pionki.pl

Pionki [ˈpʲɔŋkʲi] is a town in Radom County, Masovian Voivodeship, central Poland with 18,846 inhabitants (2016). Surrounded by the Kozienice Wilderness, Pionki is located in northern part of historic province of Lesser Poland, 20 kilometres (12 miles) from Radom, and 105 kilometres (65 miles) from Warsaw.

== History ==
The mills of Pionki and Zagożdżon were first mentioned in medieval documents in 1391. Both settlements were royal villages, administratively located in the Radom County in the Sandomierz Voivodeship in the Lesser Poland Province of the Kingdom of Poland.

Until 1932, the settlement was a village named Zagożdżon. Its development was closely associated with Chemical Plant Pronit (Zakłady Tworzyw Sztucznych ZTS Pronit), founded in 1923 as State Manufacturer of Gunpowder and Explosives (Państwowa Wytwórnia Prochu i Materiałów Kruszących PWPiMK). Originally, it was an arms factory, which manufactured explosives, and its location was deliberate - next to the village of Zagożdżon, among the forests and swamps of the Kozienice Wilderness, away from main population centers, and along the strategic rail line Radom-Dęblin. After World War II, the Chemical Plant Pronit began manufacturing glue, plastic, as well as gramophone records.

In the interbellum period, Pionki prospered due to government contracts, as demand for explosives of its chemical plant was high. In 1925, a new rail station was opened, three years later - a post office. In 1929, overhead power line joined Pionki with Skarżysko-Kamienna, and a vocational high school was opened. Later on, a new police station was opened, and in 1937, the construction of a hospital was initiated.

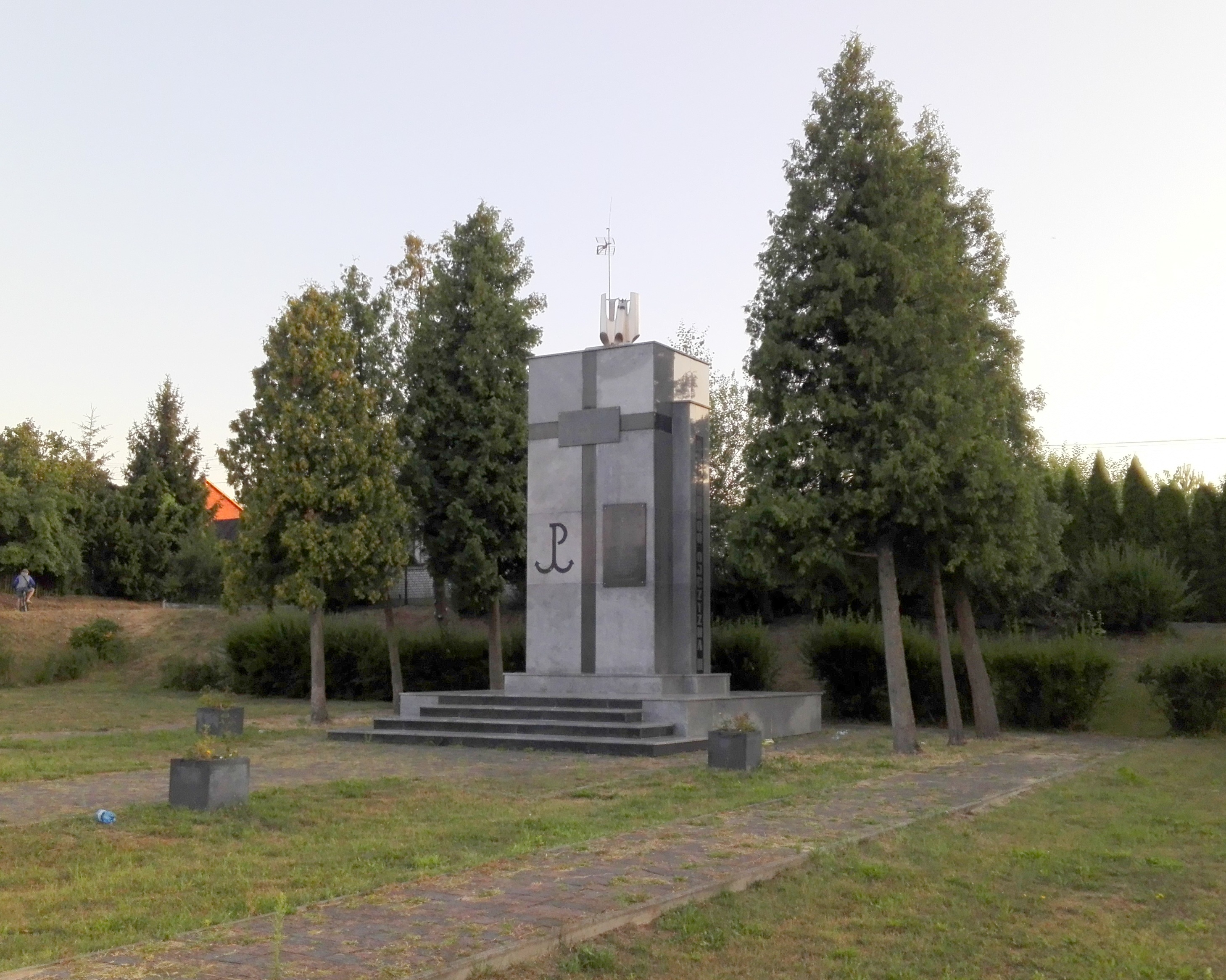
Memorial to local Polish resistance members executed by the Germans in 1944

During the joint German-Soviet invasion of Poland, which started World War II, in 1939, Pionki was bombed by the Luftwaffe and afterwards the Germans occupied the town. In addition to the other destruction, the Germans brutalized the Poles and the small Jewish population of around 200. As part of the AB-Aktion, in June 1940, the Germans carried out mass arrests of Poles, who were afterwards imprisoned and tortured in Skarżysko-Kamienna and then murdered in a forest near Skarżysko-Kamienna. Many Jews were conscripted for slave labor including the most dangerous jobs at a local gunpowder faculty. In late 1941, a ghetto was established and Jews from surrounding towns brought there, resulting in a population of around 700 and such severe overcrowding that some people lived in the street. Some local Poles were helpful in providing food for the impoverished residents. In August 1942, some of the healthier workers were sent to live at a work camp while the rest were sent to the Zwoleń ghetto and then, in late September, to the Treblinka extermination camp. They were immediately murdered there by gassing. The number of Pionki Jewish survivors was small, but at least eight.

Polish workers carried out acts of sabotage in the factories, and those at risk of arrest fled and joined partisan units in the nearby forests. On 4 April 1944, the town was briefly liberated by the Home Army and Peasant Battalions. In April 1944, the Germans executed 10 Polish resistance members in Pionki.

In 1919–1939, and after the war, until 1975, Pionki belonged to the Kielce Voivodeship. In 1975–1998, it administratively belonged to the Radom Voivodeship. In 1957–1991, the largest vinyl record pressing plant in Poland was located in Pionki.

== Sports ==
The town is home to a sports club Proch Pionki, established in 1926.

== Notable people ==
Punk rock band The Bill comes from Pionki. Polish musician Andrzej Piaseczny was born there.

== Twin towns ==
Pionki are twinned with:

- (Romania) Breaza
- (Ukraine) Vyshneve

== Gallery ==
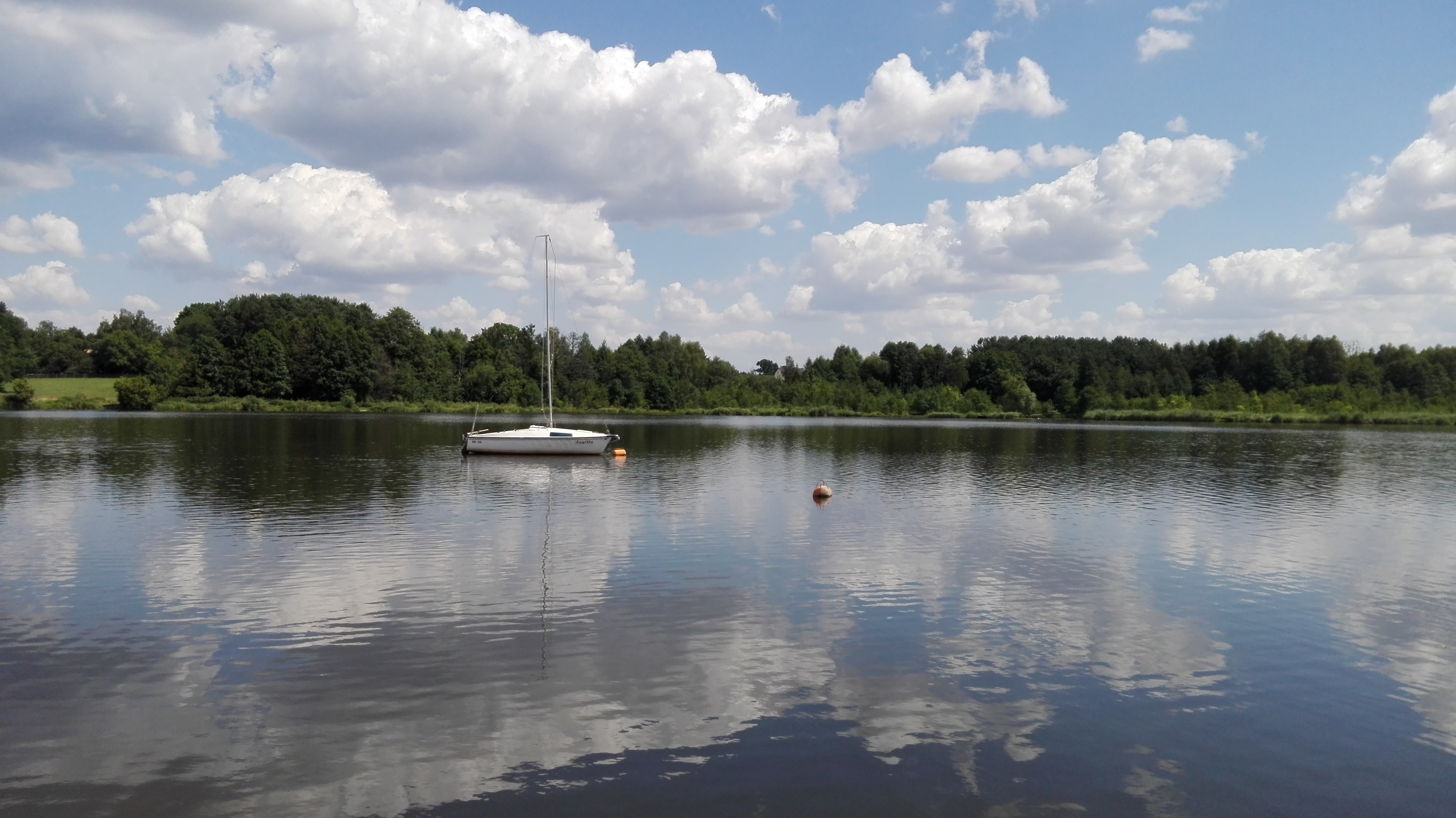
Upper Pond (Staw Górny)

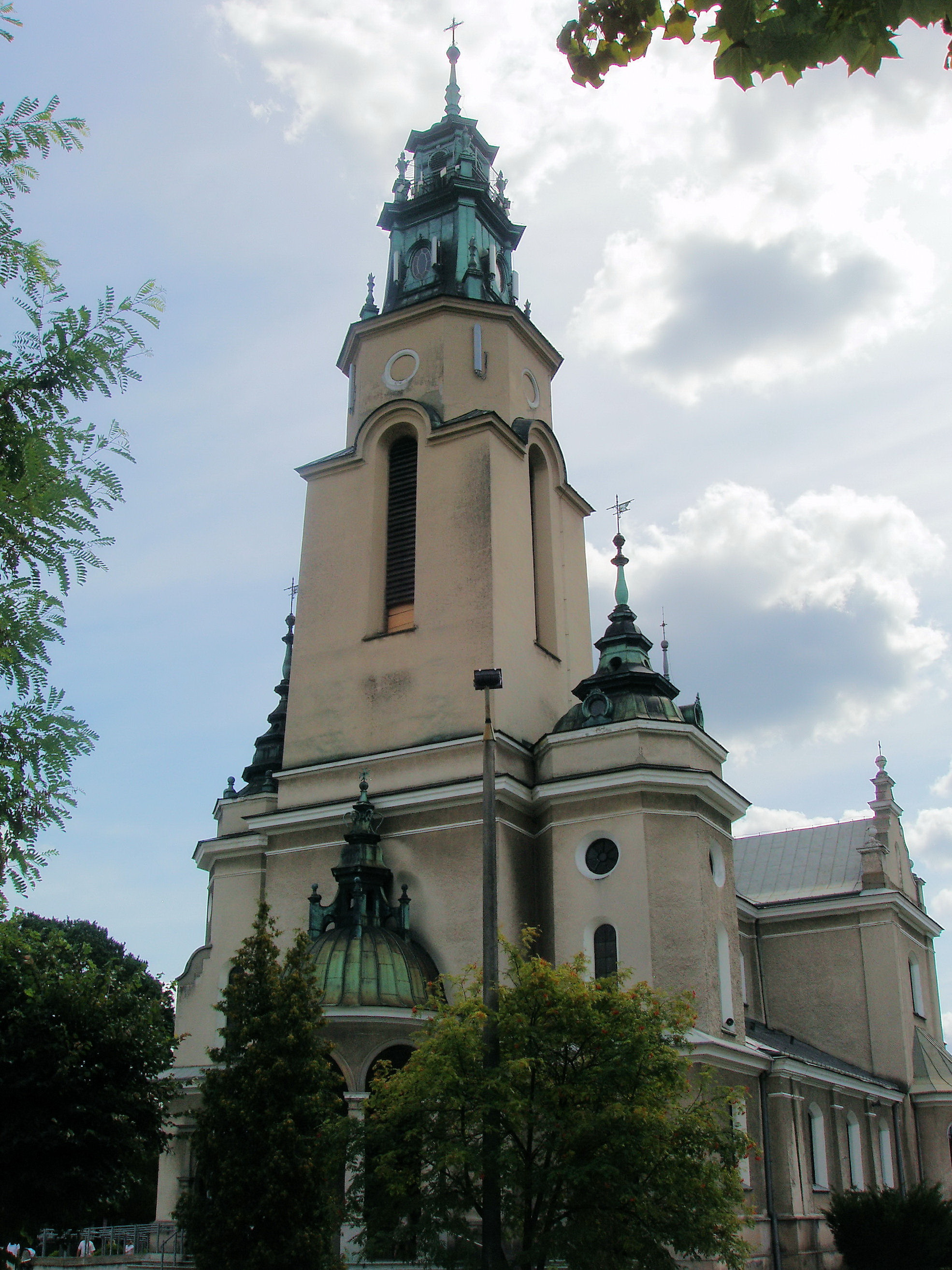
Saint Barbara church

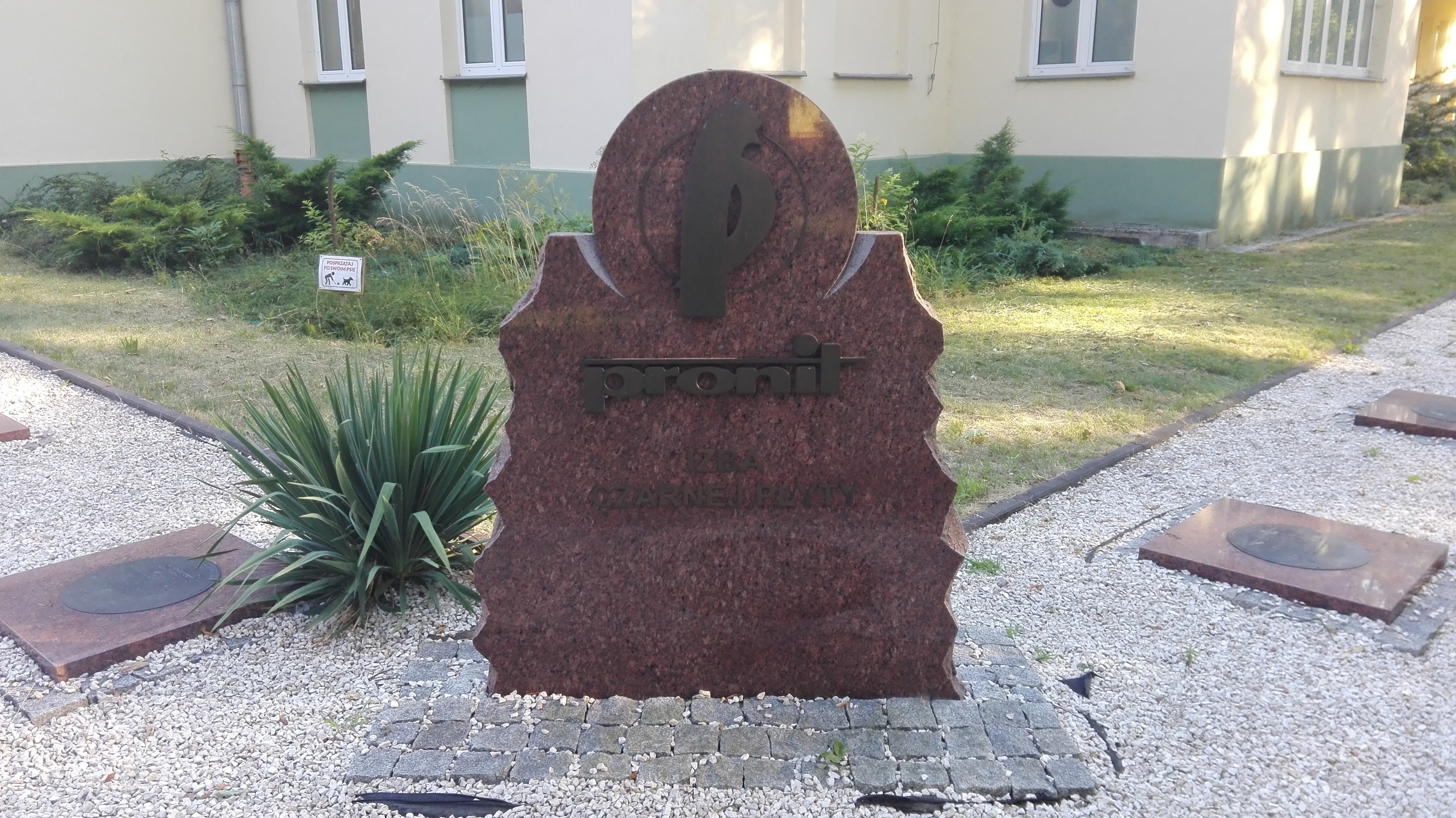
Memorial to the former vinyl record pressing plant

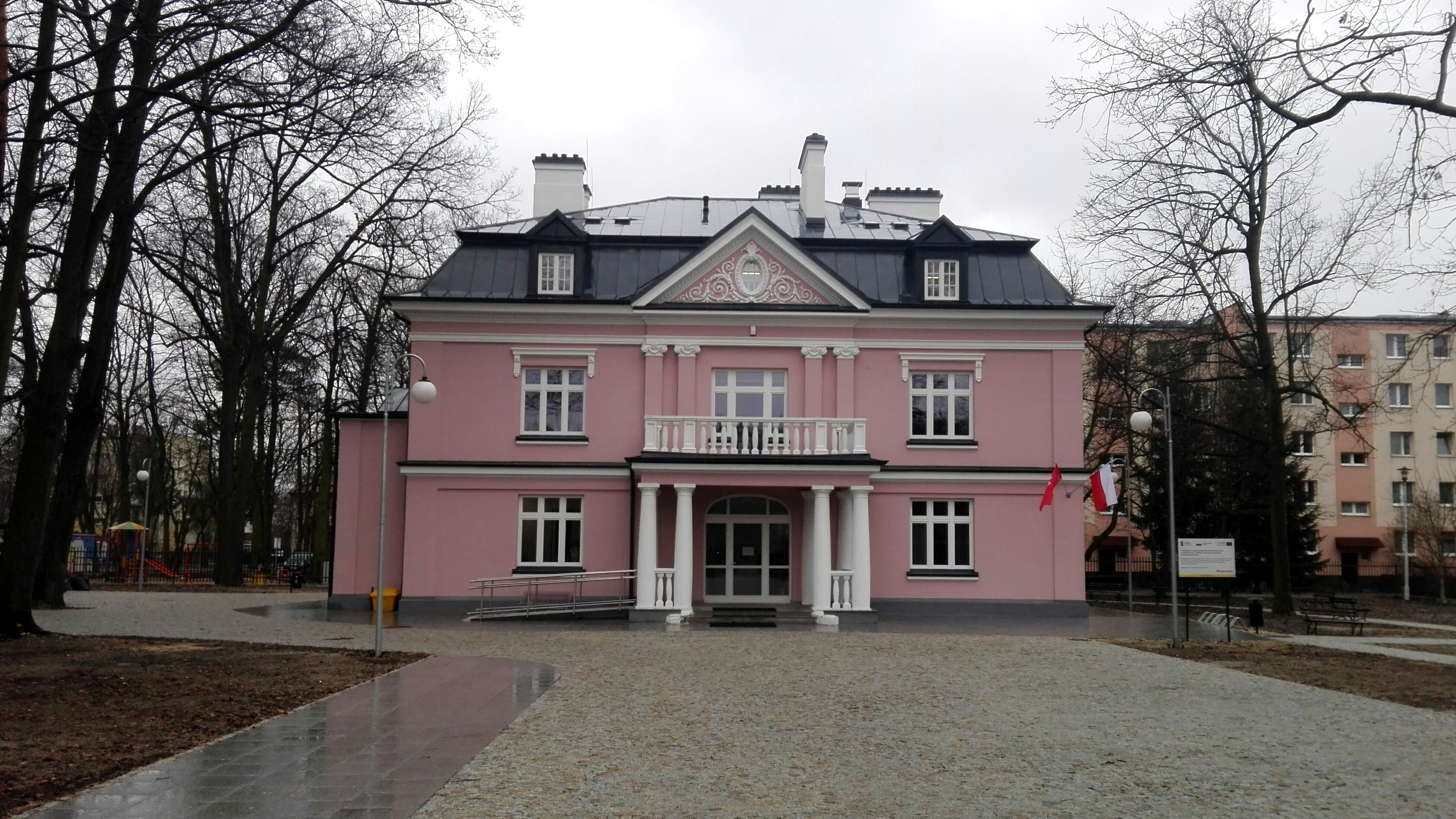
Pedagogical Library
