= First Round Table Pizza restaurant =

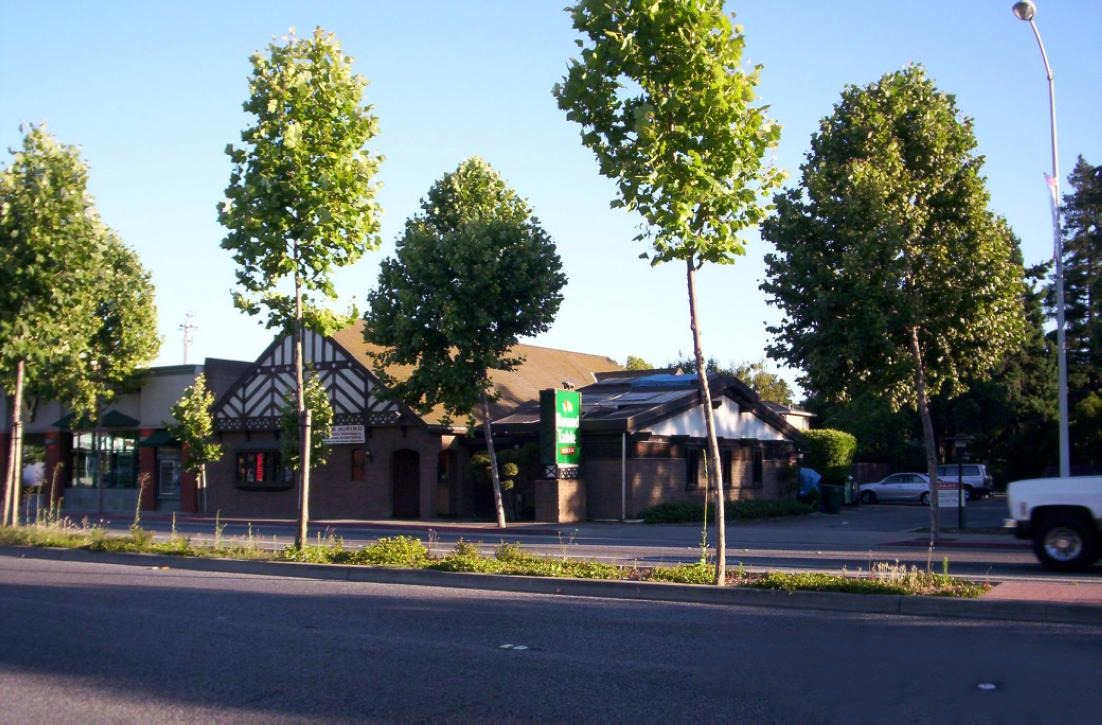
- Interactive map of First Round Table Pizza restaurant

Restaurant information
- Established: December 21, 1959
- Owner: Bob Larson
- Previous owner: Bill Larson
- Manager: Karan Bal
- Food type: Pizza
- Location: 1225 El Camino Real, Menlo Park, California, United States
- Coordinates: 37.4543°N 122.185°W
- Other locations: 1235 El Camino Real (original location)

The first Round Table Pizza restaurant was located in Menlo Park, California, United States. It was opened in 1959.

== History ==
The restaurant was opened by William R. Larson on December 21, 1959 in the old California Water Service building at 1235 El Camino Real, then a few years later, it was moved to its current location at 1225 El Camino Real.

In 1978, Bill Larson bought back the original Menlo Park site after selling the pizza chain; he tore down the older structure, and built a custom Danish Tudor-style building just doors down. In 1987, Bob Larson (Bill's son) and his sister Linda purchased the Round Table Pizza restaurant in Menlo Park from Bill Larson.

In November 2024, Bob Larson sold the original Round Table Pizza in Menlo Park, California, to new franchise owner Karan Bal after running the family landmark for 38 years. Although he still owns the building, Bob Larson decided to step away at age 62, noting he no longer had the same drive for the daily demands of the restaurant business.

== Restaurant ==
This restaurant features two separate dining areas, as well as a separate room for reserved groups and parties. It retains the historic wood furniture and layout from its early years.
