= Willian =

Willian may refer to:

== Places ==
- Willian, Hertfordshire, a small village in North Hertfordshire, England

== People ==
- Willian (footballer, born 1988), Willian Borges da Silva, Grêmio and Brazilian international football winger
- Willian Anicete (born 1994), Brazilian football forward
- Willian Formiga (born 1995), Willian Prado Camargo, Brazilian football left-back
- Willian Pacho (born 2001), Ecuadorian footballer
- Estêvão Willian (born 2007), Brazilian football winger
- Willian (footballer, born 2002), Willian Eduardo Rosa Mateus, Brazilian football forward
- Willian (footballer, born 1983), Willian Xavier Barbosa, Brazilian former football forward
- Willian (footballer, born 1986), Willian Gomes de Siqueira, Brazilian football forward

== See also ==
- Willians (disambiguation)
- William (disambiguation)
