= Bill Nunn (disambiguation) =

Bill Nunn (1953–2016) was an American actor.

William, Bill or Billy Nunn may also refer to:

- William Nunn (1879–1971), British Conservative Party politician
- Bill Nunn (politician) (born 1932), Australian politician
- Bill Nunn (American football) (1924–2014), American sportswriter, newspaper editor and football scout
- Bill Nunn (Australian footballer) (born 1951), Australian rules footballer
- Billy Nunn, keyboard player with the Stone City Band on Rick James' debut album, Come Get It!
- Billy Nunn, science writer and public communicator, known for being youngest person in UK to complete 7 Marathons in 7 Days

== See also ==
- William Nunn Lipscomb Jr. (1919–2011), American Nobel Prize winning chemist
