= Bills =

Bills may refer to:

== Music ==
- "Bills" (song), a 2015 by LunchMoney Lewis
- "Bills", a 1960 song by Louis Jordan
- "Bills", a 1962 song by Denny Denson
- "The Bills", a 1997 piano composition by Carter Pann

== People ==
- Keaton Bills (born 1998), American football player
- Kizziah J. Bills (1860–1924), Black American suffragist, journalist, and civil rights activist
- Michael A. Bills (born 1958) American retired United States Army lieutenant general

== Other uses ==
- Buffalo Bills, an American NFL football team
- Bills (subculture), a Congolese youth subculture in the late 1950s, idolising cowboy Western movies
- "Bills", a Series B episode of the television series QI (2004)

== See also ==
- "Bills, Bills, Bills", a 1999 song by Destiny's Child
- Bill's, a British restaurant chain
- Bill (disambiguation)
