= Willians =

Willians may refer to:

- Willians Bartolomeu dos Santos (born 1973), a Brazilian football player known as Willians
- Ilson Wilians Rodrigues (born 1979) Brazilian football player known as Ilson or Willians
- Willians Domingos Fernandes (born 1986), a Brazilian football player known as Willians
- Willians Santana (born 1988), a Brazilian football player known as Willians
- Willians Astudillo (born 1991), a Venezuelan baseball player
- Willians Mendez Suarez (born 1951), a Cuban Anglican bishop

== See also ==
- Willian (disambiguation)
- William (disambiguation)
- Williams (disambiguation)
