= Amy Grace Maher =

American suffragist

- Maher, from the 1906 yearbook of Smith College
- Born: September 8, 1883; Toledo, Ohio, U.S.
- Died: April 8, 1965 (aged 81); Toledo, Ohio, U.S.
- Occupations: Suffragist, educator, clubwoman
- Father: William H. Maher

Amy Grace Maher (September 8, 1883 – April 8, 1965) was an American suffragist, educator, and clubwoman, based in Toledo, Ohio. She was the first president of the Ohio League of Women Voters, and she studied women workers.

== Early life and education ==
Maher was born in Toledo, the daughter of William H. Maher and Annie Kelsey Maher. Her father was a businessman and writer. She graduated from Smith College in 1906.

== Career ==
Maher taught high school in Toledo after college. She was a suffragist and was a delegate to international suffrage meetings in Paris and Berlin. After suffrage was won, she was the first president of Ohio's League of Women Voters. She organized the Toledo League of Women Voters, the Toledo Consumers League, and the Toledo District Nurse Association. She chaired the Women in Industry committee of the National League of Women Voters, and spoke on women's wages at the national LWV meeting in 1926.

Franklin D. Roosevelt appointed Maher as a technical adviser to the Social Security Board in 1938. She served on the Ohio Commission on Unemployment Insurance. She helped create Toledo's Domestic Relations Court and its vocational high school.

== Publications ==
- "My River" (1903, poem)
- "A Wish" (1904, poem)
- "On Chinese and Japanese Painting" (1918)
- "Women Trade Unionists in the United States" (1925)
- "Ohio's Women Workers" (1929)
- "Effect of Concentration of Industry on Seasonal Variation of Employment" (1930)
- "The Employment of Women" (1931)
- Bookkeepers, Stenographers and Office Clerks in Ohio, 1914 to 1929 (1932)

== Personal life and legacy ==
Maher died in 1965, at the age of 81, in Toledo. Her estate was valued at over $1.5 million dollars; she left a $10,000 bequest to Smith College. Her papers are in the Maher Family Collection at the University of Toledo.
