= Delancey Street Foundation =

US nonprofit organization

- Formation: 1971; 55 years ago
- Founder: John Maher, Mimi Silbert
- Type: California public-benefit nonprofit corporation
- Headquarters: San Francisco, California
- Location: San Francisco, Los Angeles; San Juan Pueblo, New Mexico; Brewster, New York; Greensboro, North Carolina; North Charleston, South Carolina; Stockbridge, Massachusetts
- Key people: Mimi Silbert (co-founder, president)
- Website: delanceystreetfoundation.org

The Delancey Street Foundation, often simply referred to as Delancey Street, is a nonprofit organization based in San Francisco that provides residential rehabilitation services and vocational training programs for substance abusers and convicted criminals. It operates programs across the United States. Residents are reintegrated into mainstream society by running various businesses, including hospitality, transportation, and retail, that are wholly managed by the residents themselves.

== History ==
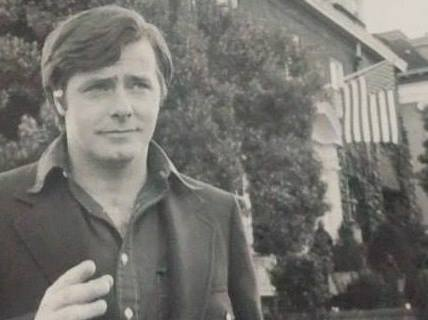
John Maher, founder of the Delancey Street Foundation. Pacific Heights, San Francisco~1973

Delancey Street Foundation was founded in 1971 in San Francisco by John Maher. The program began in an apartment on Polk Street that Maher, a self-described "bum" and "ex-junkie", rented to house people recovering from drug and alcohol use. As the number of people at the apartment increased, the group pooled funds to expand and formalize the organization, initially called Ellis Island and then renamed Delancey Street. It was named after Delancey Street on the Lower East Side of Manhattan, a settling place for immigrants at the turn of the 20th century. According to Maher, "We wanted to get back to the concept of a bunch of wild-eyed fanatics who came over here to build a New Jerusalem and not ask Uncle Nixon for another handout."

Maher was a former member of Synanon, which he had joined in 1962. Delancey Street drew inspiration and methods from Synanon, including the "Game" method of intense, confrontational group therapy; though Mimi Silbert later disavowed any relationship or influence between the two organizations.

Maher could not acquire a loan from a bank. For this reason, he borrowed one thousand dollars from a loan shark for startup funds. The first location was in a Bush Street apartment, but Maher eventually raised enough money to rent the Egyptian Consulate building in the affluent Pacific Heights neighborhood. When neighbors discovered there was a re-educational environment in the neighborhood, several formed a committee to have Delancey Street evicted. Within a year of its founding, the Delancey Street community had grown to 100 members.

Maher met Mimi Silbert, a Boston-bred criminologist and psychologist from UC Berkeley. Silbert began helping Maher structure the foundation. Maher and Silbert also became romantically involved.

In 1974, Delancey Street was instrumental in gaining the release from prison of Wesley Robert Wells. Wells went into the prison system at 19 years of age. By 1974, he had been incarcerated for 46 years, longer than anyone in California. Seven of those years were on Death Row in San Quentin State Prison. The campaign slogan was, "46 Years is Enough." Wells was paroled into the custody of Delancey Street, where he became a resident, and died a year later of natural causes.

In the 1970s, Maher and the foundation became closely linked with Cesar Chavez and his organization, the United Farm Workers. In 1975, Delancey residents worked as part of Cesar Chavez's personal security team, marching in the "Thousand Mile March", culminating in the Farm Workers' convention, where Maher gave a speech.

Maher became friends with one of San Francisco's renowned artists, Dugald Stermer, art director for Ramparts magazine. Dugald became a print media advisor and eventually a councilor, and moved his studio to Delancey Street's Embarcadero Triangle complex. Dugald was involved until his death in 2012. Another Bay Area notable, KSAN-FM radio jock Stefan Ponek, joined Delancey's board of directors. Bill Maher, John's younger brother, who was a resident, graduated from law school, ran for and won the presidency of San Francisco's school board, and then was elected to the San Francisco Board of Supervisors.

During the latter half of the 1970s, Delancey Street acquired an old "dude ranch" in New Mexico, and over the past 40 years has opened facilities in New York, Southern California, North and South Carolina, and Massachusetts. Between 1989 and 1990, the Embarcadero Triangle, a mixed use development with commercial space and 177 apartments on the San Francisco waterfront, was built by Delancey Street members. By 2002, there were 500 residents.

In 1985, Maher left Delancey Street due to personal problems, including an arrest for drunk driving, and Silbert took over running the foundation. Over the years, she has received numerous awards for her foundation work. As of January 2015, Mimi Silbert and six residents from the early 1970s, Abe Irizarry, Jack Behan, Tommy Grapshi, Stephanie Muller, Jerry Raymond and Teri Lynch Delane, have remained to help run the Foundation.

== Constituents ==
The average Delancey Street resident has had 12 years of drug addiction, has been in prison four times, is functionally illiterate, unskilled and has never worked for more than six months. "People who have become involved with gangs, drugs, violence, crime... those are our favorite residents", Silbert said in 1993.

== Rehabilitation model ==
Silbert refers to Delancey Street's approach as mutual restitution: "The residents gain the vocational, personal, interpersonal and social skills necessary to make restitution to the society from which they have taken illegally, consistently and often brutally, for most of their lives. In return Delancey Street demands from society access to the legitimate opportunities from which the majority of residents have been blocked for most of their lives."

The model integrates three areas of development:

1. Academic instruction: residents earn a high school equivalency degree (GED), and then may pursue higher education, including through an in-house Bachelor of Arts program.
2. Vocational training: residents learn three vocational skills, one manual, one clerical/computer and one interpersonal/sales.
3. Social training: residents help others in the community through various volunteer activities.

The model is educational rather than therapeutic, and functions as an extended family rather than a program. The central "each-one-teach-one" principle has residents teaching other residents; there is no professional staff. Traditional family values stress work ethic, mutual restitution, social and personal accountability and responsibility, decency and integrity. Economic self-sufficiency and social entrepreneurialism are cornerstones. One project developed under this model is Delancey Street's headquarters, the Embarcadero Triangle, a $50 million, 400,000 square foot multi-use development, covering an entire city block on the San Francisco waterfront, completed in 1990. Silbert was the developer, Delancey Street the general contractor, and some 300 largely unskilled residents handled construction, learning on the job. The four-storey complex includes retail stores, a restaurant, a screening room, a café bookstore and art gallery, and housing units for 500.

The minimum stay at Delancey Street is two years, while the average resident remains for almost four years. Any act of violence, or threat of violence, is cause for immediate removal from the program. Residents learn to work together, promoting non-violence, with each new resident responsible for helping guide the next arrival. There is a complete ban on alcohol, drugs and threatening behavior.

In 1998, Delancey Street launched the Life Learning Academy, a San Francisco Unified School District charter high school, "committed to creating a nonviolent community for students who have not been successful in traditional school settings". School capacity is about 50 students, with small classes of, typically, six to eight students. In 2018, construction was begun on a 6,000 square foot dormitory, to accommodate up to 20 live-in students, with free room and board.

In spring 2000, through San Francisco State University, a cohort of Delancey Street students embarked on an innovative program, with several earning a BA in Urban Studies in 2004. Classes were taught on-site by volunteering university professors and community leaders. The curriculum was the same as for regular on-campus students, while courses were offered free of charge.

As of 2020, there were over 23,000 graduates of the program.

== Residential communities ==
Delancey Street operates six residential education communities in the US, located in San Francisco (headquarters); Los Angeles; San Juan Pueblo, New Mexico; Brewster, New York; Greensboro, North Carolina; and North Charleston, South Carolina; and an arts training facility for program graduates, in Stockbridge, Massachusetts.

== Businesses ==
Delancey Street creates and runs business enterprises that serve as training schools and generate operating revenue. Since 1972, these companies include catering and event planning, restaurant, café, bookstore & art gallery, corporate private car service, digital print shop, handcrafted furniture, ironworks, plants & glass, ceramics, landscaping, moving and trucking, paratransit van & bus services, screening room, specialty advertising sales, and Christmas tree sales and decorating. Delancey Street is also chartered as a federally-insured credit union.

From its inception, Delancey Street has been financially self-sustaining, and does not accept government funding. As of 2003, about half of the $15 million annual operating costs came from business income, supplemented by donations. As of that year, more than 10,000 ex-cons and the homeless had been provided with housing, food, and a job at one of the many businesses the foundation operated.
