= Uilleam =

- Gender: Masculine
- Language: Scottish Gaelic

Other names
- Cognate: William

Uilleam is a masculine given name in the Scottish Gaelic language. It is the equivalent of the name William in English.

== List of people with the given name ==
- Uilleam, Earl of Mar
- Uilleam I, Earl of Ross
- Uilleam II, Earl of Ross
- Uilleam III, Earl of Ross
- Uilleam Uallas
