= William Lane (disambiguation) =

William Lane (1861–1917) was a journalist and pioneer of the Australian labour movement.

William Lane may also refer to:

== Politicians ==
- William Lane (died c. 1438), Member of Parliament (MP) for Canterbury
- William Lane (fl. 1571), MP for Northampton
- William Lane (died 1618) (1553–1618), MP for Northamptonshire and Gatton
- William J. Lane (1905–1976), Pennsylvania politician
- William Lane-Mitchell (1861–1940), British Conservative Party politician
- William Preston Lane Jr. (1892–1967), Governor of Maryland
- William Carr Lane (1789–1863), doctor and first mayor of St. Louis
- William John Lane (1849–?), British Member of Parliament for East Cork, 1885–1892

== Others ==
- William Lane (bookseller) (1746–1814), London bookseller
- William Lane (cricketer) (1845–1939), English banker, magistrate and cricketer
- William Lane (priest), a Canon of Windsor from 1403 to 1404
- William H. Lane (1923–1980), CEO of Riviana Foods and chairman of Augusta National Golf Club
- W. L. Lane (fl. 1910s), secretary manager of the English football club Darlington
- William L. Lane (1931–1999), American New Testament theologian and professor of biblical studies
- William Lane Craig (born 1949), American analytic philosopher, philosophical theologian, and Christian apologist
- Sir William Arbuthnot Lane, 1st Baronet (1856–1943), British surgeon and physician
- William Lane (horn player), American French horn player and long-time Principal Horn of the Los Angeles Philharmonic
- William Coolidge Lane (1859–1931), American librarian and historian
- Master Juba (c. 1825–1852/3), stage name of dancer and minstrel performer William Henry Lane
- Billy Lane (born 1970), motorcycle manufacturer
- Bill Lane (disambiguation), multiple people
