= Bill Doran =

Bill Doran may refer to:

- Bill Doran (motorcyclist) (1916–1973), Grand Prix motorcycle road racer
- Bill Doran (second baseman) (born 1958), American baseball second baseman
- Bill Doran (third baseman) (1898–1978), American baseball third baseman
- William Doran (1834–1903), mayor of Hamilton, Ontario
- William C. Doran (1884–1965), associate justice of the California Court of Appeal
