= Bill Lane =

Bill Lane may refer to:

- Bill Lane (baseball), American baseball player
- Bill Lane (basketball) (1916–1997), American basketball player
- Bill Lane (ornithologist) (1922–2000), Australian amateur ornithologist
- Bill Lane (diplomat) (1919–2010), American publisher and diplomat
- William H. Lane (1923–1980), CEO of Riviana Foods and chairman of Augusta National Golf Club

== See also ==
- William Lane (disambiguation)
