= Ian Bill =

Scottish footballer

Personal information
- Full name: Ian Millar Bill
- Date of birth: 4 September 1944 (age 82)
- Place of birth: Dalziel, Scotland
- Position: Left winger

Youth career
- Glasgow University

Senior career*
Years	Team	Apps	(Gls)
1969–1971	Queen's Park	61	(9)

International career
1970–1971	Scotland Amateurs	2	(0)
- * Club domestic league appearances and goals

Ian Millar Bill (born 4 September 1944) is a Scottish retired football left winger who played in the Scottish League for Queen's Park. He was capped by Scotland at amateur level.
