= Willian (footballer, born 2002) =

Brazilian footballer

Personal information
- Full name: Willian Eduardo Rosa Mateus
- Date of birth: 11 March 2002 (age 24)
- Position: Forward

Team information
- Current team: Caxias

Youth career
- –2019: Caxias

Senior career*
Years	Team	Apps	(Gls)
2019–	Caxias	4	(0)
- * Club domestic league appearances and goals as of 16:14, 24 November 2021 (UTC)

Willian Eduardo Rosa Mateus (born 11 March 2002), commonly known as Willian, is a Brazilian footballer who currently plays as a forward for Caxias.

== Career statistics ==
=== Club ===
As of 24 November 2021.

Club	Season	League			State League		Cup		Other		Total	
Club	Season	Division	Apps	Goals	Apps	Goals	Apps	Goals	Apps	Goals	Apps	Goals
Caxias	2019	Série D	0	0	0	0	0	0	3 (Note: Appearances in the Copa FGF)	1	3	1
Caxias	2020	Série D	0	0	2 (Note: Appearances in the Campeonato Gaúcho)	0	0	0	0	0	2	0
Caxias	2021	Série D	0	0	2	0	0	0	0	0	2	0
Career total			0	0	4	0	0	0	3	1	7	1
