= William H. Maher =

American business writer (1846–1913)

William H. Maher (1846–1913) was an American businessman and author.

== Biography ==
Mayer lived at Windsor Locks, Connecticut, where he was involved with the Young Men's Club. He was a cutlery dealer in Toledo, Ohio. He married Anne Kelsey (c. 1840-1919); their daughter, Amy Grace Maher (1883–1965), was a suffragist and social welfare worker in Toledo. Some letters to him are held at the library of the University of Toledo.

== Works ==
- On the road to riches: practical hints for clerks and young business men, 1878
- A man of samples: something about the men he met "on the road", 1888
- A little trip to Jamaica, 1909
