= Nancy McFadden =

American lawyer (?-2018)

- Born: 1958/1959
- Died: March 22, 2018 (aged 59)
- Occupation: Lawyer

Nancy McFadden (1958/1959-March 22, 2018) was an American lawyer who worked as an advisor to Bill Clinton and Jerry Brown. She also served as the chief of staff under the Jerry Brown administration.

== Biography ==
Born in Wilmington, Delaware, McFadden received her early education in California. She was a graduate of San José State University and the University of Virginia.

After graduating from law school, McFadden clerked for the United States Court of Federal Claims before joining O'Melveny & Myers.

From 2011 until her death in 2018, McFadden was the Chief of Staff to the Governor of California. Previously, she served as a deputy chief of staff to Vice President Al Gore.
