= Bill Nunn (Australian footballer) =

Australian rules footballer (1951–2022)

Personal information
- Full name: William Nunn
- Born: 6 May 1951
- Died: 22 February 2022 (aged 70)
- Original teams: St Dominics, Broadmeadows
- Height: 183 cm (6 ft 0 in)
- Weight: 77 kg (170 lb)

Playing career^{1}
Years	Club	Games (Goals)
1971–73	North Melbourne	24 (2)
1975–76	Brunswick (VFA)	
- ^{1} Playing statistics correct to the end of 1973.

Bill Nunn (6 May 1951 – 22 February 2022) was an Australian rules footballer who played with North Melbourne in the Victorian Football League (VFL).
