= Bill Barrett (disambiguation) =

Bill Barrett (1929–2016) was an American politician.

Bill Barrett may also refer to:

- Bill Barrett (artist) (born 1934), American jeweller, painter, and sculptor
- Bill Barrett (Māori leader) (1878–1953), New Zealand tribal leader, land court agent, and trust board secretary
- Bill Barrett (outfielder) (1900–1951), American baseball player
- Bill Barrett (swimmer) (born 1960), American swimmer
- Bill Barrett (utility player), American baseball player
- Bill Barrett Corporation, American natural gas and oil exploration and development company

== See also ==
- William Barrett (disambiguation)
