= Bill Allison =

Bill Allison may refer to:

- Bill Allison (actor) (1930–2016), American casino owner and actor
- Bill Allison (baseball) (c. 1850–1887), American baseball player
- Bill Allison (footballer) (1908–1981), English footballer
