= Mimi Silbert =

American nonprofit organization executive

Mimi Halper Silbert serves as the chairman of the board, president, and CEO of the Delancey Street Foundation, a residential educational community that provides ex-felons, sex workers, substance abusers, and others with academic, vocational, and social skills. Silbert was the developer of Delancey Street's headquarters, which houses 500 residents as well as of retail, educational, and recreational facilities.

== Early life and education ==
Silbert was born in Boston, MA in 1942. She holds a bachelor's degree in English from the University of Massachusetts Amherst (1963), and master's (1965) and doctorate degrees (1968) in counseling psychology and criminology from UC Berkeley.

== Delancey Street Foundation ==
As the head of Delancey Street Foundation, Silbert oversees the enterprises staffed by Delancey Street residents, which include a moving company, restaurants and catering, a screening room, and other businesses.

== Awards and recognition ==
Silbert has been awarded 10 honorary doctorate degrees, including Brandeis (2006), UMass (1995), Golden Gate University (1997), and San Francisco State University (1993). She was awarded UC Berkeley’s Alumni of the Year in 1991.

Silbert has also been recognized and honored by federal, state, and municipal leaders. Silbert has received official mentions during sessions of the United States Senate and the United States Congress by Senator Dianne Feinstein, Senator Barbara Boxer, and Congressmember Mel Levine. Silbert has received six mayoral proclamations of “Mimi Silbert Days” in San Francisco, most recently in 2008. She was awarded the first Minerva Lifetime Achievement Award in 2004 from former California First Lady Maria Shriver. In 2014, the California Museum inducted Silbert into the California Hall of Fame. Also in 2014, the Port of San Francisco designated a stretch of sidewalk along the San Francisco Bay the "Mimi Silbert Pathway."

She has also received awards and recognition from national organizations and news programs. In 1992, the League of Women Voters named her one of their "Women Who Could Be President." In 1989, she was featured on ABC's 20/20 in a segment entitled “The Power of Mimi”.

In the business world, Silbert has been featured in books and articles on the subject of social entrepreneurship, including profiles in the London Financial Times, Fast Company, and Worth Magazine.

From religious organizations, Silbert received the Pope John XXIII Award from the Italian Catholic Federation and the Valor Award from the Jewish National Fund.

== Criminal justice work ==
In addition to her work with Delancey Street, Silbert is also a recognized national expert in criminal justice. Silbert has served on federal and state corrections commissions and advisory boards, including: the National Institute of Justice Advisory Board, appointed by President Jimmy Carter (1980); the California Board of State and Community Corrections, appointed by every California governor from George Deukmejian (1986) through Arnold Schwarzenegger; the State Advisory Group on Juvenile Justice and Delinquency, appointed by Governors Gray Davis and Schwarzenegger; the Blue Ribbon Commission in Inmate Program Management, appointed by the California Legislature; and the California Expert Panel on Corrections.

She also wrote, designed and implemented a revamp of San Francisco's juvenile justice system.

== Selected bibliography ==
- Silbert, Mimi H.; Pines, Ayala M.; Lynch, Teri (1980). Sexual assault of prostitutes: phase one. Grant No. RO1-MH-32782-01. Washington D.C.: Delancey Street Foundation, National Institute of Mental Health. OCLC 45111118.
- Silbert, Mimi H.; Pines, Ayala M. (June 1982). "Entrance into prostitution". Youth & Society. 13 (4): 471–500. doi:10.1177/0044118X82013004005. S2CID 144906858.
