= The Bill (band) =

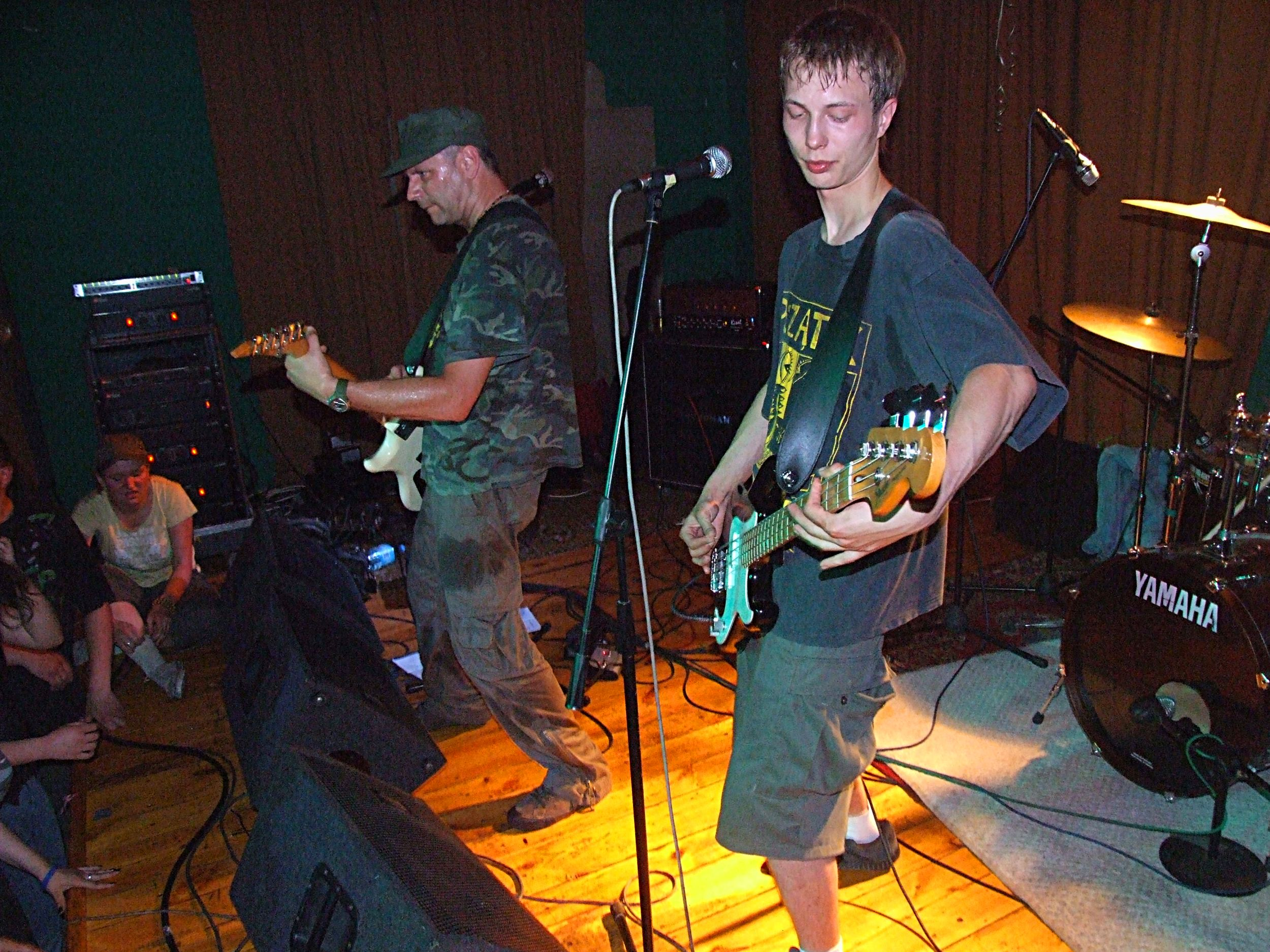
The Bill

The Bill is a Polish punk rock band, formed in 1988 by Artur "Soko" Soczewica, in the Polish town of Pionki. The band's name is pronounced in a similar way to the Polish word 'debil', which means 'moron'. The Bill played several times at the Jarocin Festival and The Great Orchestra of Christmas Charity finales.

== Past Band members ==
- Jacek "Szmery" Szulikowski - drumset (1988-1989)
- Robert "Mielony" Mielniczuk - drumset (1989-2011)
- Artur "Soko" Soczewica - bass guitar, vocals (left band after "I give you fire" album in 1996)
- Dariusz "Skóra" Stawski - vocals (Played with the band, but was never an official member)
- "Jędrek" - guitar (2000 - 2005)
- "Ludek" - bass guitar (2000 - 2005)
- Maciej "McKurczak" Stępień - bass guitar, vocals (2005 - 2010)

== Current band members ==
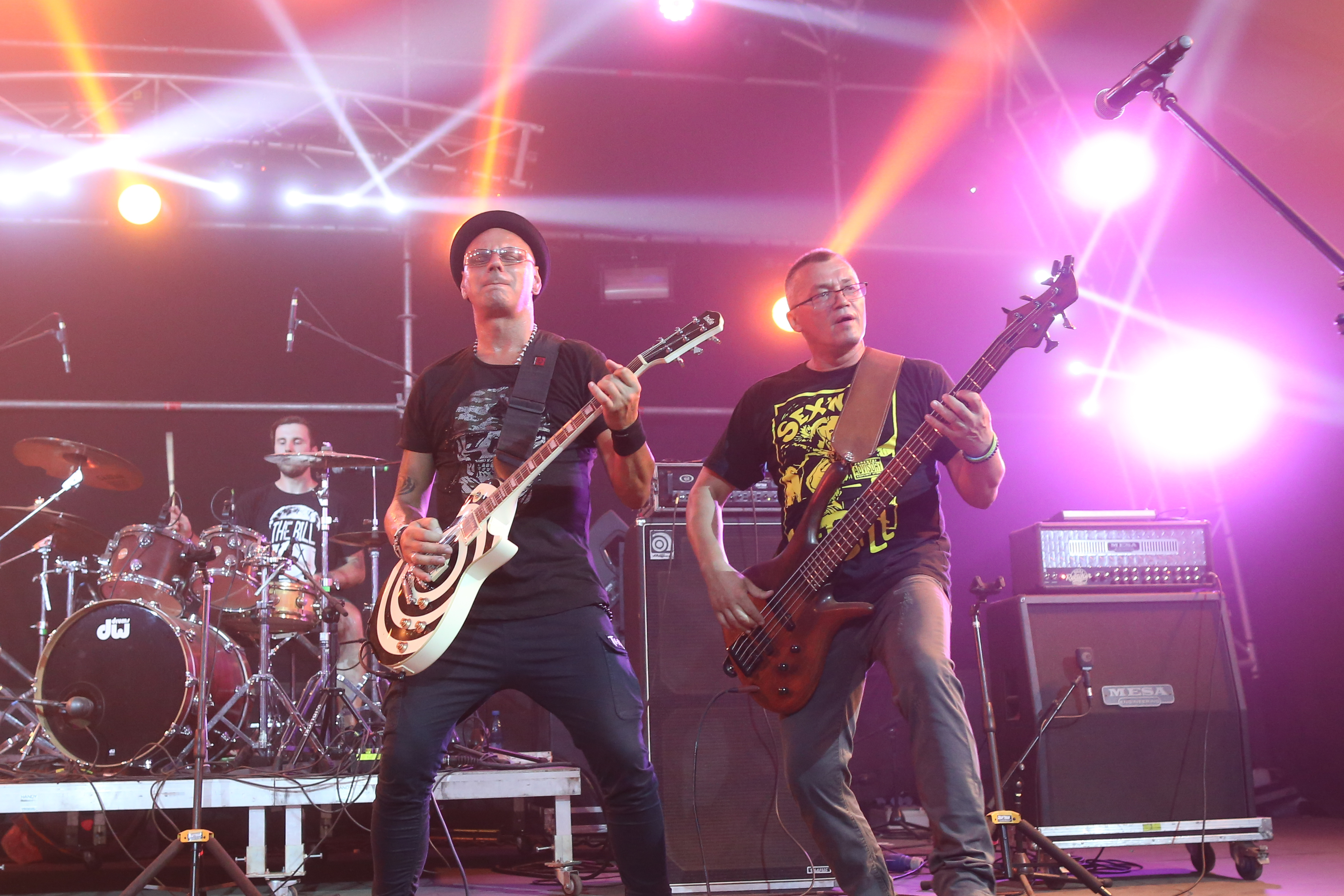
2017 at Przystanek Woodstock

- Dariusz "Kefir" Śmietanka - guitar, vocal
- Gerard "Gere" Chodyra - bass guitar
- Sebastian Stańczak - guitar, vocal
- Artur "Artie" Woźniak - drumset

== Discography ==
- 1993 - The Biut (pronounced similar to 'debiut' meaning 'debut')
- 1994 - Początek Końca (The Beginning of the End)
- 1995 - Sex 'N' Roll
- 2000 - Daję wam ogień (I Give You Fire) - recorded in 1996, but not released until 2000
- 2007 - Niech tańczą aniołowie (Let the Angels Dance)
- 2013 - 8siem
