= Big Bill Creek =

Stream in the state of Montana

Coordinates: 47°55′31″N 113°23′25″W

Big Bill Creek is a stream in the U.S. state of Montana. It is a tributary to the Spotted Bear River.

Big Bill Creek was named in 1914 after a trail supervisor.
