= William Gates =

William, Bill, or Willie Gates may refer to:

== Sportsmen ==
- Pop Gates (William Penn Gates, 1917–1999), American basketball player
- Bill Gates (footballer) (1944–2023), English central defender for Middlesbrough
- William Gates (basketball) (born 1971), American guard, subject of 1994 film Hoop Dreams
- Willie Gates (born 1987), American mixed martial artist

== Others ==
- Bill Gates (born 1955), American business magnate and co-founder of Microsoft Corporation
- William Gates (soldier) (1788–1868), American Army officer who served 66 years
- William E. Gates (1863–1940), American archeologist of Mayan language
- William Thomas George Gates (1908–1990), British banker and expert on Africa
- Bill Gates Sr. (1925–2020), American attorney and philanthropist, father of Bill Gates
- ill.Gates (born 1982), Canadian electronic music producer and DJ, parodying name of Bill Gates
- Charles H. Gates (1854–1933), also known as Bill Gate, American frontiersman and fortune hunter

== See also ==
- "Bill Gates", song by American rapper Lil Wayne from 2010 album I Am Not a Human Being
