= Big Bill Mountain =

Mountain in the state of Montana

Coordinates: 47.944°N 113.374°W

Big Bill Mountain is a summit in Flathead County, Montana. The elevation is 6,588 feet (2,008 m).

Big Bill Mountain was named in 1914 after a trail supervisor.
