= William Larson (businessman) =

American businessman (1933–2006)

William R. Larson
- Born: January 30, 1933; San Jose, California
- Died: November 15, 2006 (aged 73); Palo Alto, California
- Education: Palo Alto High School
- Title: Founder of Round Table Pizza
- Family: Bob Larson (son)

William Ray Larson (January 30, 1933 – November 15, 2006) was an American businessman, and the founder of Round Table Pizza.

== Life and career ==
Larson was born in San Jose, California, on January 30, 1933, and was raised in Palo Alto, California. He attended local schools in Palo Alto such as Palo Alto High School, who later left school and joined the U.S. Navy.

After serving 4 years in the U.S. Navy, Larson worked several different jobs, gaining experience that ultimately led him to create his own restaurant. He opened his first pizza parlor in Menlo Park, California on December 21, 1959 located at 1235 El Camino Real, which was later moved to 1225 El Camino Real a few years later, and was owned by Bob Larson since 1987. He named his new restaurant Round Table Pizza after the round redwood tables he and his father constructed.

This original location in Menlo Park is now operated by franchise owner Karan Bal since 2024.

After the success of the original Menlo Park location, Bill Larson started expanding across California in 1962. In 1978, Larson sold the restaurant franchise, and after that, Bill Larson repurchased the original Menlo Park location, demolishing the older structure, and built a custom Danish Tudor-style building just doors down.

== Death ==
Larson died in Palo Alto, California on November 15, 2006, at the age of 73 after a long battle with cancer.
