= Bill's =

British restaurant and bar chain

Coordinates: 50.8741°N 0.0166°E

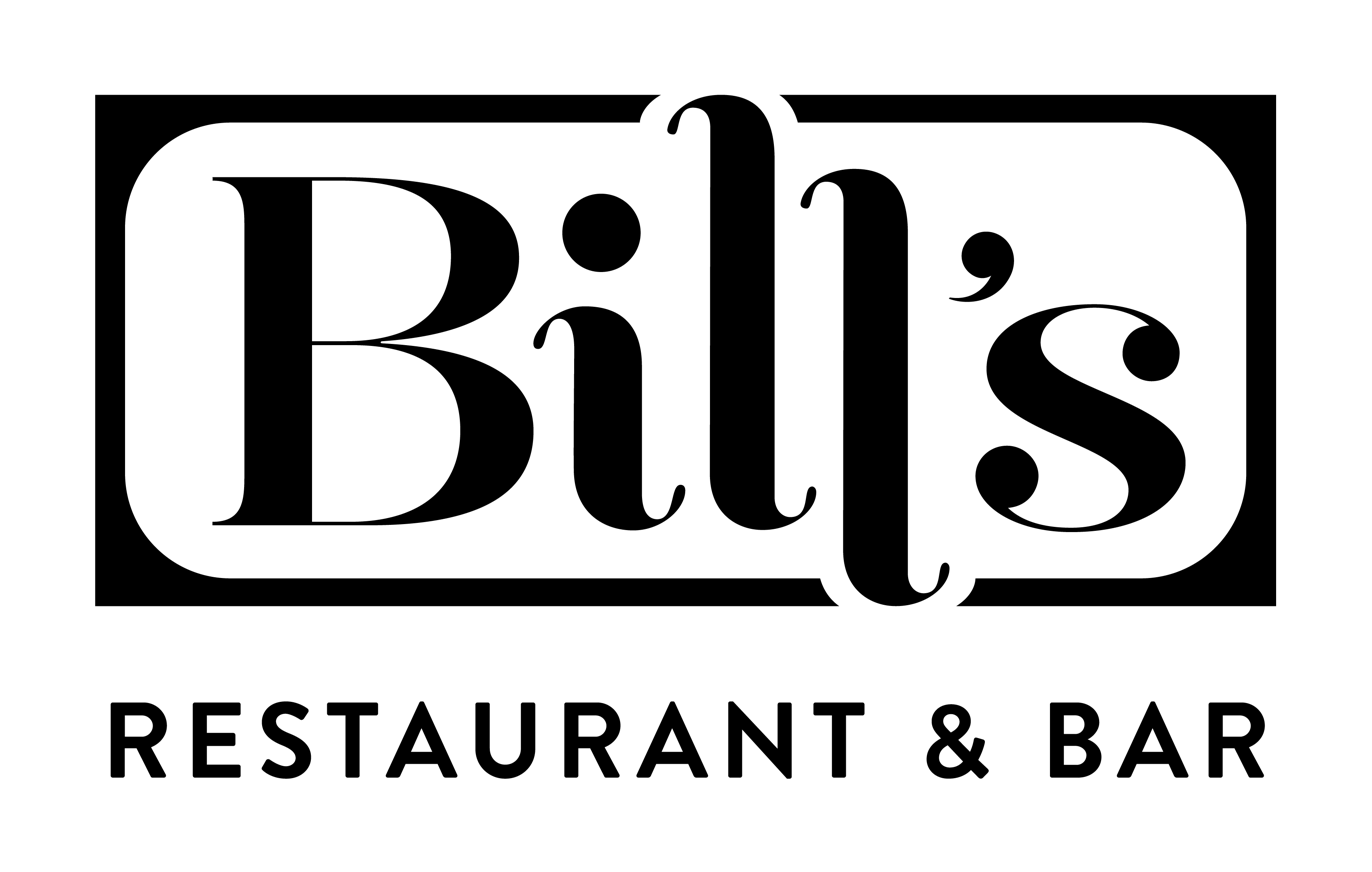

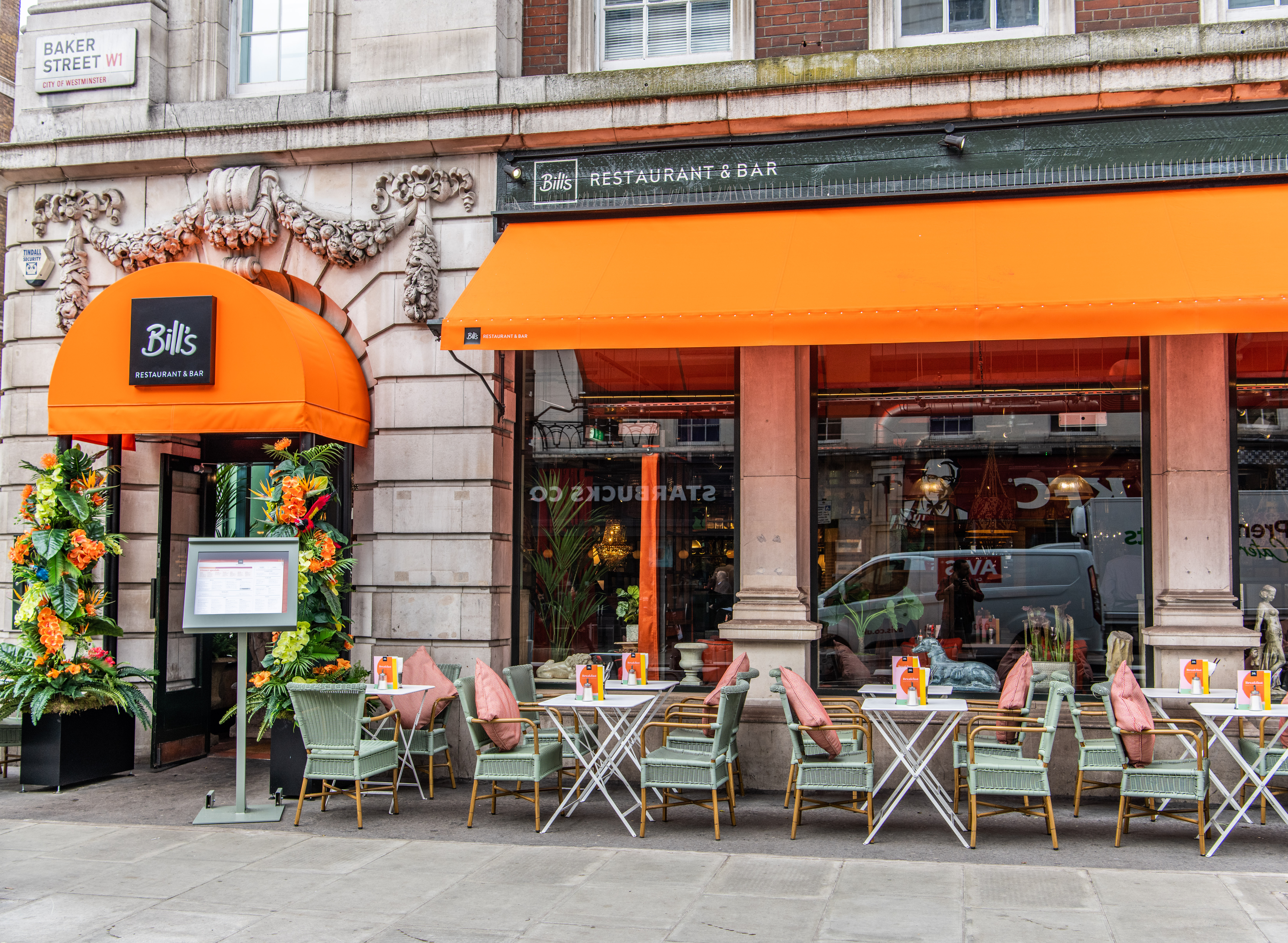
- Company type: Private company
- Industry: Casual dining
- Genre: British, Contemporary European
- Founded: 2000, Lewes, United Kingdom
- Founders: Bill Collison
- Headquarters: London, United Kingdom
- Key people: Richard Caring
- Website: bills-website.co.uk

Bill's is a British restaurant and bar chain, founded by Bill Collison in 2001 when he opened a small greengrocery in Lewes, East Sussex.

== History ==
The first restaurant was founded in Lewes, East Sussex. It began as a greengrocer's, but after a flood, a cafe was added to the shop. In 2008, Richard Caring acquired a major shareholding in Bill's, at which time it had two restaurants. Since then, there has been an expansion in the number of restaurants around the UK.
