= Little Bill (disambiguation) =

Little Bill is the star of an animated television series and the Bill Cosby book series of the same name.

Little Bill may also refer to:

== People ==
- Bill Gaither (blues musician) (1910–1970), US blues guitarist and singer
- Bill Johnston (tennis) (1894–1946), US tennis player unofficially co-ranked world number 1 in 1919 and 1922
- Bill Raidler (c. 1870–1904), US Old West outlaw and member of the Doolin-Dalton Gang
- Bill Sowders (1864–1951), US Major League Baseball pitcher
- Bill Standifer (1853–1903), US Old West gunman and lawman

== Other uses ==
- Little Bill, villain of the 1992 Western film Unforgiven, played by Gene Hackman
- Mount Little Bill, a mountain in Victoria, Australia (see Deddick River)

== See also ==
- Big Bill (disambiguation)
- Bill (disambiguation)
