= Wilhelm =

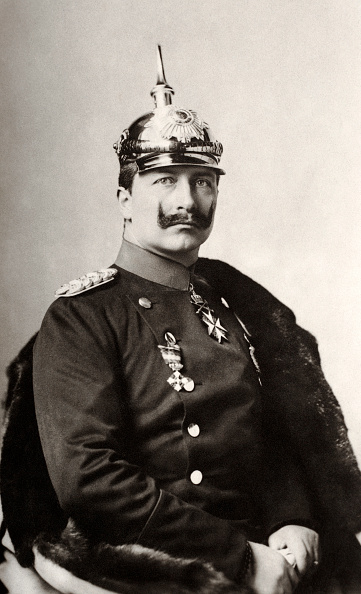
- Kaiser Wilhelm II
- Pronunciation: /ˈwɪlhɛlm, ˈvɪl-/; German: [ˈvɪlhɛlm]
- Gender: Masculine
- Language: Germanic languages

Origin
- Origin: wille + helm (protection)
- Meaning: Vehement protector
- Region of origin: Germany

Other names
- Related names: Guglielmo, Guilherme, Guillaume, Guillem, Guillermo, Vilhelm, Vilhelms, Vilho, Villem, Willem, William

Wilhelm is a German given name and a cognate of the English name William. The feminine form is Wilhelmine.

== People with the given name ==
- Wilhelm I, (1797–1888), King of Prussia and German Emperor
- Wilhelm II (1859–1941), grandson of the former, King of Prussia and German Emperor
- Prince Wilhelm (disambiguation)
- Wilhelm Aarek (1907–1999), Norwegian philologist and educationalist
- Wilhelm Aarstad (1854–1933), Norwegian politician
- Wilhelm Ludwig Abeken (1813–1843), German archaeologist
- Wilhelm Abel (1904–1985), German economist
- Wilhelm Abeln (1894–1969), German politician
- Wilhelm Achtermann (1799–1884), German sculptor
- Wilhelm Ackermann (1896–1962), German mathematician
- Wilhelm Heinrich Ackermann (1789–1848), German teacher
- Wilhelm Adam (1893–1978), German military officer and politician
- Wilhelm Adam (general) (1877–1949), German general
- Wilhelm Adolf, German luger
- Wilhelm Adolph (1729–1781), German composer
- Wilhelm Agrell (born 1950), Swedish writer and historian
- Wilhelm Ahlwardt (1828–1909), German orientalist
- Wilhelm Ahrens (1872–1927), German officer and Knight's Cross recipient
- Wilhelm Albermann (1835–1913), German sculptor
- Wilhelm Albers (1840–1904), American politician
- Wilhelm von Apell (1892–1969), German general
- Wilhelm Arndt (1838–1895), German historian
- Wilhelm Aschwanden (born 1969), Swiss cross-country skier
- Wilhelm Herman Barth (1813–1896), Danish musician, composer, and music theorist
- Wilhelm Baum (historian) (born 1948), Austrian historian, theologian and philosopher
- Wilhelm Baum (surgeon) (1799–1883), German surgeon
- Wilhelm Baumann (handballer) (1912-1990), German handball player
- Wilhelm Baumann (politician) (1925–2015), German politician
- Wilhelm Boger (1906–1977), German concentration camp overseer
- Wilhelm Bohnstedt (1888–1947), German general
- Wilhelm Bungert (born 1939), German tennis player
- Wilhelm Amsinck Burchard-Motz (1878–1963), German lawyer and national-liberal politician
- Wilhelm Burgdorf (1895–1945), German army general
- Wilhelm Carpelan (1778–1829), Swedish baron and official
- Wilhelm Maximilian Carpelan (1787–1830), Finnish-Swedish surveyor and cartographer
- Wilhelm Carstens (1869–1941), German rower
- Wilhelm Cauer (1900–1945), German mathematician and scientist
- Wilhelm Cerny (born 1955), Austrian footballer
- Wilhelm von Christ (1831–1906), German classical scholar
- Wilhelm Frimann Koren Christie (1778–1849), Norwegian politician
- Wilhelm Frimann Koren Christie (1885–1956) (1885–1956), Norwegian Nazi collaborator
- Wilhelm Christopher Christophersen (1832–1913), Norwegian diplomat
- Wilhelm Dörpfeld (1853–1940), German architect and archaeologist
- Wilhelm Dörr (1881–1955), German track and field athlete
- Wilhelm Dörr (Nazi) (1921–1945), German SS soldier and concentration camp guard
- Wilhelm Dreesen (1840–1926), German-Danish photographer
- Wilhelm Erben (1864–1933), Austrian historian
- Wilhelm Ferdinand Erichson (1809–1848), German entomologist and doctor
- Wilhelm Ernst (1905–1952), German chess player
- Wilhelm Ludwig von Eschwege (1777–1855), German geologist, geographer
- Wilhelm Eschweiler (1860–1936), German chemist
- Wilhelm von Essen (1879–1972), Swedish equestrian
- Wilhelm Esser (1798–1854), German philosopher and classical philologist
- Wilhelm von Essern (1565–1616), Prince-Bishop of Worms
- Wilhelm Fabry (1560–1634), German surgeon
- Wilhelm Facklam (1893–1972), German painter
- Wilhelm Hansen Færden (1852–1923), Norwegian military officer and politician
- Wilhelm Fahlbusch (1892–1916), German flying ace
- Wilhelm Fahlbusch (Flak officer) (1914–2006), German general and Knight's Cross recipient
- Wilhelm Fahrmbacher (1888–1970), German WWII General
- Wilhelm von Finck (1848–1924), German entrepreneur and banker
- Wilhelm Fischer (boxer) (born 1972), German boxer
- Wilhelm Fischer (musicologist) (1886–1962), Austrian musicologist
- Wilhelm Fischer (politician) (1904–1951), German politician
- Wilhelm Siegmund Frei (1885–1943), German dermatologist
- Wilhelm Freund (1806–1894), German philologist
- Wilhelm Alexander Freund (1833–1917), German gynecologist
- Wilhelm Salomon Freund (1831–1915), German lawyer and politician
- Wilhelm Friberg (1865–1932), Swedish football manager
- Wilhelm Frick (1877–1946), German Nazi Party politician
- Wilhelm Frickart (born 1893), German World War I flying ace
- Wilhelm L. Friedell (1883–1958), American submarine commander
- Wilhelm Fröhner (1834–1925), French art historian
- Wilhelm Frölich (c. 1492 – 1562), Swiss military commander
- Wilhelm Fuchs (1898–1947), German SS officer
- Wilhelm Fuhrmann (1833–1904), German mathematician
- Wilhelm Heinrich Funk (1866–1949), German-American painter
- Wilhelm Egon von Fürstenberg (1629–1704), German count, prince and clergyman
- Wilhelm Furtwängler (1886–1954), German conductor and composer
- Wilhelm Füssli (1830–1916), Swiss portrait artist
- Wilhelm Germann (1840–1902), German Protestant theologian and missionary
- Wilhelm Gerstenmeier (1908–1944), German member of the SS
- Wilhelm Gesenius (1786–1842), German orientalist and theologian
- Wilhelm Gideon (1898–1977), German Schutzstaffel officer
- Wilhelm Gnapheus (1493–1568), Dutch-born Protestant religious figure
- Wilhelm Göcke (1898–1944), German Nazi concentration camp commandant
- Wilhelm Grillo (1819–1889), German industrialist
- Wilhelm Grimm (1786–1859), German author
- Wilhelm Grimm (politician) (1889–1944), German Nazi official and alleged 20 July plotter
- Wilhelm Grimmelmann (1893–1958), Danish gymnast
- Wilhelm Christian Benecke von Gröditzberg (1779–1860), German banker and merchant
- Wilhelm von Hanno (1826–1882), German-born Norwegian architect
- Wilhelm Hansen (art collector) (1868–1936), Danish businessman and art collector
- Wilhelm Hansen (footballer) (1895-1974), Norwegian footballer
- Wilhelm Hansen (politician) (1776–1851), Norwegian politician
- Wilhelm Hansen (rower) (1884–1931), Norwegian rower
- Wilhelm Hester (1872–1947), American photographer
- Wilhelm Hetling (1740–1798), Baltic German politician
- Wilhelm Heuer (1813–1890), German lithographer
- Wilhelm Höffert (1832–1901), German photographer
- Wilhelm Hofmeister (1824–1877), German biologist and botanist
- Wilhelm Hofmeister (automobile designer) (1912–1978), German automobile designer
- Wilhelm von Homburg (1940–2004), German boxer and actor
- Wilhelm von Humboldt (1767–1835), German philosopher
- Wilhelm Ihne (1821–1902), German historian
- Wilhelm Imkamp (born 1951), German Catholic prelate and theologian
- Wilhelm Ingves (born 1990), Finnish footballer
- Wilhelm Iwan (1871–1958), German historian
- Wilhelm Jacoby (1855–1925), German playwright
- Wilhelm Jahn (1835–1900), Austrian conductor
- Wilhelm Jahn (SA general) (1891–1952), German Nazi SA general
- Wilhelm Jakobs (1858–1942), German railway engineer
- Wilhelm Jannasch (1888–1966), German Protestant theologian and clergyman
- Wilhelm Jelinek (born 1994), Austrian handball player
- Wilhelm Jensen (1837–1911), German writer
- Wilhelm Jerusalem (1854–1923), Austrian-Jewish philosopher
- Wilhelm Jobst (1912–1947), German physician and convicted war criminal
- Wilhelm Joest (1852–1897), German ethnographer
- Wilhelm Johannsen (1857–1927), Danish botanist and geneticist
- Wilhelm John (1877–1934), Austrian general, museum director and military historian
- Wilhelm Johnen (1921–2002), German World War II fighter pilot
- Wilhelm Jordaens (died 1372), Augustinian canon of Groenendael Priory
- Wilhelm Jordan (geodesist) (1842–1899), German geodesist
- Wilhelm Junghans (1834–1865), German historian
- Wilhelm Junk (1866–1942), Czech antiquarian bookseller and entomologist
- Wilhelm Junker (1840–1892), Russian explorer in Africa
- Wilhelm Jürgensen (1762–1842), Norwegian military officer
- Wilhelm Keitel (1882–1946), German field marshal and war criminal
- Wilhelm Kempf (born 1947), Austrian psychologist
- Wilhelm Kempf (bishop) (1906–1982), German Catholic theologian and bishop
- Wilhelm Koppers (1886–1961), Austrian Catholic priest and cultural anthropologist
- Wilhelm Körner (1839–1925), German chemist
- Wilhelm Heinrich Detlev Körner (1878–1938), American illustrator
- Wilhelm Frimann Krog (1767–1825), Norwegian civil servant and politician
- Wilhelm Kroll (1869–1939), German classicist
- Wilhelm von Krosigk (1871–1953), German Naval commander
- Wilhelm Traugott Krug (1770–1842), German philosopher and writer
- Wilhelm Kühne (1837–1900), German physiologist
- Wilhelm Kühne (aviator) (1888–1918), German flying ace
- Wilhelm Kunst (actor) (1799–1859), German actor
- Wilhelm Kunst (sculptor) (1909–1986), German sculptor
- Wilhelm Ritter von Leeb (1876–1956), German field marshal
- Wilhelm Legler (1875–1951), Austrian painter
- Wilhelm Lehmann (1882–1968), German teacher and writer
- Wilhelm Lippa (1923–1970), Austrian diver
- Wilhelm List (1880–1971), German field marshal
- Wilhelm Litten (1880–1932), German diplomat, writer
- Wilhelm Ljunggren (1905–1973), Norwegian mathematician
- Wilhelm Loeper (footballer) (born 1998), Swedish footballer
- Wilhelm Loewe (1814–1886), German politician
- Wilhelm Loewenthal (1850–1894), German-French physician
- Wilhelm Löffler (fencer) (born 1886), German fencer
- Wilhelm Löffler (medical doctor) (1887–1972), Swiss physician
- Wilhelm Gotthelf Lohrmann (1796–1840), Saxon cartographer, astronomer, and meteorologist
- Wilhelm Maybach (1846–1929), German engine designer and industrialist
- Wilhelm Mayer-Gross (1889–1961), German-British professor and psychiatrist
- Wilhelm Mayer (composer) (1831–1898), Austrian composer
- Wilhelm Mayer (fighter pilot) (1917–1945), German military aviator
- Wilhelm Meendsen-Bohlken (1897–1985), German Kriegsmarine vice admiral
- Wilhelm Ralph Merton (1848–1916), German businessman
- Wilhelm Meyer-Förster (1862–1934), German novelist and playwright
- Wilhelm Meyer-Lübke (1861–1936), Swiss linguist
- Wilhelm Meyer (engraver) (1844–1944), Swedish artist and xylographer
- Wilhelm Meyer (philologist) (1845-1917), German classical scholar
- Wilhelm Meyer (physician) (1824–1895), Danish physician
- Wilhelm Franz Meyer (1856–1934), German mathematician
- Wilhelm Mohnke (1911–2001), German SS commander
- Wilhelm Mohr (aviator) (1917–2016), Norwegian aviator and officer
- Wilhelm Mohr (journalist) (1838–1888), German journalist and author
- Wilhelm Mohr (politician) (1886–1978), Norwegian politician
- Wilhelm Molitor (1819–1880), German poet, priest, and jurist
- Wilhelm Mülhens (1762-1841), German perfumer
- Wilhelm Müller-Hofmann (1885–1948), Austrian painter
- Wilhelm Müller-Wismar (1881–1916), German ethnographer
- Wilhelm Müller (1794–1827), German poet
- Wilhelm Müller (handballer) (1909-1984), German handball player
- Wilhelm Müller (physicist) (1880–1968), German mathematician and physicist
- Wilhelm Konrad Hermann Müller (1812–1890), German philologist
- Wilhelm Nicolaysen (1869–1944), Norwegian barrister and businessperson
- Wilhelm Nielsen (Norwegian footballer) (1901-1960), Norwegian footballer
- Wilhelm Nielsen (politician) (1816–1889), Norwegian politician
- Wilhelm Nienstädt (1784–1862), Prussian playwright
- Wilhelm Niklas (1887–1957), German politician
- Wilhelm Theodor Nocken (1830–1905), German landscape painter
- Wilhelm August von der Osten (1697–1764), Danish civil servant
- Wilhelm Ostwald (1853–1932), German chemist and philosopher
- Wilhelm Ott (1886–1969), German mayor
- Wilhelm Oxenius (1912–1979), German Wehrmacht officer during WW II
- Wilhelm Peters (1815–1883), German naturalist and explorer
- Wilhelm Peters (painter) (1851–1935), Norwegian painter
- Wilhelm Petersen (composer) (1890–1957), German composer and conductor
- Wilhelm Petersen (entomologist) (1854–1933), Estonian entomologist
- Wilhelm Petersén (ice hockey) (1906–1988), Swedish ice hockey and bandy player
- Wilhelm Peterson-Berger (1867–1942), Swedish composer and music critic
- Wilhelm Reich (1897–1957), Austrian psychoanalyst
- Wilhelm Reichert (b. 1896. d. unknown), German rower
- Wilhelm Rein (1847–1929), German educational theorist
- Wilhelm Rein (cricketer) (1911–1994), South African cricketer
- Wilhelm Reinhard (pilot) (1891–1918), German pilot during World War I
- Wilhelm Reinhard (SS officer) (1869–1955), German general and Nazi
- Wilhelm Friedrich Riem (1779–1857), German composer and conductor
- Wilhelm Rietschel (1911–1941), German sculptor
- Wilhelm Rietze (1903–1944), German communist and resistance fighter against Nazism
- Wilhelm Rønning (1895–1983), Norwegian footballer
- Wilhelm Röntgen (1845–1923), German physicist
- Wilhelm Roos (1858–1944), Finnish politician
- Wilhelm Röpke (1899–1966), German economist
- Wilhelm Carl von Rothschild (1828–1901), German banker
- Wilhelm Röttger (1894–1946), German executioner
- Wilhelm Roux (1850–1924), German zoologist
- Wilhelm le Roux (born 1939), South African politician
- Wilhelm Ruhland (1878–1960), German botanist
- Wilhelm von Rümann (1850–1906), German sculptor
- Wilhelm Runge (1895–1987), German electrical engineer and physicist
- Wilhelm Ruppert (1905–1946), German SS officer
- Wilhelm Rust (1822–1892), German musicologist and composer
- Wilhelm Karl Rust (1787–1855), German pianist
- Wilhelm Rüstow (1821–1878), Prussian-born Swiss soldier and military writer
- Wilhelm Schäfer (1868–1952), German writer
- Wilhelm Schäfer (SS) (1911–1961), German SS war criminal
- Wilhelm Schaffrath (1814–1893), German jurist and politician
- Wilhelm Schallmayer (1857–1919), German physician
- Wilhelm Schauman (1857–1911), Finnish businessman
- Wilhelm Schauman (golfer) (born 1979), Swedish professional golfer
- Wilhelm Schirmer (1802–1866), German landscape painter
- Wilhelm Schitli (1912–2000), German SS officer
- Wilhelm Schlag (born 1969), Austrian American mathematician
- Wilhelm Tranow (born 1891), German cryptanalyst
- Wilhelm Trapp (1889–1948), Nazi war criminal
- Wilhelm Traub (1910–1946), German Nazi SS-Obersturmbannführer
- Wilhelm Traube (1866–1942), German chemist
- Wilhelm von Urach (1897–1957), German mechanical engineer
- Wilhelm von Urenbach, Grand Master of the Teutonic Knights
- Wilhelm Utermann (1912–1991), German writer and film producer
- Wilhelm Vigier (1823–1886), Swiss politician
- Wilhelm Vischer (philologist) (1808–1874), Swiss classical philologist
- Wilhelm Vischer (historian) (1833–1886), Swiss historian
- Wilhelm Vischer (jurist) (1861–1928), Swiss lawyer and politician
- Wilhelm Vischer (botanist) (1890–1960), Swiss botanist
- Wilhelm Vischer (theologian) (1895–1988), Swiss theologian
- Wilhelm Vöge (1868-1952), German art historian
- Wilhelm Richard Wagner (1813–1883), German composer
- Wilhelm Wattenbach (1819–1897), German paleographer
- Wilhelm Weber (gymnast) (1880–1963), German gymnast
- Wilhelm Weber (SS officer) (1918–1980), German officer and Knight's Cross recipient
- Wilhelm Eduard Weber (1804–1891), German physicist
- Wilhelm Weismann (1900–1980), German composer and musicologist
- Wilhelm Weiss (1892–1950), German journalist and Nazi propagandist
- Wilhelm Weiss (mathematician) (1859–1904), Austro-Hungarian mathematician
- Wilhelm Weistand (born 1945), Polish hurdler
- Wilhelm Weith (1846–1881), German-Swiss chemist
- Wilhelm Weitling (1808–1871), German tailor, inventor, and political activist
- Wilhelm Wiegand (1851–1915), German archivist and historian
- Wilhelm Wien (1864–1928), German physicist
- Wilhelm Friedrich Wieprecht (1802–1872), German conductor
- Wilhelm Wiesberg (1850–1896), Austrian writer and folksinger
- Wilhelm Eduard Wilda (1800–1856), German jurist
- Wilhelm Wilhelmsen (1839–1910), Norwegian shipping magnate
- Wilhelm Wilhelmsen (ship owner, b. 1872), Norwegian ship owner and yacht racer
- Wilhelm Willinger (1879–1943), Austro-Hungarian photographer
- Wilhelm Worringer (1881–1965), German art historian
- Wilhelm Woutersz (1939–2003), Sri Lankan diplomat and civil servant
- Wilhelm von Wrangell (1894–1976), Estonian politician
- Wilhelm von Wright (1810–1887), Finnish painter
- Wilhelm Wundt (1832–1920), German founder of psychology
- Wilhelm Würfel (1790–1832), Czech conductor, composer and pianist
- Wilhelm Xylander (1532–1576), German humanist and classical scholar
- Wilhelm Zahn (1910–1976), German navy officer
- Wilhelm Johann Karl Zahn (1800–1871), German artist
- Wilhelm Zaisser (1893–1958), German politician
- Wilhelm Zander (1911–1974), German SS officer
- Wilhelm Zangen (1891–1971), German industrialist and supporter of the Nazi Party
- Wilhelm Zenger (1877–1911), German figure skater
- Wilhelm Ziehr (born 1938), German writer
- Wilhelm Zimmermann (1807–1878), German theologian and historian
- Wilhelm Zoepf (1908–1980), SS Sturmbannführer and figure in the Holocaust

== Fictional characters with the given name ==
- Wilhelm van Astrea, a character in the light novel series Re:Zero − Starting Life in Another World
- Wilhelm (Xenosaga), a character in Xenosaga video games
- Wilhelm Ryan, Supreme Trimage in The Amory Wars

== People with the surname ==
- Anette Wilhelm (born 1972), Swedish wheelchair curler
- Bill Wilhelm (1929–2010), American college baseball coach
- Bruce Wilhelm (born 1945), American weightlifter
- Carl Wilhelm (1885–1936), German film director
- C. Wilhelm (1858–1925), British costume designer
- Eugène Wilhelm (1866–1951), French lawyer and sexologist
- George Wilhelm (1829–1920), American Medal of Honor recipient
- George W. Wilhelm (1847–1902), American politician from Ohio
- Hellmut Wilhelm (1905–1990), German Sinologist
- Hoyt Wilhelm (1923–2002), American major league baseball pitcher
- Karl Wilhelm (disambiguation), multiple people
- Kate Wilhelm (1928–2018), American writer
- Kati Wilhelm (born 1976), German biathlete
- Manuel Wilhelm, German rugby union player
- Mary Jo Wilhelm, American politician
- Matthew Wilhelm, American politician
- Richard Wilhelm (disambiguation), multiple people
- Stephen Wilhelm (1919–2002), American phytopathologist
- Thomas Wilhelm (born 1971), Swedish curler and curling coach
- Warren Wilhelm, birth name of Bill de Blasio (born 1961), American politician and former mayor of New York

== Fictional characters with the surname ==
- Mr. Wilhelm, a recurring minor character in Seinfeld
- Reinhardt (Overwatch), a tank hero in the 2016 video game Overwatch

== See also ==
- Wilhelm (disambiguation)
- Wilhelm, Wilhelms, Wilhelmsen, Wilhelmson, Wilhelmsson
- Willem, Willems, Willemse, Willemsen, Willemsens, Willemszoon
- William, Williams (list), Williamson, Wilson (list), Willson, Willyams
