= Wilhelm Hansen =

Wilhelm Hansen may refer to:

- Wilhelm Hansen (politician), Norwegian politician
- Wilhelm Hansen (publisher), Danish printer and engraver, founder of the Edition Wilhelm Hansen music publishing house
- Wilhelm Hansen (art collector), Danish businessman and art collector, founder of the Ordrupgaard Museum in Copenhagen
- Wilhelm Hansen (rower)
- Wilhelm Hansen (footballer)
