= Wilusz =

Wilusz is a Polish surname, a form of Wilhelm. Notable people with the surname include:

- Jeffrey Wilusz, American microbiologist
- Maciej Wilusz (born 1988), Polish footballer
