= Roettger =

Surname

Roettger or Röttger is a surname. Notable people with the surname include:

- Norman Charles Roettger, Jr. (1930–2003), American lawyer and judge
- Oscar Roettger (1900–1986), American first baseman and right-handed pitcher
- Timo Röttger (born 1985), German footballer
- Wally Roettger (1902–1951), professional baseball player
- Wilhelm Röttger (1894–1946), German executioner
- William Röttger (1948–2015), German label manager, music manager and gallery owner
- Wolfgang Röttger, German politician (German Christian Democratic Union)
