= Vilho =

Vilho is a given name, the Finnish form of Wilhelm or William. Notable people with the name include:

- Vilho Annala (1888–1960), Finnish politician
- Vilho Askola (1906–1994), Finnish printmaker
- Vilho Auvinen (1907–1946), Finnish actor
- Vilho Cornér (1868–1946), Finnish jurist, bank director and politician
- Vilho Harle (born 1947), Finnish professor
- Vilho Helanen (1899–1956), Finnish civil servant and politician
- Henrik Hietakari (1894–1946), Finnish long-distance runner
- Vilho Hirvensalo (1881–1937), Finnish agronomist, farmer and politician
- Vilho Huovila (born 2006), Finnish footballer
- Vilho Ihemba (born 1969), Namibian politician
- Vilho Kivioja (1896–1977), Finnish politician and cleric
- Vilho Koljonen (1910–2000), Finnish writer
- Vilho Lampi (1898–1936), Finnish painter
- Vilho Lehokas (1876–1918), Finnish politician
- Vilho Luolajan-Mikkola (1911–2005), Finnish composer
- Vilho Petter Nenonen (1883–1960), Finnish general
- Vilho Niitemaa (1917–1991), Estonian-Finnish historian
- Vilho Niittymaa (1896–1979), Finnish track and field athlete
- Vilho Palosaari (born 2004), Finnish ski jumper
- Vilho Pekkala (1898–1974), Finnish wrestler
- Vilho Penttilä (1868–1918), Finnish architect
- Vilho Rättö (1913–2002), Finnish soldier
- Vilho Reima (1867–1948), Finnish schoolteacher and politician
- Vilho Rinne (1895–1980), Finnish javelin thrower
- Ville Ritola (1896–1982), Finnish long-distance runner
- Vilho Siivola (1910–1984), Finnish actor and director
- Vilho Sjöström (1873–1944), Finnish painter
- Vilho Suomi (1906–1979), Finnish literary scholar, journalist and professor
- Vilho Suosalo (1910–1976), Finnish politician
- Vilho Tervasmäki (1915–2010), Finnish soldier and historian
- Vilho Tilkanen (1885–1945), Finnish cyclist
- Vilho Turunen (1923–1973), Finnish trade union functionary and politician
- Vilho Tuulos (1895–1967), Finnish athletics elite competitor
- Vilho Väisälä (1889–1969), Finnish meteorologist and physicist
- Vilho Vauhkonen (1877–1957), Finnish sport shooter
- Vilho Väyrynen (1912–2000), Finnish lawyer and politician
- Vilho Ylönen (1918–2000), Finnish cross-country skier and rifle shooter

== Fictional characters ==
- Vilho Koskela, a character from The Unknown Soldier novel and Under the North Star trilogy by Väinö Linna
