= Ordrupgaard =

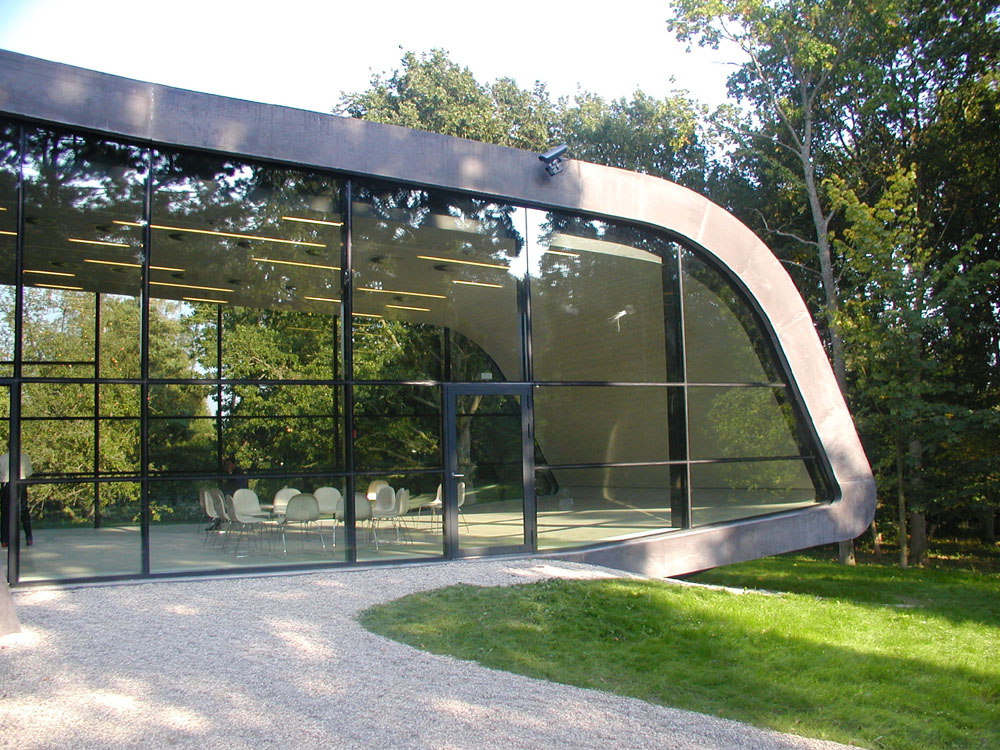
- Established: 1918
- Location: Copenhagen, Denmark
- Coordinates: 55.766944°N 12.563333°E
- Type: Art museum
- Website: ordrupgaard.dk/en

Ordrupgaard is a state-owned art museum situated near Jægersborg Dyrehave, north of Copenhagen, Denmark. The museum houses one of Northern Europe's most important collections of Danish and French art from the 19th and beginning of the 20th century.

== History ==
Ordrupgaard was originally a country home built between 1916 and 1918 by Wilhelm Hansen and his wife Henny Nathalie Soelberg Jensen (1870-1951). Wilhelm Peter Henning Hansen was the Danish general representative of the English-based Life Insurance company Gresham for two decades. In 1896, he founded the Danish-based life insurance company Dansk Folkeforsikringsanstalt. Later, he also founded the internationally oriented insurance company Mundus. In 1905, Danish insurance company Hafnia appointed to their managing director. He held the office until 1936.

Wilhelm and Henny Hansen bought a large piece of land by Ordrup Krat, near Jægersborg Dyrehave, north of Copenhagen, Denmark. Between 1916 and 1918 they built their stately home Ordrupgaard, designed by architect Gotfred Tvede (1863–1947). At the same time an extensive park was laid out by landscape gardener Valdemar Fabricius Hansen (1866–1953). Ordrupgaard was inaugurated on 14 September 1918. In his opening speech, Wilhelm Hansen declared that the collection would be left to the Danish State.

In 1922, Wilhelm Hansen suffered a massive financial and personal loss. "Landmandsbanken", in which the Consortium had taken loans for the purchase of art works, collapsed. In order to pay off his debt Wilhelm Hansen sold more than half of his French collection – approximately 82 pieces. Among these were important works by Paul Cézanne, Édouard Manet and Paul Gauguin. Many of these works are now housed at the "Ny Carlsberg Glyptotek" in Copenhagen and "The National Museum of Western Art" in Tokyo. Wilhelm Hansen overcame the crisis and from 1923 to 1933 compensated for his losses by buying new, specifically French paintings, which are still at Ordrupgaard.

After the death of Wilhelm Hansen in 1936, his widow Henny Hansen lived on alone at Ordrupgaard. At her death in 1951, she left the collection, the house and the park to the Danish State, as Wilhelm Hansen had wished. In 1953, Ordrupgaard was opened to the public as a state-owned art museum.

On 30 August 2005, Ordrupgaard inaugurated the new extension designed by the Iraqi-born architect Zaha Hadid (1950–2016). The extension measures 1,150 sq.m. and has improved the space, climate and security conditions so that Ordrupgaard is now able to present special exhibitions at an international level. The extension is constructed in glass and black lava concrete joined to form a deconstructivistic and organic body. A further, largely-underground, extension, designed by Snøhetta, was inaugurated on 13 August 2021.

== Collection ==
=== Danish arts collection ===
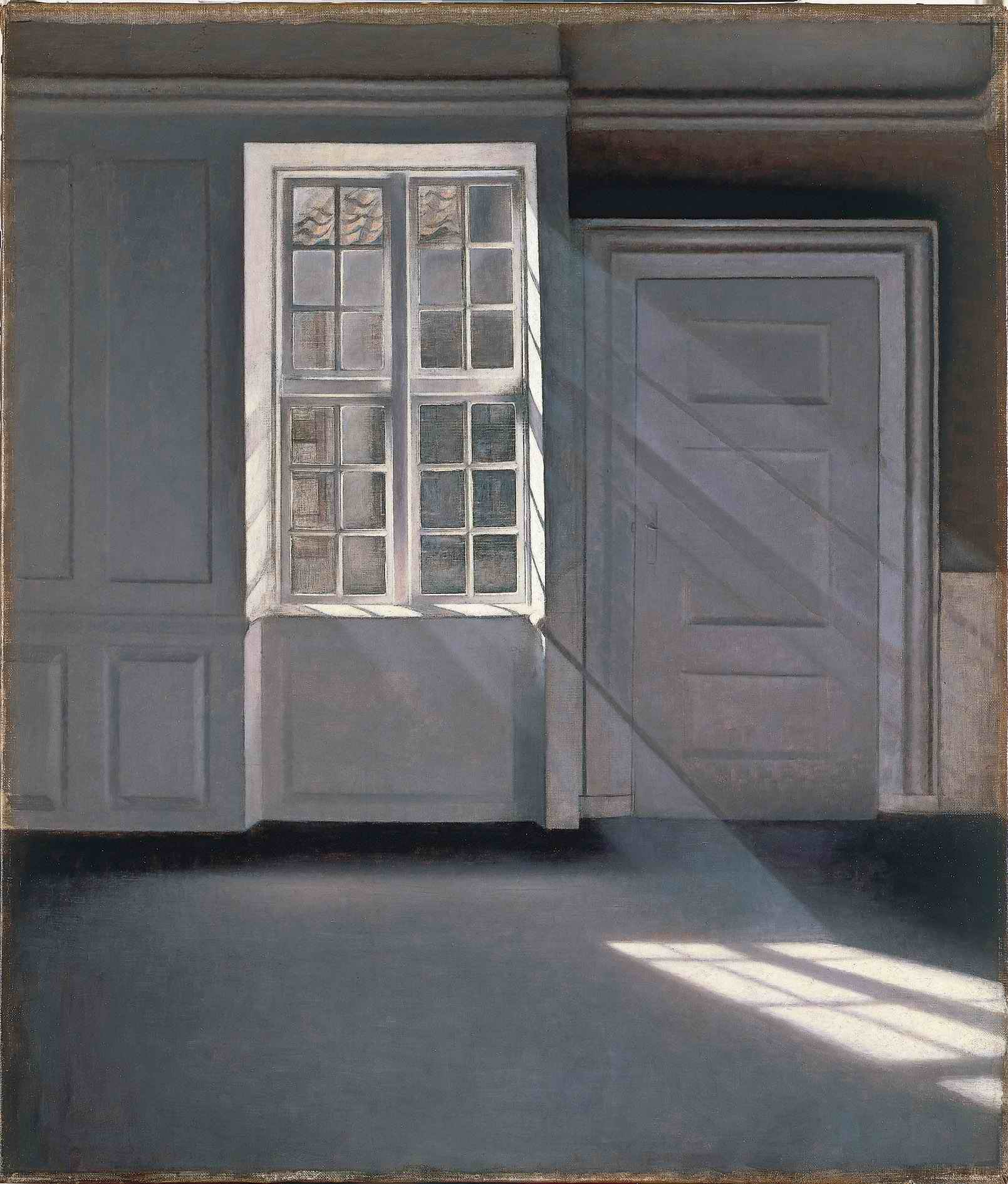
Støvkornenes dans i solstrålerne (Dust Motes Dancing in the Sunbeams) by Vilhelm Hammershøi (1900)

Wilhelm Hansen established his collection of Danish art covering the 19th to the beginning of the 20th century during the period of 1892 to 1916. The Danish Golden Age is comprehensively represented by works by, amongst others: Christoffer Wilhelm Eckersberg, Christen Købke, Johan Thomas Lundbye, P.C. Skovgaard and Wilhelm Marstrand. The main part of the collection, however, testifies to Wilhelm Hansen's interest for contemporary art with works by artists such as: L.A. Ring, Vilhelm Hammershøi and Theodor Philipsen, not forgetting the Fynbo Painters Johannes Larsen, Fritz Syberg and Peter Hansen, Wilhelm Hansen's childhood friend.

=== French fine arts collection ===
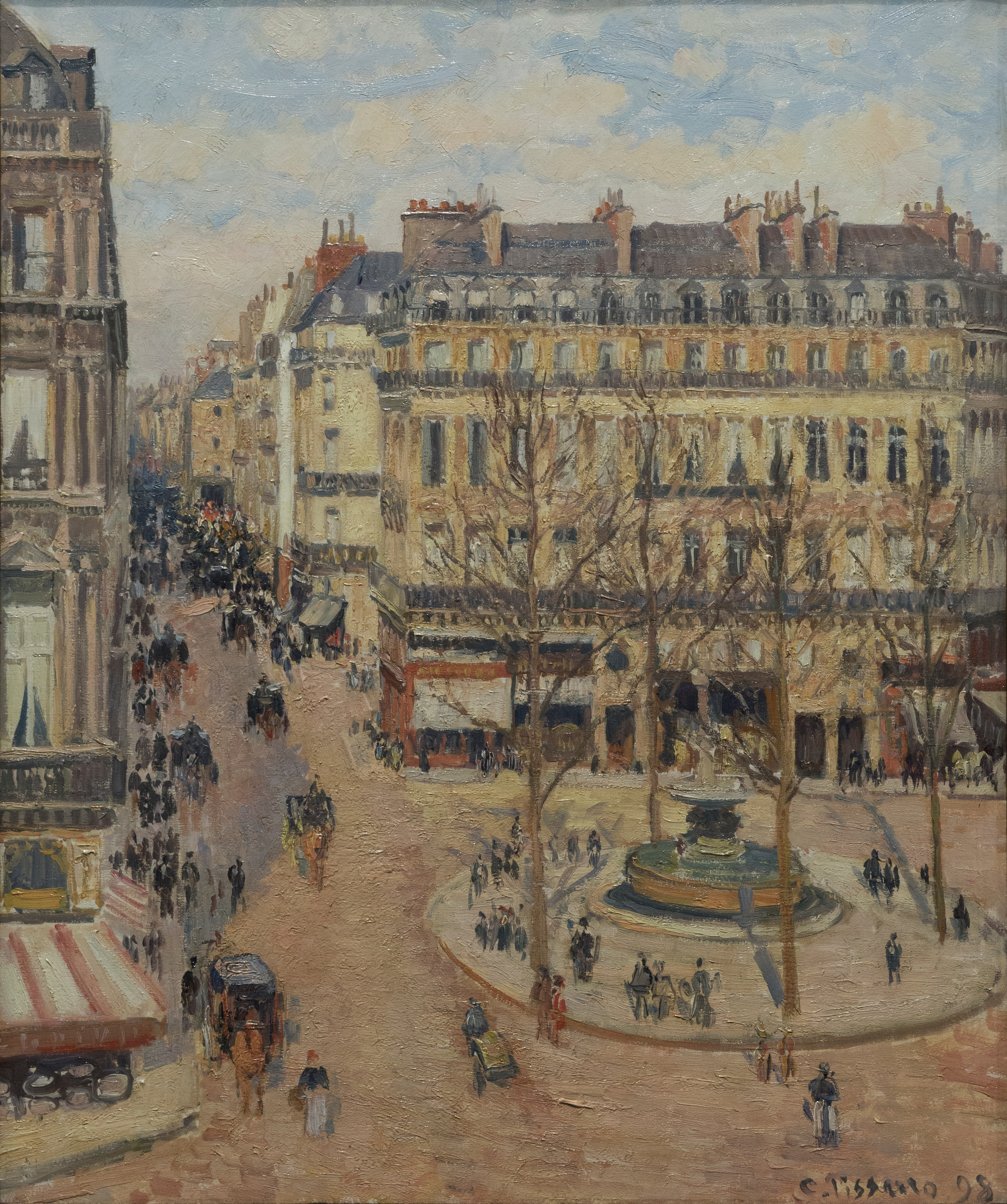
Camille Pissarro, La Rue Saint-Honoré, matin, effet de soleil

During World War I, Wilhelm Hansen focused his interest on French art. From 1916 to 1918 he purchased French paintings, pastels, drawings and sculptures, thus laying the foundation for an actual art museum. It was Wilhelm Hansen's great wish to acquaint the Danes with French 19th-century art. His first purchases were paintings by Alfred Sisley, Camille Pissarro, Claude Monet and Auguste Renoir. Wilhelm Hansen's main focus was on French Impressionism. In order, however, to put Impressionism into perspective, his collection also comprised the genres immediately preceding and following. Thus, Ordrupgaard is able to show Eugène Delacroix, representing Romanticism, Théodore Rousseau (the Barbizon School), Gustave Courbet (Realism), Édouard Manet (Modernism), and Paul Gauguin (Symbolism). When purchasing French art, Wilhelm Hansen often took advice from the French art critic Théodore Duret (1838–1927).

=== Furniture and handicrafts collection ===
Parallel to Wilhelm Hansen's interest in Danish and French art was his interest in furniture and handicrafts. He was especially interested in ceramics, chandeliers and furniture executed by architect, sculptor and ornamental artist Thorvald Bindesbøll (1846–1908).

== Buildings ==
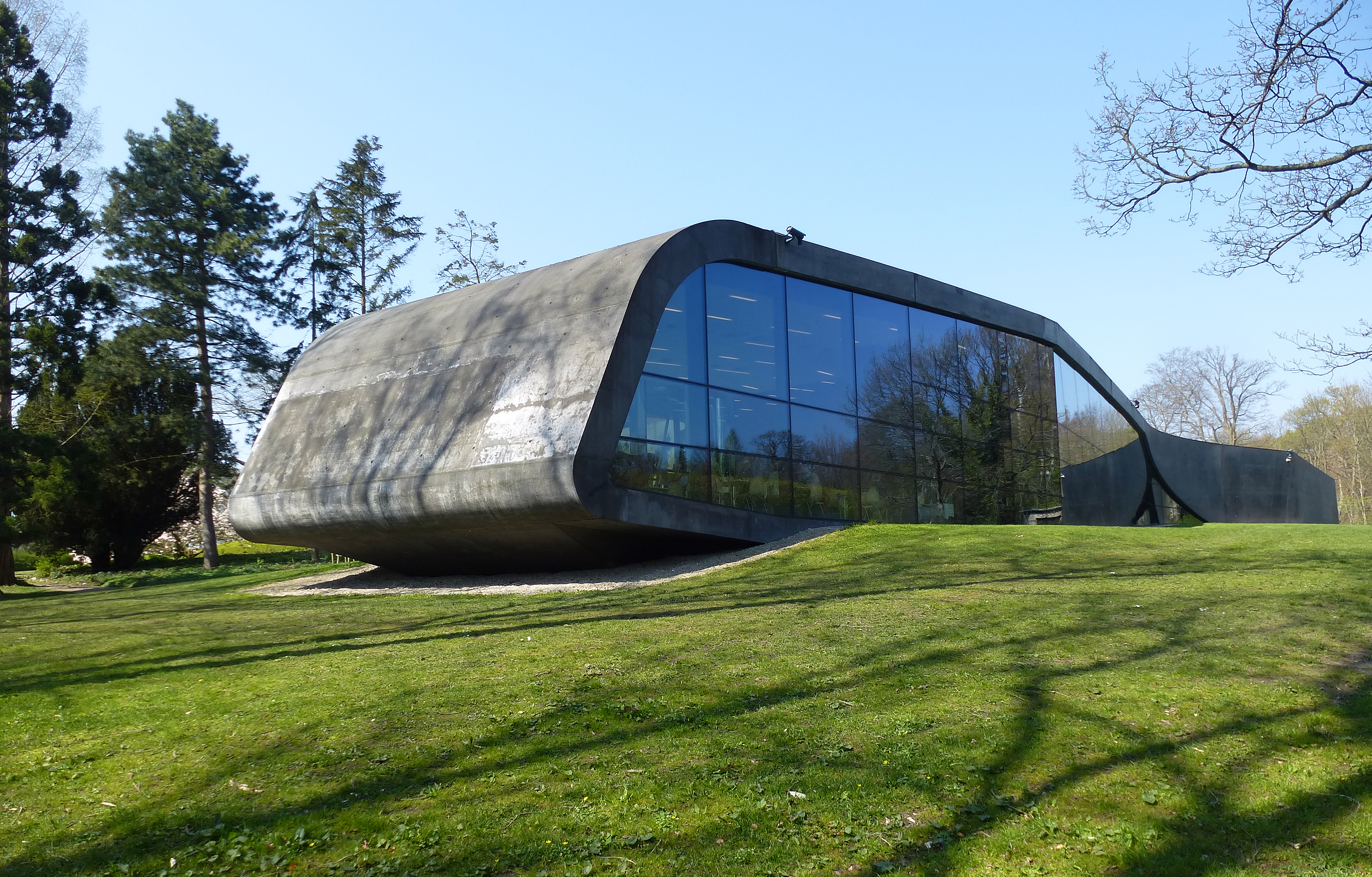
Ordrupgaard view from the park

Ordrupgaard was originally built as a three-winged trellised country mansion in the neo-classical style. The gallery which houses the French collection is connected to the main building by a small conservatory. Additionally, a porter's lodge, a driver's residence (now demolished) and a coach house (now named "Lavendelhuset"/ The Lavender House) were erected. A shed and a small half-timbered summerhouse comprise the rest of the original buildings on the estate.

== Park ==
The Park at Ordrupgaard is laid out in the English style with a smaller French-inspired rose garden, originally adorned by a ceramic fountain by Jean Gauguin (now placed in the conservatory due to conservational reasons). The Park at Ordrupgaard originally functioned as a kitchen garden as well as a flower garden. The extensive produce and the many fruit trees sustained the family with fresh fruit and vegetables throughout the year while the rest of the grounds were used for leisure and contemplation. From the summerhouse could be viewed, at the far end of the park (where now there is a meadow) a small lake encompassing an island complete with rowing boat. There were also small ponds around the grounds, which have since been filled in.

== Finn Juhl house ==
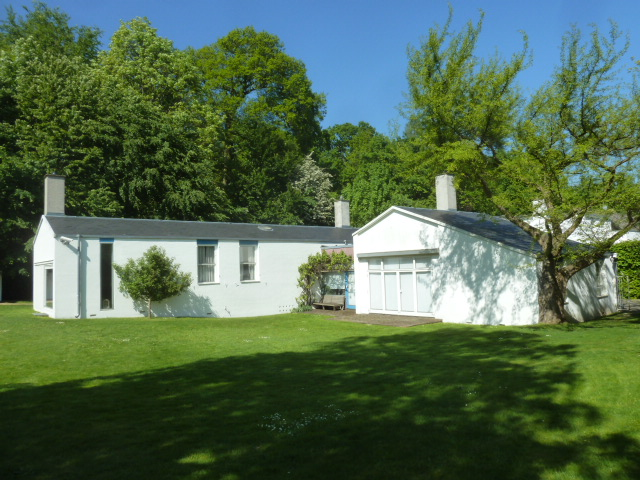
Finn Juhl house

From 1941 to 1942, furniture designer Finn Juhl (1912–1989) designed and furnished his own house next door to Ordrupgaard. The house is one of the first functionalistic one-family houses in Denmark. Here Finn Juhl lived until his death in 1989. Finn Juhl's widow Hanne Wilhelm Hansen left the house and its interior unchanged. On 3 April 2008, the house opened as a separate, additional part of Ordrupgaard Art Museum, thanks to a private donation from Birgit Lyngbye Pedersen.

== Other sources ==
- Wilhelm Hansen's letters and photos in Ordrupgaard's Archive
- Madsen, Karl: Malerisamlingen Ordrupgaard. Wilhelm Hansens Samling. Malerier, Akvareller, Pasteller, Tegninger af franske Kunstnere (København, 1918)
- Swane, Leo: Etatsråd Wilhelm Hansen og hustru Henny Hansens malerisamling, Katalog over kunstværkerne på Ordrupgaard (København, 1954)
- Rostrup, Haavard: Etatsraad Wilhelm Hansen og hustru Henny Hansens malerisamling. Catalogue of the Works of Art in The Ordrupgaard Collection (København, 1966)
- Asmussen, Marianne Wirenfeldt: Wilhelm Hansens oprindelige franske samling på Ordrupgaard. Wilhelm Hansen's Original French Collection at Ordrupgaard (København, 1993)

== Related reading ==
- Wivel, Mikael: Ordrupgaard, Selected works (Ordrupgaard. 1993) ISBN 87-88692-09-4
- Rostru, Haavard: Histoire du Musée d'Ordrupgaard, 1918–1978: D'aprés des documents inédits (Gyldendal. 1981) ISBN 87-981162-0-7
- Lederballe, Thomas and Rabinow, Rebecca (ed.): The Age of Impressionism. European Paintings from Ordrupgaard (Ordrupgaard. 2002) ISBN 87-88692-27-2
- Anderberg, Birgitte & Thomas Lederballe (ed.): Ordrupgaard: Danish Art from the Century of the Golden Age (Copenhagen, 1999) ISBN 978-8788692204
