= Vilhelm =

Vilhelm is a masculine given name, the Scandinavian form of William and Wilhelm. Notable people with the name include:

- Vilhelm Ahlmann (1852–1928), Danish-Swedish architect
- Vilhelm Andersen (1864–1953), Danish author, literary historian and intellectual
- Vilhelm Andersson (1891–1933), Swedish water polo player and freestyle swimmer
- Vilhelm Assarsson (1889–1974), Swedish diplomat
- Vilhelm Aubert (1922–1988), Norwegian sociologist
- Vilhelm Mariboe Aubert (1868–1908), Norwegian jurist
- Vilhelm Bergsøe (1835–1911), Danish author and scientist
- Vilhelm Blomgren (Born 1991), Swedish actor & musician
- Vilhelm Bjerke-Petersen (1909–1957), Danish painter, writer and art theorist
- Vilhelm Bjerknes (1862–1951), Norwegian physicist, founder of modern meteorology
- Vilhelm Bissen (1836–1913), Danish sculptor
- Vilhelm Frimann Christie Bøgh (1817–1888), Norwegian archivist
- Vilhelm Bryde (1888–1974), Swedish actor and art director
- Vilhelm Buhl (1881–1954), Prime Minister of Denmark in 1942 and again in 1945
- Vilhelm Carlberg (1880–1970), Swedish Olympic champion shooter
- Vilhelm Dahlerup (1826–1907), Danish architect
- Vilhelm Dybwad (1863–1950), Norwegian barrister and writer
- Vilhelm Ekelund (1880–1949), Swedish poet
- Vilhelm Evang (1909–1983), Norwegian military officer
- Vilhelm Grønbech (1873–1948), Danish cultural historian and educator
- Vilhelm Groth (1842–1899), Danish landscape painter
- Vilhelm Gylche (1888–1952), Danish track and field athlete
- Vilhelm Hammershøi (1864–1916), Danish painter
- Vilhelm Hansen (1900–1992), Danish children's book author and illustrator
- Vilhelm Helander (1941–2025), Finnish architect
- Vilhelm Herold (1865–1937), Danish operatic tenor, voice teacher and theatre director
- Vilhelm Christian Holm (1820–1886), Danish composer
- Vilhelm Hvalsøe (1883–1958), Danish architect
- Johannes Vilhelm Jensen (1873–1950), Danish writer, Nobel Prize laureate
- Vilhelm Johansen (1898–1993), Danish sports shooter
- Vilhelm Jørgensen (1897–1967), Danish footballer
- Vilhelm Kiviniemi (1877–1951), Finnish politician
- Vilhelm Klavenæs (19??–19??), Norwegian luger
- Vilhelm Klein (1835–1913), Danish architect
- Vilhelm Krag (1871–1933), Norwegian poet, author, journalist and cultural personality
- Vilhelm Kraus (1949–2020), Bulgarian politician
- Vilhelm Kyhn (1819–1903), Danish landscape painter
- Vilhelm Lange (1893–1950), Danish gymnast
- Vilhelm Lauritzen (1894–1984), Danish architect
- Vilhelm Laybourn (1885–1955), Danish modern pentathlete
- Vilhelm Lie (1877–1935), Norwegian civil servant
- Vilhelm Lindgrén (1895–1960), Finnish swimmer
- Anders Vilhelm Lundstedt (1882–1955), Swedish jurist and legislator
- Vilhelm Lundstrøm (1893–1950), Danish modernist painter
- Vilhelm Herman Oluf Madsen (1844–1917), Danish politician, minister, army officer, businessman and inventor
- Vilhelm Mejdell (1904–1989), Norwegian marketing agent and sports official
- Vilhelm Melbye (1824–1882), Danish painter
- Vilhelm Moberg (1898–1973), Swedish author, playwright and historian
- Vilhelm Munk Nielsen (born 1955), Danish footballer
- Vilhelm Pacht (1843–1912), Danish genre painter, industrialist and philanthropist
- Vilhelm Paus (1915–1995), Norwegian lawyer, diplomat and business executive
- Vilhelm Pedersen (1820–1859), Danish painter and illustrator
- Vilhelm Petersen (1812–1880), Danish landscape painter
- Vilhelm Petersen (1830–1913), Danish architect
- Vilhelm Rosenqvist (1856–1925), Finnish secondary school teacher and politician
- Vilhelm Rosenstand (1838–1915), Danish painter and illustrator
- Vilhelm Mathias Skeel (1746–1817), Danish landowner, county official and military officer
- Vilhelm Swedenborg (1869–1943), Swedish military officer, explorer and an aeronaut
- Vilhelm Thomsen (1842–1927), Danish linguist and Turkologist
- Vilhelm Topsøe (1840–1881), Danish novelist and journalist
- Vilhelm Tvede (1826–1891), Danish architect
- Vilhelm Tveteraas (1898–1972), Norwegian printmaker, painter and illustrator
- Vilhelm Uchermann (1852–1929), Norwegian physician, otorhinolaryngologist
- Vilhelm Vett (1879–1962), Danish sport sailor
- Vilhelm Theodor Walther (1819–1892), Danish architect
- Vilhelm Andreas Wexelsen (1849–1909), Norwegian bishop and politician
- Vilhelm Wohlert (1920–2007), was a Danish architect
- Vilhelm Wolfhagen (1889–1958), Danish amateur football player

== See also ==
- Guilherme, Portuguese
- Villem, Estonian
- Wilhelm, German
- Willem, Dutch
- William (name), English
