= Wilhelm (disambiguation) =

Wilhelm is a German name.

Wilhelm may also refer to:

== People ==
- C. Wilhelm, costume designer known professionally as "Wilhelm"

== Other uses ==
- Mount Wilhelm, the highest mountain in Papua New Guinea
- Wilhelm Archipelago, Antarctica
- Wilhelm (crater), a lunar crater
- Wilhelm scream, stock sound effect used in many movies and shows

== See also ==
- Wilhelm scream, a stock sound effect
- SS Kaiser Wilhelm II, or USS Agamemnon, a German steam ship
- Wilhelmus, the Dutch national anthem
- William Helm (1837–1919), American pioneer
- William Henry Helm (1860–1936), English writer
