= Richard Wilhelm =

Richard Wilhelm may refer to:

- Richard Wilhelm (sinologist) (1873–1930), German sinologist, theologian, and missionary
- Richard Wilhelm (athlete) (1887–1917), German track and field athlete
- Richard H. Wilhelm (1909–1968), American chemical engineer
