= Jeffrey Wilusz =

American microbiologist

Jeffrey Wilusz is an American microbiologist currently at Colorado State University, Editor-in-Chief of Wiley's Wiley Interdisciplinary Reviews and an Elected Fellow of the American Association for the Advancement of Science. His published research includes mRNA metabolism's regulation on mammalian cells, affects by Dengue and rabies and the relationship between RNAi, viral infections and nanoparticulate matter deposition. Published paper highs are 936, 388 and 318.
