= Karl Wilhelm =

Karl Wilhelm may refer to: KW or karl

- Karl Wilhelm (botanist) (K.Wilh., 1848–1933), German botanist
- Karl Wilhelm (conductor) (1815–1873), German choral director
- Karl Wilhelm, Duke of Saxe-Meiningen (1754–1782)

== See also ==
- Carl Wilhelm (1885–1936), German film director, film producer and screenwriter of the silent film era
- Carl Wilhelm Tetting (1896–1966) German actor and film producer
- Charles William Ferdinand, Duke of Brunswick (1735–1806), Karl Wilhelm Ferdinand in German
