= Wilhelm Johann Karl Zahn =

German artist (1800–1871)

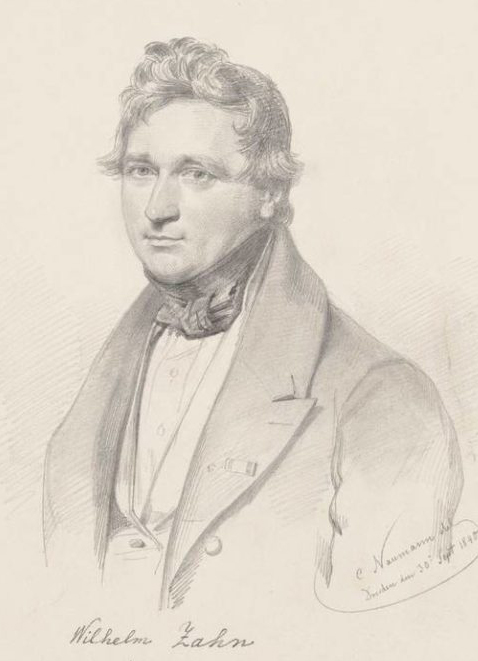
- Wilhelm Zahn, by C. Newmann, 1848
- Born: 21 August 1800; Rodenberg, Germany
- Died: 22 August 1871 (aged 71); Berlin, Germany
- Occupations: Painter, Architect, Illustrator, inventor
- Notable work: The Most Beautiful Ornaments and the Most Notable Pictures from Pompeii, Herculaneum and Stabiæ (1828–30)

Wilhelm Johann Karl Zahn (21 August 1800 – 22 August 1871) was a German architect, painter, art critic and design researcher particularly of Roman interior designs found in the ruins of Pompeii. Wilhelm was born in Rodenberg, Schaumburg, as the fourth of five children of painter Bernhard Zahn, and his wife, Christiane, née Weis according to church records. He attended high schools in Bückeburg and Rinteln where he received a universal education. It was in Rinteln where Zahn studied the classics under a Professor Stein who Zahn remembered with particular affection.

== Professional development ==
Zahn received lessons in architecture and painting from Andreas Range and Sebastian Weygandt, a portrait painter, in Kassel, Germany. He also studied under German neoclassical architect and garden designer, Heinrich Christoph Jussow. Around 1823/24, while he was in Paris with his brother Georg and Johann Wilhelm Nahl, he attended the studios of Jean-Victor Bertin, a French landscape painter, and Antoine-Jean Gros, a French neoclassical artist known for his historical paintings completed under the patronage of Napoleon Bonaparte.

Following Zahn's stay in Paris, beginning in 1824, he spent three years in Italy, particularly in Pompeii, where he made numerous tracings of wall frescoes in the ruins and in the Museo Borbonico (now the National Archaeological Museum, Naples). He superintended excavations at Herculaneum and Pompeii; cast the finest bronzes and silver vases for the Museum Borbonico; After Zahn's return from Italy in 1827, he met celebrated poet and naturalist Johann Wolfgang von Goethe. Together with the Grand Duke of Weimar, Goethe introduced Zahn to then Crown Prince, later King Friedrich Wilhelm IV, the Humboldt brothers, Prince Wittgenstein, Schinkel and the sculptor Rauch, as well as other art lovers who promoted the publication of Zahn's drawings from Pompeii. In 1829, Zahn became professor in the Prussian Academy of Arts in Berlin. As an architect and interior designer, he decorated many fine houses and villas in the Pompeiian style in England and the United States.

== Death ==
Zahn died in Berlin in 1871.

== Works ==
Zahn's portfolio The most beautiful ornaments and strangest paintings from Pompeii, Herculanum and Stabiae was published by Verlag Reimer between 1828 and 1830 with 100 plates, many of them printed in color using an improved process in color lithography Zahn invented in 1818. He later continued the successful publication with two more volumes of the same size. In addition, he brought out epoch-spanning model works with ornaments. The focus of his research interest was to obtain templates for arts and crafts. However, with increasing scientific research into antiquity and other art epochs, less importance was attached to his publications.

- The Most Beautiful Ornaments and the Most Notable Pictures from Pompeii, Herculaneum and Stabiæ (1828–30)
- Ornaments of All Classical Periods of Art based on the originals in their peculiar colors (1832–48) Reimer, Berlin, 20 volumes with 100 plates.
- The most beautiful ornaments and curious paintings from Pompeii, Herculanum and Stabiae, from the original drawings made on the spot 2nd episode. Reimer, Berlin (1842–1844).
- The most beautiful ornaments and most remarkable paintings from Pompeii, Herculanum and Stabiae from the original drawings made on the spot 3rd episode. Reimer, Berlin (1852-1859)
- Exquisite ornaments from the entire field of fine arts Reimer, Berlin (1842-1844); 5 volumes with 25 plates.
  - 2nd edition 1853
  - 3rd edition 1870 (Internet Archive)

=== Sampling of reproductions of Frescos and Mosaics from Pompeii and Herculaneum by Wilhelm Zahn ===
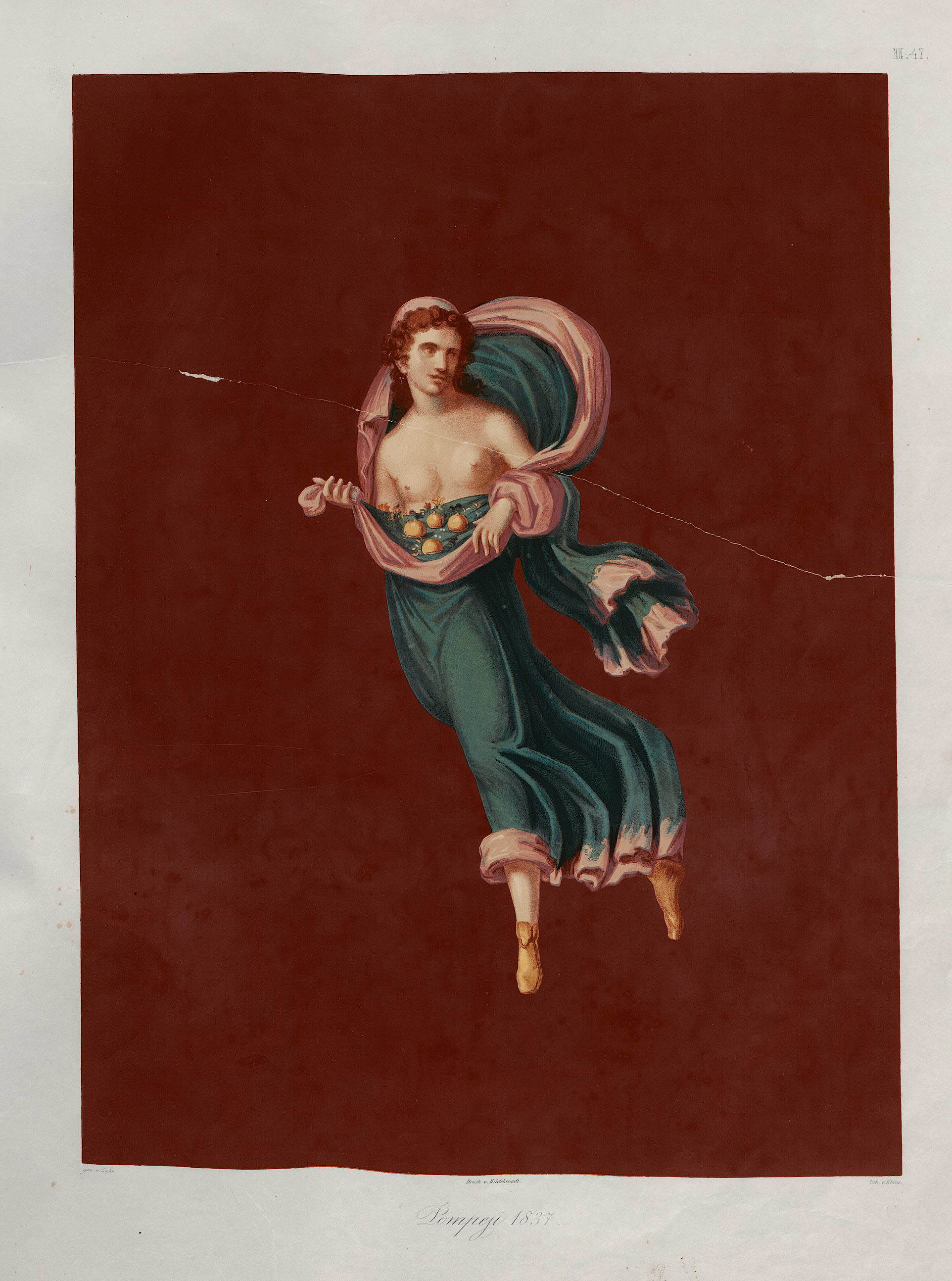
Floating mythological figure from Pompeii

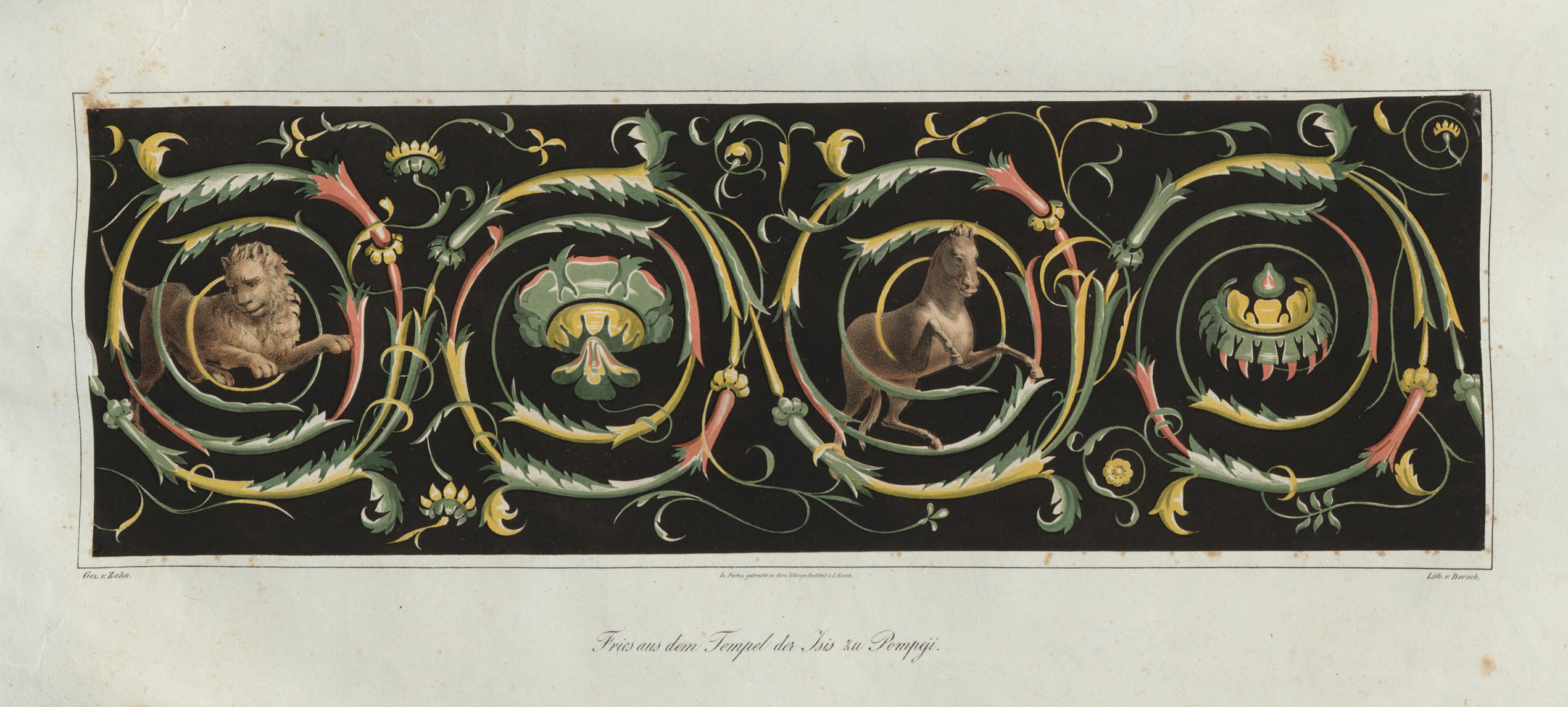
Frieze from the Temple of Isis in Pompeii

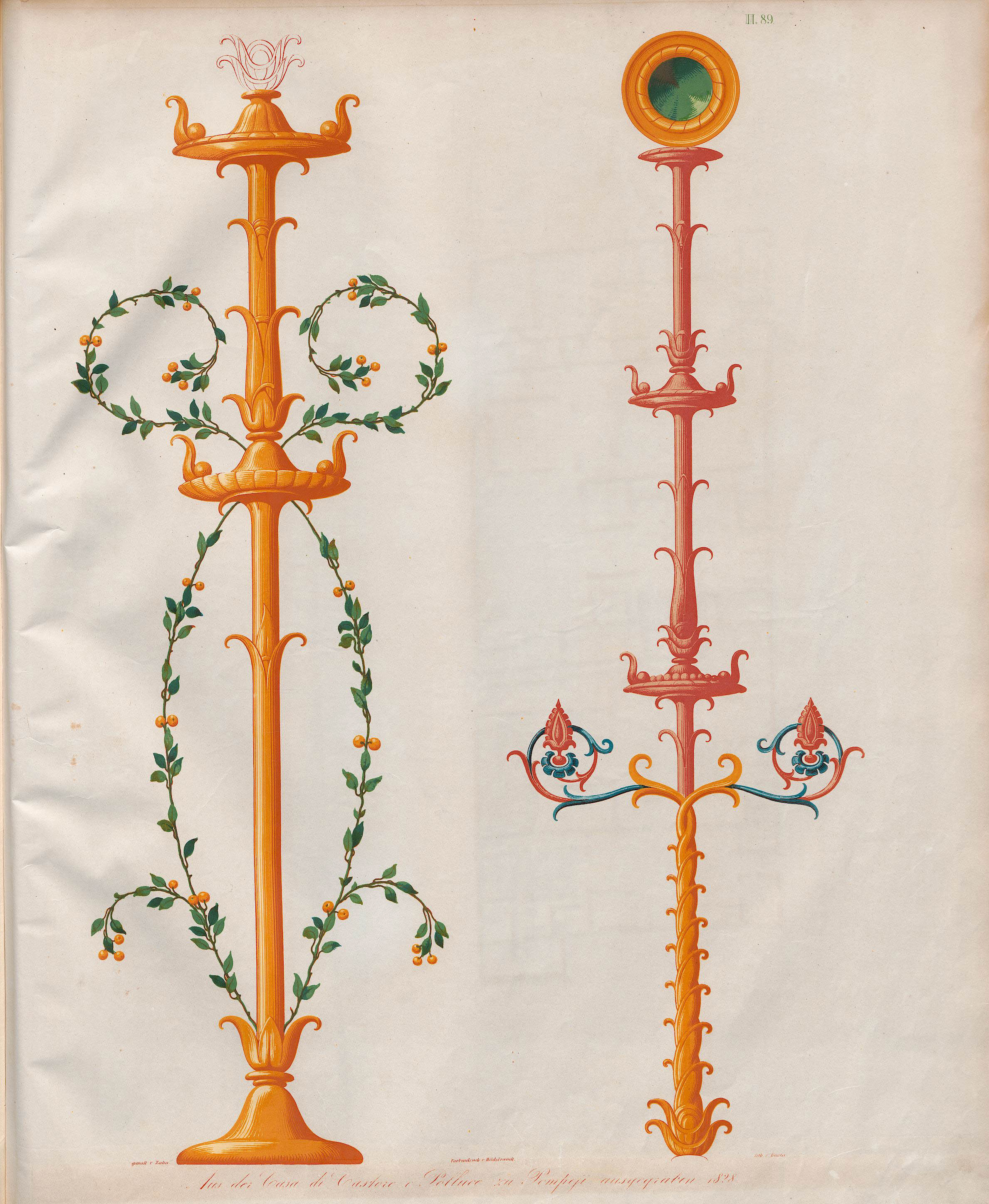
Designs from the walls of the House of the Dioscuri aka House of Castor and Pollux

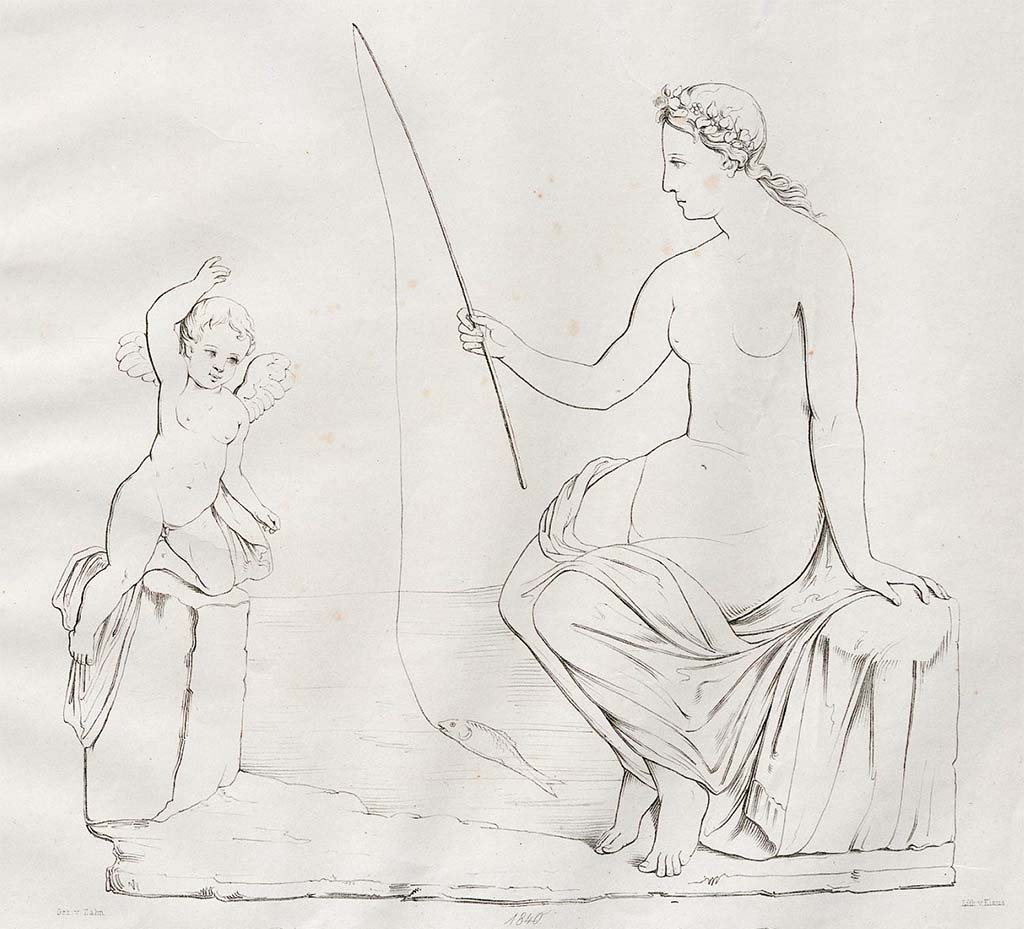
Drawing of Venus Pescatrice (fisherwoman) from the Casa della Pescatrice VII 9 63,60 Pompeii.jpg

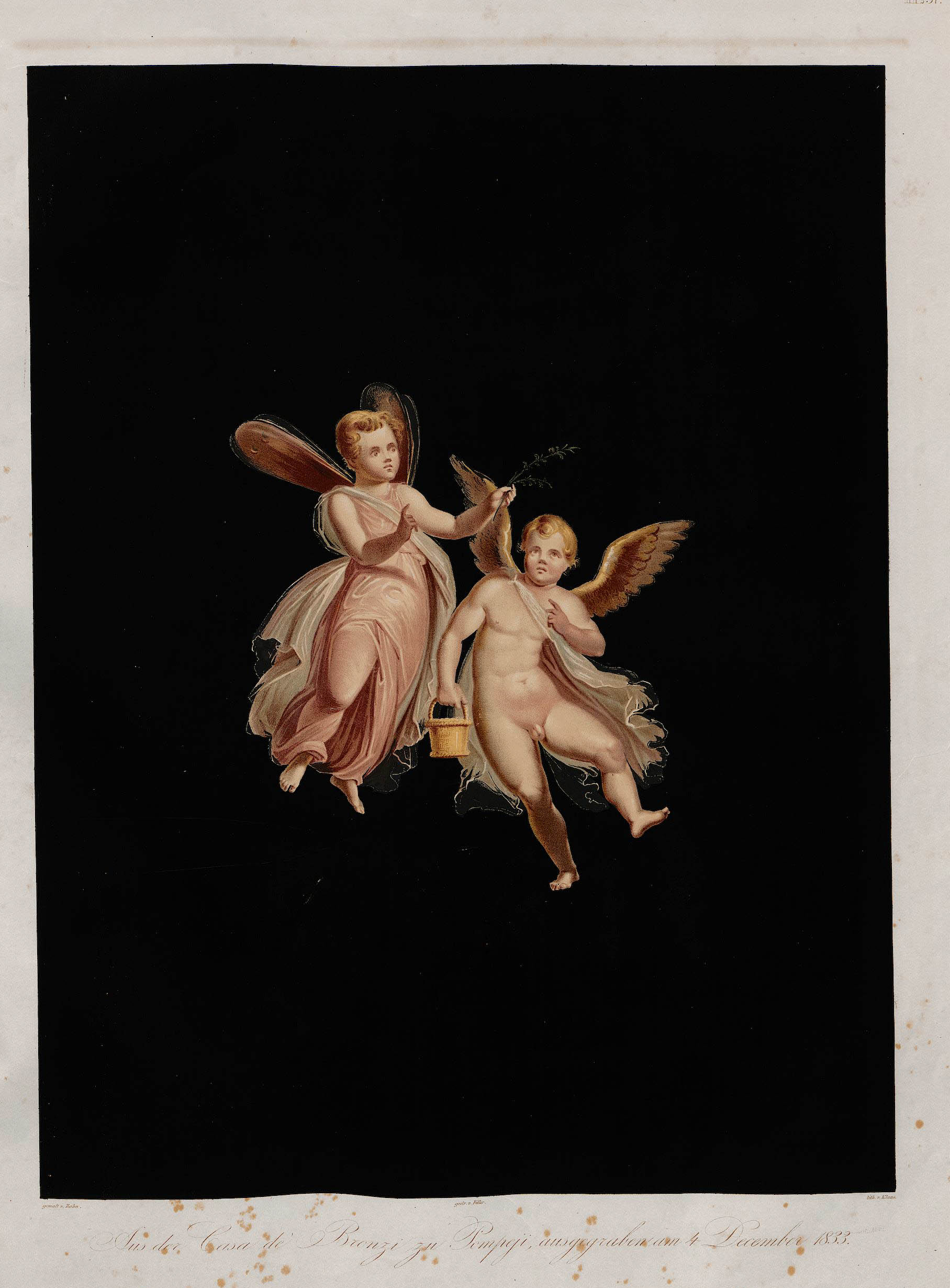
Fresco depicting winged Cupid and Psyche from the west wall of the exedra in the Casa di Bronzi aka Casa della Parete Nera in Pompeii

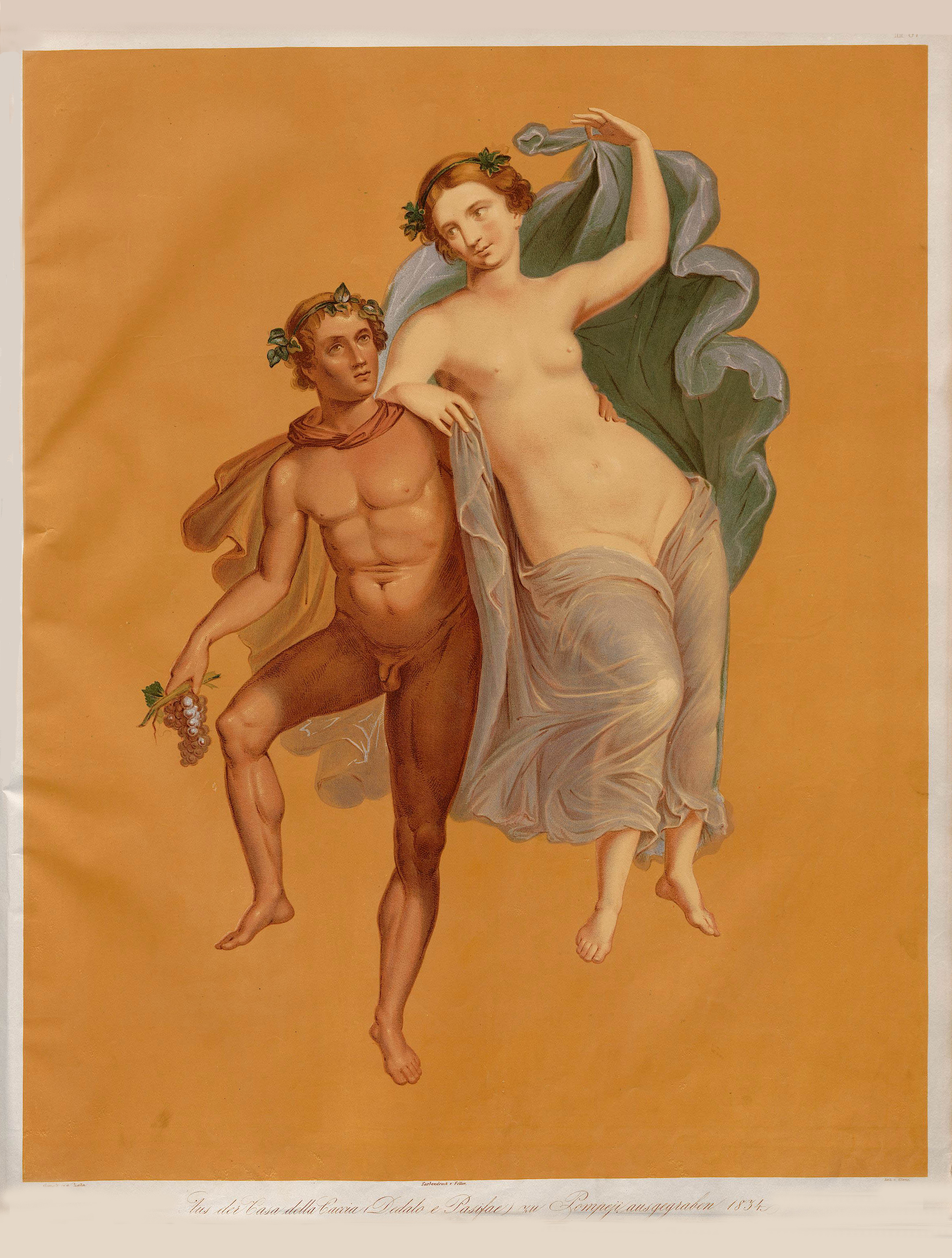
Fresco from the House of the (Ancient) Hunt aka House of Daedalus and Pasiphae in Pompeii

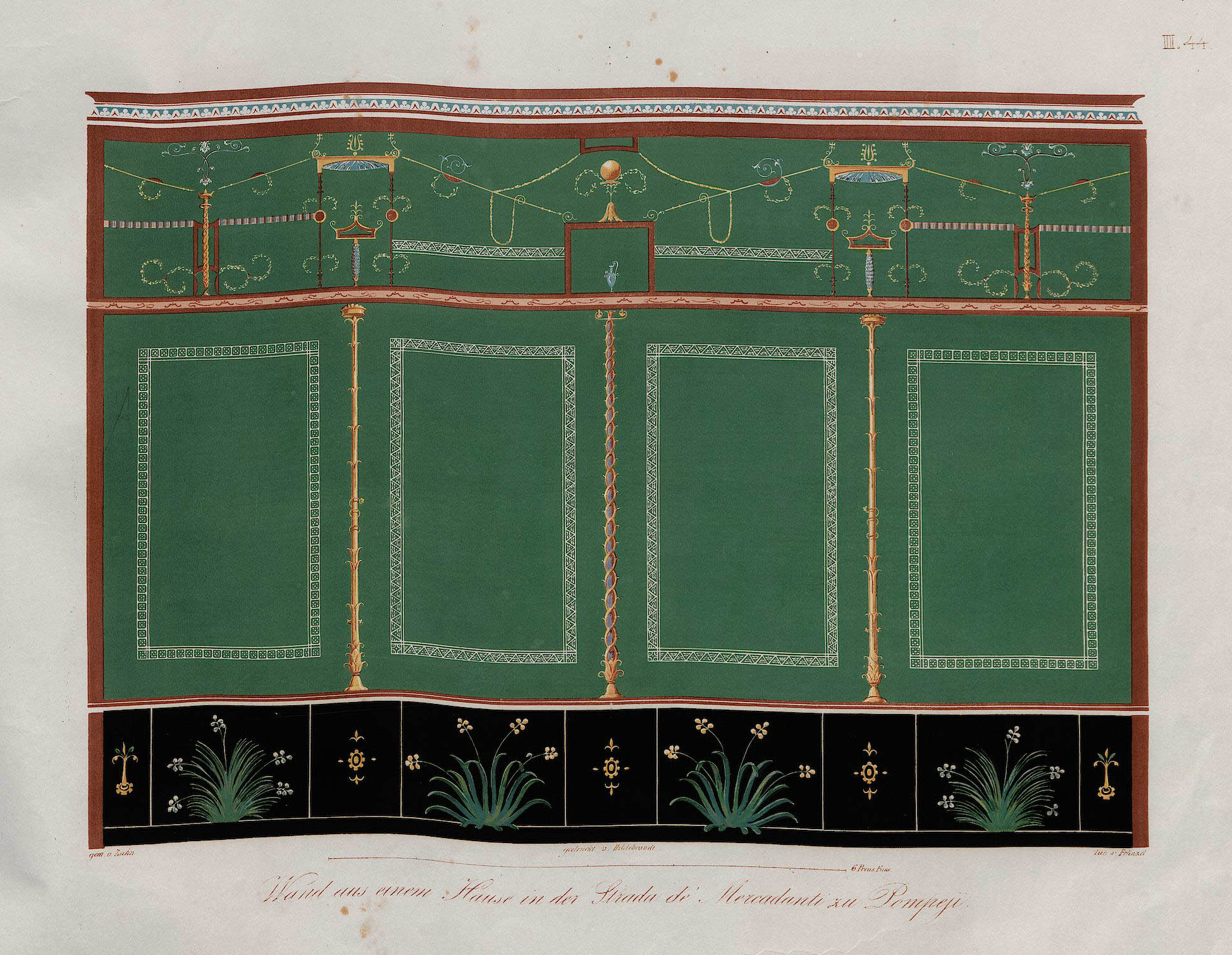
Frescoed wall for a house on the Street of Merchants in Pompeii

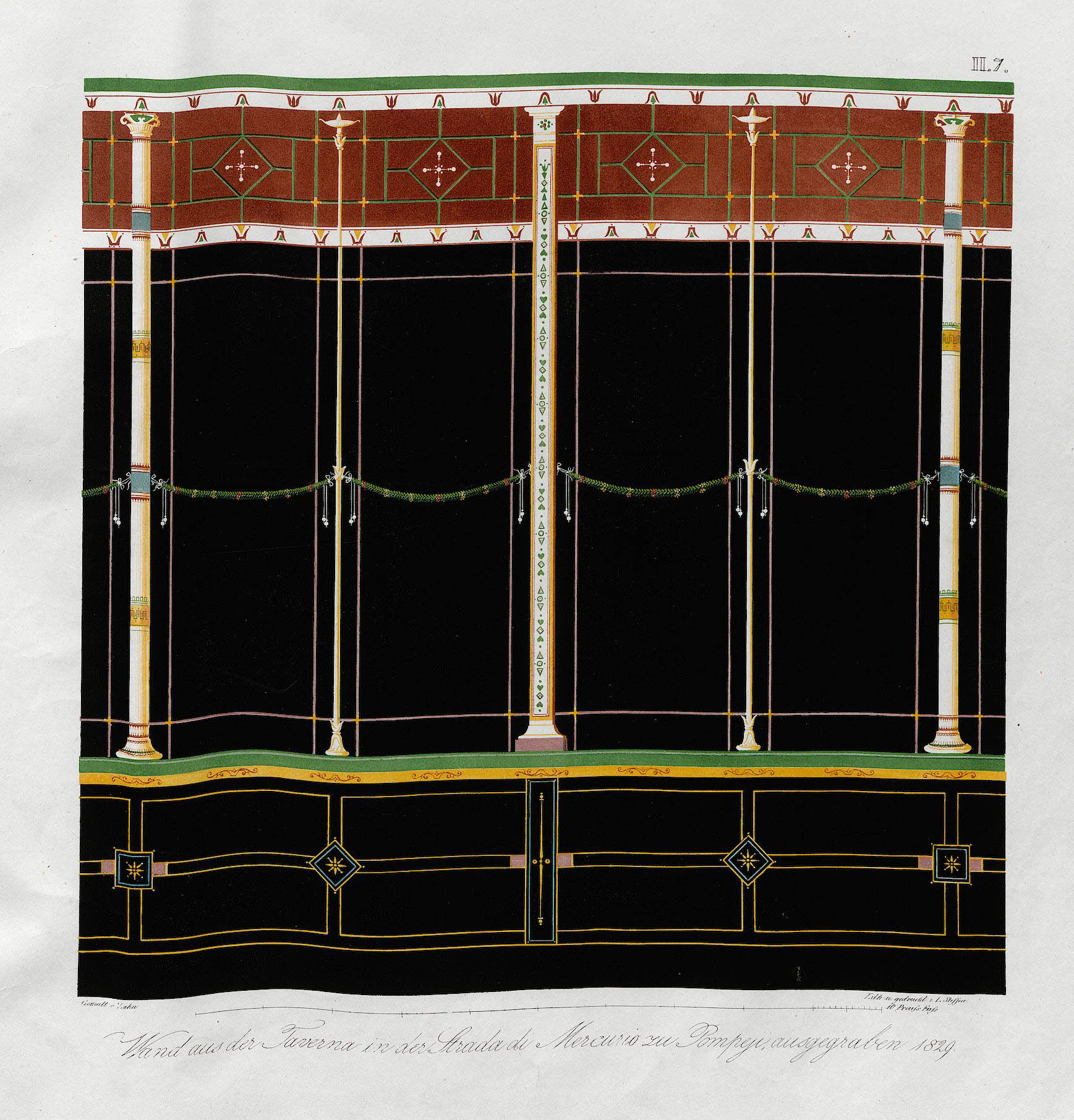
Frescoed wall from a tavern on the Strada di Mercurio in Pompeii excavated in 1829

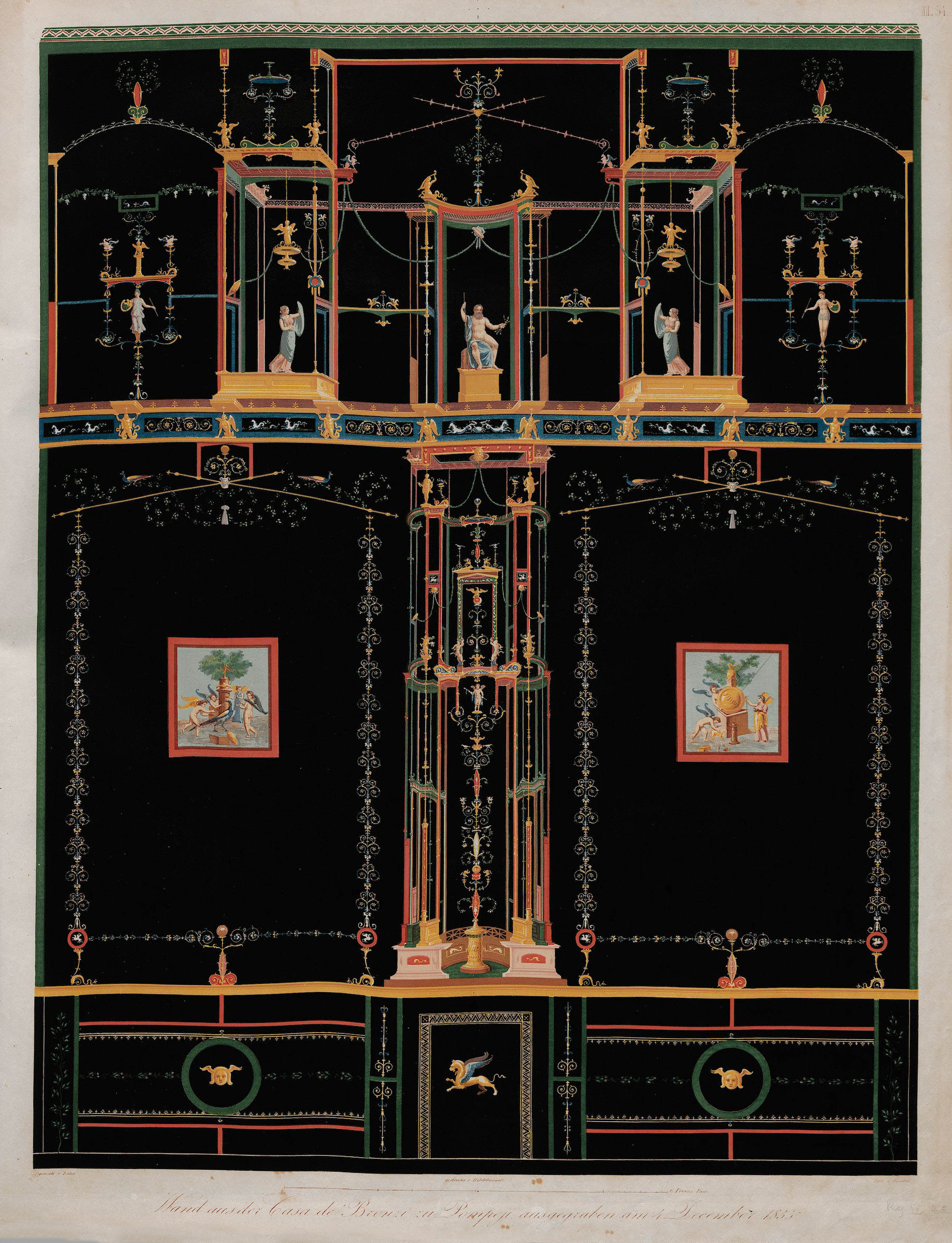
Frescoed wall from the Casa dei Bronzi aka Casa della Parete Nera in Pompeii

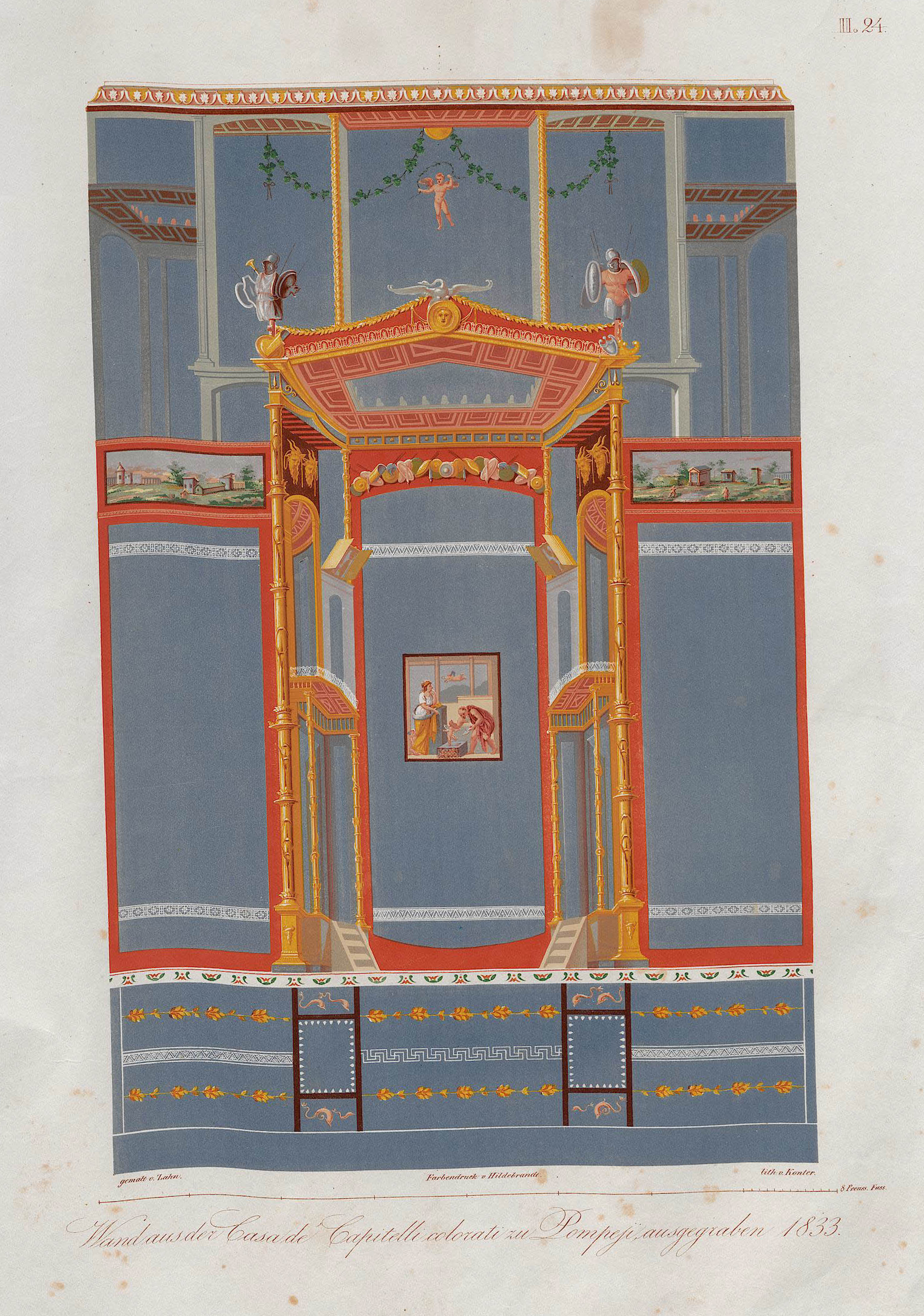
Frescoed wall from the Casa dei Capitelli Colorati in Pompeii excavated in 1833

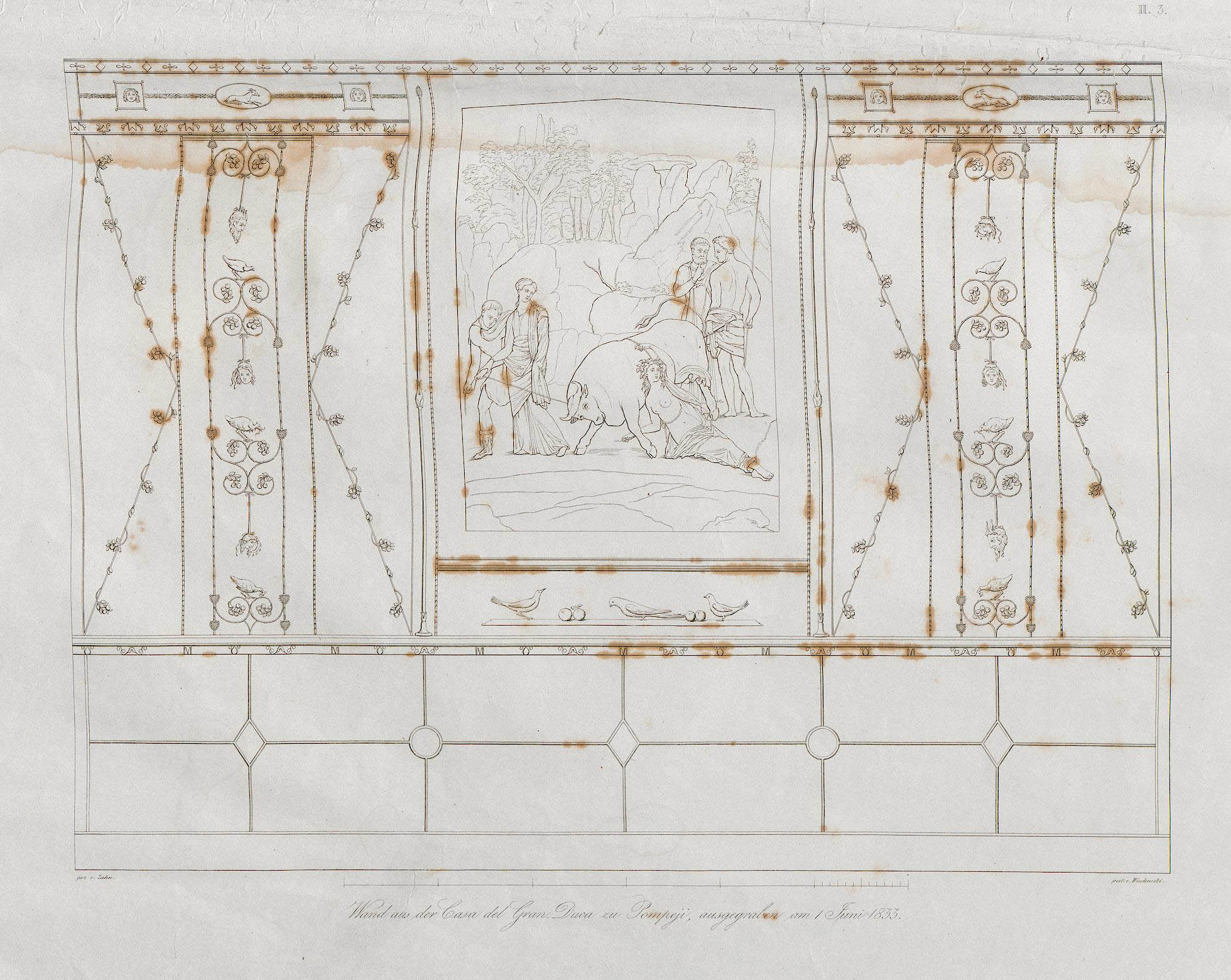
Frescoed wall from the Casa del Granduca di Toscana in Pompeii

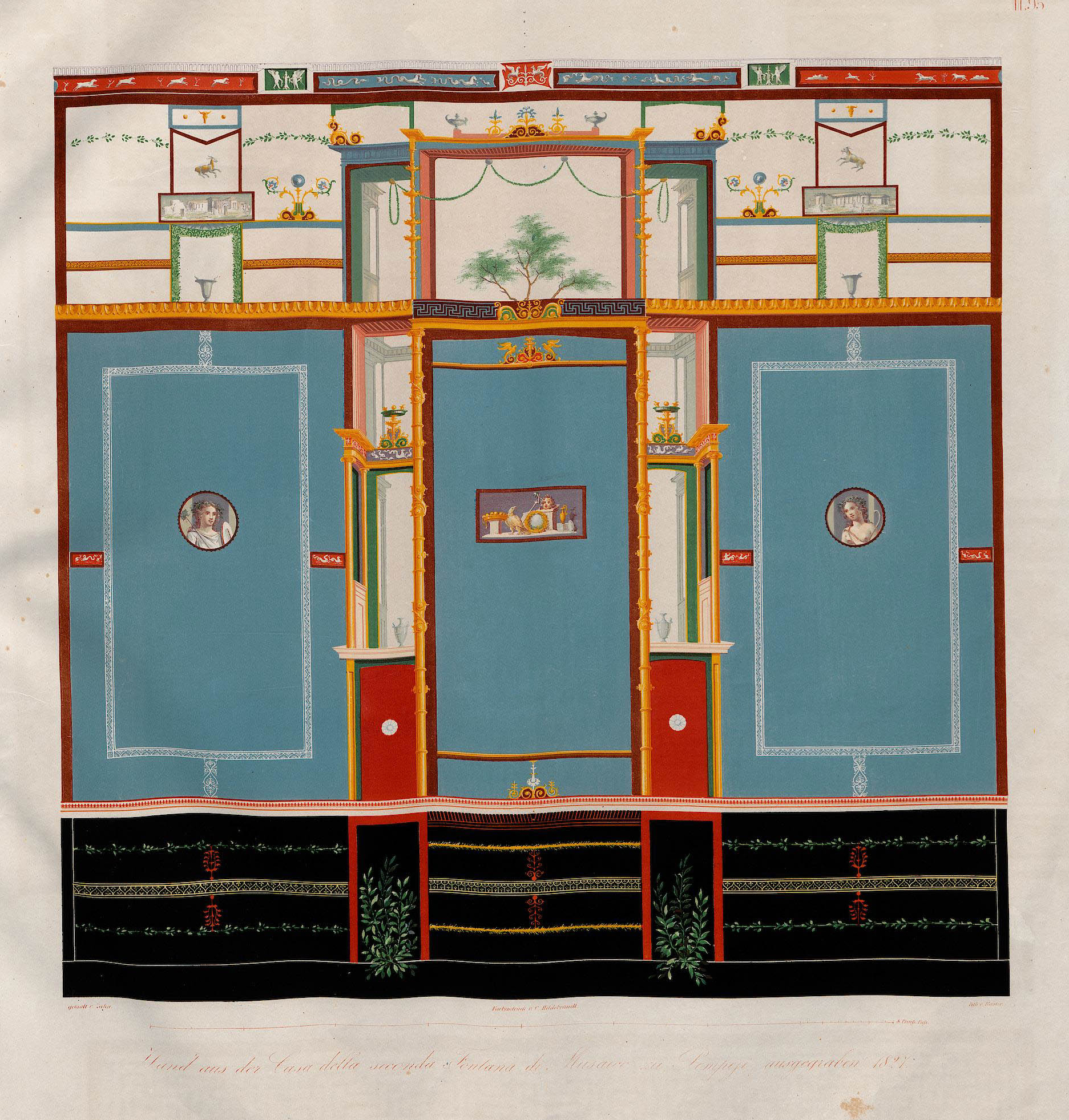
Frescoed wall from the Casa della seconda Fontana di Mosaico (House of the Second - aka Small- Mosaic Fountain in Pompeii

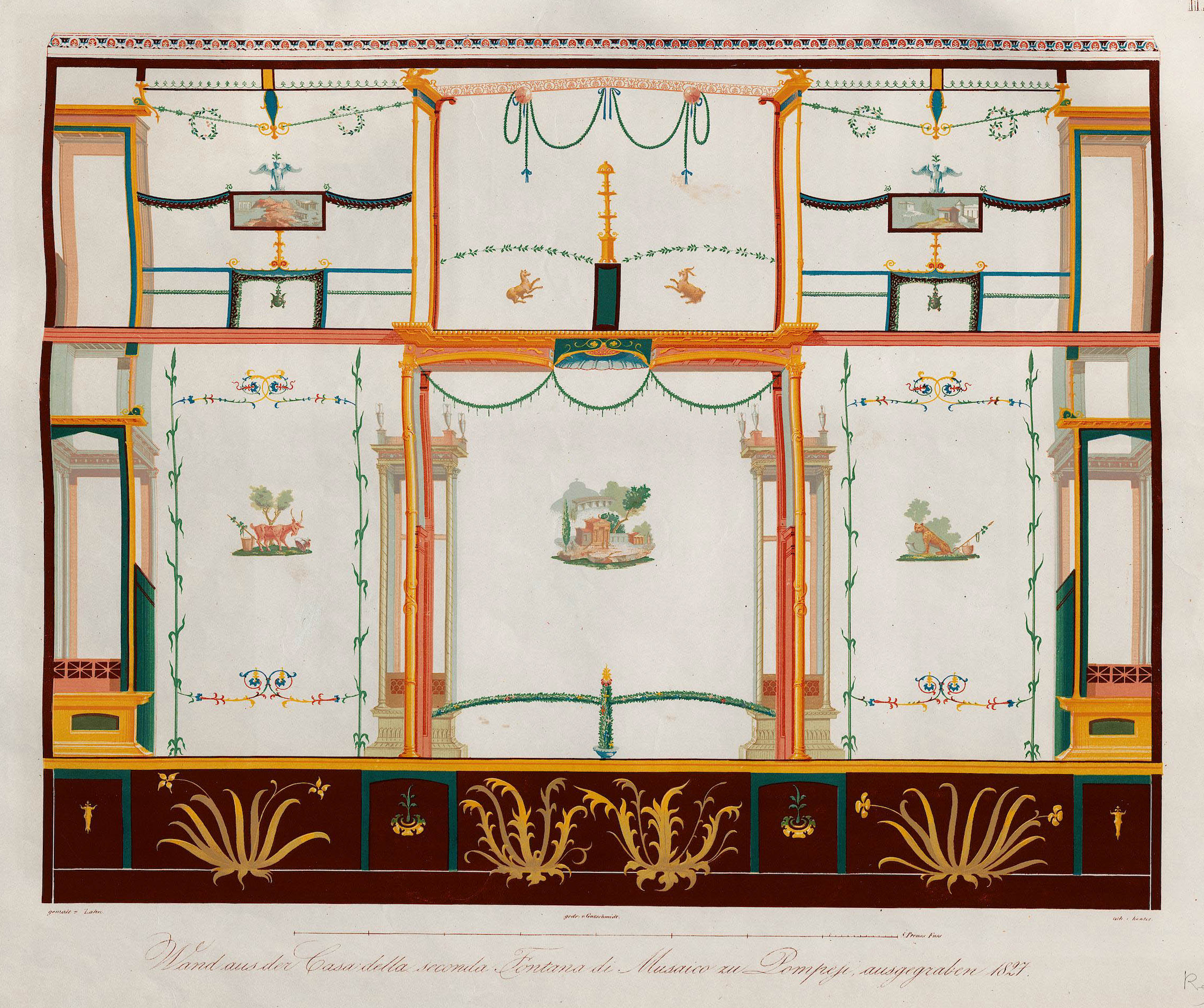
Frescoed wall from the Casa della seconda Fontana di Mosaico (House of the Second (Small) Mosaic Fountain in Pompeii excavated in 1827

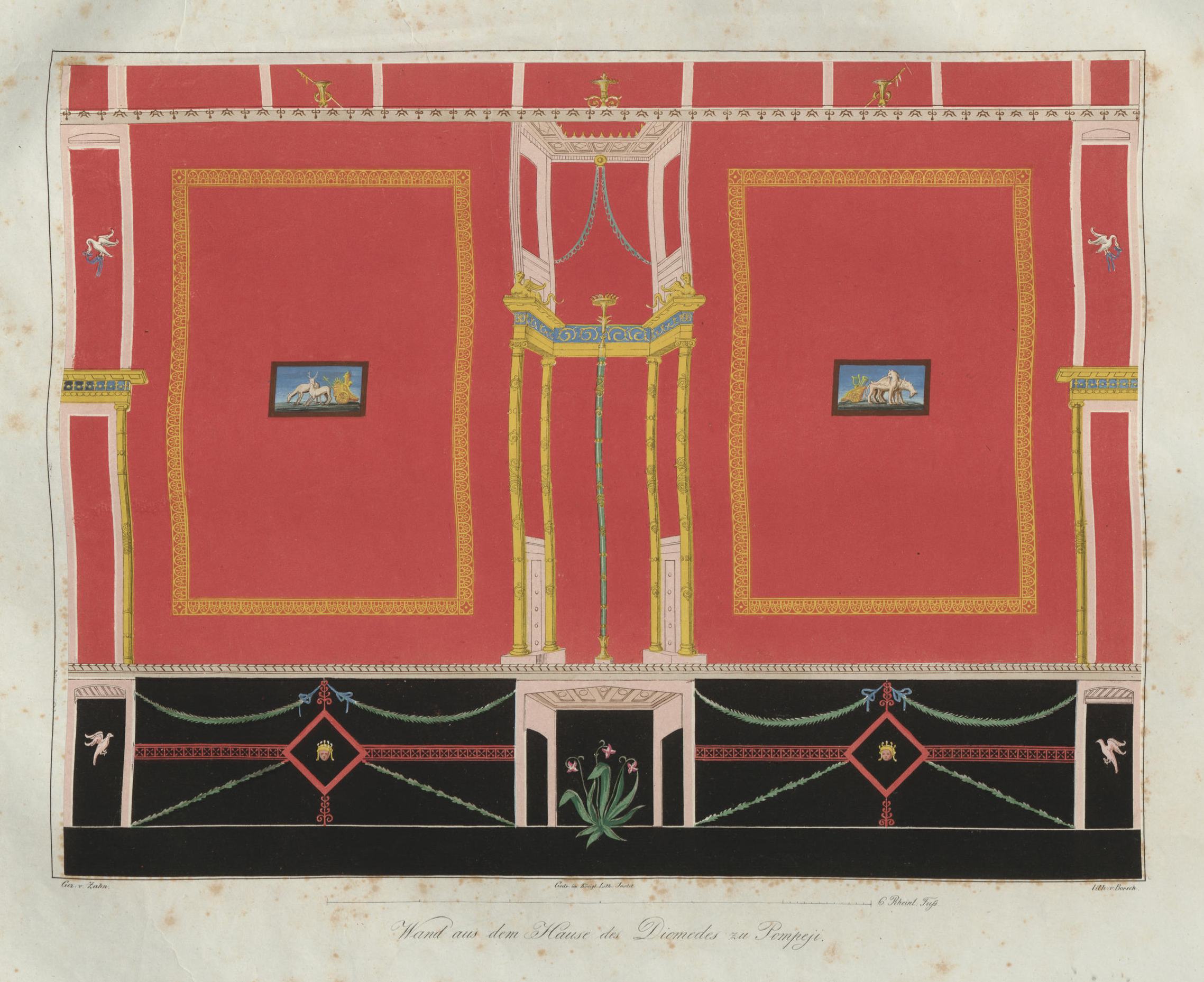
Frescoed wall from the Villa of Diomedes Pompeii

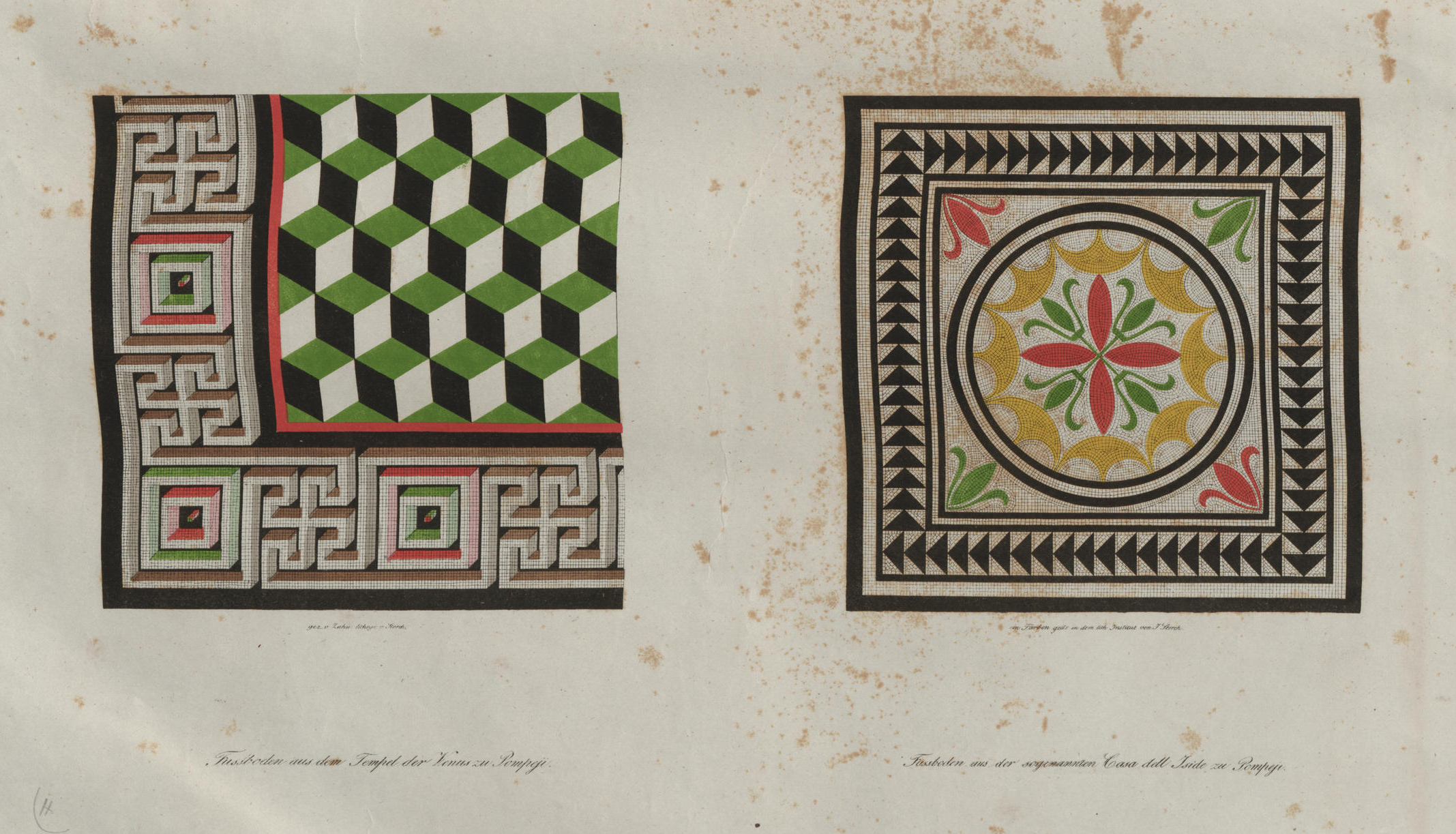
Mosaics from the Temple of Venus (left) and Casa dell Iside (et Io) (Right) Pompeii

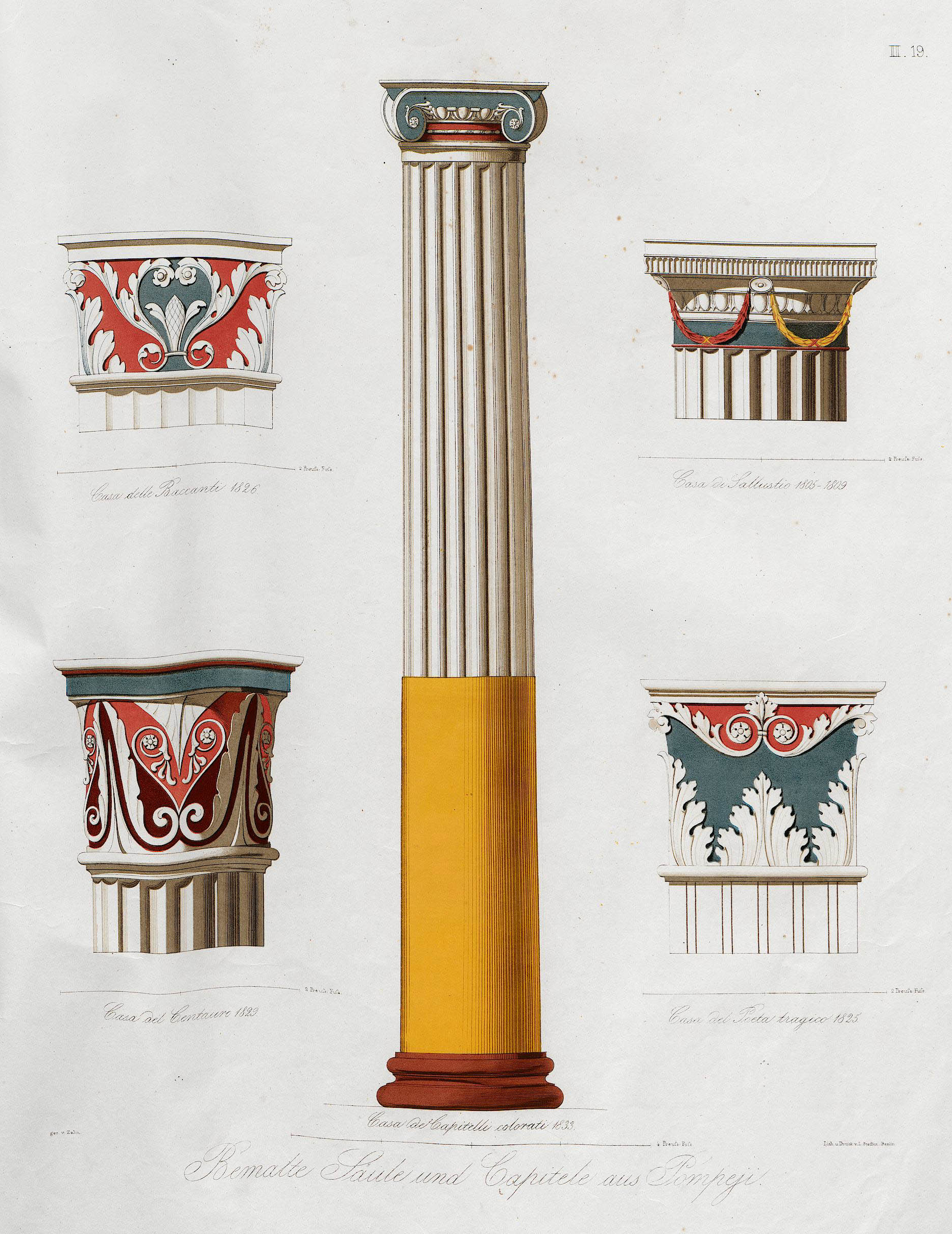
Painted columns and capitals from Casa delle Baccanti,, Casa di Sallustio, Casa del Centauro, Casa dei Capitelli Colorati, Casa del Poeta Tragico in Pompeii

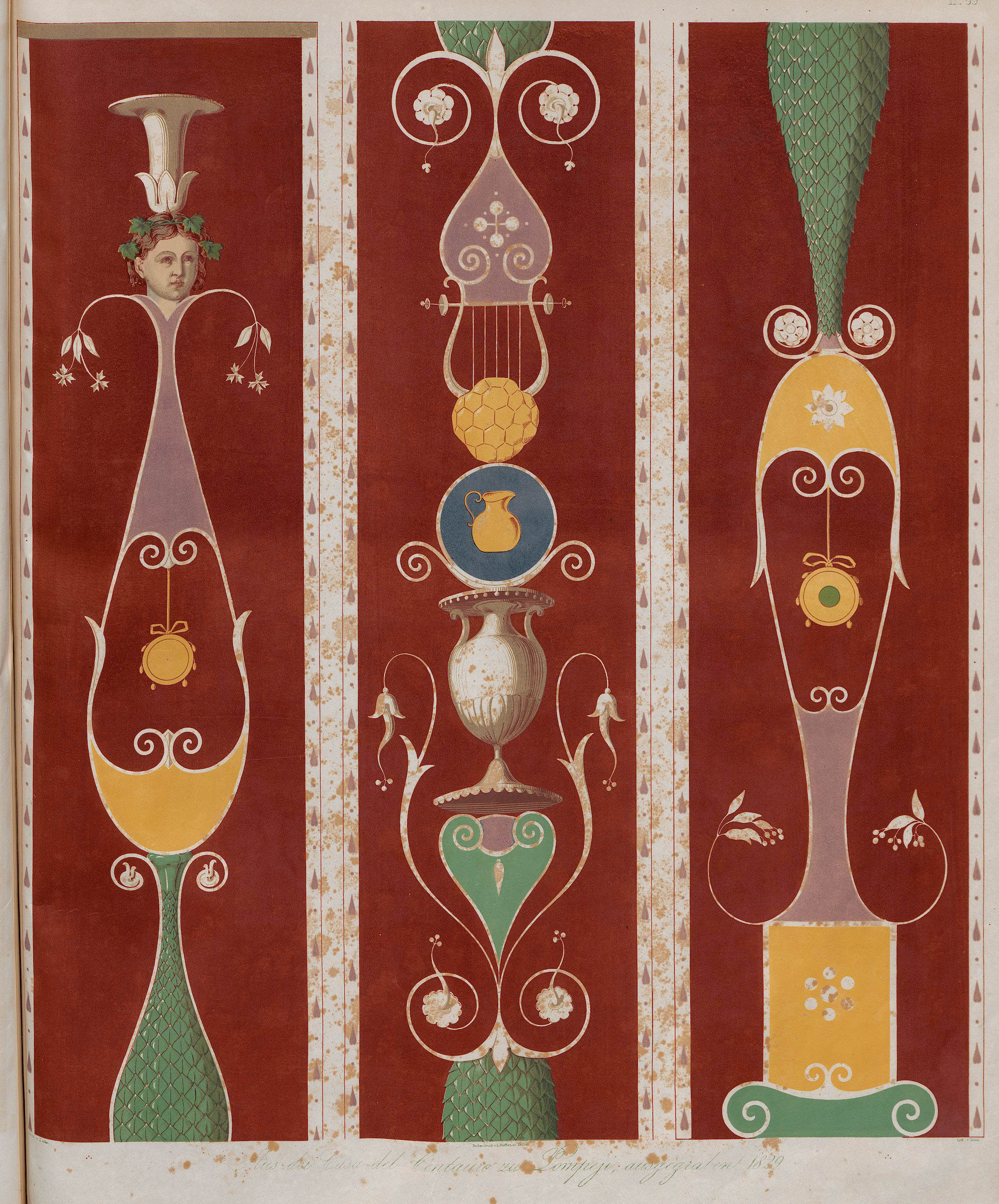
Wall pattern from the Casa del Centauro in Pompeii excavated in 1829

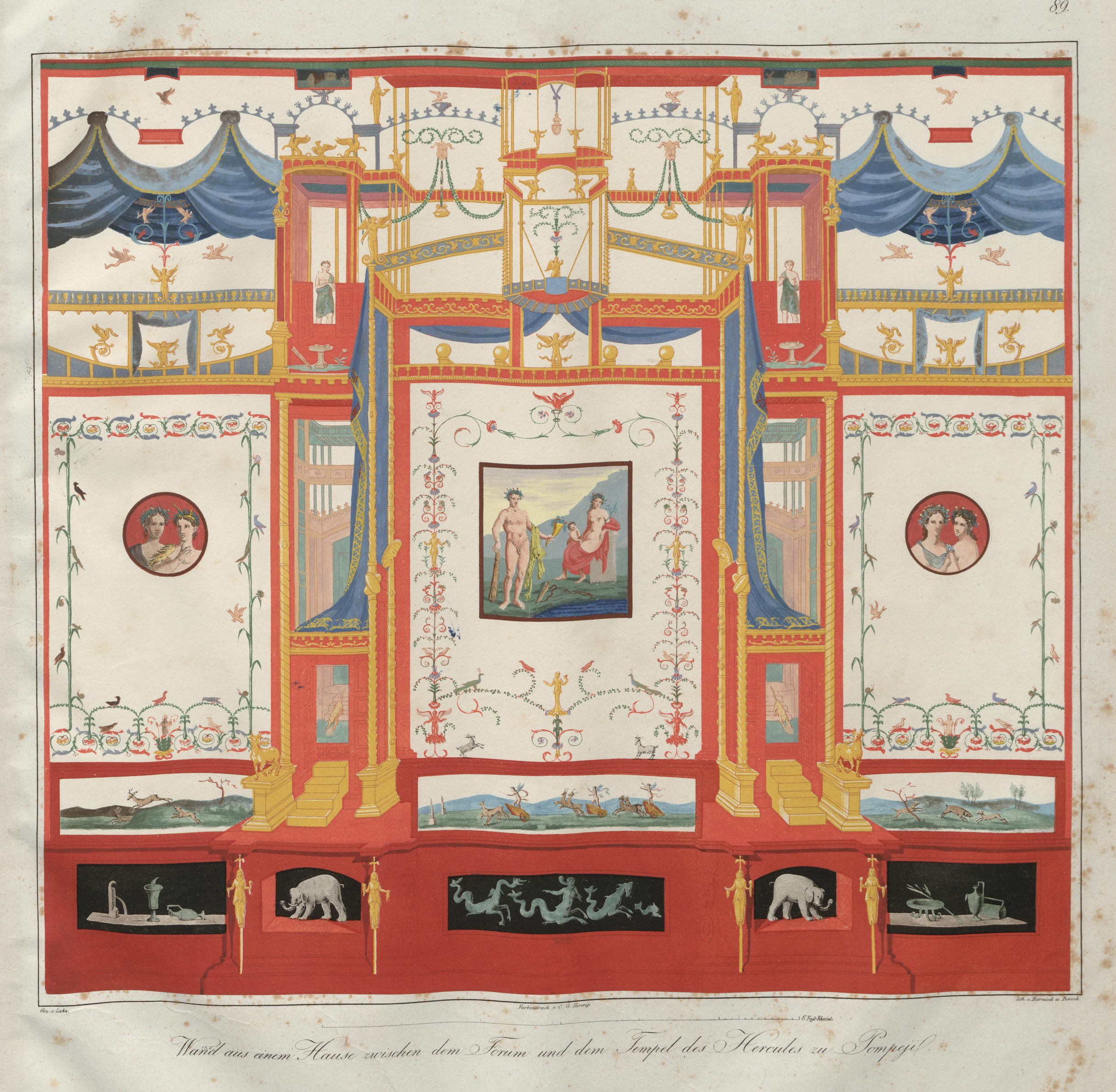
Watercolor of a wall fresco from a house between the Forum and the Temple of Hercules in Pompeii

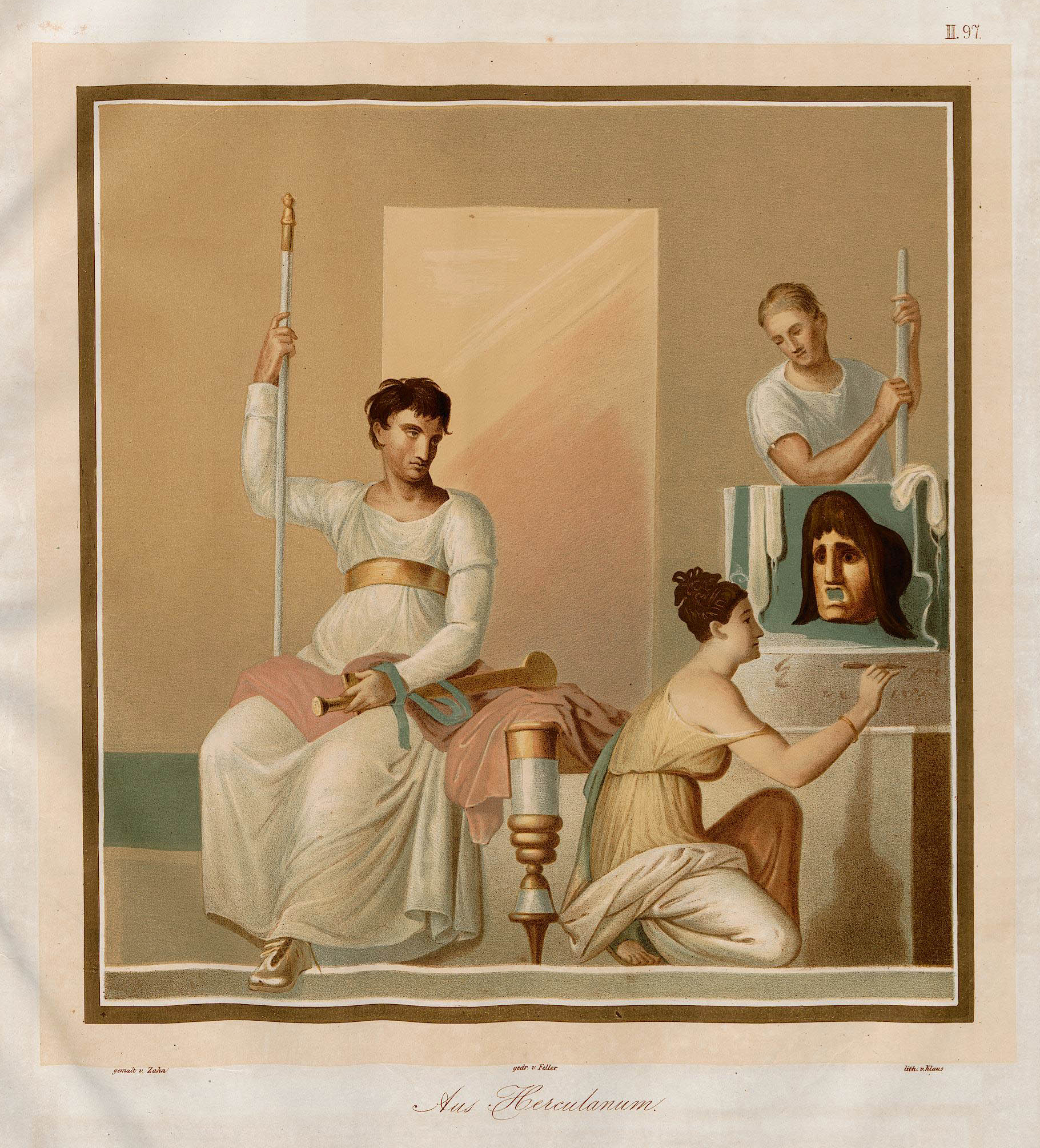
Fresco from Herculaneum (Apollo, god of music and the arts, watching a female artist)

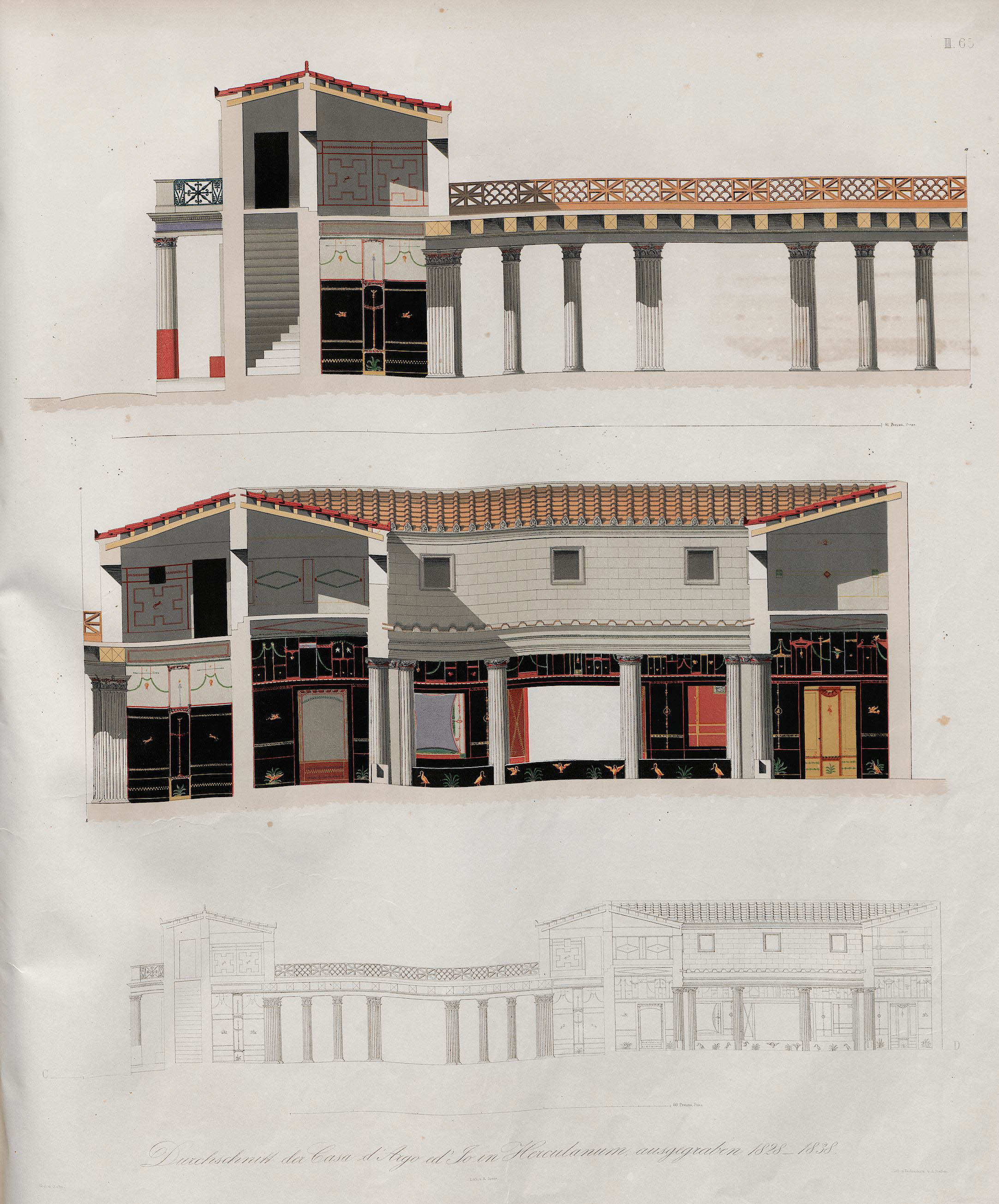
Cross-section of the Casa d'Argo aka Casa di Perseo e Medusa in Herculaneum excavated between 1828-1838

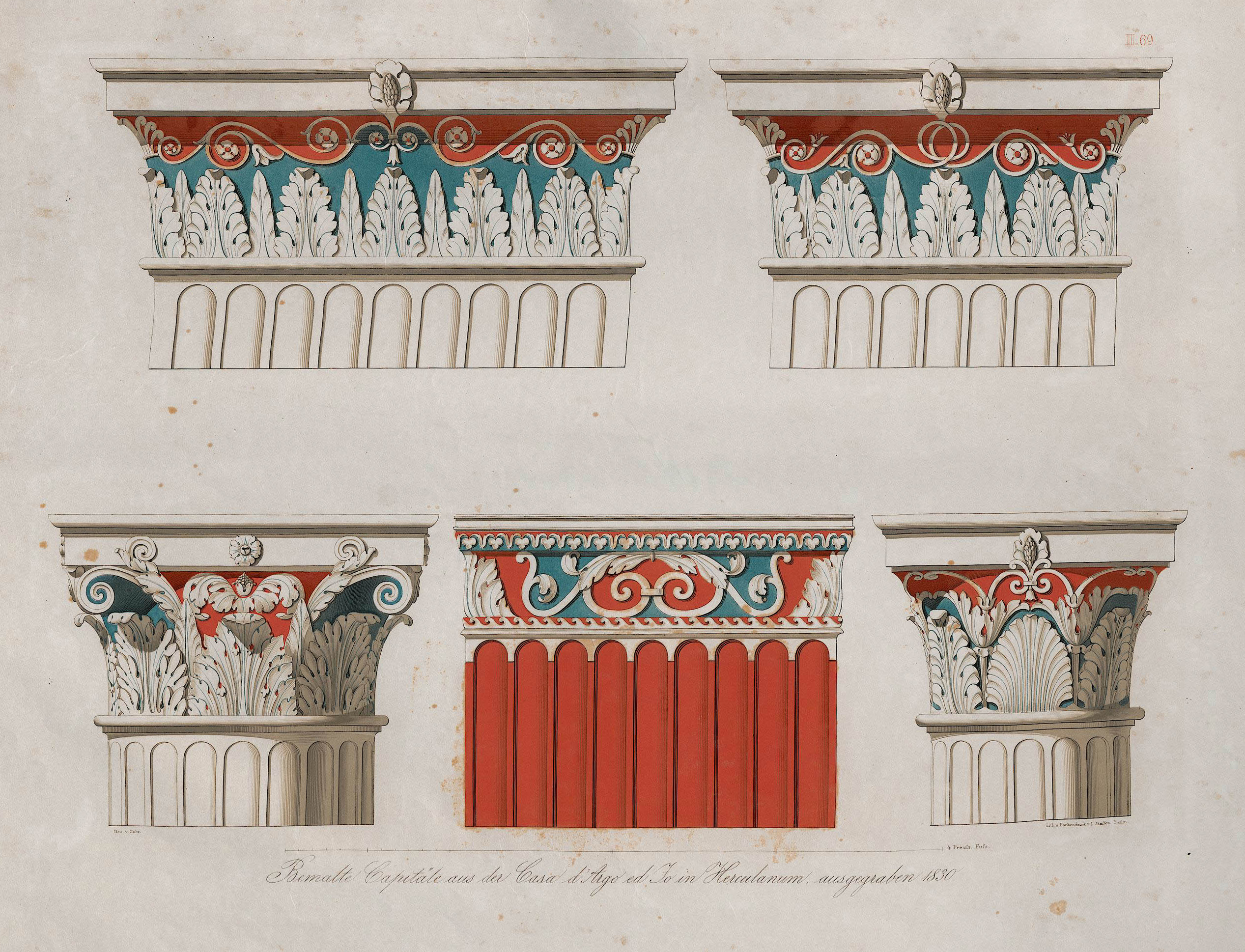
Painted capitals from the Casa d'Argo in Herculaneum excavated in 1830
