= Wilhelm Litten =

German diplomat, writer (1880–1932)

Wilhelm Litten (born August 5, 1880, in St. Petersburg, † January 28, 1932, in Baghdad) was a German diplomat, orientalist, writer and translator. During his time as a dragoman at the German Embassy in Tehran, he collected materials from which he developed regional, cultural and economic history studies. During World War I, in early 1916, he witnessed the death marches of Armenians in the Ottoman Empire. His report, The Path of Horror, is a source on the Armenian genocide. After the war, Litten continued to work in the diplomatic service. From 1920 to 1924 he was consul in Libau and from 1928 in Baghdad, as well as chargé d'affaires of the German Reich, thereafter establishing diplomatic relations with Iraq.

== Works ==
- Ulrich Gehrke: Deutsche Beiträge zur Kenntnis Irans im 20. Jahrhundert. In: Orient 12 (1971), S. 167–177.
- Gerhard Keiper, Martin Kröger (Hrsg.): Biographisches Handbuch des deutschen Auswärtigen Dienstes 1871–1945. Band 3: L–R. Schöningh, Paderborn 2007, ISBN 978-3-506-71842-6.

== Sources ==
- Wilhelm Litten: Persische Flitterwochen. Georg Stilke, Berlin 1925, S. 1–4 und 349
- Wilhelm Litten: Persische Flitterwochen, S. 270–279
- Carl Alexander Krethlow: Colmar Freiherr von der Goltz und der Genozid an den Armeniern 1915–1916. In SozialGeschichte 21, H. 3 (2006), S. 74f.
- Der Weg des Grauens. In: Der Orient. Jg. 1920, Nr. 10/12, S. 61–67; auch als Flugblatt Nr. 7: Der Weg des Grauens. Potsdam 1920.
