= George Wilhelm =

Captain in the Union Army (1829–1920)

George Wilhelm (April 2, 1829 – August 20, 1920) was an American recipient of the Medal of Honor who fought in the American Civil War.

== Biography ==
George Wilhelm was born in Scioto County, Ohio, on April 2, 1829. Little is known about his early childhood or family life, until his marriage to Emily Carter in 1856. George and Emily would have eight children. George also married Laura Amanda Cone in 1887, so he must have been divorced from Emily at some point, inasmuch as she lived until 1923. In August 1861, just five months after the start of the Civil War, he enlisted in Company F of the 56th Ohio. He was commissioned as captain on August 21, 1861, and mustered in with the regiment on December 12, 1861.

With the rest of the regiment, Wilhelm had been surprised by Confederate forces at Shiloh, Tennessee, but had escaped injury. His only other serious action to date was at the Siege of Corinth.

It was now May 16, 1863, and the 56th Ohio Infantry Regiment, part of the Second Brigade, Twelfth Division, XII Corps, was preparing to launch an attack on Confederate troops at Champion Hill as part of the Vicksburg Campaign.

The attack began around noon and lasted for several hours before Confederate General John C. Pemberton withdrew his troops toward Vicksburg. Before Pemberton’s retreat, however, the men from the Buckeye state came under heavy fire from Rebel sharpshooters while making their way through heavily wooded terrain. Wilhelm was ordered to send two companies forward to serve as skirmishers.

The plan was for Wilhelm’s skirmishers to draw fire while the remainder of his men would work their way across a small clearing in an effort to drive the sharpshooters out of the woods on the opposite side. Despite gaining some ground, Wilhelm lost a large number of men and was unable to hold the ground he had just controlled. He was soon forced to withdraw back to the main body.

Five more assaults were made, all to no avail. In the fifth charge, Wilhelm was struck in the left breast, the bullet passing through him. In the heat of the battle, he was left behind on the field. As the Federal forces pulled back, the Confederates advanced. Soon, the gray line reached the location where Wilhelm had fallen, and a Rebel took him captive.

As his captor moved him to the Confederate rear, they reached Baker’s Creek, where Wilhelm persuaded his captor to allow him to stop and bathe his wound. Wilhelm would say later that the cool water stopped the flow of blood and rejuvenated him to some degree. The two remained at the creek for several minutes, taking advantage of the shade and the relief from the oppressive heat. As they rested, Wilhelm noticed that the Rebel was gradually ignoring Wilhelm, focusing his attention on the nearby battle.

When his guard temporarily turned away from him, Wilhelm saw his opportunity. He rushed toward the man and grabbed his gun, leveling it at the Confederate’s chest. Not giving the man any time to recover from the unpleasant surprise, Wilhelm ordered him to begin moving toward the Union line. Taking a circuitous route around the fighting to avoid detection, the two were forced to stop several times to accommodate Wilhelm’s labored breathing. Not wishing to alert his captor-turned-captive to his own extreme pain and weakness from loss of blood and a possible collapsed lung, Wilhelm pretended to be using the breaks to watch for Confederate pursuers.

Eventually, they reached the Federal line, where Wilhelm turned the man over to guards before seeking medical treatment. He survived his wound and was able to soon return to his regiment, where he was ultimately promoted to lieutenant-colonel. He remained with the 56th Ohio until he mustered out on Christmas Day 1866, at New Orleans. Returning home to Ohio, he worked as a salesman.

Wilhelm was presented his Medal of Honor on November 17, 1887 for actions at Champion Hill, or Bakers Creek, Mississippi on May 16, 1863. After his death in Dayton, Ohio he was buried in Greenville Cemetery, Greenville, Mississippi.

== Medal of Honor Citation ==
For extraordinary heroism on 16 May 1863, while serving with, in action at Champion Hill (Baker's Creek), Mississippi. Having been badly wounded in the breast and captured, Captain Wilhelm made a prisoner of his captor and brought him into camp.
