= Vilho Cornér =

Finnish jurist, bank director and politician (1868–1946)

Samuli Vilho Cornér (17 February 1868 – 22 April 1946) was a Finnish jurist, bank director and politician, born in Pielisjärvi. He was a member of the Parliament of Finland from 1913 to 1916, representing the Finnish Party. After the Finnish Party ceased to exist in December 1918, Cornér joined the National Coalition Party. He was the mayor of Heinola from 1920 to 1938.
