= Wilhelm Hansen (footballer) =

Norwegian footballer (1895-1974)

Personal information
- Date of birth: 4 March 1895
- Date of death: 2 April 1974 (aged 79)

International career
Years	Team	Apps	(Gls)
1913–1914	Norway	2	(0)

Wilhelm Hansen (4 March 1895 – 2 April 1974) was a Norwegian footballer. He played in two matches for the Norway national football team in 1913 to 1914.
