= Wilhelm Röttger =

German executioner (1894–1946)

Wilhelm Friedrich Röttger (6 March 1894 – 13 September 1946) was an executioner in Nazi Germany.

== Life ==
In May 1940, he replaced Gottlob Bordt as first assistant of Friedrich Hehr. When Hehrs became ill in 1941, Röttger conducted his first 26 executions from 2 November 1941 until 5 December 1942.

In June 1942, Röttger applied for the new executioner's position in Berlin. On 23 September 1942, he became executioner of Vollstreckungsbezirkes IV, which consisted of the prisons in Berlin-Plötzensee and Brandenburg-Görden. During the next years Röttger conducted several thousands of executions. Of the 16,000 executions that took place during the Third Reich, Röttger and executioners Johann Reichhart and Ernst Reindel were responsible for 11,881.

Röttger was described by neighbors as a well presented and charming individual, who simply commented that his work was involved in the prison judicial system. Other sources claim Röttger was crude and fond of making jokes even during his job role, and smoked heavily.

In 1946 Röttger was located in a hospital in Hannover. He died shortly after his imprisonment in Hannover.
