= Wilhelm Hansen (rower) =

Norwegian rower (1884–1931)

Personal information
- Nationality: Norwegian
- Born: 15 March 1884 Sarpsborg, Norway
- Died: 20 June 1931 (aged 47) Akershus, Norway

Sport
- Sport: Rowing

Wilhelm Emanuel Hansen (15 March 1884 – 20 June 1931) was a Norwegian rower. He competed in the men's eight event at the 1908 Summer Olympics.
