= Wilhelm Hansen (art collector) =

Danish businessman and art collector (1868–1936)

Vilhelm Hansen
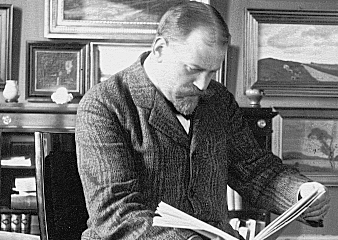
- Jacob Holm painted in 1934
- Born: 27 November 1868; Copenhagen, Denmark
- Died: 4 February 1936 (aged 67); Ordrupgaard, Denmark
- Occupations: Businessman and art collector
- Known for: Ordrupgaard Art Museum
- Awards: Commandfer of the Dannebrog (2nd class)

Wilhelm Peter Henning Hansen (27 November 1868 - 4 February 1936) was a Danish businessman and art collector, founder of the Ordrupgaard Art Museum north of Copenhagen. He made a fortune in the insurance industry as founder of the Danish insurance companies Dansk Folkeforsikringsanstalt and Mundus, and as managing director of Hafnia, another Danish insurance company, from 1905 until his death in 1936.

== Early life and education ==
Hansen was born on 27 November 1868 in Copenhagen, the son of Niels Christian Adolph Hansen (1829-1918) and Josephine Marie Sophie Buntzen (1842-1914). He graduated from Efterslægtselskabets skole in 1884. He qualified for the College of Advanced Technology in 1886 and taught volapyk.

== Career ==
Hansen began his career in the insurance industry when he in circa 1888 started working for the British life insurance company Greshams' office in Copenhagen. He was just 28 years old when he in 1896 was a driving force behind the foundation of Dansk Folkeforsikringsanstalt. Another life insurance company founded at his initiative, Mundus, which focused on the international market, was less successful. Mundus was in 1905 sold to Hafnia and Hansen was at the same event appointed as one of Hafnia's directors. He contributed to establishing the company as the largest Danish provider of life insurance.

He was for a while president of the Danish Association of Life insurance companies. He was also a co-founder of Dana og Danske Phønix. He was also a co-founder of Paris-based La Populaire.

== Art collector ==
Hansen founded his art collection when he acquired his first artworks in 1892. It was initially exclusively focused on 19th century Danish art. Later on, partly assisted by Théodore Duret, he also began to collect French art, benefitting from the favourable situation on the French art market during World War I. In 1918, Wilhelm Hansen together with fellow collector Herman Heilbuth (1861–1945) and art dealers Winkel & Magnussen, founded a consortium which was of great importance to the French purchases. Their declared goal was "to Buy and sell works of art with the purpose of bringing good and outstanding art to Scandinavia". For this reason they bought several collections "en bloc" in Paris.

His collection included works by artists such as Corot, Courbet, Daumier and Gauguin as well as early works by Cézanne, Degas, Manet, Monet, Pissarro, Renoir and Sisley. The bankruptcy of Landmandsbanken in 1923 forced him to sell part of his collection but some of the most important works were acquired by the Ny Carlsberg Foundation and are now part of the collections of the Ny Carlsberg Glyptotek. Hansen was later once again to expand his collection with new acquisitions,

In 1918, Hansen founded the French Art Society (Fransk kunst) with the aim of widening the knowledge of French art in Denmark. It arranged a number of exhibitions, culminating with its 1928 exhibition of 19th-century French art in the Ny Carlsberg Glyptotek in 1928, presenting a number of the Louvre's best works, and its exhibition of 18th-century French art at the Charlottenborg Exhibition Building. He was also president of Kunstforeningen from 1920 to 1925.

He charged Gotfred Tvede with designing a museum building on the Ordrupgaard estate. He opened it to the public in 1918 but closed it again after the sale of part of the collection to the Ny Carlsberg Glyptotek.

== Personal life ==
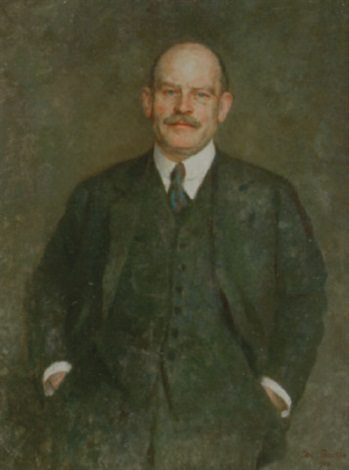
Wilhelm Hansen painted by Julius Paulsen in 1926

Hansen married Henny Nathalie Soelberg Jensen (5 May 1870 – 1951), a daughter of miller and later traveling salesman Carl S. J. (1831-1908) and Christiane Henriette Pouline Cathrine Dyrhauge (1831–91), on 30 October 1891 in Frederiksberg.

He was created a Knight in the Order of the Dannebrog in 1909, was awarded the Cross of Honour in 1921 and was created a 2nd-class Commander of the Order of the Dannebrog in 1922.

He died in a traffic accident on 4 February 1936 and is buried at Vestre Cemetery in Copenhagen.
