= Wilhelm Hansen (politician) =

Norwegian politician (1776–1851)

Wilhelm Hansen (7 October 1776 – 13 October 1851) was a Norwegian politician.

He was born in Vestby as a twin. He received burghership in Fredrikshald in 1807 and worked as a timber merchant, trader and real estate owner in that city. He was also consul for the United Kingdom.

Hansen was elected to the first session of the Parliament of Norway in 1814; later re-elected in 1824 and 1830, representing the constituency of Fredrikshald.

Hansen was decorated as a Knight of the Order of Vasa. He was married to Anna Cathrine Wiel (1785–1864), and was the father of MP Martin Hansen. He died in October 1851 in Fredrikshald.
