= Williamson (surname) =

The surname Williamson was first found in the Royal burgh of Peebles, where this predominantly Scottish Clan who are a Sept of Clan Gunn held a Family Seat anciently, although their interests straddled the English Scottish border and they held territories as far south as Keswick in Cumberland.

Notable people with the surname include:

- Al Williamson (baseball) (1900–1978), American baseball player
- Al Williamson (1931–2010), American cartoonist
- Albert Williamson (1866–after 1891), English footballer
- Alexander Williamson (disambiguation)
- Alf Williamson (1893–1917), Australian Rules footballer
- Alice Muriel Williamson (1869–1933), British novelist; wife of Charles Norris Williamson
- Alison Williamson (born 1971), British archer
- Alix Williamson (1916–2001), American publicist
- Allen Williamson (fl. 1970), American politician
- Amalia Williamson (born 1999), Canadian actress
- Andrew Williamson (disambiguation)
- Anna Williamson (born 1981), British TV presenter
- Anna-Lise Williamson, South African virologist
- Archibald Williamson (disambiguation)
- Arthur Williamson (1930–2020), Scottish footballer
- Ben Williamson (disambiguation), several people
- Benedict Williamson (1868–1948), British architect and Catholic priest
- Benjamin Williamson (disambiguation)
- Bethany Williamson (born 1999), British trampoline gymnast
- Bobby Williamson (born 1961), Scottish football player and manager
- Bree Williamson (born 1979), Canadian actress
- Casey Williamson (1995–2002), American murder victim
- Charles Williamson (disambiguation), several people
- Chris Williamson (disambiguation), multiple people
- Clara McDonald Williamson (1875–1976), American painter
- Corliss Williamson (born 1973), American basketball player
- Craig Williamson (born 1949), South African apartheid-era police officer
- David Williamson (disambiguation), several people
- Delano E. Williamson (1822–1903), Indiana Attorney General
- Devon Williamson, New Zealand playwright
- Dominic Williamson (born 1975), English cricketer
- Donald Williamson (disambiguation)
- Drew Williamson (born 1983), Australian basketball player
- Elizabeth Williamson (disambiguation)
- Eric Williamson (disambiguation)
- Emily Williamson (1855–1936), English philanthropist
- Felix D. Williamson (1921–1947), American World War II flying ace
- Francis Williamson (disambiguation)
- G. A. Williamson (1895–1982), English classicist
- Gavin Williamson (born 1976), British politician
- Gary Williamson (disambiguation)
- Geordie Williamson (born 1981), Australian mathematician
- George Williamson (disambiguation)
- Harold Williamson (disambiguation), several people
- Hedworth Williamson (disambiguation)
- Henry Williamson (disambiguation)
- Herbert Williamson (1871–1946), English football goalkeeper
- Hugh Williamson (disambiguation), several people
- James Williamson (disambiguation), several people
- Jason Williamson, English vocalist and lyricist
- John Williamson (disambiguation), several people
- Johnny Williamson (1929–2021), English footballer
- Johnny Williamson (1895–1979), Scottish footballer
- Joseph Williamson (disambiguation), several people
- Kane Williamson (born 1990), New Zealand cricketer
- Kendall Williamson (born 1999), American football player
- Kenneth Williamson (1914–1977), British ornithologist
- Kevin Williamson (disambiguation), several people
- Kramer Williamson (died 2013), American sprint car racing driver
- Lambert Williamson (1907–1975), British composer of film scores
- Leah Williamson (born 1997), English association footballer
- Lee Williamson (disambiguation)
- Linda Williamson (born 1952), American politician
- Lionel Williamson (born 1944), Australian rugby league footballer
- Liz Williamson (1949–2024), Australian textile artist
- Liz Williamson (dancer) (1919–1996), American dancer, dance teacher, and choreographer
- Malcolm Williamson (1931–2003), Australian composer
- Malcolm J. Williamson, British mathematician and cryptographer
- Marianne Williamson (born 1952), American spiritual activist, author, and lecturer
- Marjorie Williamson (1913–2002), English physicist
- Mark Williamson (disambiguation), several people
- Martha Williamson (born 1955), American television writer, producer, author, activist, Christian
- Martha Burton Williamson (1843–1922), American malacologist and journalist
- Matthew Williamson (born 1971), British fashion designer
- Maurice Williamson (born 1951), New Zealand politician
- Michael Williamson (disambiguation), multiple people
- Moses O. Williamson (1850–1935), American politician
- Ned Williamson (1857–1895), American professional baseball player
- Nicholas Williamson, English secret agent, arrested in 1595
- Nicol Williamson (1936–2011), Scottish actor
- Norman Williamson (born 1969), jockey
- Norris C. Williamson (1874–1949), American politician
- Oliver E. Williamson (1932–2020), American economist
- Paul Williamson (born 1948), retired Anglo-Catholic clergyman and controversialist
- Pliny W. Williamson (1876–1958), New York state senator
- Pooh Williamson (born 1973), American basketball player and coach
- Richard Williamson (disambiguation), several people
- Robert Williamson (disambiguation)
- Robin Williamson (born 1943), Scottish singer-songwriter and guitarist
- Robin C. N. Williamson (born 1942), president of the Royal Society of Medicine
- Roger Williamson (1948–1973), English Formula 1 driver
- Ron Williamson (1953–2004), American baseball player wrongly convicted of rape and murder
- Roy Williamson (1936–1990), Scottish songwriter, most notably of The Corries
- Roy Williamson (bishop) (1932–2019), English clergyman
- Samuel Williamson (disambiguation), several people
- Shirley Williamson (1875–1944), painter and printmaker
- Sonny Boy Williamson (disambiguation), several people
- Stephen F. Williamson, United States Naval Officer
- Thomas Williamson (disambiguation)
- Tim Williamson (racing driver) (1956–1980)
- Timothy Williamson (born 1955), British philosopher
- Troy Williamson (born 1983), American football wide receiver
- Troy Williamson (boxer) (born 1991), British boxer
- Walter Williamson (disambiguation)
- William Williamson (disambiguation), several people
- Zion Williamson (born 2000), American basketball player

== See also ==
- Allen Williamson Bridge, road bridge in Payne County, Oklahoma
- Wilhelms, Wilhelmsen, Wilhelmson, Wilhelmsson
- Willem, Willems, Willemse, Willemsen, Willemsens, Willemszoon
- Williams (list), Williamson, Wilson (list), Willson, Willyams
