= Willem =

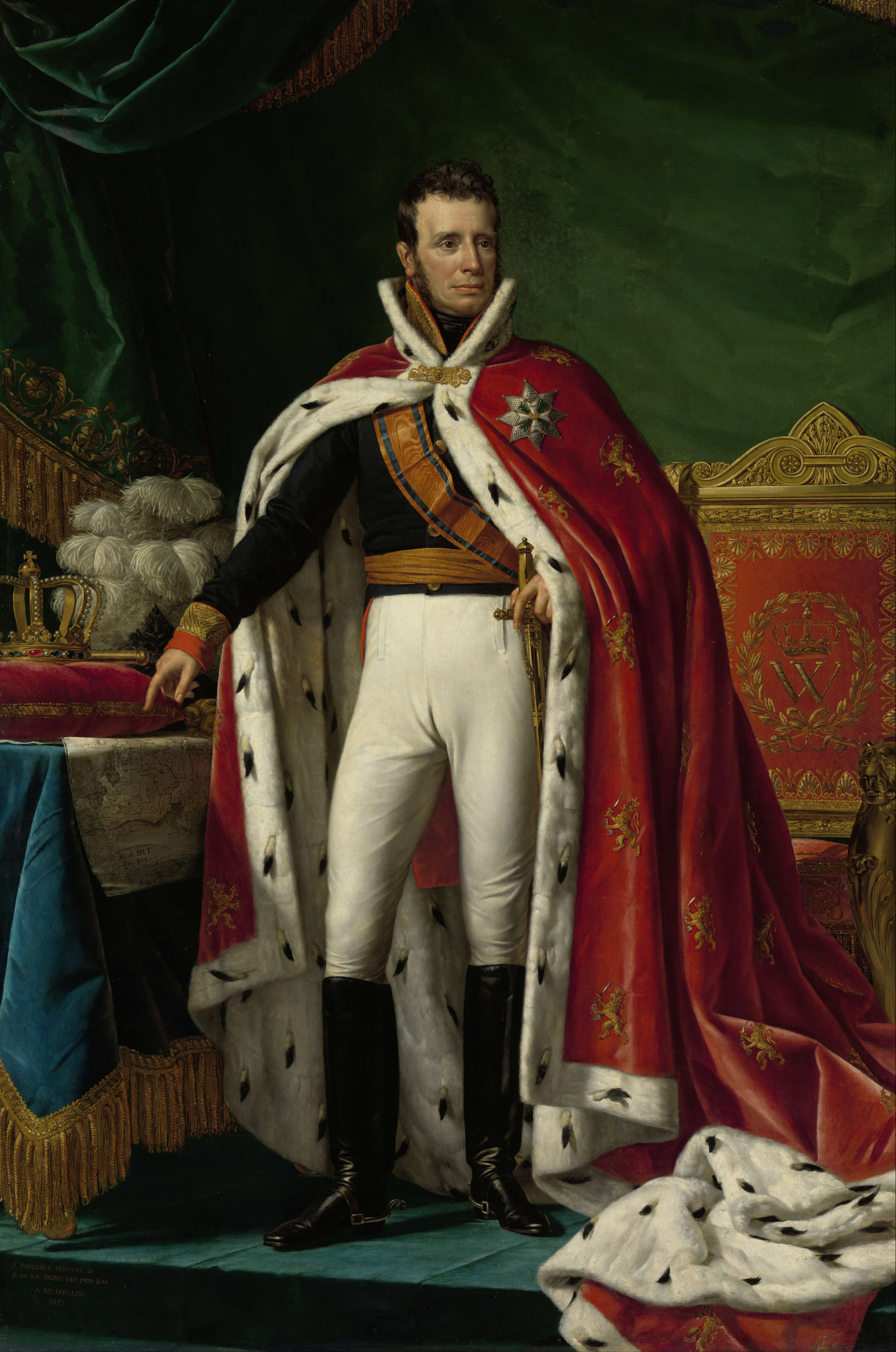
- King Willem I of the Netherlands in 1819. Willem is the given and regnal name of the first three kings of the Netherlands.
- Pronunciation: Dutch: [ˈʋɪləm] Afrikaans: [ˈvələm]
- Gender: Male
- Language: Dutch

Other gender
- Feminine: Willemina, Willemijn

Origin
- Language: Germanic
- Meaning: Vehement protector
- Region of origin: Belgium, Netherlands

Other names
- Variant forms: Guillaume, Wilhelm, Wilhelmus, William
- Nicknames: Jelle, Pim, Willie, Willy, Wim
- Derived: Wil (will) + helm (helmet, protection)
- Related names: Wilhelmina, Willems
- Popularity: see popular names

Willem (Dutch pronunciation: [ˈʋɪləm]) is a Dutch and West Frisian masculine given name. The name is Germanic, and can be seen as the Dutch equivalent of the name William in English, Guillaume in French, Guilherme in Portuguese, Guillermo in Spanish and Wilhelm in German. Nicknames that are derived from Willem are Jelle, Pim, Willie, Willy and Wim.

== Given name ==
- Willem I (1772–1843), King of the Netherlands
- Willem II (1792–1849), King of the Netherlands
- Willem III (1817–1890), King of the Netherlands
- Willem of the Netherlands (1840–1879), Dutch prince
- Willem-Alexander (b. 1967), King of the Netherlands
- Willem Aantjes (1923–2015), Dutch politician
- Willem Adelaar (b. 1948), Dutch linguist
- Willem Andriessen (1887–1964), Dutch pianist and composer
- Willem Arondeus (1894–1943), Dutch artist and author, WWII Resistance member
- Willem Barentsz (ca. 1550–1597), Dutch navigator and explorer
- Willem Victor Bartholomeus (1825–1892), Dutch organist and conductor
- Willem Bilderdijk (1756–1831), Dutch poet
- Willem Blaeu (1571–1638), Dutch cartographer, atlas maker, and publisher
- Willem Boy (1520–1592), Flemish painter, sculptor, and architect
- Willem Breuker (1944–2010), Dutch jazz bandleader, composer, arranger, and musician
- Willem Brouwer (b. 1963), Dutch football (soccer) player
- Willem Buiter (b. 1949), economist of the Bank of England's Monetary Policy Committee
- Willem Claesz. Heda (1594–ca. 1680), Dutch Golden Age still-life artist
- Willem Cornelisz Schouten (ca. 1567–1625), a Dutch navigator of the Dutch East India Company
- Willem de Kooning (1904–1997), Dutch-American abstract expressionist painter
- Willem de Rooij (b. 1969), Dutch artist
- Willem de Sitter (1872–1934), Dutch mathematician, physicist and astronomer
- Willem de Vlamingh (1640–ca. 1698), Dutch sea captain and explorer of Australia
- Willem Dafoe (real name is William) (b. 1955), American actor
- Willem Drees (1886–1988), Dutch politician
- Willem Drost (1633–1659), Dutch Golden Age painter and printmaker
- Willem Einthoven (1860–1927), Dutch doctor, physiologist, and inventor of the electrocardiogram
- Willem Elsschot (1882–1960), Flemish writer and poet (pseudonym of Alfons-Jozef De Ridder)
- Willem Endstra (1953–2004), Dutch real estate trader
- Willem Frederik Hermans (1921–1995), Dutch author
- Willem Holleeder (b. 1958), Dutch criminal involved in the kidnapping of Heineken president Freddy Heineken
- Willem Hondius or Willem Hondt (1598–ca. 1652), a Dutch engraver, cartographer and painter
- Willem Hubert van Blijenburgh (1881–1936), a Dutch Olympic fencer
- Willem Jacob Luyten (1899–1994), Dutch-American astronomer
- Willem Jacob 's Gravesande (1688–1742), Dutch philosopher and mathematician
- Willem Janssen (footballer, born 1880), Dutch footballer
- Willem Janssen (footballer, born 1986), Dutch footballer
- Willem Janszoon (ca. 1570–1630), Dutch navigator and colonial governor
- Willem Jewett (1963-2022), American lawyer and politician
- Willem Johan Kolff (1911–2009), Dutch-American inventor of the artificial kidney
- Willem Kes (1856–1934), Dutch conductor and violinist
- Willem Kalf (1619–1693), Dutch Golden Age painter, art dealer, and appraiser
- Willem Kieft (1597–1647), Dutch merchant and director-general of New Netherland
- Willem Kloos (1859–1938), Dutch poet and literary critic
- Willem Konjore (1945–2021), Namibian politician
- Willem Maris (1844–1910), Dutch landscape painter
- Willem Meijer (1923–2003), Dutch botanist and plant collector
- Willem Mengelberg (1871–1951), Dutch conductor
- Willem Mons (1688–1724), brother of Peter the Great's mistress Anna Mons and secretary to Catherine
- Willem Oltmans (1925–2004), Dutch journalist
- Willem van der Oord, Dutch hydraulic engineer
- Willem Pieterszoon Buytewech (1591—1624), Dutch painter, draughtsman, and etcher
- Willem Pijper (1894–1947), Dutch composer, music critic, and music teacher
- Willem Rebergen (born 1985), Dutch DJ and producer
- Willem Ritstier (born 1959), Dutch cartoonist
- Willem Roelofs (1822–1897), Dutch painter, water-colourist, etcher, lithographer and draughtsman
- Willem Sandberg (1897–1984), Dutch typographer and museum curator
- Willem Sassen (1918–2002), Dutch Nazi collaborator, Waffen-SS officer and journalist
- Willem Siebenhaar (1863–1936), Dutch-Australian social activist and writer
- Willem Surenhuis (ca. 1664–1729), Dutch Christian scholar
- Willem Usselincx (1567–1647), Flemish merchant, investor and diplomat
- Willem Tumpal Pandapotan Simarmata (1954–2022), an Indonesian politician
- Willem van Aelst (1627–1683), Dutch still-life artist
- Willem van Biljon (b. 1961), South African entrepreneur and technologist
- Willem van de Velde the Elder (ca. 1611–1693), Dutch painter
- Willem van de Velde the Younger (1633–1707), Dutch marine painter, son of above
- Willem van Hanegem (b. 1944), Dutch football player and coach
- Willem van Hanegem Jr. (b. 1988), Dutch EDM producer and DJ, half of W&W, son of Willem van Hanegem
- Willem van Mieris (1662–1747), Dutch painter
- Willem van Otterloo (1907–1978), Dutch conductor, cellist and composer
- Willem Verhulst (ca. 1625), the second director of the Dutch West India Company
- Willem Verstegen (ca. 1612—1659), merchant of the Dutch East India Company and chief of factory in Deshima
- Willem Willink (1750–1841), Dutch merchant
- Willem Wilmink (1936–2003), Dutch poet and writer
- Willem Wissing (1656–1687), Dutch portrait artist
- Willem Witsen (1860–1923), Dutch painter and photographer
- Willem Zwalve (b. 1949), Dutch legal historian

=== Middle name ===
- Evert Willem Beth (1908–1964), Dutch philosopher and logician
- Pieter Willem Botha (1916–2006), former prime minister and president of South Africa
- Schalk Willem Burger (1852–1918), South African military leader, lawyer, and statesman
- Herman Willem Daendels (1762–1818), 36th Governor General of the Dutch East Indies
- Bernard Willem Holtrop (b. 1941), Dutch cartoonist who uses Willem as his professional name
- Jan Willem Janssens (1762–1838), Dutch nobleman, soldier and statesman
- Frederik Willem de Klerk (1936–2021), State President of South Africa
- Pieter Willem Korthals (1807–1892), Dutch botanist
- Hendrik Willem Lenstra, Jr. (b. 1949), Dutch mathematician
- Hendrik Willem van Loon (1882–1944), Dutch-American historian and journalist
- Vincent Willem Van Gogh, Dutch post-impressionist painter
- Dale Willem Steyn, South African cricketer

== Surname ==
- Christophe Willem, contemporary French singer
- Jean-Pierre Willem, founder of Medecins Aux Pieds Nus translatable as Barefoot Doctors

== See also ==
- Willeke, a related Dutch feminine given name
- Wilhelm, Wilhelms, Wilhelmsen, Wilhelmson, Wilhelmsson
- Willem, Willems, Willemse, Willemsen, Willemsens, Willemszoon
- William, Williams (list), Williamson, Wilson (list), Willson, Willyams
