= Jelle =

- Gender: male

Origin
- Origin: multiple

Jelle is a Dutch male given name, rarely also given to women.

The origin of the name lies in Friesland, although the name is quite commonly used throughout the Netherlands and Flanders. The name comes from the Dutch word "geld", more probable the Frisian word "jild", meaning "money", "value", "payment", "revenge", or "festival of sacrifice". In the southern Netherlands, Jelle is also an abbreviation for Willem.

== People ==
- Jelle Bakker (born 1983), Dutch YouTuber and artist
- Jelle van Vucht (born 1996), Dutch YouTuber
- Jelle De Beule (born 1980), Belgian comedian
- Jelle De Bock (born 1988), Belgian football player
- Jelle Taeke de Boer (1908–1970), Dutch art collector
- Jelle Faber (1924–2004), Canadian theologian
- Jelle Florizoone (born 1995), Belgian actor
- Jelle Goes (born 1970), Dutch football manager
- Jelle Klaasen (born 1984), Dutch darts player
- Jelle Nijdam (born 1963), Dutch cyclist
- Jelle Reyners (1600–1634), Dutch painter
- Jelle ten Rouwelaar (born 1980), Dutch football player
- Jelle Van Dael (born 1990), Belgian singer
- Jelle Van Damme (born 1983), Belgian football player
- Jelle van Gorkom (born 1991), Dutch cyclist
- Jelle van Kruijssen (born 1989), Dutch football player
- Jelle Vanendert (born 1985), Belgian cyclist
- Jelle Vossen (born 1989), Belgian football player
- Jelle Wagenaar (born 1989), Dutch football player
- Jelle Wallays (born 1989), Belgian cyclist
- Jelle Zijlstra (1918–2001), Dutch politician and Prime Minister
