= Willyams =

Willyams is a surname. Notable people with this name include:

- Cooper Willyams (1762–1816), British clergyman and artist
- Edward Brydges Willyams (1834–1916), British member of parliament
- Humphrey Willyams (1792–1872), British politician
- Jane Louisa Willyams (1786–1878), British novelist and historian
- Sarah Brydges Willyams (by 1783–1863), confidante of Benjamin Disraeli

== See also ==
- Wilhelms, Wilhelmsen, Wilhelmson, Wilhelmsson
- Willem, Willems, Willemse, Willemsen, Willemsens, Willemszoon
- Williams (list), Williamson, Wilson (list), Willson, Willyams
