= Willems =

Willems is a patronymic surname of Dutch origin, equivalent to Williams. In 2008, it was the 6th most common surname in Belgium (18,604 people) and in 2007 it was the 39th most common surname in the Netherlands (17,042 people)..

== People with this surname ==
- Creed Willems (born 2003), American baseball player
- Daniel Willems (1956–2016), Belgian road cyclist
- Dirk Willems (died 1569), Dutch anabaptist martyr
- Edgar Willems (1890–1978), Belgian artist and musician
- Eddy Willems (born 1962), Belgian security expert
- Emilio Willems (1905–1997), German-American sociologist and ethnologist
- Florent Joseph Marie Willems (1823–1905), Belgian painter
- Frederik Willems (born 1979), Belgian road cyclist
- Gerard Willems (born 1946), Dutch-born Australian pianist
- Gladys Willems (born 1977), Belgian archer
- Hans Willems (born 1934), Dutch Olympic sailor
- Henri Willems (1899–?), Belgian bobsledder
- Jan Willems a.k.a. Yankey Willems (died 1688), Dutch buccaneer
- Jan Camiel Willems (1939–2013), Belgian mathematician
- Jan Frans Willems (1793–1846), Flemish writer
- Jean-Pierre Willems (1886–?), Belgian fencer
- Jennifer Willems (1947–2015), Dutch actress
- Jeroen Willems (1962–2012), Dutch actor and singer
- Jetro Willems (born 1994), Dutch footballer
- Jo Willems (born 1970), Belgian cinematographer
- Ko Willems (1900–1983), Dutch track cyclist
- Louis Willems (1822–1907), Belgian physician and bacteriologist
- Ludwig Willems (born 1966), Belgian road cyclist
- Maurice Willems (born 1929), Belgian footballer
- Menno Willems (born 1977), Dutch footballer
- Michael Willems (born 1959), Dutch/Canadian Photographer
- Mo Willems (born 1968), American writer, animator, author and illustrator
- Nathan Willems (born c.1981), American politician in Iowa
- Patrick H. Willems (born 1987), American video essayist and filmmaker
- Paul Willems (1912–1997), Belgian novelist and playwright
- Pierre Willems (1840–1898), Dutch philologist and historian of Ancient Rome
- Rein Willems (born 1945), Dutch businessman
- Ron Willems (born 1966), Dutch footballer
- Sandrine Willems (born 1968), Belgian writer and documentary maker
- Steeven Willems (born 1990), French footballer
- Theo Willems (1891–1960), Dutch archer
- Thom Willems (born 1955), Dutch composer
- Ton Willems (born 1954), Duch sculptor
- Victor Willems (1877–1918), Belgian fencer
- Willem J. H. Willems (1950–2014), Dutch archaeologist
- Harry Willems (born 1999), Australian Accountant

== See also ==
- Willems, Nord, a commune of France
- Wilhelms, Wilhelmsen, Wilhelmson, Wilhelmsson
- Willems, Willemse, Willemsen, Willemsens, Willemszoon
- Williams, Williamson, Wilson (list), Willson, Willyams
