= Willson (name) =

Origin
- Origin: William, from Old German
- Meaning: "son of Will"
- Region of origin: England

Other names
- Variant form: Wilson

Willson is an English language patronymic surname, literally "son of William" (William an old Old German name). There are other spellings, such as the more common Wilson variant. Willson is less common as a given name. Willson may refer to:

== Surname ==
- Alan N. Willson, Jr. (born 1939), American electrical engineer
- Alice Willson (1889–1980), First Lady of North Carolina
- Augustus E. Willson (1846–1931), American politician
- Bob Willson (1928–2019), Canadian broadcaster
- Brian Willson (born 1941), American Vietnam War veteran and activist
- Chloe Clark Willson (1818–1874), American teacher in the territory that became Oregon
- Crowell Willson (1815–1894), Canadian farmer and politician
- Crowell Willson (Upper Canada) (1762–1832), Canadian farmer and politician
- David Willson (1778–1866), religious leader and mystic
- David Harris Willson (1901–1973), American historian and professor
- Diddie Willson (1911–1961), American football player
- Forceythe Willson (1837–1867), American poet
- Fred F. Willson (1877–1956), American architect
- Henry Willson (1911–1978), American talent agent
- James C. Willson (1833–1912), Canadian-born Michigan politician
- John Willson (politician) (1776–1860), Canadian judge and politician
- Laurel Rose Willson (1941–2002), American whose claims of Satanic ritual abuse were a hoax
- Lester S. Willson (1839–1919), Civil War (U.S.) officer and Bozeman, Montana merchant
- Luke Willson (born 1990), American Football player
- Maria Willson, British singer
- Marty Willson-Piper (born 1958), guitarist and member of Australian independent rock band The Church
- Meredith Willson (1902–1984), American composer, playwright
- Michael Willson (born 1963), British actor
- Paul Willson (born 1945), American actor
- Quentin Willson (1957–2025), British TV presenter and motoring expert
- Robert Willson (disambiguation), one of several people
- Russell Willson (1883–1948), American vice admiral, inventor of the Naval Cipher Box
- Simon Willson, Hong Kong radio producer, DJ, actor
- Stephen Clarke-Willson, American video game and software expert
- Thomas Willson (1860–1915), Canadian inventor
- William H. Willson (1805–1856), American politician
- William Willson (businessman) (1927–2003), chairman of Aston Martin (1972–1975)

== Given name or nickname ==
- Willson Contreras (born 1992), Venezuelan baseball player
- Willson Osborne (1906–1979), American composer
- Willson Woodside (1905–1991), Canadian journalist

== See also ==
- Willson (disambiguation)
- Wilson (disambiguation)
- Wilhelm, Wilhelms, Wilhelmsen, Wilhelmson, Wilhelmsson
- Willem, Willems, Willemse, Willemsen, Willemsens, Willemszoon
- William, Williams (list), Williamson, Wilson (list), Willson, Willyams
