= Renée van Wegberg =

Dutch singer and actress (born 1984)

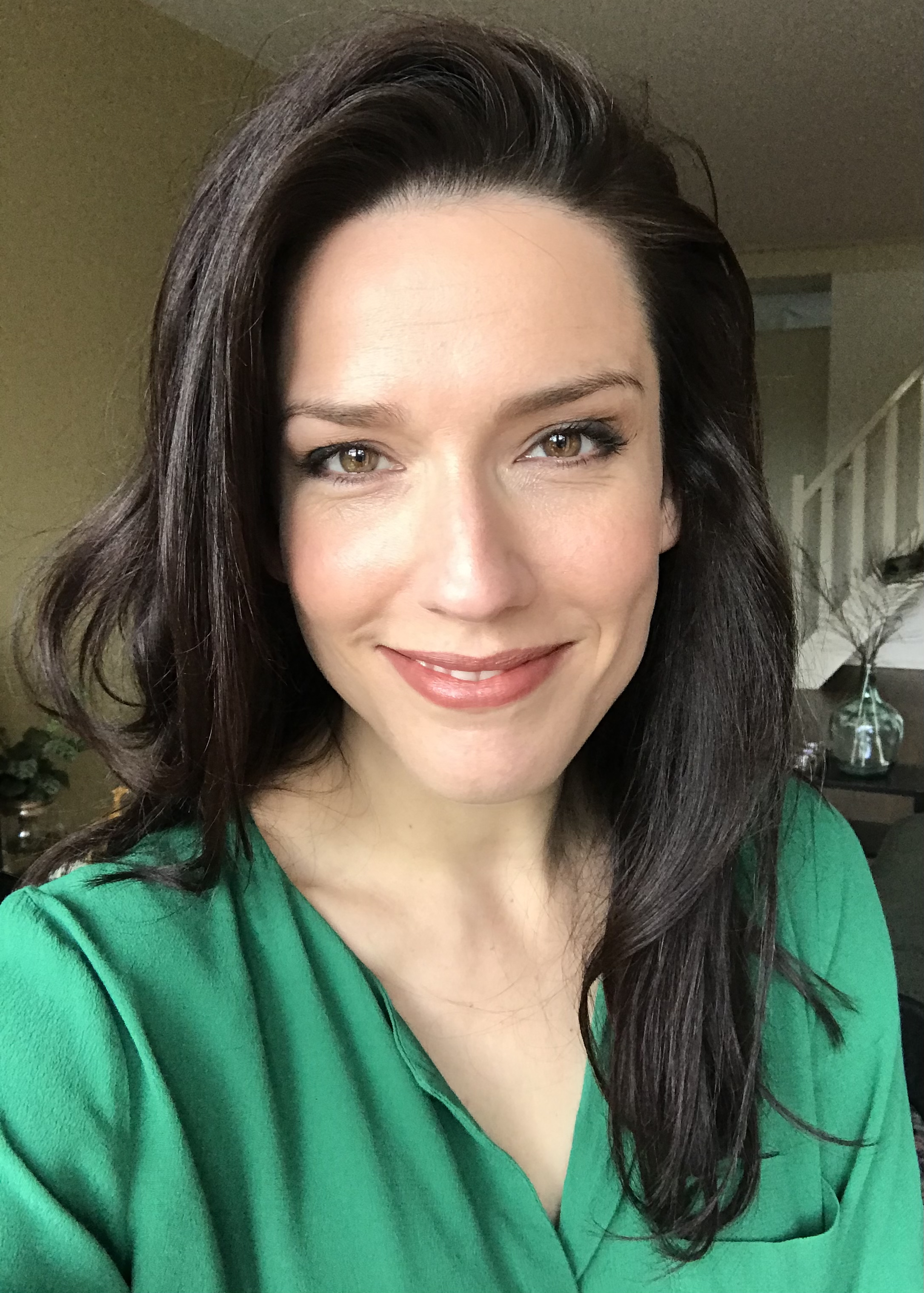
- Renée van Wegberg (2020)

Background information
- Born: Renée Elisabeth Johanna van Wegberg; 14 October 1984 (age 41); Horst, Netherlands
- Genres: Musical theatre; pop
- Occupations: Singer; actress; theatre director; voice actress
- Years active: 2000–present

Renée Elisabeth Johanna van Wegberg (born 14 October 1984) is a Dutch singer, (musical and voice) actress, and theatre producer, best known for her portrayal of Liesbeth List in the musical of the same name about List’s life. Other roles in theatre productions include Alison Bechdel in the musical Fun Home, Elphaba, in the musical Wicked, the Narrator in Joseph and the Amazing Technicolor Dreamcoat, Lot Kleinhart in the musical Urinetown, and Grace Farrell in the musical Annie.

Since 2015, she has also been touring the Netherlands with various song programmes.

== Early life and education ==
Van Wegberg was born on 14 October 1984 in Horst in the Netherlands. At the age of five she began her ballet training, following the Royal Academy of Dance curriculum.

Later in her childhood she learnt to play the saxophone and the piano. After completing her vwo she studied at the Music Theatre Academy of the Rotterdam Conservatoire Codarts, graduating in June of 2007.

== Career ==
=== 2004–2006: participation in television programmes ===
When she was sixteen, she took part in Henny Huisman’s Soundmixshow as Céline Dion and reached the final.

In December 2004, she won the television programme AVRO’s Sterrenjacht (a talent show for young musical theatre talents), securing the title of “Netherlands’ most versatile talent”, a leading role in a musical production by Joop van den Ende Productions. rk.

=== 2006–present: work in theatre and concerts ===
From 2006 to 2007 van Wegberg appeared in the musical Annie at the Efteling Theatre in the role of Grace Farrell. In 2006, She also appeared as a soloist in Musicals in Ahoy.

From 2 April to 28 September 2008, she was in the ensemble and the understudy for Ozzy in the German version of We Will Rock You. From November 2008 to July 2010, Van Wegberg appeared as the narrator in the musical Joseph and the Amazing Technicolor Dreamcoat, produced by Joop van den Ende Productions. From October 2010, she appeared as Lot Kleinhart in the musical Urinetown. In the touring version of this musical, she took over the role from Noortje Herlaar, who played Lot in 2009.

In August 2011, it was announced that she would be Willemijn Verkaik’s understudy in the musical Wicked at the Circustheater in Scheveningen. She made her debut as Elphaba in November 2011.

In March 2012, van Wegberg appeared in the gala concert “Musical Classics” at Ahoy; she was one of the soloists in this full-length programme at Ahoy Rotterdam. In 2012 and 2013, she appeared in the play The Vagina Monologues.

On 5 November 2012, Van Wegberg took part in a special concert by Scott Alan at the M-lab with Freek Bartels and Willemijn Verkaik. In March 2013, she played the role of Mary Magdalene in the Jesus Christ Superstar concert. In 2013 and 2014 theatre season, she appeared in the play De Man Die Het Wist (The Man Who Knew) and the musical Tick, Tick, …Boom!

In the spring of 2014, van Wegberg, once again, appeared The Vagina Monologues. She then appeared as the writer Erika in Vijftig tinten de parodie. During 2014, van Wegberg appeared in the stage comedy Kinderen geen bezwaar. In 2015, she toured the Netherlands with the French chanson programme Vive la France.

From 2017 to 2018, van Wegberg played the role of Liesbeth List in the musical about her life of the same name. The premiere on 2 October 2017 was preceded by the announcement that Liesbeth List was retiring from public life due to dementia.

In 2018 and 2019, she appeared in the new musical Expeditie Eiland, based on the popular Dutch television programme Expeditie Robinson. She played an erratic positivity guru who runs courses on how to love life. She shared the role with Jelka van Houten.

In 2019, van Wegberg played the lesbian cartoonist Alison Bechdel in the musical Fun Home, based on the graphic novel of the same name in which Bechdel looks back on her childhood, her coming out and her difficult relationship with her father. In the same year, van Wegberg also toured the country with her theatre concert Renée van Wegberg Sings List, Shaffy & Piaf, featuring songs by these three icons. In the 2020/2021 theatre season, she toured with her second one-woman show, the theatre concert Renée van Wegberg Doet De Dames, an ode to the songs of Dutch female singers. In the follow-up to this in 2022, she paid tribute to the Netherlands’ male theatre icons in Hou me vast. In the summer of 2022, she performed in the play De Freule at the open-air theatre in Winterswijk, about the life and death of Judith van Dorth. Renée took on the role of the Lady of Dorth.

In 2023, Renée sang and performed alongside Bettina Holwerda in the theatre concert #PERFECT, which they had written themselves; a show about modern women juggling family, marriage and a career, trying to keep all the balls in the air. Due to its huge success and rave reviews from the press and the public, a revival was staged. In the summers of 2023 and 2024, Renée starred in the lead role of the new Dutch musical Het was Zondag in het Zuiden by Toneelgroep Maastricht, about the 1993 floods in Limburg, featuring music by Rowwen Hèze.

On 7 April 2026 it was announced that van Wegberg would play Céline Dion in a Dutch version of the musical Titanique.

=== 2016–present: voice acting ===
Van Wegberg lent her voice Sina in the films Moana (2016) and Moana 2 (2024), Queen Iduna in the film Frozen II (2019), Virana in the 2021 film Raya and the Last Dragon, Z in the 2022 film The Ice Age Adventures of Buck Wild, Dorota in Star Wars: Visions (2023), as well as the Evil Queen in Snow White (2025).

She also voiced roles in Paw Patrol and Barbie’s Dreamhouse.

== Awards and nominations ==
In 2018, Van Wegberg won the Musical Award for ‘Best Female Lead’ for her portrayal of Liesbeth List in the musical of the same name about the singer’s life. Her role as Alison Bechdel in the musical Fun Home earned her a second Musical Award for ‘Best Female Lead’ in 2020.

== Personal life ==
Van Wegberg is married to musician Berry Janssen; they have a son together. She was previously married to actor Rutger Le Poole; she also has a son from that marriage.
