= Willemsen =

Willemsen may refer to:

- August Willemsen (1936–2007), Dutch translator of Portuguese and Brazilian literature
- Daniël Willemsen (born 1975), Dutch sidecarcross rider and nine times World Champion
- Elfje Willemsen (born 1985), Belgian bobsledder who has competed since 2007
- Madeline Willemsen (1915–1982), Puerto Rican actress and comedian
- Marcel Willemsen (born 1977), Dutch sidecarcross passenger and 1999 World Champion
- Mike Willemsen (born 1996), Dutch DJ, record producer, musician
- Roger Willemsen (1955–2016), German author, essayist and TV presenter

== See also ==
- Wilhelms, Wilhelmsen, Wilhelmson, Wilhelmsson
- Willem, Willems, Willemse, Willemsen, Willemsens, Willemszoon
- Williams, Williamson, Wilson (list), Willson, Willyams
