= Willemsens =

Willemsens may refer to:

- Abraham Willemsens (c. 1605–1610–1672), a Flemish painter
- Alfredo Willemsens (1907–1990), a Brazilian footballer
- Lodewijk Willemsens (1630–1702), a Flemish sculptor

== See also ==
- Wilhelms, Wilhelmsen, Wilhelmson, Wilhelmsson
- Willem, Willems, Willemse, Willemsen, Willemsens, Willemszoon
- Williams, Williamson, Wilson (list), Willson, Willyams
