= Willemszoon =

Dutch patronymic

Willemszoon, Willemsz, or Wzn is a Dutch patronymic meaning "son of Willem". Notable people with the patronymic include:

- Debby Willemsz (born 1994), Dutch water polo player
- Gerhardus Knuttel Wzn (1889–1968), Dutch art historian and director of the City Museum in The Hague
- Gerhard J.D. Aalders H. Wzn (1914–1987), Dutch professor of ancient history, member of the Royal Netherlands Academy of Sciences
- Gerret Willemsz. Heda, Dutch Golden Age painter
- Gerrit Willemsz Horst, Dutch Golden Age painter
- Jacob de Vos Willemsz (1774–1844), Dutch poet, art collector, illustrator
- Jacob Willemszoon de Wet, Dutch Golden Age painter
- Jacob Willemsz Delff (died 1601), Dutch painter
- Jan Willemsz Lapp, Dutch Golden Age landscape painter
- Jan Willemsz. van der Wilde, Dutch Golden Age painter
- Lieven Willemsz van Coppenol
- Paulus Willemsz van Vianen, or Paul van Vianen, Dutch silversmith, medallist and sculptor
- Pieter Willemsz Verhoeff (c. 1573–1609), Dutch admiral
- Jacob Willemsz Delff the Younger (1619–1661), Dutch Golden Age portrait painter

== See also ==
- Wilhelms, Wilhelmsen, Wilhelmson, Wilhelmsson
- Willems, Willemse, Willemsen,Willemsens,Willemszoon
- Williams, Williamson, Wilson (list), Willson, Willyams
