= Harold Williamson =

Harold Williamson may refer to

- Harold Williamson (journalist) (1922–2001), British journalist
- Harold F. Williamson (1901–1989), American business historian
- Harold Sandys Williamson (1892–1978), British artist
- Harold Williamson (British artist) (1898–1972)

== See also ==
- Williamson (surname)
