= Willemijn =

- Pronunciation: Dutch: [ʋɪləˈmɛin]
- Gender: Feminine
- Language: Dutch

Other gender
- Masculine: Willem

Origin
- Language: Germanic
- Meaning: "Strong helmet", "willful protector"

Other names
- Variant form: Willemijntje
- Related names: Willemina; Wilhelimina

Willemijn is a Dutch feminine given name. The name originated as a feminine form of the masculine Willem, which is the Dutch version of the Germanic name Wilhelm. Wilhelm can be literally translated as wil meaning "willful" or "strong" and helm meaning "helmet", and is often interpreted as meaning "fierce helmet" or "fierce protector". The name is most common in the Netherlands but is also present in other Dutch-speaking countries, or countries with Dutch populations or heritage.

== Notable people ==
- Willemijn Aerdts (born 1983), Dutch politician
- Willemijn Bos (Born 1988), Dutch field hockey defender
- Willemijn Duyster (Born 1970), Dutch field hockey defender and Olympic medalist
- Willemijn Fock (1942-2021), Dutch art historian
- Willemijn Karsten (born 1986), Dutch handball player
- Willemijn Mulder (born 2000), Dutch rower
- Willemijn Posthumus-van der Goot (1897-1989), Dutch economist
- Willemijn Verkaik (Born 1975), Dutch singer and actress
- Willemijn Verloop (Born 1970), Dutch peace activist and founder of War Child
- Willemijn Waal (born 1975), Dutch Hittitologist

== See also ==
- Willem
