= Wilhelmson =

Wilhelmson is a surname. Notable people with the surname include:

- Carl Wilhelmson (1866–1928), Swedish painter, graphic artist, amateur photographer, and art teacher
- Karin Wilhelmson (1933–2018), Swedish journalist and radio producer

== See also ==
- Wilhelms, Wilhelmsen, Wilhelmson, Wilhelmsson
- Willems, Willemse, Willemsen, Willemsens, Willemszoon
- Williams, Williamson, Wilson (list), Willson, Willyams
