= Wilhelms =

Wilhelms is a surname. Notable people with the surname include:

- Carl Wilhelms (1889–1953), Finnish artist
- Don Wilhelms (born 1930), American geologist, namesake of minor planet 4826 Wilhelms
- Einar Wilhelms (1895–1978), Norwegian footballer
- Eino Wilhelms (1918–2010), Finnish theologian
- Gary Wilhelms (born 1938), American politician
- Jane Wilhelms (died 2005), American biologist and computer scientist
- Jenny Wilhelms (born 1974), Finnish musician
- Manfred Wilhelms, German cinematographer
- Ralf Wilhelms (born 1962), German footballer
- Thorsten Wilhelms (born 1969), German cyclist

== See also ==
- Wilhelms, Wilhelmsen, Wilhelmson, Wilhelmsson
- Willems, Willemse, Willemsen, Willemsens, Willemszoon
- Williams, Williamson, Wilson (list), Willson, Willyams
