= Willemse =

Willemse is a Dutch patronymic surname (Willem's son), equivalent to English Williams and Williamson. Notable people with the surname include:

- Ashwin Willemse (born 1981), South African rugby player
- Bjorn Willemse (born 1983), Dutch ice hockey player
- Cornelius Willemse (1871–1942), Dutch-born New York policeman
- Damian Willemse (born 1998), South African rugby player
- Hein Willemse (born 1957), South African literary critic and poet
- Herman Willemse (1934–2021), Dutch marathon swimmer
- Laurance Willemse (born 1962), South African cricket umpire
- Laurien Willemse (born 1962) Dutch field hockey player
- Mike Willemse (born 1993), South African rugby player
- Nathaniel Willemse (born 1985), South African-born Australian singer and songwriter
- Paul Willemse (born 1992), South African rugby player
- Stan Willemse (1924–2011), English football defender
- Stefan Willemse (born 1992), South African rugby player

== See also ==
- Wilhelms, Wilhelmsen, Wilhelmson, Wilhelmsson
- Willem, Willems, Willemse, Willemsen, Willemsens, Willemszoon
- Williams, Williamson, Wilson (list), Willson, Willyams
