= Pim (name) =

- Gender: Male
- Language: Dutch

Origin
- Region of origin: Netherlands, Flanders

Other names
- Related names: Willem, Wim, Willy

Pim is a Dutch masculine given name, which is a diminutive of the name Willem. The name may refer to:

== Given names ==
- Pim Balkestein (born 1987), Dutch football player
- Pim Bekkering (1931–2014), Dutch football player
- Pim van Boetzelaer van Oosterhout (1892–1986), Dutch diplomat and politician
- Pim Bouwman (born 1991), Dutch football player
- Pim Doesburg (1943–2020), Dutch football player
- Pim Fortuyn (1948–2002), Dutch politician
- Pim Jacobs (1934–1996), Dutch jazz pianist
- Pim-Pim Johansson (born 1982), Swedish tennis player
- Pim Jungerius (1933–2023), Dutch physical geographer
- Pim Koopman (1953–2009), Dutch musician
- Pim Levelt (born 1938), Dutch psycholinguist
- Pim van Liemt (born 1964), Dutch cricket umpire and former cricketer
- Pim Lier (1918–2015), Dutch lawyer and jurist
- Pim Ligthart (born 1988), Dutch cyclist
- Pim van Lommel (born 1943), Dutch cardiologist
- Pim van de Meent (1937–2022), Dutch footballer and manager
- Pim Mulier (1865–1954), Dutch sportsperson
- Pim Nieuwenhuis (born 1976), Dutch sailor
- Pim de la Parra (born 1940), Surinamese-Dutch filmmaker
- Pim Rietbroek (born 1942), Dutch handball player and coach
- Pim Ronhaar (born 2001), Dutch cyclo-cross and road cyclist
- Pim Sierks (born 1932), former airline pilot of a hijacked Boeing 707
- Pim Techamuanvivit (RTGS: Phim Techamuanwaiwit (born 1971), Thai chef and restaurateur
- Pim van Strien (born 29 April 1977), Dutch politician
- Pim van Vliet (born 1977), Dutch fund manager
- Pim van Vugt (born 1995), Dutch sailor
- Pim Verbeek (1956–2019), Dutch footballer and manager
- Pim Walenkamp (born 1974), Dutch politician
- Pim Walsma (born 1987), Dutch baseball player

== Fictional characters ==
- Pim Pimling, a character from the television series Smiling Friends
