= Joke de Kruijf =

Dutch actor

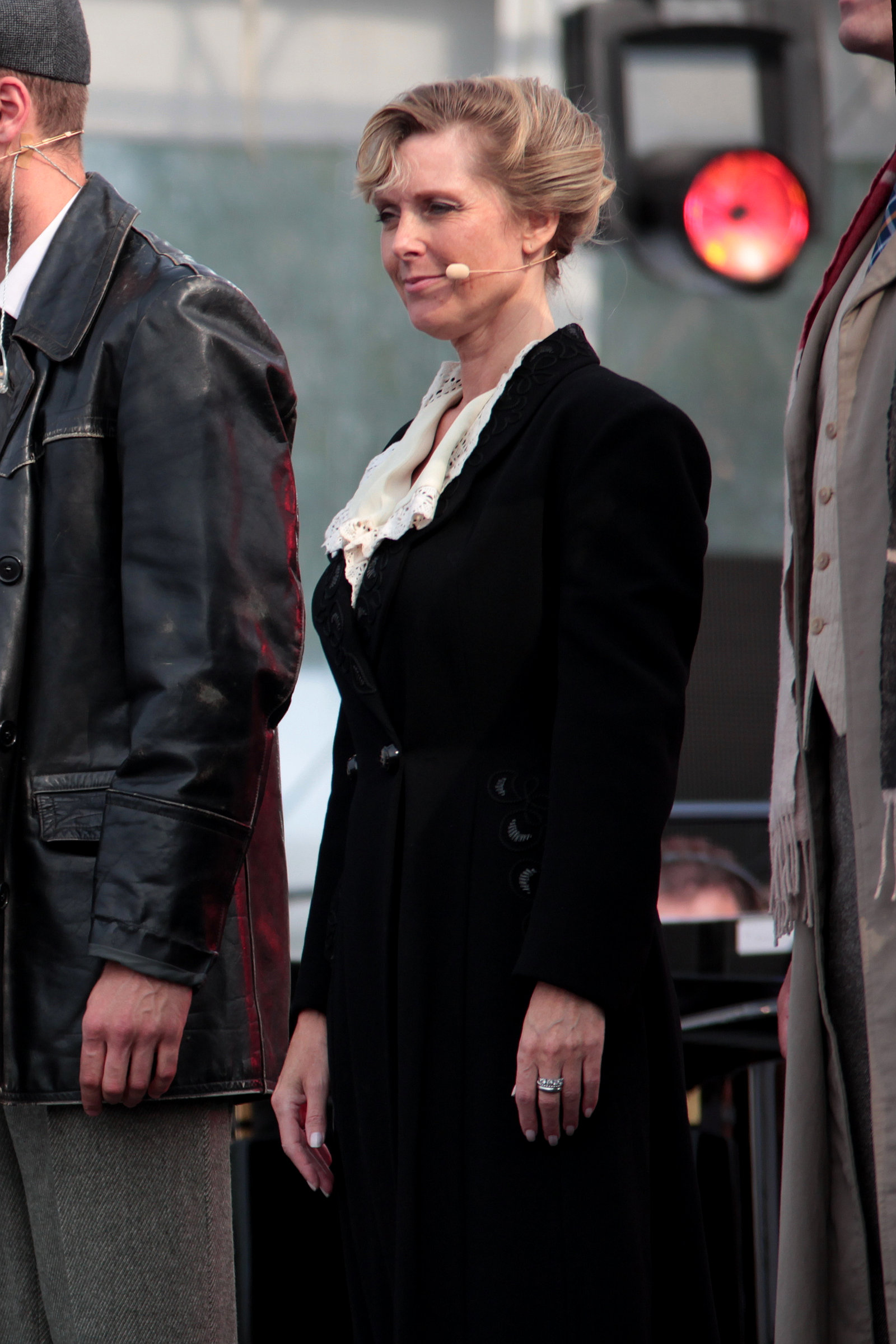
- de Kruijf in 2015
- Born: 22 July 1965 (age 60); Amsterdam, Netherlands
- Occupations: Singer, voice actor

Johanna Maria "Joke" de Kruijf (born 22 July 1965) is a Dutch musical theatre performer, singer, dancer, actress and lyrical soprano, mostly known for her roles in musical theatre and various Dutch dubbings for Walt Disney productions.

== Biography ==
After highschool de Kruijf started the preparatory training for the Academy of Music. After that, she was accepted at the Academy for Kleinkunst (cabaret) and the Nel Roos Academie. She started her career with the musicals Cats and The Phantom of the Opera in Hamburg and Vienna. De Kruijf's first role in the Netherlands was Cosette in Les Misérables. She went on to play the role of Christine Daaé in The Phantom of the Opera in the Netherlands in 1992. She was asked to audition for the Dutch dubbing of Walt Disney's Cinderella and got the part. She subsequently dubbed the Dutch voices for Belle in Beauty and the Beast, Briar Riose/Aurora in Sleeping Beauty and Mary Poppins in Mary Poppins. De Kruijf performed in various concerts, such as Musicals in Ahoy' and the Musical Awards Gala's. She was nominated for a John Kraaijkamp Musical Award 3 times.

== Theater ==
- Jellylorum/Griddlebone in Cats (Hamburg) (1986)
- Christine Daaé in The Phantom of the Opera (Hamburg, Wenen) (1990–1992)
- Cosette in Les Misérables (Amsterdam/Scheveningen) (1991)
- Christine Daaé in The Phantom of the Opera (Scheveningen) (1992–1994)
- Willeke in Willeke (1995)
- Michaela in Carmen (1995)
- Carlie in Carlie (1996)
- Daisy in Larry, this funny world (1997–1998)
- Soloist Een Zonnebloem van Goud (1999)
- 5 different roles in Tango de valentino (2000)
- Audrey in Little Shop of Horrors (2000–2001)
- Grace in Grace (2001–2002)
- Dorothy in Rocky Over The Rainbow (2002–2003)
- Lena Bloem in 'T Schaep met de Vijf Pooten (2003)
- Telkens weer het dorp (2003–2004)
- Polly Baker in Crazy for You (2004)
- Soloist Palazzo (2005)
- Florence in Chess (2006–2007)
- Musicals in Ahoy' (2002, 2004, 2006)
- Singer "Palazzo" (2007)
- Singer "Musicals to the Max" (2007–2008)
- Singer "De Huuder" (2008–2009)
- Velma Kelly in Chicago (2009–2010)
- Neeltje Sturm-Barentse in 1953 de musical (2010–2011)
- Mother in Kerstwens de musical (2011)
- Singer in "Musical Classics in Ahoy" (2012)
- Singer "Witches of Eastwick" (2012)
- Singer in "Nederland Musicalland"(2013)
- Mother of Hannie Schaft in Het meisje met het rode haar (2015–2016)
- Saskia in liften (2018)

== Dutch Dubbings ==
- Assepoester as Assepoester (1992)
- Belle en het Beest as Belle (1992)
- Doornroosje as Briar Rose/Princess Aurora (1995)
- Mary Poppins as Mary Poppins (1999)
- Belle en het Beest: Een Betoverd Kerstfeest as Belle (1997)
- Belle en het Beest: Belle's Wonderlijke Verhalen as Belle (1998)
- Mickey's Kerst Magie as Belle and Assepoester (2001)
- Disney Princess Betoverde Verhalen: Volg Je Dromen as Princess Aurora (2007)
- Space Chimps as Kilowat (2009)
- Max en Ruby as Louise (2011)
- Sofia het prinsesje as Assepoester, Princess Aurora & Belle (2012)
- Ralph Breaks the Internet as Assepoester, Belle & Princess Aurora (2018)
- The Powerpuff Girls' Adventure as Milly Olivia Sylvia Jollyland, Alice, Assepoester, Princess Aurora, Belle, Rainbow Twilight Brite, Rare Twilight Brite, Happy Twilight Brite, Pink Twilight Brite, Purple Twilight Brite, Unicorn Twilight Brite, and Pegasus Unicorn Brite (2021)

== Television ==
In 1996/1997, de Kruijf hosted the RTL 5 show Vegetarisch Kooknieuws together with cook Leo Verdel.
