= Elizabeth Williamson (disambiguation) =

Elizabeth Williamson, is a British pharmacist.

Elizabeth Williamson may also refer to:

- Elizabeth Williamson (journalist), American journalist
- Liz Williamson (1949–2024), Australian textile artist and art educator
