= Wilhelmsen =

Wilhelmsen is a surname. Notable people with the surname include:

- Arne Wilhelmsen (1929–2020), Norwegian businessman
- Frederick Wilhelmsen (1923–1996), American philosopher and professor in the Thomist tradition
- Lars Wilhelmsen (born 1946), Norwegian civil servant
- Thorvald Wilhelmsen (1912–1996), Norwegian long-distance runner, specialized in the 10,000 metres
- Tom Wilhelmsen (born 1983), former Major League Baseball relief pitcher
- Unni Wilhelmsen (born 1971), Norwegian singer, songwriter and musician

== See also ==
- Wallenius Wilhelmsen Logistics, privately owned Norwegian/Swedish shipping company
- Wilh. Wilhelmsen (WWH) is a global maritime industry group, headquartered in Lysaker, Norway
- Wilhelms, Wilhelmsen, Wilhelmson, Wilhelmsson
- Willems, Willemse, Willemsen, Willemsens, Willemszoon
- Williams, Williamson, Wilson (list), Willson, Willyams
