= Henry Williamson (disambiguation) =

Henry Williamson (1895–1977) was a British novelist.

Henry Williamson may also refer to:

- Henry Charles Williamson (1871–1949), Scottish pioneer of marine biology
- Henry Williamson Haynes (1831–1912), American archaeologist
- Henry Williamson Lugard (1813–1857), military engineer and architect
