= Protestant church of Drogeham =

Church in Drogeham, Netherlands

Protestant church of Drogeham Saint Nicholas church
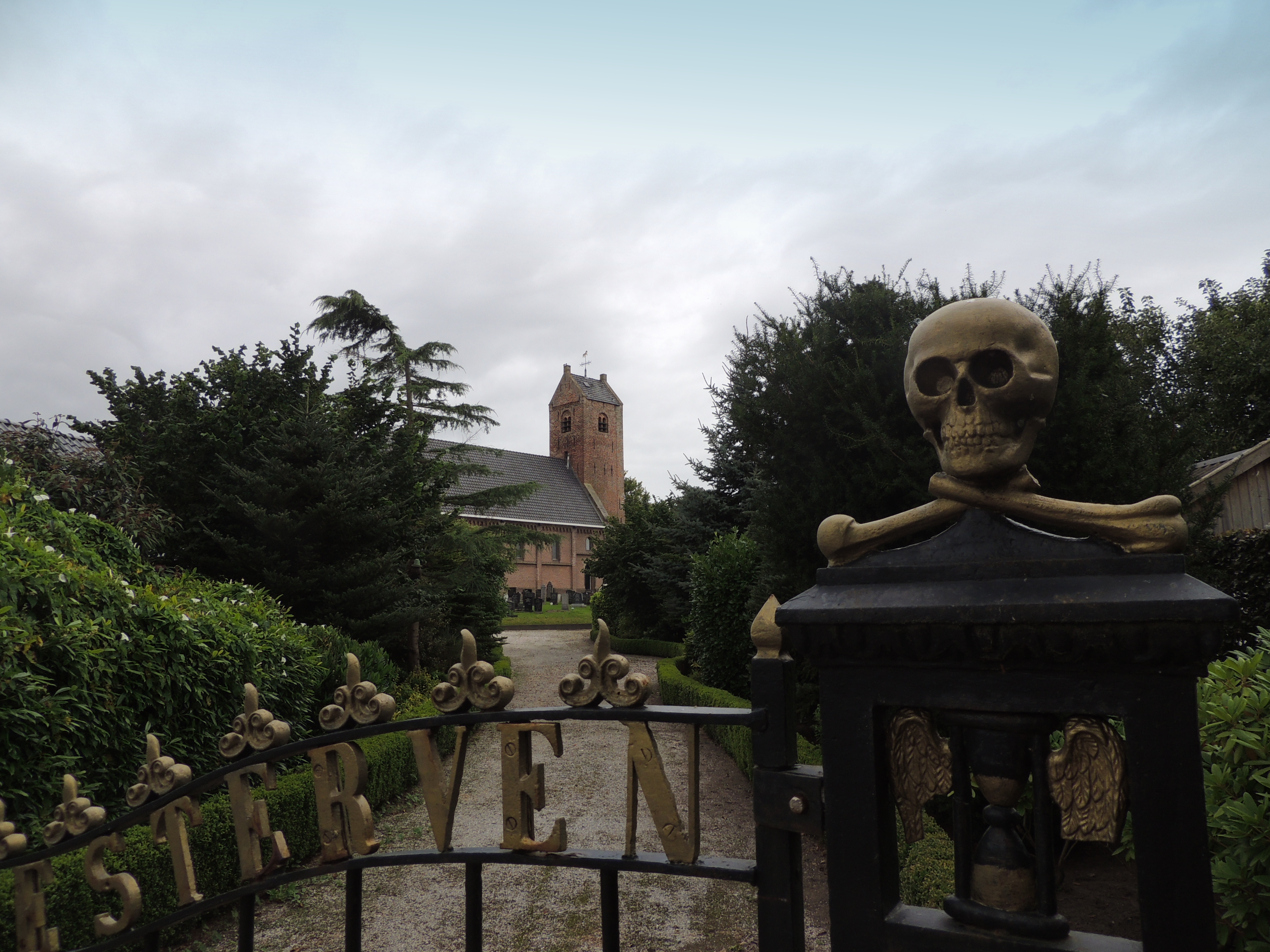
- Church of Drogeham
- Protestant church of Drogeham; Saint Nicholas church
- 53.2023°N 6.1101°E

History
- Dedication: Before the Reformation, to Saint Nicholas

Specifications
- Materials: Brick

The Protestant church of Drogeham or Saint Nicholas church is a church in Drogeham, Netherlands. The current church was built in 1876 on the site of an older church built in the 13th century. The church is built against the 13th-century tower of the old church and on top of the tower it is a gable roof. The old church was a Roman Catholic church dedicated to Saint Nicholas but became a Protestant church after the Protestant Reformation.

The church located on Tsjerkebuorren 4. and is listed as a Rijksmonument, number 7042 and is rated with a very high historical value.
