= Willeke =

Dutch feminine given name

Willeke (Dutch pronunciation: [ˈʋɪləkə]) is a Dutch feminine given name and a surname. The given name may be abbreviated as Wil (Dutch pronunciation: [ˈʋɪl]).

== People named Willeke ==
People with the given name Willeke include:

- Willeke Alberti (born 1945), Dutch singer and actress
- Willeke van Ammelrooy (born 1944), Dutch actress and director
- Willeke Arkema-Knol (born 1991), Dutch racing cyclist
- Willeke van der Weide (born 1965), Dutch road racing cyclist
- Willeke Wendrich (born 1961), Dutch-American Egyptologist and archaeologist

People with the surname Willeke include:

- Christoph Willeke (born 1997), German politician
- Leonard B. Willeke (active 1911–1918), American architect

== See also ==
- Wilhelmina (given name), a related Dutch feminine given name
- Wilma (given name), a related Dutch feminine given name
- Willem, a related Dutch masculine given name
