= Hugh Williamson (disambiguation) =

Hugh Williamson (1735–1819) was an American politician.

Hugh Williamson may also refer to:

- Hugh Ross Williamson (1901–1978), British historian and dramatist
- Hugh D.T. Williamson (1901–1985), Australian banking executive and philanthropist
- Hugh Williamson (book designer) (1918–1992), British book designer and author
- Hugh G. M. Williamson (born 1947), Regius Professor of Hebrew at the University of Oxford
- Hugh Williamson, Europe and Central Asia director at Human Rights Watch.

== See also ==
- Williamson (surname)
