= Williams (surname) =

Surname

- Pronunciation: /ˈwɪljəmz/, /ˈwɪliəmz/

Origin
- Meaning: "William's son"

Williams is a surname of English origin derived from the personal name William and the genitive ending -s. It is also common in Wales, where it represents an anglicization of the Welsh patronymic ap Gwilym.

Williams is the second most common surname in New Zealand, the third most common in Wales and the United States, and the fourth most common in Australia.

== Earliest recorded usage ==
- Willam is from 1279 in Oxfordshire.
- William is from 1299 in Whitby, Yorkshire.
- Williames is from 1307 in Staffordshire.

== See also ==
- List of people with surname Williams
- Williams baronets
- Williams family of Caerhays and Burncoose
- Wilhelm, Wilhelms, Wilhelmsen, Wilhelmson, Wilhelmsson
- Willem, Willems, Willemse, Willemsen, Willemsens, Willemszoon
- William, Williams (list), Williamson, Wilson (list), Willson, Willyams

== Bibliography ==
- Reaney, P. H.; Wilson, R. M. (1995). A Dictionary of English Surnames:The Standard Guide to English Surnames. Oxford University Press. ISBN 0-19-863146-4.
