= Walter Williamson =

Walter or Wally Williamson may refer to:

- Wally Williamson (1907–1965), Australian footballer
- Sir Walter James Franklin Williamson (1867–1954), British civil servant and naturalist
