= Charles Williamson =

Charlie or Charles Williamson may refer to:

- C. N. Williamson (Charles Norris Williamson, 1859–1920), English writer and motoring journalist
- Charles C. Williamson (1877–1965), American library director
- Charlie Williamson (footballer, born 1956), Scottish left-back
- Charlie Williamson (footballer, born 1962), English left-back
- Charles Williamson (rapper) (born 1977), American performer, stage name Guerilla Black

== See also ==
- G. C. Williamson (George Charles Williamson, 1858–1942), English art historian
