= Mark Williamson =

Mark Williamson may refer to:

- Mark Williamson (biologist), British biologist
- Mark Williamson (baseball) (born 1959), retired American baseball player
- Mark Williamson (businessman) (born 1957), British businessman

== See also ==
- Williamson (surname)
