= Jelle Faber =

Dutch-Canadian theologian

The Reverend Jelle Faber
- Born: 12 May 1924; Drogeham, Netherlands
- Died: 30 September 2004 (aged 80); Hamilton, Ontario, Canada

Ecclesiastical career
- Religion: Christianity (Continental Reformed)
- Church: Canadian Reformed Churches

Academic background
- Education: Theological University of the Reformed Churches

Academic work
- Discipline: Theology
- Sub-discipline: Systematic theology
- Institutions: Canadian Reformed Theological Seminary

Jelle Faber (12 May 1924, Drogeham – 30 September 2004, Hamilton, Ontario) was a Dutch-Canadian theologian. After obtaining his Doctor of Theology degree at the Theological University of the Reformed Churches in Kampen at the age of 45, he emigrated to Canada and served as Professor of Dogmatology and Principal of the Canadian Reformed Theological Seminary from 1969 to 1989. In 1989, a Festschrift was published in his honor: Unity and Diversity: Studies Presented to Prof. Dr. Jelle Faber on the Occasion of his Retirement.
