= Simone Kleinsma =

Dutch actress (born 1958)

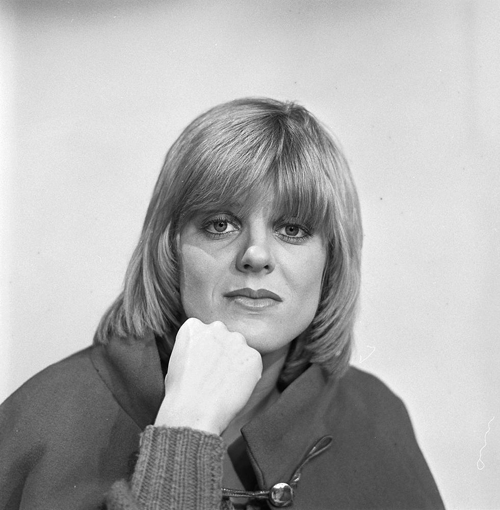
- Simone Kleinsma in 1979
- Born: 8 May 1958 (age 67); Amsterdam, Netherlands
- Occupations: Singer, actress
- Years active: 1979–present
- Television: Kees & Co
- Spouse: Guus Verstraete (m. 1990–2017)

Simone Kleinsma (born 8 May 1958) is a Dutch musical theatre actress.

== Personal life ==
On 5 June 1990, Simone married Guus Verstraete, a Dutch television director.

== Career ==
Simone provided voice over work to numerous major animated films; including The Fairy Godmother in Shrek 2, Yzma in The Emperor's New Groove, Esmé Holgert in Babe and Babe: Pig in the City, Georgette in Oliver and Company and An American Tail.

Kleinsma performed with pianists (most often Cor Bakker or Tony Eyk) or orchestra. As an actress, she became known for her part in the TV-hit series 'Kees & Co' (aired from 1997 to 2006 at RTL Broadcasting). She played Kees Heistee, mother of Anne (Amber Teterissa) and Rudie (Robin Tjon Pian Gi) and married to Ben Heistee (Rik Hoogendoorn).

In 1996–1997 she presented the cooking program 'Koken met Cas'.

She won the 2023 season of The Masked Singer.

== Theater ==
Production/Show	year(s)	role
Niemand weet, niemand Weet, dat ik Repelsteeltje heet	1977–1978	soloist next to Gerard Cox
De Steilewandrace	1978–1979	soloist next to Gerard Cox
Maskerade	1979–1980	Truitje and various other parts
Amerika Amerika	1981–1992	Fanny Jansen
Evenaar	1983–1984	Claartje van Dijk
Publiek	1986–1987	Tet
André van Duin Revue; 100 jaar Carré	1987–1989	A variety of roles next to André van Duin, Frans van Dusschoten & Hans Otjes
Sweet Charity	1989–1991	Charity Hope Valentine
Les Misérables	1991	Madame Thérnadier
Funny Girl	1991–1992	Fanny Brice
Simone & Friends	1992–1993	Variety of roles. With Stanley Burleson, Perry Dossett, Yolanda Germain & Xandra van Saarloos
Sweeney Todd: The Demon Barber of Fleet Street	1993–1994	Mrs. Nellie Lovett
Hoera, we zijn normaal	1996–1997	Soloist next to Anne-Mieke Ruyten, Serge-Henri Valcke, Marjol Flore, Marc Krone & Bas Groenenberg
Joe, de musical	1997	Katie Johnson
Chicago	1999–2001	Roxie Hart
Musicals in Concert	2001–2002	Soloist next to Henk Poort, Danny de Munk/ Rolf Koster, Esther Pierweijer/ Claudia de Graaf
Musicals in Ahoy'- All Star Musical Gala	2002	Soloist
Fosse – Song & Dance Spectacular	2002–2003	Soloist next to Pia Douwes and Stanley Burleson
Mamma Mia!	2003–2005	Donna Sheridan
Musicals in Ahoy' II – Musical Meets Movie	2004	Soloist
Simone Sings Doris Day – In concert (broadcast for television)	2004	Soloist. With Carlo Boszhard, Stanley Burleson, Tony Neef en Cor Bakker
One Flew Over the Cuckoo's Nest	2006	Nurse Mildred Ratched
Aan het Einde van de Regenboog (At the End of the Rainbow)	2007	Judy Garland
Sunset Boulevard	2008–2009	Norma Desmond
Simone Kleinsma: Songs from the Heart	2008 en 2009–2010	Soloist next to Joost de Jong & Daan Wijnands
Sondheim in Songs	2010	Soloist next to Stanley Burleson, Céline Purcell & Freek Bartels
Simone Kleinsma: Songbook	2010–2011	Soloist. With Rolf Koster & Gino Emnes
Next to Normal	2012	Diana
Sister Act	2013	Mother Superior

== Television ==
Program	year(s)	Broadcaster	remark(s)
Voorbij, Voorbij (Televisionfilm)	1979		Part: Guide
Spreuken (songs)	1979		Singer next to Joost Prinsen
De Taalstraat: Ik heb u lief mijn Nederlands	1979–1982	Teleac	Singer with Gerard Cox, Carry Tefsen and Piet Hendriks
Een vlucht regenwulpen (film)	1981		Part: laboratory Janny
Zeg 'ns Aaa	Episode 29, 1982	VARA	Guestpart: Klushulp
Zoals U enst, mevrouw	1984	VARA	Guestpart. Musical comedy with André Hazes, Carry Tefsen, Yvonne Valkenburg en Joost Prinsen
Als ik later groot ben..!	1984	KRO	Musical for children because of Childrenbook week 1984. Part: Teacher (next to Marnix Kappers)
Een avond met André	1985	VARA	Guest. Muzical show rondom André Hazes
Wedden, dat..?	1986–1987	AVRO	Dancer/singer next to Fred Butter, Hans van der Woude & Lucie de Lange. Televisieshow met Jos Brink & Sandra Reemer.
De Ep Oorklep Show	1987	TROS	Variety of different parts with André van Duin, Frans van Dusschoten and Lucie de Lange
Kinderen voor Kinderen 8	1987	VARA	Hostess/singer with Ron Brandsteder
Simone & Friends (televisieshow)	1988		soloist
Simone's Kerstshow	1990	RTL 4	Variety of different parts with André van Duin en Henk Poort
Gouden televizier Ring Gala 1992	1992	AVRO	Guest appearance with Paul de Leeuw (as monsieur and madame Thérnadier)
Mijn dochter en ik	1994	RTL 4	Guestappearance: Cleaning Lady
Vrienden voor het leven	1994	RTL 4	Guest appearance: teacher at pregnancy therapy
Wat schuift 't?	1995	RTL 4	Guest appearance: Chantal (Episode Ingepakt en wegwezen)
30 minuten	1995	VPRO	Guest appearance (Afl. 10: Rondom ons). Program written by and starring Arjan Ederveen
Parodie Parade	1996–1997	RTL 4	Soloist next to Anne-Mieke Ruyten and Robert Paul. Television show with Ron Brandsteder.
Koken met Cas	1996–1997	SBS6	Hostess (Cookingprogramm with chefcook Cas Spijkers)
Baantjer	2002	RTL 4	Guest appearance Annemarie Spijkers/Sandra Kottman (Episode De Cock en het lijk in de kast)
Kees & Co	1997–2006	RTL 4	Main part: Kees Heistee (A remake from 2point4 Children).
Kees & Co	2019–2020	RTL 4	Main part: Kees Heistee (A remake from 2point4 Children).
Villa Felderhof	2001	NCRV	Main guest with André Hazes. Talkshow from and presentes by Rik Felderhof.
Junior Eurovisiesongfestival	2006	AVRO	Juror
In de hoofdrol	2008	AVRO	Central Guest. Hosted by Frits Sissing
Dik Voormekaar Show	2009	TROS	Guest appearance. Television show with André van Duin and Ferry de Groot

== Awards ==
- Pisuisse Award for most promising major student Kleinkunst Academie (1978)
- Academy Award/ Gouden Beelden for Best Comedy actress as Kees Heistee in Kees & Co (1999)
- Golden Harp (2000)
- John Kraaijkamp Musical Award for her part as Donna Stuiveling in the musical Mamma Mia! (2004)
- John Kraaijkamp Musical Award for playing Norma Desmond in the musical Sunset Boulevard (2009)
- John Kraaijkamp Musical Award: Speciale Theater Award for her theater show Simone: Songs from the Heart (2010)
- Nomination John Kraaijkamp Musical Award for Best performance by an actress in a leading role as Roxie Hart in the musical Chicago (2000)
- Nomination John Kraaijkamp Musical Award voor Best performance by an actress in a leading role in Fosse (2003)

=== Albums ===
Title	Year(s)				Remark(s)
Met open ogen	1995	27 January 1996	46	12	
Sunset Boulevard – The Dutch cast album	2010	14 February 2009	18	4	Soundtrack Sunset Boulevard
Simone – Songs from the heart	2010	9 January 2010	28	5	
Simone – Songbook	2010	1 January 2011	24	13	
Simone!	2016				

=== Singles ===
Title	Year(s)				Remark(s)
Vanmorgen vloog ze nog	1988	22 October 1988	16	7	as Tsjechov / with Martine Bijl, Robert Paul & Robert Long / No. 15 in the Single Top 100
Zonder jou	1995	23 December 1995	3	16	with Paul de Leeuw / No. 3 in the Single Top 100
Tweestrijd	1996	20 July 1996	35	3	with Paul de Leeuw / No. 26 in the Single Top 100
Doe een wens	1996	21 December 1996	tip8	-	No. 79 in the Single Top 100
Uiteind'lijk vond ik jou	1997	22 March 1997	tip12	-	with Paul de Leeuw / No. 72 in the Single Top 100
