= Wilhelmsson =

Wilhelmsson is a surname. Notable people with the surname include:

- Hans Wilhelmsson Ahlmann (1889–1974), Swedish geographer, glaciologist, and diplomat
- Christian Wilhelmsson (born 1979), AKA Chippen, Swedish former professional footballer
- Gunnar Wilhelmsson (born 1954), Swedish former footballer
- Hans Wilhelmsson (1936–2004), Swedish speed skater
- Jonathan Wilhelmsson (born 1991), Swedish director and filmmaker
- Lars-Åke Wilhelmsson (born 1958), Swedish fashion designer and drag artist

== See also ==
- Wilhelms, Wilhelmsen, Wilhelmson, Wilhelmsson
- Willems, Willemse, Willemsen, Willemsens, Willemszoon
- Williams, Williamson, Wilson (list), Willson, Willyams
