= Andrew Williamson =

Andrew Williamson may refer to:

- Andrew Williamson (judge) (born 1946), deputy deemster of the Isle of Man
- Andrew Williamson (soldier) (c. 1730–1786), Scots immigrant
- Andrew G. Williamson (1945–1975), British archaeologist

== See also ==
- Drew Williamson (born 1983), Australian basketball player
