= Wim =

Wim is a Dutch masculine given name or a shortened form of Willem and may refer to:

- Wim Anderiesen (1903–1944), Dutch footballer
- Wim Aantjes (1923–2015), Dutch politician
- Wim Arras (born 1964), Flemish Belgian cyclist
- Wim Blockmans (born 1945), Flemish Belgian Professor of Medieval History at Leiden University
- Wim Boost (1918–2005), Dutch cartoonist
- Wim Boissevain (1927–2023), Australian painter of Dutch descent
- Wim Botha (born 1974), South African contemporary artist
- Wim Cohen (1923–2000), Dutch mathematician
- Wim Crouwel (1928–2019), Dutch graphic designer and typographer
- Wim Crusio (born 1954), Dutch behavioral neurogeneticist
- Wim De Coninck (born 1959), Flemish Belgian footballer
- Wim De Decker (born 1982), Flemish Belgian football player
- Wim De Vocht (born 1982), Flemish Belgian professional road bicycle racer
- Wim Deetman (born 1945), Dutch politician and statesman
- Wim Delvoye (born 1965), Flemish Belgian conceptual artist
- Wim Duisenberg (1935–2005), Dutch banker and politician
- Wim Ebbinkhuijsen (born 1939), retired Dutch computer scientist
- Wim Eijk (born 1953), Dutch prelate of the Roman Catholic Church
- Wim Eyckmans (born 1973), Flemish Belgian race car driver
- Wim Feyaerts (21st century), Flemish Belgian television director
- Wim Fissette (born 1980), Flemish Belgian tennis coach and former player
- Wim Gijsen (1933–1990), Dutch science fiction and fantasy writer
- Wim Henderickx (born 1962), Flemish Belgian classical music composer
- Wim Hermsen (born 1947), Dutch former water polo player
- Wim Hesterman (1897–1971), Dutch boxer
- Wim Hof (born 1959), Dutch adventurer and daredevil
- Wim Jansen (1946–2022), Dutch football player and manager
- Wim Jonk (born 1966), Dutch football player
- Wim Kan (1911–1983), Dutch cabaret artist
- Wim Kieft (born 1962), Dutch footballer
- Wim Koevermans (born 1960), Dutch football central defender
- Wim Kok (1938–2018), Dutch politician, Prime Minister of the Netherlands from 1994 to 2002
- Wim Kolijn (1944–2015), Dutch politician
- Wim Kortenoeven (born 1955), Dutch politician, author and journalist
- Wim Mertens (born 1953), Flemish Belgian composer, countertenor vocalist, pianist, guitarist, and musicologist
- Wim Meutstege (born 1952), Dutch football player
- Wim Mook (1932–2016), Dutch isotope physicist
- Wim Rijsbergen (born 1952), Dutch football manager
- Wim Ruska (1940–2015), Dutch judoka
- Wim T. Schippers (born 1942), Dutch artist, comedian and voice actor
- Wim Schermerhorn (1894–1977), Dutch politician, Prime Minister of the Netherlands from 1945 to 1946
- Wim Schröder (born 1971), Dutch show jumping equestrian
- Wim Schokking (1900–1960), Dutch politician, Minister of Defence of the Netherlands
- Wim Schuhmacher (1894–1986), Dutch painter and designer
- Wim Slijkhuis (1923–2003), Dutch track and field runner
- Wim Sonneveld (1917–1974), Dutch cabaret artist and singer
- Wim Soutaer (born 1974), Flemish Belgian singer
- Wim Stroetinga (born 1985), Dutch professional racing cyclist
- Wim Suurbier (1945–2020), Dutch football player
- Wim Taymans (born 1972), Flemish Belgian software developer
- Wim Thoelke (1927–1995), German TV host
- Wim Thomassen (1909–2001), Dutch politician
- Wim Turkenburg (born 1947), Dutch academic
- Wim Udenhout (1937–2023), Surinamese Prime Minister in the mid-1980s
- Wim Van Belleghem (1963–2026), Belgian rower
- Wim van de Schilde (born 1948), Dutch water polo player
- Wim van den Goorbergh (born 1948), Dutch economist and banker
- Wim van der Kroft (1916–2001), Dutch canoer
- Wim van der Veen, Dutch ten-pin bowler
- Wim van der Voort (1923–2016), Dutch speed skater
- Wim van Eekelen (1931–2025), Dutch politician, diplomat, and political scientist; Minister of Defence of the Netherlands
- Wim van Es (born 1934), Dutch archaeologist
- Wim van Est (1923–2003), Dutch cyclist
- Wim Van Grembergen (born 1947), Flemish Belgian organizational theorist and professor
- Wim van Heel (1922–1972), Dutch field hockey player
- Wim van Heumen (1928–1992), Dutch field hockey coach
- Wim Van Huffel (born 1979), Belgian professional road bicycle racer
- Wim van Hulst (1939–2018), Dutch economist and professor
- Wim van Norden (1917–2015), Dutch journalist
- Wim van Spingelen (born 1938), Dutch water polo player
- Wim van Til (born 1953), Dutch footballer
- Wim Vansevenant (born 1971), Flemish Belgian professional road bicycle racer
- Wim Vriend (1941–2021), Dutch water polo player
- Wim Wenders (born 1945), German film director, playwright, photographer and producer
- Wim Zaal (1935–2021), Dutch journalist, essayist, translator and literary critic

== See also ==
- Javon Wims (born 1994), American football player
- Whim (disambiguation)
