= Samuel Williamson =

Samuel Williamson may refer to:

- Samuel Williamson (painter) (1792–1840), English painter
- Samuel Williamson (academic) (1795–1882), president of Davidson College
- Samuel T. Williamson (1891–1962), American journalist, biographer and book reviewer
- Samuel R. Williamson Jr. (born 1935), American academic, president and vice-chancellor of the University of the South, Sewanee, Tennessee
- Samuel Williamson (scientist) (1939–2005), physicist and neuroscientist, co-developer of magnetic source imaging
- Sam Williamson (born 1987), English footballer
- Samuel Williamson (swimmer) (born 1997), Australian swimmer
- Samuel H. Williamson, leading economist "Measuring economic worth over time".
