= Willemina =

Willemina is a Dutch feminine given name similar to Wilhelmina. Bearers often use a short form in daily life, including Ineke, Mien, Miep, Wil, Will, Willeke, Minnie, Willy, Willie and Wilma. People with the name include:

- Willemina Jacoba "Wil" van Gogh (1862–1941), Dutch nurse and early feminist, sister of Vincent van Gogh
- Willemina C.A. "Wilma" van Hofwegen (born 1971), Dutch swimmer
- Willemina "Will" van Kralingen (1951–2012), Dutch actress
- Willemina Ogterop (1881–1974), Dutch-born American stained glass window designer
- Willemina R.C. "Mirjam" Sterk (born 1973), Dutch politician and educator
- Willemina Hendrika "Ineke" Tigelaar (born 1945), Dutch swimmer
- Willemina Zwanida "Willeke" Wendrich (born 1961), Dutch-born American Egyptologist and archaeologist
