= Archibald Williamson =

Archibald Williamson may refer to:

- Archibald Williamson, 1st Baron Forres (1860–1931), British businessman and Liberal Party politician
- Archibald Williamson (cricketer) (1892–1972), English first-class cricketer
