= Karin Wilhelmson =

Swedish journalist and radio producer (1933–2018)

Karin Margareta Wilhelmson, née Nordh (January 4, 1933, in Nyköping – August 12, 2018, in Stockholm) was a Swedish journalist and radio producer.

== Career ==
Wilhelmson worked as a daily press journalist from 1950, since 1960 as a producer at Sveriges Radio. She was a member of TV1's program council from 1973 to 1978.

Together with Monica Boëthius and Birgitta Rembe, she was a member of the Family Mirror in the 1960s. Wilhelmson led the Sommar radio program on August 22, 1968, and August 6, 1970.

== Personal life ==
In 1953, she married Anders Wilhelmson. They had three children.
