= Michael Willems =

Canadian photographer

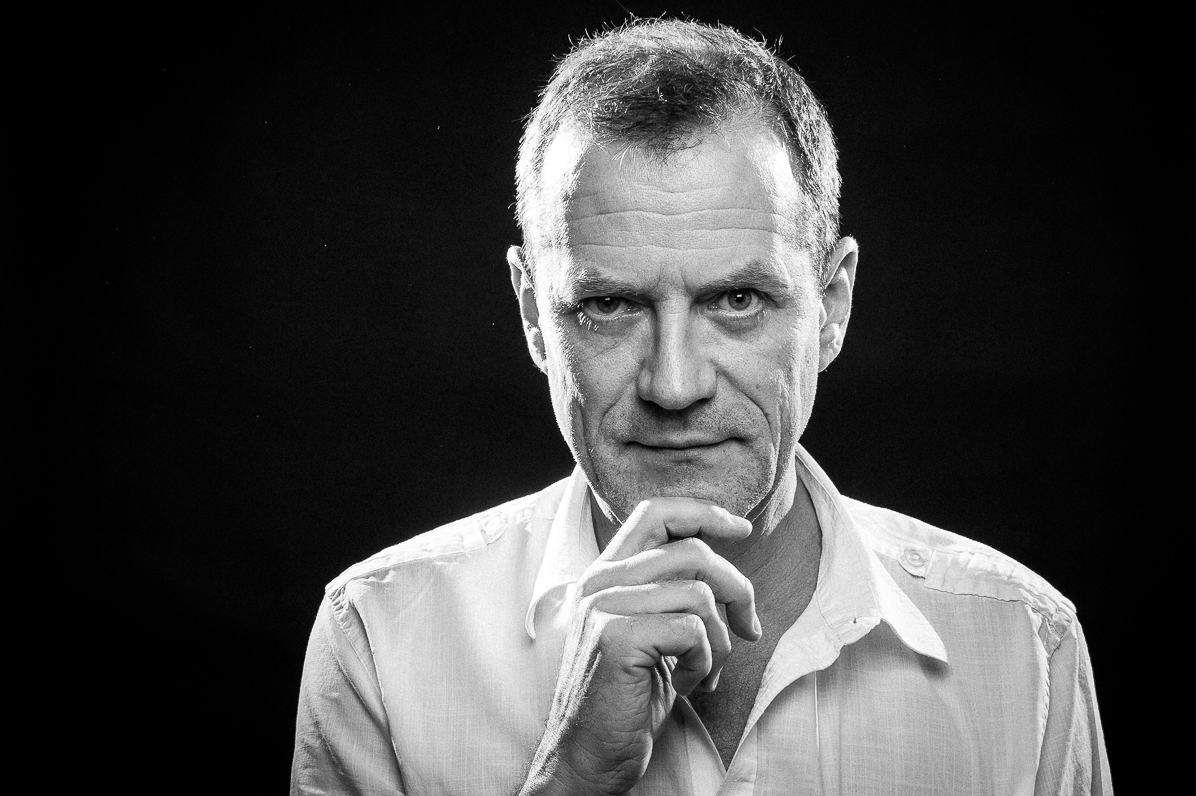
- Michael Willems (2014)
- Born: Michael Valentijn Willems; 1 January 1959; Schiedam, Netherlands
- Education: University of London
- Known for: Photographer of nudes, portraits
- Website: http://www.michaelwillems.ca

Michael Willems (born 1959) is a Canadian photographer and photography educator who was born in the Netherlands. He is known mainly for his daily teaching blog, and for his photo series, Contact 2009 exhibit, and book "IV – Intravenous", the story of two Toronto drug users who beat their addiction.

== Early life ==
Willems was born in Schiedam, The Netherlands, and attended secondary school in Gouda. In 1975 he moved to the United Kingdom and attended Hurtwood House School in Holmbury St Mary, Surrey. From 1977, he attended the University of London, where in 1981 he obtained the degree of BSc(Eng) in Electronic Engineering.

== Early career ==
He worked as a telecommunications engineer for Philips 1980–1988. This took him to difficult to reach areas in Libya, Iraq, and Nigeria, among others: he claims to have worked in 39 countries. His active engagement in photography started at that time. From 1988 to 1995 he ran Ixonet Marketing Technology in Bussum, the Netherlands. After moving to Canada in 1995, he joined KL Group as Channel Sales Director. 2000–2010 he was Chief Technology Officer at Digital View, later EnQii. It was during this time that he started working as a newspaper photographer, and that he started teaching at Henrys School of Imaging. In 2010 he went full-time as photographer and educator.

== Today ==
Willems today teaches photography in the Faculty Of Professional And Continuing Studies at Sheridan College in Oakville, Ontario. He also teaches at Vistek and privately and presents frequently to photo clubs. He photographs everything from families and executives to corporations, events and models.

His teaching blog, speedlighter.ca shows a new post almost every day. Its stated intent is to educate owners of DSLR cameras, so that they make proper use of their equipment.

== Personal life ==
In 1988, Willems married Nancy Jean. They have two children, Jason (1990) and Daniel (1994). In 2011, Willems and Jean separated. He now lives alone.

== Controversy ==
Willems was fired by Henrys School of Imaging, Canada's largest photographic school, after a client objected to a nude self-portrait he had posted. His shooting nudes costs him significant business, but he feels that North American society needs changing. He also thinks it would be dishonest not to do what he asks his models to do, so he continues to both shoot nudes and shoot nude self-portraits.

== Recognition ==
In 2008, he won the Halton Police Photo Award; in 2014 the Cogeco/OAC Award For Digital Arts. In 2008, he was granted a Licentiate ("LPPO") by Professional Photographers of Ontario. He is a member of Photosensitive, a collective of Canadian photojournalists who aim to engender societal change through photography. In that capacity, he was invited to take part in Photosensitive's "Picture Change" (2013) and "Aging Canada" (2014) exhibits. He is also known for his nudes, which have been widely exhibited, including in Toronto's historic Distillery District.

== Books ==
Willems is the author of six photography books, available as e-books:

Title	Publication Date	ISBN	Notes
Powerful Portrait Photography	2015	ISBN 978-0-9918636-5-5	
Stunning Landscape Photography	2014	ISBN 978-0-9918636-4-8	
Mastering Your Camera	2014	ISBN 978-0-9918636-2-4	Learn any camera
Impactful Travel Photography	2013	ISBN 978-0-9918636-3-1	
Pro Flash Manual	2013	ISBN 978-0-9918636-1-7	
Photography Cookbook	2012	ISBN 978-0-9918636-0-0	Photographic checklists

He regularly holds solo exhibits of his work. He has been published in many newspapers and magazines, including the National Post, the Toronto Star, the Toronto Sun, The Globe and Mail; and he has appeared on TV and radio, including CBC Radio, Sun News, Naked News, and TWIP – This Week in Photo.
