= Jelle van Kruijssen =

Dutch footballer

Personal information
- Date of birth: 3 July 1989 (age 37)
- Place of birth: Eindhoven, Netherlands
- Height: 1.84 m (6 ft 0 in)
- Position: Striker

Team information
- Current team: UNA
- Number: 9

Youth career
- UNA
- DVS
- Willem II

Senior career*
Years	Team	Apps	(Gls)
2010–2013	Eindhoven	58	(13)
2013	→ Dutch Lions (loan)	12	(6)
2013–2014	Zwarte Leeuw	23	(17)
2014–2015	Hoogstraten	32	(20)
2015–2020	Berchem Sport	122	(86)
2020–2022	Londerzeel	25	(15)
2022–2024	Wezel Sport	27	(16)
2024–	UNA	0	(0)
- * Club domestic league appearances and goals as of 8 October 2024

Jelle van Kruijssen (born 3 July 1989) is a Dutch footballer who plays as a striker for VV UNA.

== Playing career ==
Van Kruijssen spent his youth at amateur sides, UNA and DVS, but transferred to the Willem II youth team as a teenager. He did not break through to the first team, resulting in a transfer to FC Eindhoven together with fellow Willem II player, Ratko Vansimpsen. Van Kruijssen made his first team debut on 27 August 2010, replacing Vansimpsen 83 minutes into a 3–0 victory over Fortuna Sittard at Jan Louwers Stadion.

In 2013, van Kruijssen was sent on a summer loan to the USL Premier Development League team, Houston Dutch Lions. He made his debut on 11 May 2013 against Laredo Heat where he scored. After this he would no longer get a professional contract and played in Belgium for Zwarte Leeuw, Hoogstraten VV and Berchem Sport. He moved to Londerzeel ahead of the 2020–21 season.
