= Ben Williamson =

Ben Williamson may refer to:

- Ben M. Williamson (1864–1941), Democratic U.S. Senator from Kentucky
- Ben Williamson (English footballer) (born 1988), English footballer
- Ben Williamson (Scottish footballer) (born 2001), Scottish footballer
- Ben Williamson Memorial Bridge, a bridge connecting Coal Grove, Ohio to Ashland, Kentucky
- Ben Williamson (baseball) (born 2000), American baseball player

== See also ==
- Benjamin Williamson (disambiguation)
