= Drogeham =

Drogeham Droegeham (West Frisian)
- Village
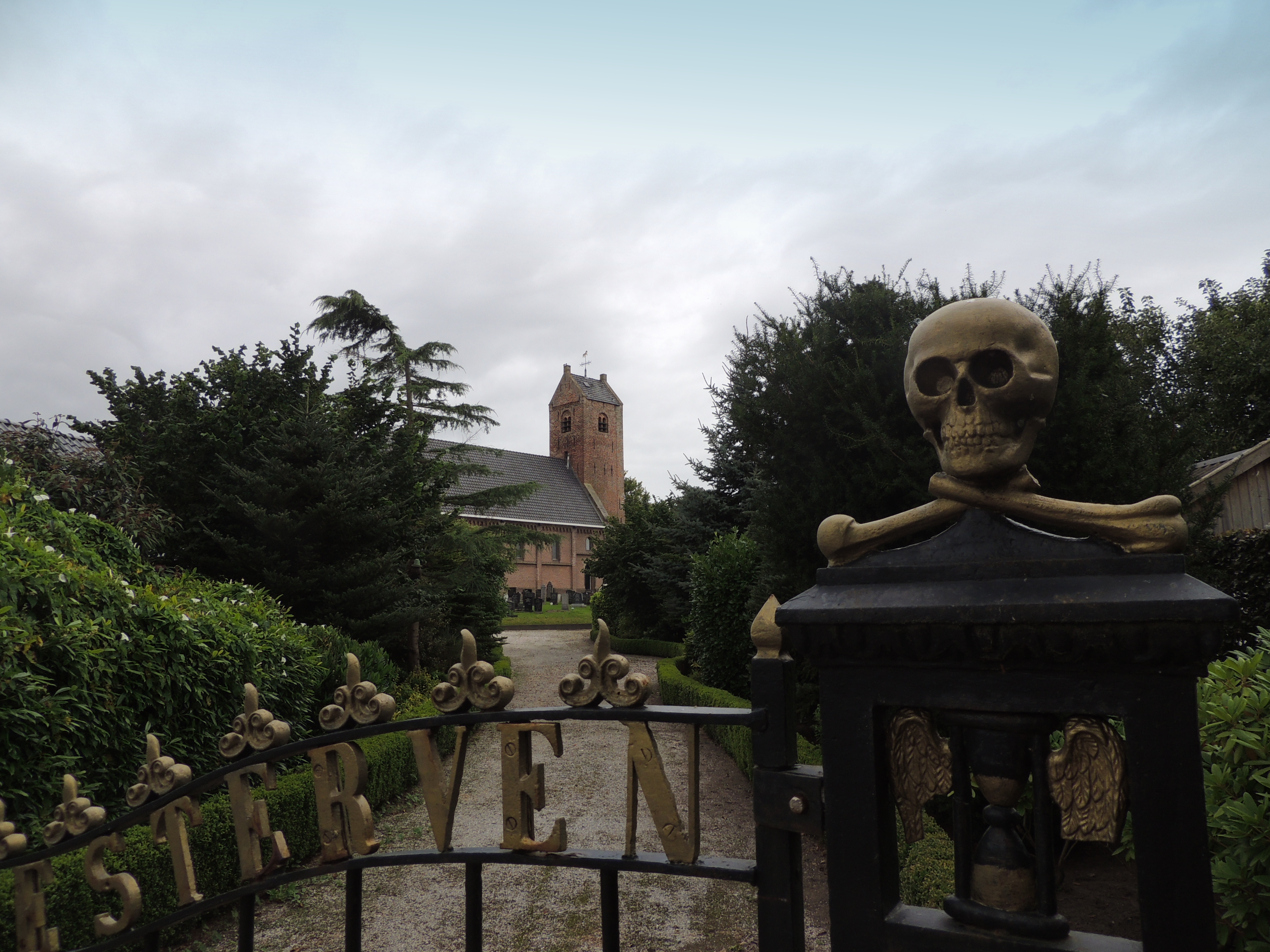
- Walburga Church

- Flag Coat of arms

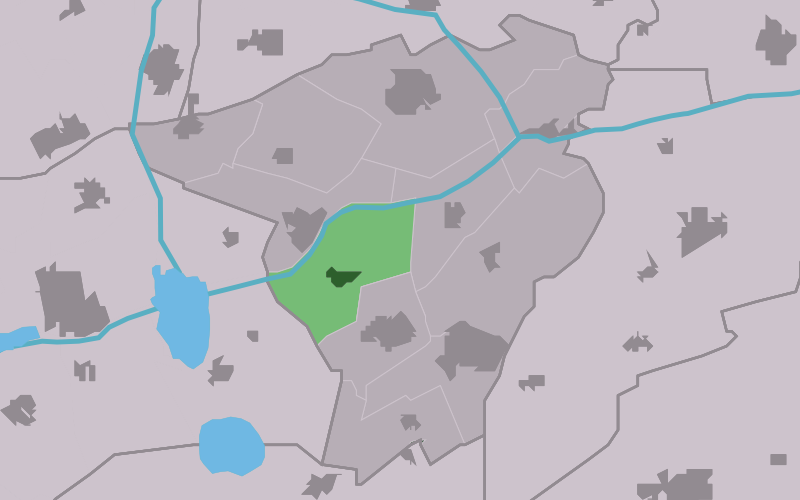
- Location in Achtkarspelen municipality

- Location in the Netherlands Drogeham (Netherlands)
- Coordinates: 53.20169°N 6.11207°E
- Country: Netherlands
- Province: Friesland
- Municipality: Achtkarspelen

Area
  - Total: 10.42 km^{2} (4.02 sq mi)
- Elevation: 3 m (9.8 ft)

Population (2021)
  - Total: 1,725
  - Density: 165.5/km^{2} (428.8/sq mi)
- Time zone: UTC+1 (CET)
  - Summer (DST): UTC+2 (CEST)
- Postal code: 9289
- Dialing code: 0512
- Website: drogeham.com

Drogeham (West Frisian: Droegeham) is a village of about 1,700 inhabitants in the Dutch province of Friesland.

It is in a rural area of the municipality of Achtkarspelen. Agriculture still plays an important part in the town, but small-scale industry is on the increase. Many people have their jobs in nearby larger towns like Drachten, Surhuisterveen, and Leeuwarden. The most common language is still West Frisian although there are more and more people coming to Drogeham who have Dutch as their mother-tongue.

== History ==
The village was first mentioned in 1475 as Asterham, Drogheham, and means dry land in a bend of a stream. Drogeham developed to the west of the monastery of Buweklooster. The tower of the Protestant church of Drogeham dates from circa 1225 and was restored in 1704. The church itself extensively modified in 1876. In 1840, Drogeham was home to 264 people.

== Notable buildings ==
- The Protestant church of Drogeham

== Gallery ==
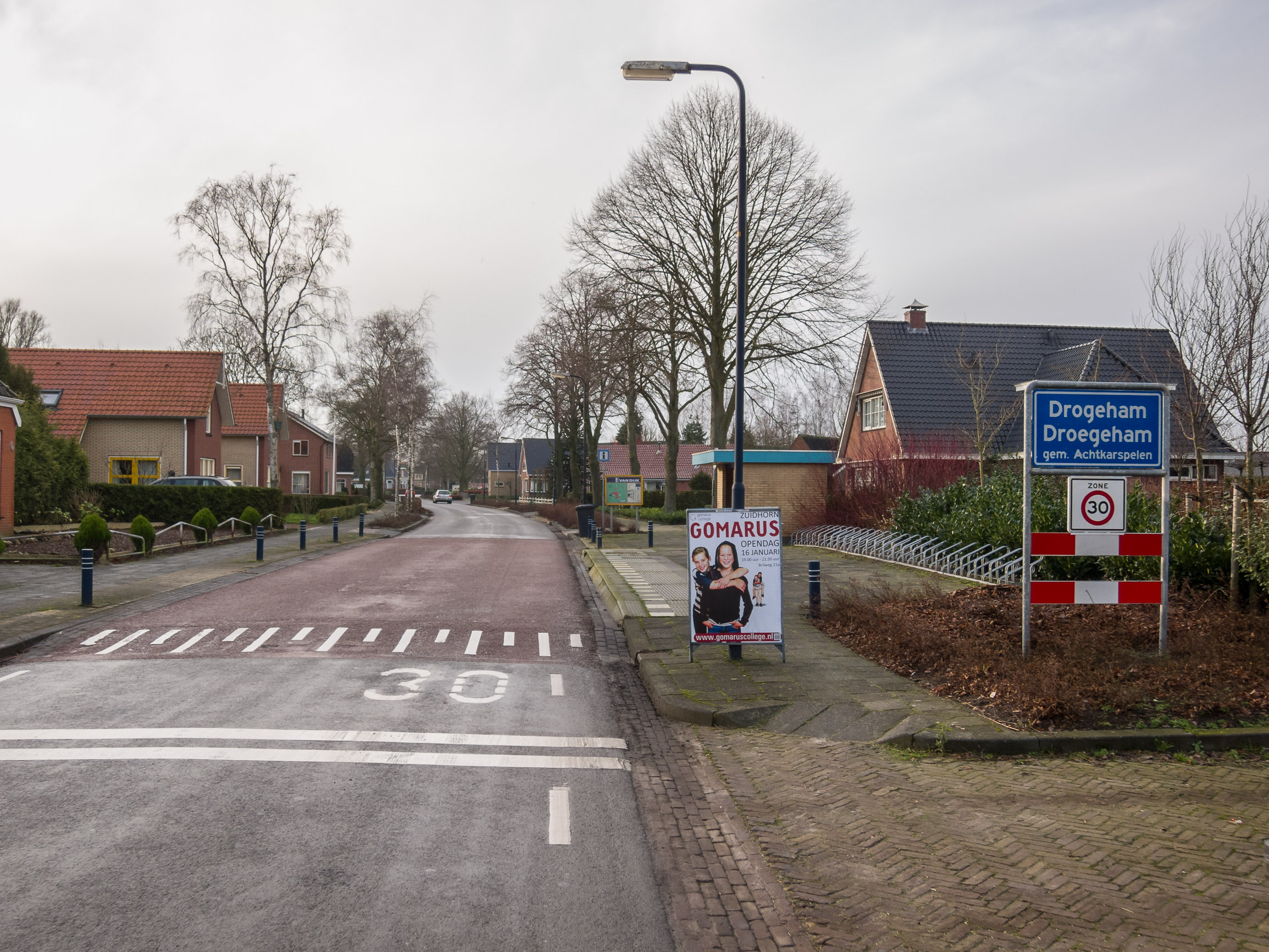
Welcome to Drogeham

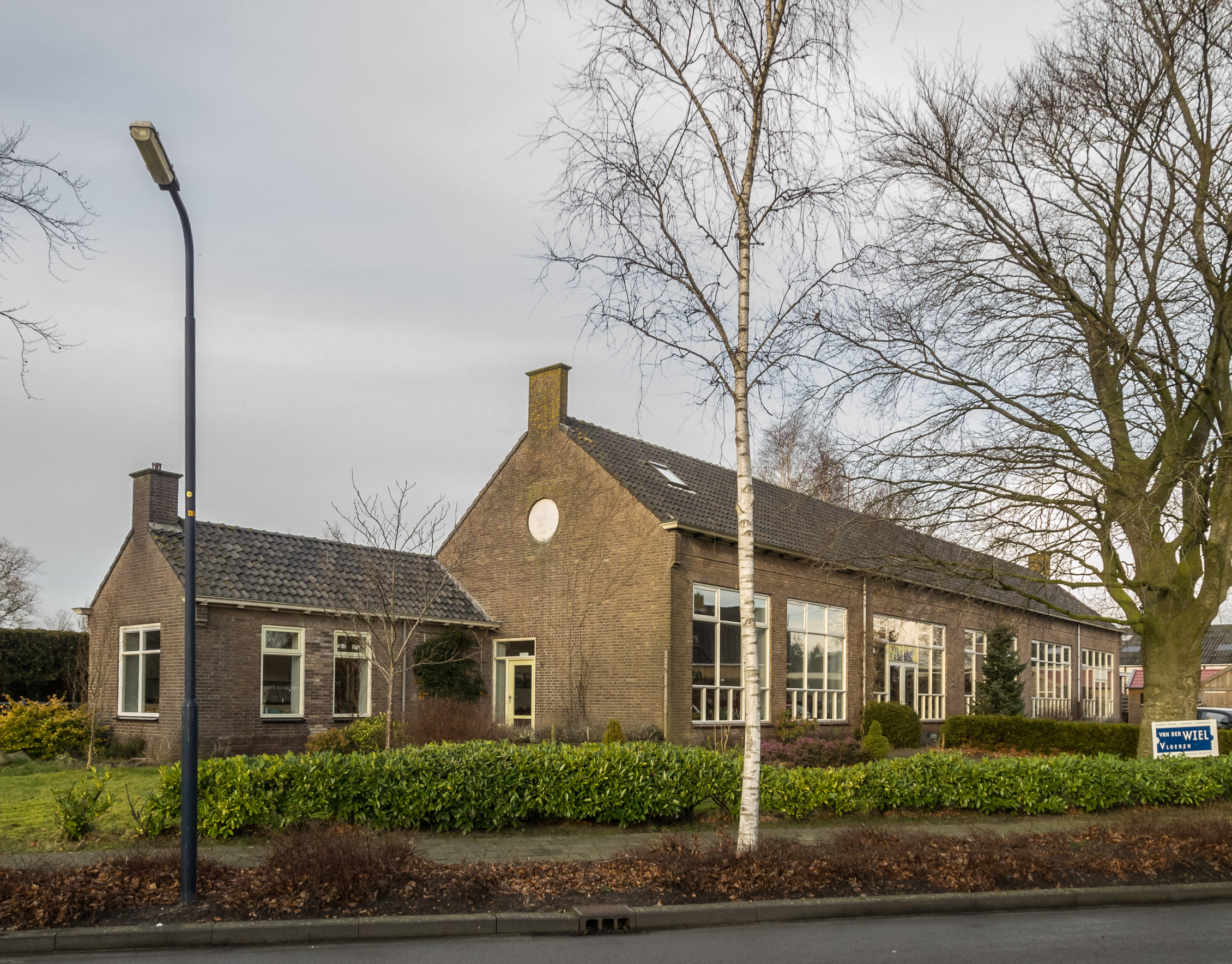
Former school

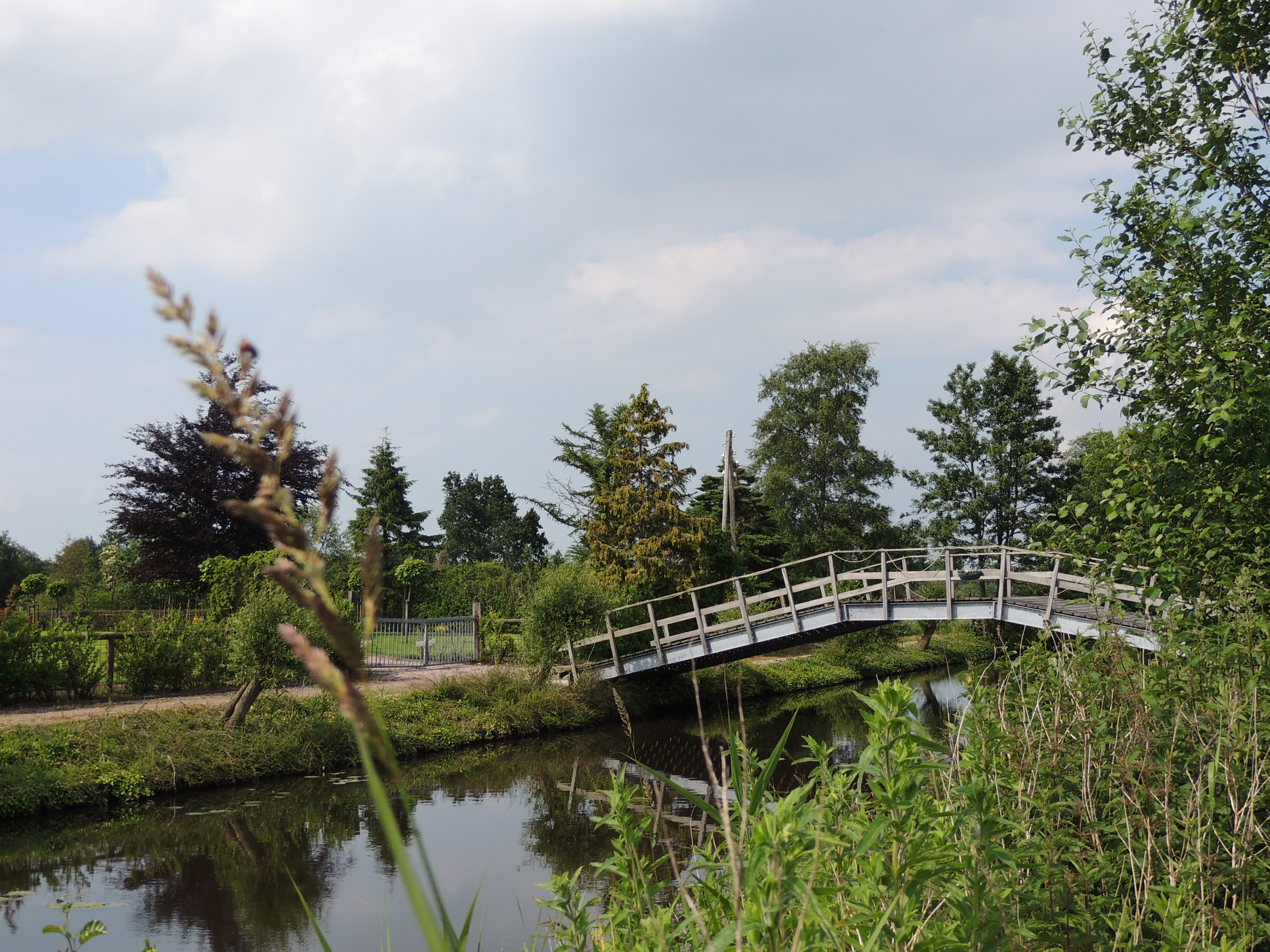
Bridge over the canal

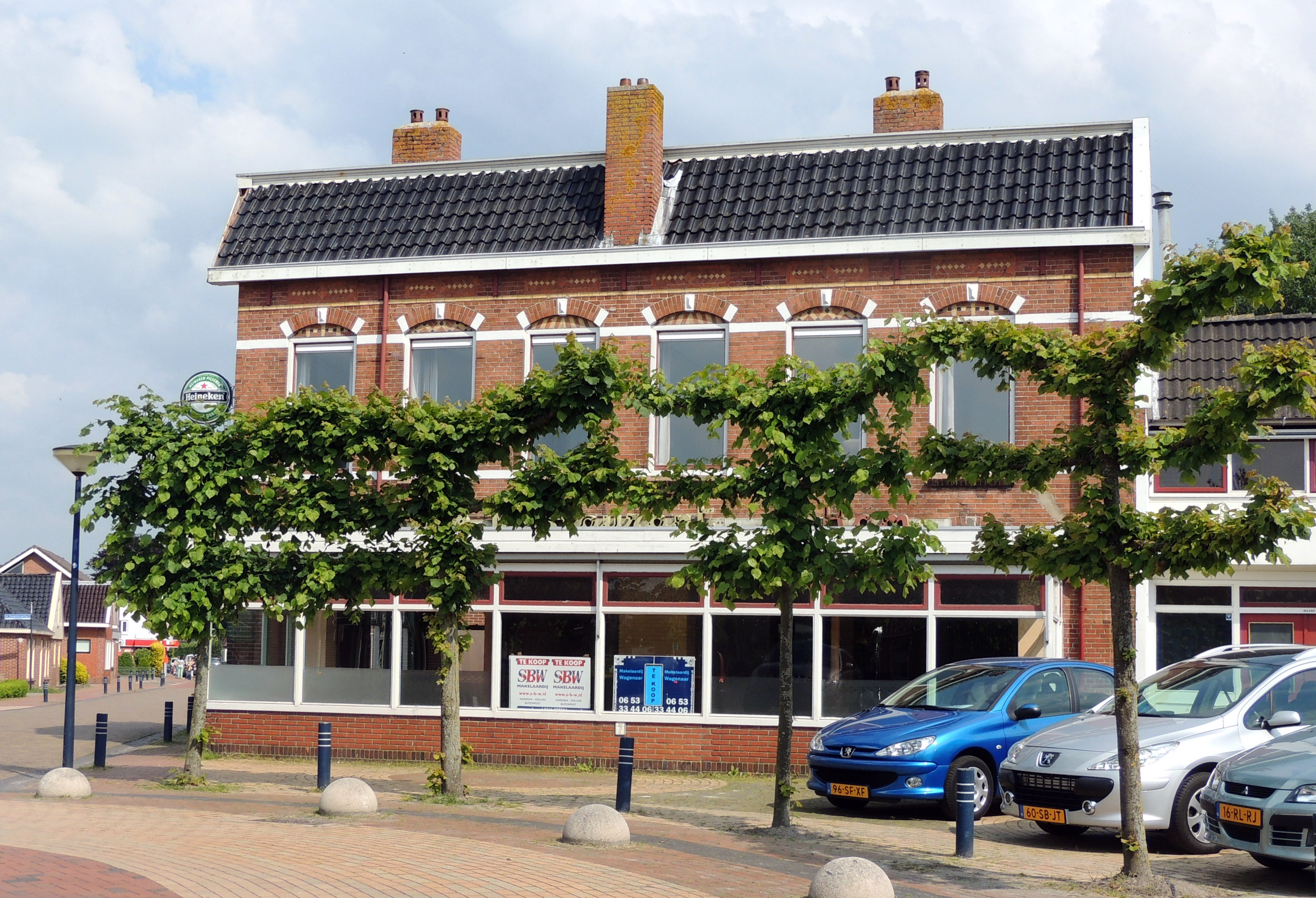
Former pub
