= Kevin Williamson =

Kevin Williamson may refer to:

- Kevin Williamson (writer) (born 1961), Scottish writer
- Kevin Williamson (screenwriter) (born 1965), American screenwriter, producer, director and actor
- Kevin Williamson (swimmer) (born 1959), Irish Olympic swimmer
- Kevin D. Williamson (born 1972), American columnist, pundit, and author
- Kevin Williamson (basketball), American college basketball coach
