= Wally Williamson =

Australian rules footballer

Personal information
- Full name: Walter Allan Williamson
- Born: 7 May 1907; Adelaide, South Australia
- Died: 22 July 1968 (aged 61); Hindmarsh, South Australia
- Height: 185 cm (6 ft 1 in)
- Weight: 79 kg (174 lb)

Playing career^{1}
| Years | Club | Games (Goals) |
| 1928–33, 1935–37 | West Torrens | 118 (20) |
| 1934 | Hawthorn | 12 (1) |
- ^{1} Playing statistics correct to the end of 1937.

Walter Allan Williamson (7 May 1907 – 22 July 1968) was an Australian rules footballer who played with Hawthorn in the Victorian Football League (VFL) and West Torrens in the South Australian National Football League (SANFL).

Williamson, who played his football mostly on the ball or in defence, started his career at West Torrens. He won the West Torrens best and fairest award in 1931 and was captain the next two seasons. His stint as captain included their 1933 premiership win, when they defeated Norwood by 23 points in the grand final.

He played at Hawthorn in the 1934 VFL season, a much weaker side which would win only one of the 12 games that he appeared in. Despite only spending a year at the club, Williamson held the position of vice captain.

Back in South Australia, Williamson played with West Torrens for three further seasons. He represented South Australia in four interstate fixtures during his career.

He was one of many footballers who served his country in World War II, primarily serving in Darwin.

In November 1936 he married Dulcie Elizabeth Lill and they lived in Jetty Street, Grange, South Australia. They had no children together.

Wally Williamson died in Hindmarsh on 22 July 1968.
