= Hedworth Williamson =

Hedworth Williamson may refer to:

- Sir Hedworth Williamson, 7th Baronet (1797–1861), British politician
- Sir Hedworth Williamson, 8th Baronet (1827–1900), British Liberal Party politician

== See also ==
- Williamson baronets
