= Elizabeth Williamson =

British pharmacist

Elizabeth M. Williamson MRPharmS is a former Professor of Pharmacy at the University of Reading, England. Her main research interest is in herbal medicines.

She began work as a practising pharmacist in 1978, working in both community and hospital pharmacies. Before being appointed to the chair in the newly created School of Pharmacy at Reading in 2005 she was Senior Lecturer in Pharmacognosy and Phytotherapy at the University of London School of Pharmacy.

Her published works include an updated edition of the 1907 Potter's Herbal Cyclopaedia (1988, C W Daniel, ISBN 978-0852073612).

She is editor of the journal Phytotherapy Research.
