= Jelle Reyners =

Dutch Golden Age painter (1600–1634)

Jelle Reyners (1600 in Friesland – 1634 in Friesland), was a Dutch Golden Age painter.

== Biography ==
According to Houbraken he was a good glass painter who lived in the period of Wybrand de Geest. A stained glass window by his hand depicting the Flight into Egypt was commissioned by the carpenter's guild for their church in Sneek. Of this glass it was said that it could rival the works of the Crabeth brothers in Gouda.

According to the RKD he was a draughtsman who possibly made drawings of the funeral of Ernst Casimir in 1632.
