= Robert Williamson =

Robert Williamson may refer to:

- Robert Williamson III (born 1970), American poker player
- Robert McAlpin Williamson (1804–1859), Texas politician
- Robert S. Williamson (1825–1882), American soldier and engineer
- Robert B. Williamson (1892–1976), Maine judge
- Robert Wood Williamson (1856–1932), British solicitor and anthropologist
- Roy Williamson (bishop) (Robert Kerr Williamson, 1932–2019), British bishop
- Robert Williamson (geneticist) (1938–2026), British-Australian molecular biologist
- Bobby Williamson (Robert Williamson, born 1961), Scottish football player and manager (Rangers FC, Kilmarnock FC, Hibernian FC, Uganda national team)
- Bobby Williamson (footballer, born 1933) (Robert Williamson, 1933–1990), Scottish football player (St. Mirren FC)
- Robbie Williamson (Robert Williamson, born 1969), Scottish former footballer

== See also ==
- Robert Williamson Steele (1820–1901), governor
