= Andrew G. Williamson =

British archaeologist (1945–1975

Andrew G. Williamson (18 December 1945 – 4 May 1975) was a British archaeologist who specialised in the historic archaeology of southern Iran, Arabia and the Persian Gulf.

== Career ==
After Rugby School (Bradley House), Williamson studied at Pembroke College, University of Oxford under the supervision of Ralph Pinder-Wilson (1919–2008). His doctoral research involved a survey of Sasanian and Islamic period settlements along the Iranian coast and inland through parts of Fars and Kerman between 1968 and 1971. He also completed initial excavations at Sirjan in 1970 and Tepe Dasht-i Deh close to Tepe Yahya in 1971 and 1972.

In 1973, before completing his doctoral thesis, he was appointed as the first Director of Antiquities of Oman, tasked with the formation of the Department of Antiquities (now the Ministry of Heritage and Tourism) and plans for the formation of the National Museum of Oman, which eventually opened in 2016.. Whilst in Oman, he began work with the Harvard Archaeological Survey to document the Early Islamic port of Sohar.

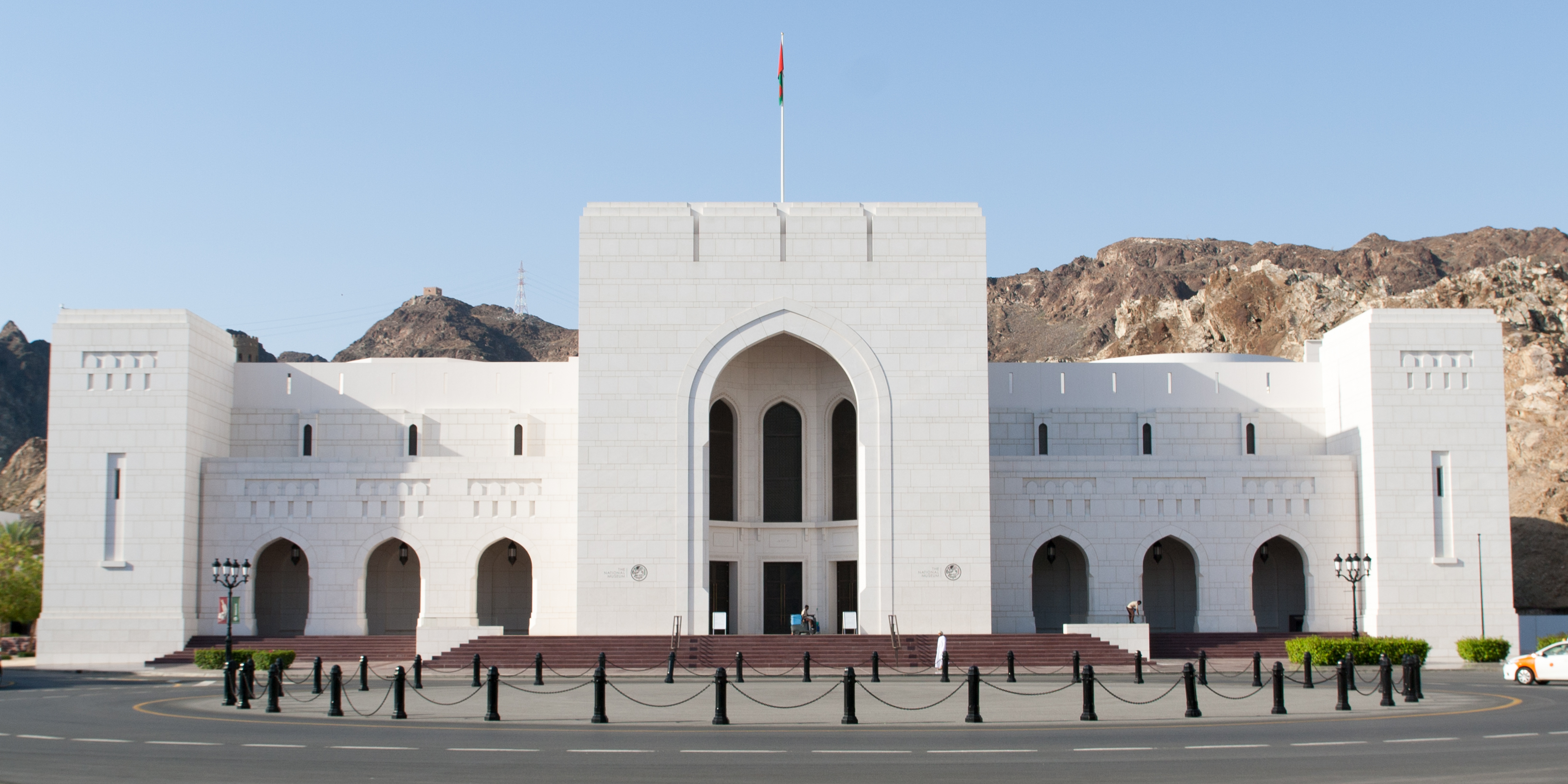
National Museum (Oman)

In 1975, Williamson died when his vehicle detonated a landmine in the southern Dhofar region whilst returning in a military convoy from the early Indian Ocean port site of Khor Rori (ancient Sumhuram).

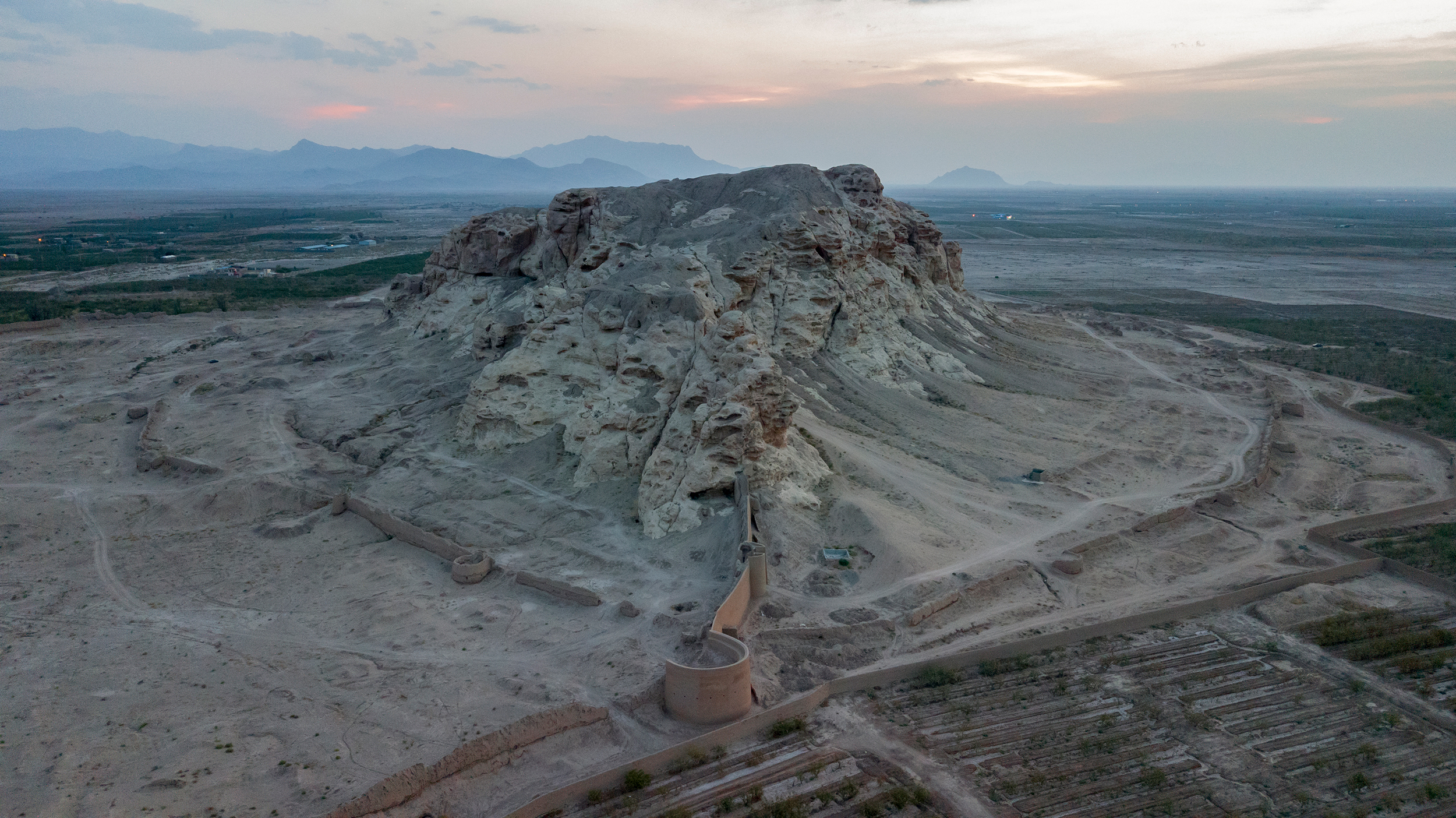
Sang Castle (Persian: قلعه سنگ) in Sirjan County, Kerman.

A project to catalogue Williamson's archive has been initiated by Seth Priestman and Derek Kennet (Durham University).

== Bibliography ==
- Williamson, A.G. 1970: 'Islamic trade routes in Southern Iran', Iran, 8: 206–07.
- Williamson, A.G. 1971: 'Sirjan', Iran, 9: 177.
- Williamson, A.G. 1971: 'Excavations at Tepe Dasht-i-Deh', Iran, 9: 182–83.
- Williamson, A.G. 1972: 'Sirjan-i-Kuhna and Tepe Dasht-i-Deh'. In P.R.S. Moorey (ed.) Excavations in Iran. The British Contribution. Organising Committee of the Sixth International Congress of Iranian Art and Archaeology: Oxford, 26–28.
- Williamson, A.G. 1972: 'The Yahya Project: Tepe Dasht-i-Deh', Iran, 10: 177–78.
- Williamson, A.G. 1972: 'Persian Gulf commerce in the Sasanian period and the first two centuries of Islam', Bastan Chenasi va Honar-e Iran, 9/10: 97-109 (foreign section), 142-151 (Iranian section).
- Williamson, A.G. 1973: 'Hormuz and the trade of the Gulf in the 14th and 15th centuries A.D.', Proceedings of the Seminar for Arabian Studies, 6: 52–68.
- Williamson, A.G. 1973: Sohar and Omani Seafaring in the Indian Ocean. Petroleum Development (Oman) Ltd: Muscat.
- Williamson, A.G. 1974: 'Harvard archaeological survey in Oman, 1973: III – Sohar and the trade of Oman in the tenth century A.D.', Proceedings of the Seminar for Arabian Studies, 4: 78–96.
- Williamson, A.G. 1987: 'Regional distribution of medieval Persian pottery in the light of recent investigations'. In J.W. Allan & C. Roberts (eds.) Syria and Iran. Three Studies in Medieval Ceramics. Oxford Studies in Islamic Art, 4: 11–22.
- Whitehouse, D. & Williamson, A.G. 1973: 'Sasanian maritime trade', Iran, 11: 29–49.
