= Thomas Williamson =

Thomas or Tom Williamson may refer to:

- Thomas Smith Williamson (1800–1879), American physician and missionary
- Thomas Williamson (surgeon) (1815–1885), Scottish surgeon and medical officer of health
- Thomas Andrew Williamson (1831–1891), American serial killer
- Thomas Roney Williamson (1852–1896), American architect
- Thomas Williamson (Australian politician) (1853–1921), New South Wales politician
- Tom Williamson (golfer) (1880–1950), English professional golfer
- Thomas Wilson Williamson (1887–1974), American architect
- Tom Williamson, Baron Williamson (1897–1983), British trade union leader and Member of Parliament
- Tom Williamson (Scottish footballer) (1901–1988), Scottish footballer
- Tommy Williamson (footballer, born 1913), (1913-1992), English footballer, see List of Oldham Athletic A.F.C. players
- Tom Williamson (English footballer) (born 1984), English footballer
- Tom Williamson (actor) (born 1990), American actor
- Tom Williamson (Australian footballer) (born 1998), Australian footballer
- Thomas Williamson (soccer) (born 1999), American soccer player

== See also ==
- Nicol Williamson (Thomas Nicol Williamson, 1936–2011), Scottish actor
