= Stephen F. Williamson =

U.S. Navy officer

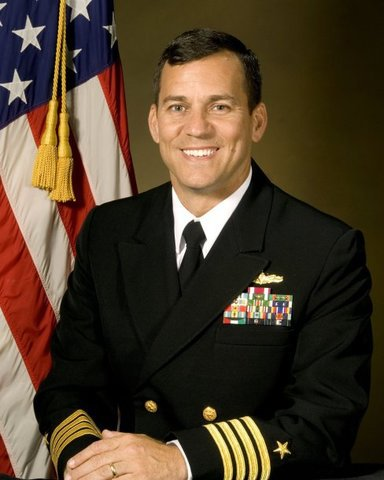
- Williamson as a Navy Captain circa 2011
- Born: 1966 (age 59–60); Bowie, Maryland
- Military career
- Allegiance: United States of America
- Branch: United States Navy
- Service years: 1988–2019

RADM Stephen Frederick Williamson (born 1966) is a former United States Naval officer. In 2015, Secretary of Defense Ash Carter announced that President Barack Obama had nominated Capt. Stephen F. Williamson for the rank of Rear admiral (lower half).

Williamson has served tours on USS Lynde McCormick (DDG-8), USS Long Beach (CGN-9) and commanded the Puget Sound Naval Shipyard until 2015. Williamson reported as the director for Fleet Maintenance, United States Pacific Fleet in October 2015. He served as director of industrial operations at Naval Sea Systems Command beginning in September 2017.

In July 2019 Williamson was relieved of his command as director of industrial operations at Naval Sea Systems Command by Vice Adm. Thomas Moore after the Navy inspector general found that Williamson was having a consensual but inappropriate personal relationship with a female subordinate at Naval Sea Systems Command.

== Education ==
Raised in Silver Spring, Maryland, Williamson attended the University of Maryland and earned a Bachelor's Degree in Economics from George Washington University in 1988. He attended the Naval Postgraduate School and became an engineering duty officer while earning his Master of Science degree in mechanical engineering in 1996.

== Awards ==
- Navy Distinguished Service Medal
- Legion of Merit
- Meritorious Service Medal (2 awards)
- Joint Service Commendation Medal
- Navy and Marine Corps Commendation Medal (3 awards)
- Navy and Marine Corps Achievement Medal (4 awards)
