= Henry Charles Williamson =

Scottish zoologist (1871-1949)

Dr Henry Charles Williamson FRSE FRCVS (1871–1949) was a Scottish zoologist who pioneered marine biology.

In authorship he usually appears as H. C. Williamson.

== Life ==
He was born in Dundee in 1871, the son of Rev Henry Williamson of the Unitarian Church. He was educated at the High School of Dundee, then studied chemistry under William Carmichael McIntosh at the University of St Andrews, graduating BSc in 1893. In 1895 he began working for the Fishery Board for Scotland.

He was granted a doctorate (DSc) in 1902.

His research included attempts to introduce herring to the seas around Australia and New Zealand.

In 1908 he was elected a Fellow of the Royal Society of Edinburgh. His proposers were William Carmichael McIntosh, Sir John Arthur Thomson, Peter Redford Scott Lang and Daniel John Cunningham.

It is thought he continued to live with his father well into adulthood, living at 13 Coupar Street in the Lochee district of Dundee.

In 1925, after 30 years at the Fishery Board, he left Scotland to work at the Pacific Biological Station at Nanaimo in British Columbia on the western coast of Canada. His main interest here was salmon migration. He returned to Scotland in 1930.

He died in Dundee on 8 December 1949. He was unmarried and had no children.
