= Alexander Williamson =

Alexander Williamson may refer to:

- Alexander William Williamson (1824–1904), chemist who discovered the Williamson ether synthesis reaction
- Alexander Williamson (missionary) (1829–1890), Scottish Protestant missionary to China with the London Missionary Society
- Alexander Watt Williamson (1849–1928), New Zealand schoolteacher
- Alexander Williamson (colonial administrator), member of the Executive Council of the Colony of British Honduras, appointed Companion of the Order of St Michael and St George as part of the 1897 Diamond Jubilee Honours
