= Harold Williamson (British artist) =

British artist

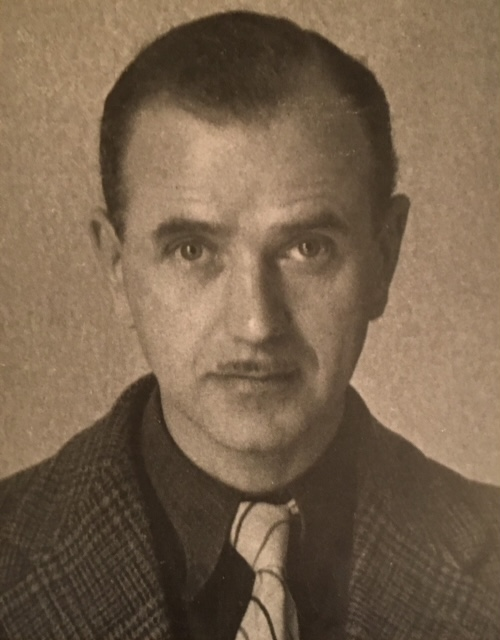
- Born: 1898; Manchester, England
- Died: 1972 (aged 73–74)
- Education: Manchester School of Art
- Known for: Painting

Harold Williamson (1898–1972) was a British artist, known as a painter, designer, etcher and teacher.

== Biography ==
Williamson was born in Manchester in 1892 and took evening classes at the Manchester School of Art between 1913 and 1916. From 1916 to 1919, during World War I, he served in the Royal Navy Volunteer Reserve and then returned for further studies at the Manchester School of Art until 1922. For a time he worked in London as a designer for Arthur Sanderson & Sons, the fabric and wallpaper firm. In 1926 he obtained a post as Painting Master at Bournemouth College of Art where he remained until 1947. In 1947 he returned to the Manchester College of Art and Design as the head of the department of Fine Art, where he remained until 1962. He lived in Sale, Cheshire.

Williamson exhibited at the Royal Academy in London, with the New English Art Club, the Walker Art Gallery in Liverpool, the Manchester City Art Gallery and in the United States. Williamson's work is included in the permanent collections of the Southampton City Art Gallery, the Russell-Cotes Art Gallery & Museum, the Manchester Art Gallery and the Southport Art Galleries. A retrospective exhibition of his work was held at the Belgrave Gallery during 1979.
