= Joseph Williamson =

Joseph Williamson may refer to:

- Joseph Williamson (English politician) (1633–1701), English politician
- Joseph Williamson (philanthropist) (1769–1840), British tobacco magnate, directed construction of Williamson Tunnels
- Joseph Williamson (Maine politician) (1789–1854), American politician in Maine
- Joseph Williamson (Illinois politician), American politician in Illinois
