= Benjamin Williamson =

Benjamin Williamson may refer to:

- Ben Williamson (English footballer) (born 1988), English footballer who plays for National League club Eastleigh
- Benjamin Williamson (mathematician) (1827–1916), Irish mathematician who was a Fellow of Trinity College Dublin
- Benjamin Williamson (political advisor), served as deputy assistant to President Donald Trump and senior adviser to Chief of Staff Mark Meadows
- Benjamin Michael Williamson (Event Manager and musician), AKA BWilly is an English DJ from Manchester with tracks Such as Rabbit in a Hat.

== See also ==
- Ben Williamson (disambiguation)
