= Jane Louisa Willyams =

British novelist and historian

- Born: 20 October 1786; Carnanton House
- Died: 28 May 1878 (aged 91); Budleigh Salterton
- Parent(s): James Willyams

Jane Louisa Willyams (20 October 1786 – 28 May 1878) was a British novelist and historian. Her work focused on early Protestantism in Europe.

Jane Louisa Willyams was born on 20 October 1786 at Carnanton House in Cornwall. She was one of eight children of James Willyams.

With her sister Charlotte Champion Willyams Pascoe she wrote a novel, Coquetry (1818), published thanks to the help of Sir Walter Scott.

Willyams never married. After the death of her father in 1828, Willyams became a resident of a Protestant nunnery in Bristol, the Ladies’ Association. She left the following year, writing about her "disappointment at not finding the society composed of consistent and self-denying Christians."

After a four month stay at Chillon Castle, she published the novel Chillon: or, Protestants of the Sixteenth Century. An Historical Tale in 1845. The same year she published an anti-Catholic tract, The Reason Rendered: A Few Words Addressed to the Inhabitants of M——, in Cornwall.

She published a history of the Waldensians, a heretical sect founded in the 12th century often seen as proto-Protestant, in 1855 and a novel about the Hapsburgs, The Tower of the Hawk, in 1871.

Jane Louisa Willyams died on 28 May 1878 in Budleigh Salterton.

== Bibliography ==
- Coquetry, 1818
- Chillon: or, Protestants of the Sixteenth Century. An Historical Tale. 2 vol. London: Hatchard, 1845.
- The Reason Rendered: A Few Words Addressed to the Inhabitants of M——, in Cornwall. London, 1845.
- A Short History Of The Waldensian Church In The Valleys Of Piedmont: From The Earliest Period To The Present Time, 1855
- The Tower of the Hawk: Some Passages in the History of the House of Hapsburg. 1 vol. London: Hatchard, 1871.
