= Lee Williamson (disambiguation) =

Lee Williamson (born 1982) is a Jamaican-English footballer.

Lee Williamson may also refer to:

- Lee Williamson (American football) (born 1968), American football player
- Lee Williamson (bowls), British lawn bowler
