= Musicals in Ahoy =

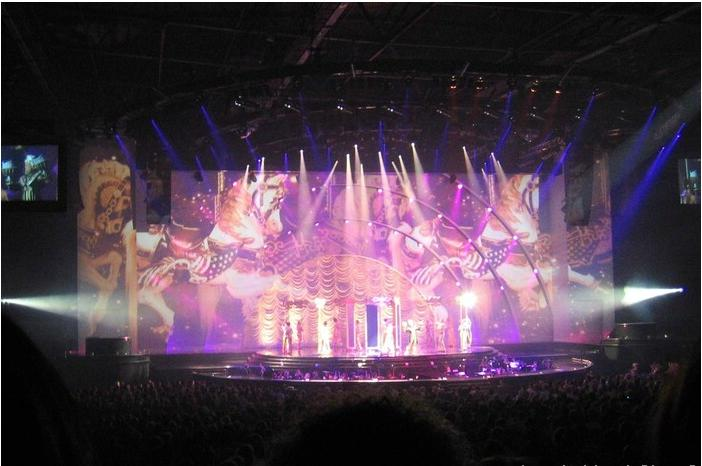

Musicals in Ahoy was a musical show that took place in 2002 in "Ahoy'" in Rotterdam, Netherlands. It was produced by Stage Entertainment/Joop van den Ende Theatreproductions. There were seven shows in a row, with 15.000 sold seats every night.

In 2004 they revived this concept with the show Musicals in Ahoy 2004, Musical meets Movie. A run of nine shows. In 2006 they revived this concept again.

Also international stars like Vanessa Williams performed in the Musicals in Ahoy shows.

== Cast ==
Soloists	Nederlands Musical Ensemble
Simone Kleinsma	Nadine de Boer
Stanley Burleson	Frank Bos
Caselyn Francisco	Moniek van Gils
Joke de Kruijf	Nina Groos
Willem Nijholt	Marieke Hamer
Linda Wagenmakers	Rudy Hellewegen
Liesbeth List	Ferry Hogeboom
Pia Douwes	Sander Jan Klerk
Laura Vlasblom	Fabienne Leenart
Henk Poort	Marije Nieuwenhuis
Mathilde Santing	Gitty Pregers
Maaike Widdershoven	Marloes van Reijzen
Bastiaan Ragas	Peter Rijnbeek
Danny de Munk	Sarah Verbruggen
Chantal Janzen	Gerlinde Vliegenthart
Chaira Borderslee	Kelvin Wormgoor
Ryan van den Akker	Suzanne van Delft
Tony Neef	Annick van der Hoeven
Antje Monteiro	Fleur Hendriks
