= Sonny Boy Williamson =

Sonny Boy Williamson may refer to either of the two 20th-century American blues harmonica players, who both recorded in Chicago:

- Sonny Boy Williamson I (1914–1948), born John Lee Curtis Williamson
- Sonny Boy Williamson II (c. 1912–1965), born Alex Ford; known as Aleck "Rice" Miller, among other names
