= Jane Wilhelms =

American computer scientist

Jane Patricia Wilhelms (died March 26, 2005) was an American biologist and computer scientist known for her contributions to computer graphics, including work on anatomical simulation of humans and animals and collision detection in computer animation, and isosurfaces and volume rendering in scientific visualization. She was a professor of computer science at the University of California, Santa Cruz.

== Education and career ==
Wilhelms was originally a biologist, with a bachelor's degree in zoology from the University of Wisconsin–Madison and a master's degree from Stanford University. She worked for many years as a junior college instructor of anatomy and physiology before returning to graduate study in computer science, at the University of California, Berkeley, in the 1980s. There, she also had the opportunity to consult at Lucasfilm as a graphics programmer. She earned a second master's degree there, and completed her Ph.D. in 1985, under the supervision of Brian A. Barsky. Her dissertation was Graphical Simulation of the Motion of Articulated Bodies Such as Humans and Robots, with Particular Emphasis on the Use of Dynamic Analysis.

She joined the faculty at the University of California, Santa Cruz in 1985, and became project director of the UC Santa Cruz Scientific Visualization Laboratory. She died of cancer on March 26, 2005, at age 56.
