= David Williamson (disambiguation) =

David Williamson (born 1942) is an Australian playwright.

David Williamson may also refer to:

- David Williamson, Baron Williamson of Horton (1934–2015), British and European civil servant
- David Williamson (businessman) (born 1961), Executive Director of Operations at Newcastle United Football Club
- David Williamson (footballer) (born 1975), Hong Kong-born footballer
- David Williamson (soldier) (1752–1814), American colonel in the Pennsylvania militia during the Revolutionary War
- David Williamson (British politician) (1868–1955), British editor and politician
- David G. Williamson (born 1940), British historian
- David P. Williamson (born 1967), professor of operations research at Cornell University
- David Williamson, Lord Balgray (1761–1837), Senator of the College of Justice in Scotland
- David Theodore Nelson Williamson (1923–1992), British electronics engineer
- David Williamson (magician) (born 1961), stage magician
- David Williamson (minister) (c. 1634–1706), Scottish minister and Covenanter
- Dave Williamson, stand-up comedian

== See also ==
- David Williamson Carroll (1816–1905), Arkansas politician
