= Richard Williamson (disambiguation) =

Richard Williamson (1940–2025) was an English traditionalist Catholic bishop, formerly of the Society of St. Pius X.

Richard Williamson may also refer to:

- Richard Williamson (American football) (1941–2015), American football player and coach
- Richard Williamson (sailor) (born 1944), Australian Olympic sailor
- Richard T. Williamson (born 1958), American non-fiction writer
- Richard S. Williamson (1949–2013), US special envoy to Sudan and Chairman of the Illinois Republican Party
- Rich Williamson (filmmaker), Canadian film director
- Richie Williamson (born 1973), New South Wales politician

== See also ==
- Richard Williams (disambiguation)
- William Richard Williamson (1872–1958), English adventurer and oil company representative
