= Michael Williamson =

Michael Williamson may refer to:

- Mike Williamson (broadcaster) (1928-2019), Australian rules football commentator and broadcaster
- Mike Williamson (footballer) (born 1983), English footballer
- Michael Williamson (Australian unionist) (born 1953), Australian unionist and convicted fraudster
- Michael Williamson (photographer) (born 1957), American photographer
- Michael Z. Williamson (born 1967), American science fiction and military-fiction author
- Michael Williamson (swimmer) (born 1981), Irish swimmer
