= Charlie Williamson (footballer, born 1956) =

Scottish footballer

Personal information
- Full name: Charles Williamson
- Date of birth: 12 April 1956 (age 70)
- Place of birth: Falkirk, Scotland
- Position: Left back

Senior career*
Years	Team	Apps	(Gls)
1974–1977	Bristol City	0	(0)
1976–1977	→ Torquay United (loan)	5	(0)
1977–1978	Falkirk	15	(1)
Total		20	(1)
- * Club domestic league appearances and goals

Charles Williamson (born 12 April 1956) is a Scottish former professional footballer who played in the Football League, as a defender.
