= Simon Willson =

Hong Kong radio actor

Simon Willson (Aka DJ Simon) is a Hong Kong radio producer, club DJ and actor.

Born in Bath, UK, he is the youngest son of former world 16m glider champion and renowned Combined Services and Hong Kong cricketer B.J. Willson.{{Citation needed|reason=Can't find reliable info about B.J. Willson|date=August 2024}}

Raised in Hong Kong, Willson has been a part of the Asian dance scene since the early eighties. In cinema, he's best known as the vampire in Cinema City's 1987 production "Vampire's Breakfast."

By early 1989 Willson was the producer/presenter of "Night Music" 4 weekly late night radio shows on RTHK (Radio Television Hong Kong) Radio 3. This was ended by a serious motorcycle accident.

In addition to hosting Sunset Sounds and Simon's Rolled Gold on RTHK Radio 3, Willson has been the DJ of the Hong Kong Sevens since 2011.
