= Willeke Wendrich =

American egyptologist

Willemina Zwanida "Willeke" Wendrich (born 13 September 1961, Haarlem) is a Dutch-American Egyptologist and archaeologist. She is Professor and Joan Silsbee Chair of African Cultural Archaeology in the Near Eastern Language & Cultures Department at the University of California, Los Angeles. Since 2016 she is the Director of the Cotsen Institute of Archaeology.

== Education ==
Wendrich completed her Ph.D. at the Centre for Asian, African and Amerindian Studies (CNWS) at Leiden University in the Netherlands in 1993. The topic of her dissertation was Ethnoarchaeology and the social context of Ancient Egyptian basketry, which was subsequently published as The World According to Basketry by the Cotsen Institute of Archaeology (CIoA) Press in June 1999. From 1995 to 1999 Wendrich was an assistant professor of Egyptian archaeology at Leiden University, stationed at the Netherlands Institute for Archaeology and Arabic Studies in Cairo. In 2000, Wendrich moved to Los Angeles and became an assistant professor in the Department of Near Eastern Languages and Cultures at UCLA. She held the position of Associate Professor of Egyptian Archaeology in the same department from 2003-2009. During her tenure at UCLA, Wendrich became the Faculty Director of the UCLA Digital Humanities Incubator Group, and, in 2013, the Faculty Director of the Center for Digital Humanities at UCLA. She also served as the Co-director of the Keck Digital Cultural Mapping Program at UCLA from 2008 until 2012. At the Cotsen Institute of Archaeology, Wendrich held the position of Editorial Director of the Cotsen Institute of Archaeology Press (CIoA) from 2011 until 2016.

== Research ==
Wendrich has participated in projects at Çatal Höyük, Amarna, Elephantine, and Qasr Ibrim and directed excavations of her own. From 1994 to 2002, she was co-director of excavations at the Roman port city of Berenike on the Egyptian Red Sea coast with Prof. Sidebotham from the University of Delaware. From 2003 until 2014, Wendrich has been working as co-director of the excavations in the Fayum region of Egypt, on the North shore of Lake Qarun in cooperation with René Cappers of the Rijksuniversiteit Groningen and Simon Holdaway of the University of Auckland on the URU. The Fayum Project URU includes excavation work on both a variety of Neolithic and Graeco-Roman period sites, including Karanis (Kom Aushim). Work on the Neolithic materials resulted in the discovery of the evidence for farming in Egypt at the site Kom K. Wendrich has been involved in archaeological education as the chairperson of the board of directors at the Institute for Field Research. Since 2015, She has been Director of the UCLA Shire Archaeological Project in Shire, Ethiopia.

Wendrich's field research has been centered on community-involvement initiatives, the most notable of which includes planning and designing several exhibitions highlighting the material culture of the indigenous Ababda nomadic communities since 1997 at the site museum in Berenike (1997), the Netherlands-Flemish Institute in Cairo (1999), the World Museum in Rotterdam, The Netherlands (2001), and the design and planning of the exhibit of Ababda Cultural Heritage Center in Wadi Gemal National Park in collaboration with Gabriel Mikhail in 2006. In 2012, she also planned the restoration and design of the "Beyt Sobek" Visitor's center at Karanis in the Fayum, which was the old 1920s excavation house.

== Service ==
In addition to her field research, Wendrich has been involved in a number of digital humanities initiatives at UCLA. Since 2005, She is Editor-in-Chief of the UCLA Encyclopedia of Egyptology, a collaborative project aimed at providing accurate, open-source articles on a wide range of Egyptological topics. In collaboration with members of the Deutsches Archäologisches Institut, Kairo, Wendrich developed the Aegeron (Ancient Egyptian Architecture Online) project.

Wendrich is also serving on many professional committees and editorial boards. Since 2016, she is an Academic Advisory Board Member of Museo Egizio, Turin, Italy. She is also a Co-chair Board of Governors of the Institute for Field Research, and Vice-President (former President) of the International Association of Egyptologists. Her editorial positions include editorial board membership of the Journal of Egyptian Archaeology, Journal of Computer Applications in Archaeology, African Archaeology Review, and the Polish Archaeological Series of the Polish Centre of Mediterranean Archaeology, University of Warsaw.
