= Liz Williamson =

Australian textile artist and educator

- Born: Elizabeth Blanche Williamson; 9 June 1949; Carisbrook, Victoria, Australia
- Died: 15 August 2024 (aged 75); Sydney, New South Wales
- Education: University of New South Wales
- Known for: Weaving, textile education

Elizabeth Blanche Williamson (9 June 1949 – 15 August 2024), better known as Liz Williamson, was an Australian textile artist. She founded education in textiles at the College of Fine Arts in Sydney.

== Early life and education ==
Williamson was born in Carisbrook, Victoria on 9 June 1949. At the University of Melbourne she completed a bachelor of economics and commerce degree (1967–1970).

While travelling through Southeast Asia, Central Asia and Europe (1973–1977), she observed how whole communities were involved in the production of textiles, "each artisan – whether a farmer, spinner, dyer, weaver, embroider or tailor – plays a significant part in the whole".

She took a weaving course in Castlemaine in 1977, which led her to study for a bachelor degree in textile design at Royal Melbourne Institute of Technology (now RMIT University). She later graduated with a master of fine art from the University of New South Wales.

== Career ==
Williamson created her first piece of weaving using wool from Lochinver, the farm in Victoria where she grew up. The wool was spun by hand and coloured with plant dye. This practice underpinned her artistic career.

Having founded education in textiles in 1997 at the College of Fine Arts in Paddington, Sydney, now part of the University of New South Wales, she served as Head of the Design School (2008–2013) and went on lecturing in textiles until 2020.

Williamson contributed to a number of exhibitions, including the 8th International Triennale of Tapestry held in Lodz, Poland in 1995 and the 1998 International Lace Exhibition at the Powerhouse Museum in Sydney.

Under her leadership, her students contributed artworks to decorate the Sydney Children's Hospital in 1998. Ten years later, College students undertook a project to repurpose street banners that had promoted City of Sydney events to create new items, rather than landfill.

In 2007 she was commissioned to design fabric to upholster furniture and cover cushions for Government House, Sydney.

Her work is held in the National Gallery of Australia, the National Gallery of Victoria and the Art Gallery of South Australia.

Williamson died on 15 August 2024.

Garland magazine dedicated its September 2024 issue to her memory. The edition was edited by Robyn Phelan and coincided with the 60th anniversary of the World Crafts Council.
