= Wilson (name) =

Name

Wilson is a British and Irish surname, common in the English-speaking world, with several distinct origins. The name is derived from a patronymic form of Will, a popular medieval name. The medieval Will is derived from any of several names containing Old Norse or the first Germanic element wil, meaning “will” or "desire".

The surname Wilson is first recorded in England as Willeson in 1324 and in Scotland as Wulson in 1405.

It is the seventh most common surname in England, and tenth most common in the United States, occurring 783,051 times as of 2000.

Wilson is the third most common surname in Scotland.

Wilson can also be a given name.

== See also ==
- Willson, a variant of the surname
- Williamson, another variant of the surname
- Williams, a surname that also means "son of William"
- List of people with surname Wilson
- List of people with given name Wilson
