= Elma =

Elma or ELMA may refer to:

== Places ==
=== United States ===
- Elma, Iowa, a city in the US
- Elma, New York, a town in the US
  - Elma Center, New York
  - Elma (hamlet), New York, a hamlet in the town
- Elma, Washington, a city in the US
- Elma Township, Richland County, North Dakota, in Richland County, North Dakota, US
- Elma, Virginia, an unincorporated community in the US

=== Elsewhere ===
- Elma, Manitoba, a community in Canada
  - Elma railway station
- Elma (river), a river of Poland

== People ==
=== Given name ===
- Elma (given name)
- Elma G. Albert, Justice of the Iowa Supreme Court
- Elma Bellini (1954–2018), New York Supreme Court Justice
- Elma Campbell (1901–1983), Scottish nationalist activist
- Elma Danielsson (1865–1936), Swedish politician
- Elma Tryphosa Dangerfield (1907–2006), British journalist and Liberal Party politician
- Elma Davis (born 1968), South African international lawn bowler
- Elma de Vries (born 1983), Dutch speed skater
- Elma Dienda (born 1964), Namibian politician
- Elma Salinas Ender (born 1953), Texan judge
- Elma Francois (1897–1944), Trinidadian political activist
- Elma González (born 1942), Mexican-American biologist
- Elma Gove (1832–1921), American painter
- Elma van Haren (born 1954), Dutch poet
- Elma Holder, American elder rights activist
- Elma Karlowa (1932–1994), Yugoslav actress
- Elma Lewis (1921–2004), American arts educator
- Elma Maua (1948–2010), New Zealand journalist
- Elma Miller (born 1954), Canadian musician, composer, writer and educator
- Elma Mitchell (1919–2000), British poet
- Elma Muros (born 1967), Filipina track and field athlete
- Elma Napier (1892–1973), Dominican writer and politician
- Elma Sandford-Morgan (1890–1983), Australian physician
- Elma Sinanović (born 1974), Serbian Bosniak singer
- Elma Soiron (1918–2016), English actress
- Elma Steck (1923–2014), American professional baseball player
- Elma Ström (1822–1889), Swedish opera singer
- Elma Stuckey (1907–1988), African-American poet
- Elma Yerburgh (1864–1946), owner and chairman of the Thwaites Brewery company
- Elma Mary Williams (1913–1971), British author

=== Surname ===
- Fikri Elma (died 1999), Turkish footballer
- Ouidad Elma, French-Moroccan actress
- Yağmur Arzu Elma (born 1996), Turkish female water polo player

== Fictional characters ==
- Elma Leivonen, a fictional character from the anime/manga series Strike Witches
- Elma, a fictional character from the video game Xenoblade Chronicles X
- Elma, a fictional character from the anime/manga series Miss Kobayashi's Dragon Maid
- Elma York, a fictional character from the science fiction novel The Calculating Stars
- Elma Radnor, a fictional character from the 1987 movie Matewan

== Companies ==
- Elma Electronic, a Swiss electronics company
- Empresa Líneas Marítimas Argentinas, a defunct Argentine cargo shipping line
- European Languages and Movies in America

== Other uses ==
- Elma (album), 2019 album by Yorushika
- Elma (gastropod), genus of land snails in the family Streptaxidae
- European land mammal age, former name of the European Land Mammal Mega Zone
