= Elma (given name) =

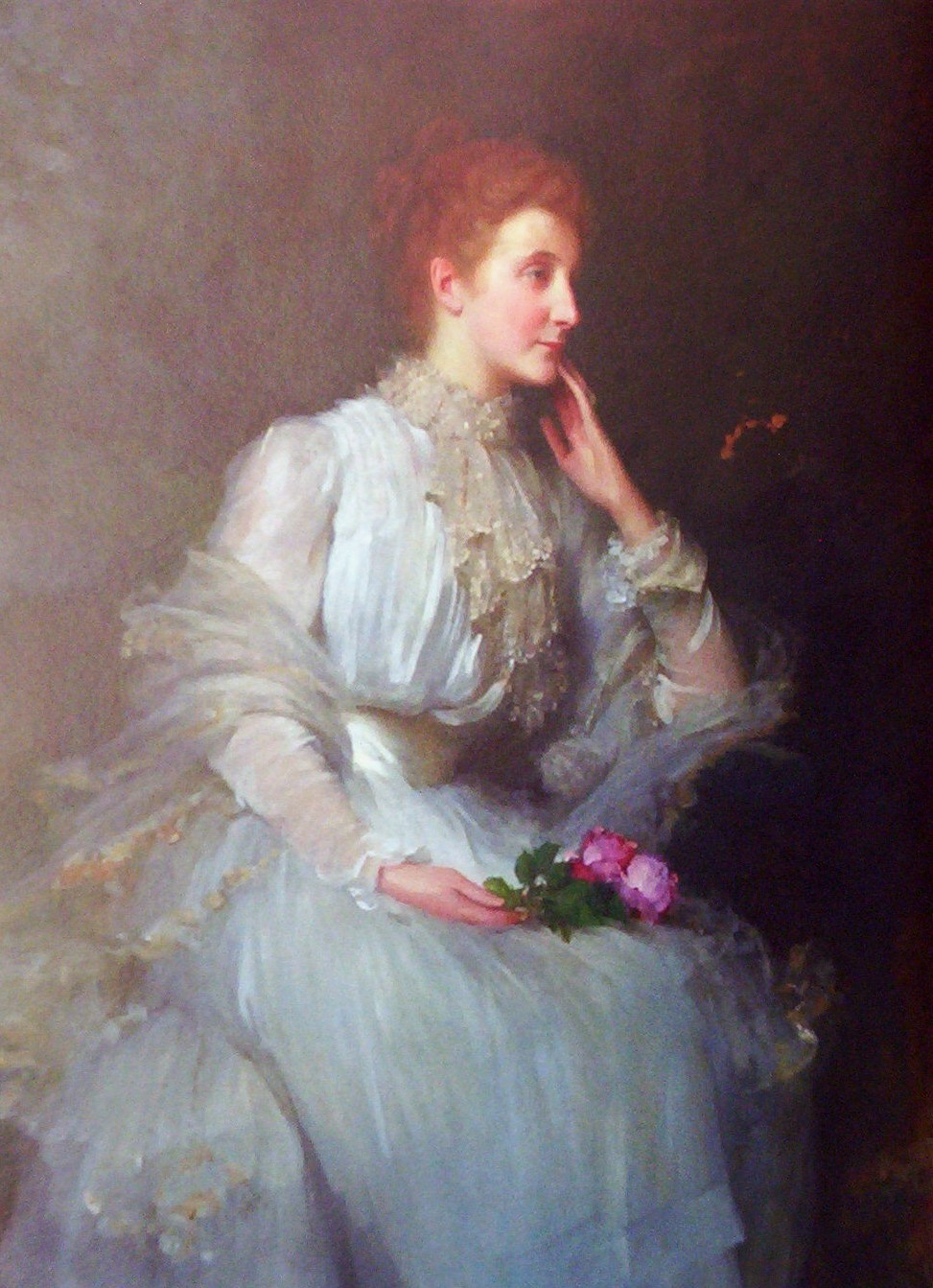
- English businesswoman and public benefactor Elma Yerburgh (1864–1946)
- Gender: Primarily feminine

Origin
- Meaning: Feminine form of Elmer, short form of Wilhelmina or various names ending in -elma

Other names
- Related names: Alma, Elmer, Elmira, Helma, Wilhelmina

Elma is a primarily feminine given name of various origins.

== Usage ==
As an English name, it is considered a feminine version of the name Elmer, or a combination of the names Elizabeth and Mary, a diminutive form of Wilhelmina and various names ending in -elma, or a variant of Alma, Elmira, or Helma.

In the Balkans, Elma is popular among Bosniaks in the former Yugoslav nations. The name has been among the 100 most popular names for girls born in Bosnia and Herzegovina between 2009 and 2024. In this region, the male equivalent is Elmin.

In Brazil, Elma was among the 1,000 most popular names for girls born between 1930 and 1980. In the United States, it was among the 1,000 most popular names for girls born in the United States between 1880 and 1958.

== Women ==
- Elma Bellini (1954–2018), American judge
- Elma Bulla (1913–1980), Hungarian stage and film actress
- Wilhelmina "Elma" Campbell (1901–1983), Scottish nationalist activist
- Elma Tryphosa Dangerfield (1907–2006), British journalist, writer, campaigner and Liberal Party politician
- Elma Danielsson (1865–1936), Swedish journalist and politician
- Elma Davis (1968–2019), South African international lawn bowler
- Elma de Vries (born 1983), Dutch marathon speed skater and inline speed skater
- Elma Dienda (born 1964), South African-born Namibian politician and teacher
- Elma Salinas Ender (born 1953), American attorney and judge
- Elma Francois (1897–1944), Trinidadian and Tobagonian Afrocentric Socialist political activist
- Elma Gada Kris, Australian dancer and choreographer of Aboriginal Australian descent
- Elma González (born 1942), Mexican-born American plant cell biologist
- Elma Gove (1832–1921), American painter
- Elma Halilcevic (born 2000), Danish handball player of Bosnian descent
- Elma Holder, American elder rights activist
- Elizabeth "Elma" Innes (1921–2015), Scottish paediatric haematologist
- Elma Karlowa (1932–1994), Yugoslav film and television actress
- Elma Lewis (1921–2004), American arts educator and the founder of the National Center of Afro-American Artists and The Elma Lewis School of Fine Arts
- Elma Maua (1948–2010), Cook Islands-born New Zealand journalist and editor
- Elma Mbadiwe, Nigerian actress
- Elma Miller (born 1954), Canadian musician, composer, writer and educator
- Elma Mitchell (1919–2000), Scottish poet
- Elma Muros (born 1967), Filipina former track and field athlete
- Elma Napier (née Gordon-Cumming; 1892–1973), Scottish-born writer and politician who spent most of her life in Dominica
- Elma N'For (born 1995), Cameroonian footballer
- Elma Parsamyan (born 1929), Soviet and Armenian astrophysicist and astronomer
- Elma Postma (born 1978), South African actress and presenter
- Elma Rabe, South African politician
- Elma Roach (1897–1942), Australian modernist painter and woodworker
- Elma Saiz (born 1975), Spanish politician
- Elma Sandford-Morgan (1890–1983), Australian physician who practised medicine in India and Iraq during the 1920s
- Elma Shemsovikj (born 1999), Macedonian footballer
- Elma Soiron (1918–2016), English actress
- Elma Steck (1923–2014), American women's baseball player
- Elma Ström (1822–1889), Swedish opera singer
- Elma Stuckey (1907–1988), American poet and school teacher of African-American descent
- Elma van Haren (born 1954), Dutch poet
- Elma Mary Williams (1913–1971), British writer
- Elma Yerburgh (née Thwaites; 1864–1946), English businesswoman and public benefactor

== Men ==
- Elma G. Albert (1866–1942), American judge
