= Dennis Anderson (disambiguation) =

Dennis Anderson (born 1960) is an American monster truck driver.

Dennis Anderson may also refer to:

- Dennis Anderson (politician) (1949–2019), former provincial level politician from Alberta, Canada
- Dennis Henry Anderson (1866–1952), African American Methodist minister, educator, and author
- Dennis LeRoy Anderson, DWI offender with motorized recliner

== See also ==
- Dennis Dengsø Andersen (born 1978), Danish sailor
- Dennis Andersson (born 1991), Swedish speedway rider
