= Marshall W. Taylor =

Marshall W. Taylor may refer to:

- Marshall Walter Taylor, (1878–1932), US cyclist
- Rev. Marshall W. Taylor (minister), author of "Plantation Melodies, Book of Negro Folk Songs", published in 1882
