= Walden College =

Walden College may refer to:

- Final name of the former Walden University (Tennessee) in Nashville (1922–1925)
- A college in the Doonesbury comic (Doonesbury §Walden College)

== See also ==
- Walden University, a private online for-profit university headquartered in Minneapolis, Minnesota
