= Elmin =

- Gender: Male

Other gender
- Feminine: Elmina, Elma

Origin
- Meaning: Truthful

Other names
- Variant form: Almin

Elmin is a male given name.

In the Balkans, Elmin is popular among Bosniaks in the former Yugoslav nations. The name is a modification to the name Emin, and it holds the same meaning of "truthful." The female equivalent to the name can either be Elmina (for example, Elmina Moisan) or Elma (for example, Elma Halilcevic).

== Given name ==
- Elmin Kurbegović (born 1987), Bosnian footballer
- Elmin Marukić (born 1993), Serbian footballer
- Elmin Rastoder (born 2001), Swiss footballer of Bosnian descent
