= Riverside Cemetery (Jackson, Tennessee) =

Historic cemetery in Madison County, Tennessee

- U.S. National Register of Historic Places
- Location within Tennessee Location within the United States
- Location: 300 Riverside Dr, Jackson, Tennessee
- Coordinates: 35°36′38″N 88°49′31″W
- Area: 10.5 acres (4.2 ha)
- Built: 1824
- NRHP reference No.: 03000394
- Added to NRHP: May 9, 2003

Riverside Cemetery is a cemetery located in Jackson, Tennessee. It is located few blocks south of the Madison County Courthouse, separated from Riverside Drive by a five-foot-high red brick wall. Riverside Cemetery was listed in the National Register of Historic Places on 9 May 2003.

== History ==
The City of Jackson established Riverside Cemetery in 1824 to replace the original municipal graveyard founded a few years earlier. Most remains from the earlier cemetery were reinterred at Riverside, either when it opened or in 1871–72. The oldest legible marker is for Mary Jane Butler (died 1824). Riverside Cemetery holds approximately 4,000 graves, but only 3,000 markers remain. It is estimated that there are 200 unmarked burials, including approximately 100 Confederate soldiers who died during the war, plus slaves buried prior to 1865. Riverside continues to accept a limited number of burials from families whose plots have space.

== Notable burials ==
- Isaac Lane (1834–1937), American bishop and namesake of Lane College
- James Franklin Lane (1874–1944), American educator and college president

== See also ==
- List of cemeteries in Tennessee.
