= Llangynfelyn =

Community in Ceredigion, Wales

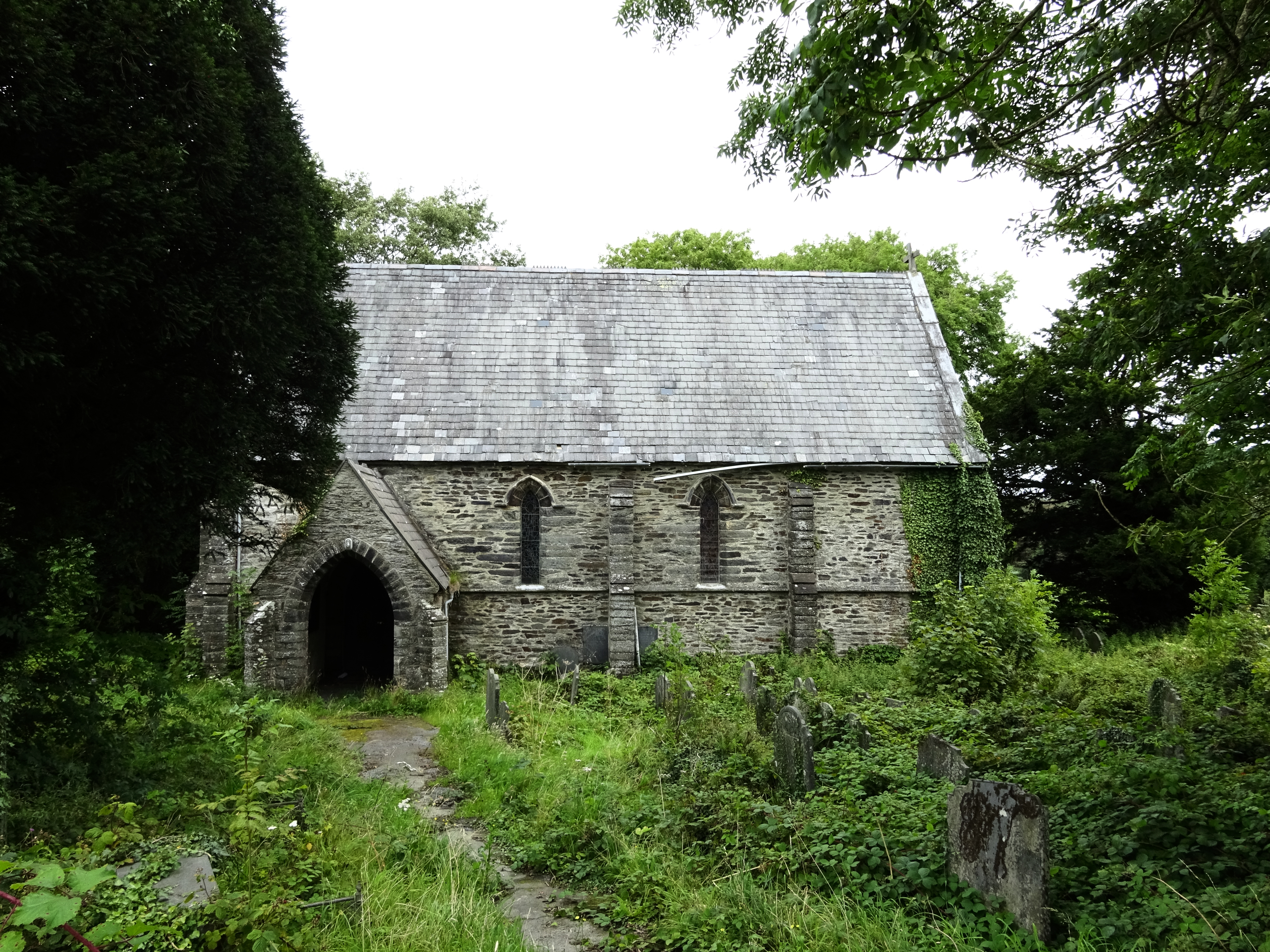
- St Cynfelyn's Church

- Location within Ceredigion
- Area: 23.03 km^{2} (8.89 sq mi)
- Population: 587 (2011)
  - Density: 25/km^{2} (65/sq mi)
- OS grid reference: SN642920
- Principal area: Ceredigion
- Country: Wales
- Sovereign state: United Kingdom
- Post town: Machynlleth
- Postcode district: SY20
- Police: Dyfed-Powys
- Fire: Mid and West Wales
- Ambulance: Welsh
- UK Parliament: Ceredigion Preseli
- Senedd Cymru – Welsh Parliament: Ceredigion Penfro
- List of places UK Wales Ceredigion 52.509°N 4.001°W Community map: Map of the community

Llangynfelyn is a community in Ceredigion, Wales, midway between Aberystwyth and Machynlleth. It stretches from the Leri estuary in the west to Moel y Llyn in the east, and from Lodge Park in the north to Talybont on the A487 to the south; the total area is 9 square miles (23 km^{2}). The population in 2001 was 641, falling to 587 at the 2011 Census. The parish includes Llangynfelyn, Tre-Taliesin, Tre'r Ddôl and Craig y Penrhyn. The parish is named after the parish church of St Cynfelyn.

Various alternate spellings are used, particularly Llancynfelyn and Llancynfelin.

Llangynfelyn Community Council (Cyngor Cymuned Llangynfelyn) serves the communities of Llangynfelyn, Tre'r Ddol and Tre'r Taliesin. The council has nine members and meets monthly. Llangynfelyn Community Council is part of the Ceulanamaesmawr Ward. Catrin M S Davies was elected as the County Councillor for the ward in May 2022.

== Tre'r Ddôl ==
Soar Chapel in Tre'r Ddôl was formerly the site of the Hen Gapel (Old Chapel) Museum, a branch of the Welsh National Folk Museum which closed in the 1990s. The museum was created in the late 1960s by the academic R J Thomas, editor of the Geiriadur Prifysgol Cymru. Soar Chapel was chosen for its links with Humphrey Rowland Jones (1832–1895), who had begun the 1858–60 Welsh revival there.

The poet and farmer, Dic Jones, and the writer Elma Mary Williams were born in Tre'r Ddôl.
