= Harvey C. Russell Sr. =

American educator, academic administrator (1883–1949)

Harvey Clarence Russell Sr.

2nd President of West Kentucky Industrial College
- In office 1937–1938
- Preceded by: Dennis Henry Anderson

Personal details
- Born: Harvey Clarence Russell; June 7, 1883 Bloomfield, Kentucky, U.S.
- Died: September 21, 1949 (aged 66) Louisville, Kentucky, U.S.
- Resting place: Eastern Cemetery
- Spouse(s): Harriet Vance Tucker; Julia Jones
- Children: 7, including Harvey C. Russell Jr.
- Education: Kentucky State University, Simmons College of Kentucky, University of Cincinnati

Harvey Clarence Russell Sr. (June 7, 1883 – September 21, 1949) was an American educator, and academic administrator. He served as the dean of Kentucky State College (now Kentucky State University) and president of West Kentucky Industrial College (now West Kentucky Community and Technical College) in Paducah, Kentucky.

He is the namesake of the Russell neighborhood in Louisville, Kentucky, among other honors.

== Life and career ==
Harvey Clarence Russell was born on June 7, 1883, in Bloomfield, Kentucky. Russell was educated at the Kentucky State Normal School (now Kentucky State University), Simmons University (now Simmons College of Kentucky), and the University of Cincinnati (M.Ed. 1929).

Russell Sr. served as the dean of Kentucky State College (now Kentucky State University). He was president of West Kentucky Industrial College (now West Kentucky Community and Technical College) in Paducah, Kentucky from 1937 to 1938.

He served as president of the Kentucky Negro Educational Association.

== Death and legacy ==
Russell Sr. died at his home on September 21, 1949, in Louisville, Kentucky.

He is the namesake of the former Harvey C. Russell Junior High School, and the Russell neighborhood in Louisville, Kentucky. A Harvey Street in Frankfort, Kentucky was suggested in his honor in 1953, on the campus of Kentucky State University. In 2019, the Harvey C. Russell, Sr. memorial mural was completed in Louisville.

== Publications ==
- The Kentucky Negro Education Association, 1877–1946. Norfolk, VA: Guide Quality Press. 1946. OCLC 19707408.
