= Parsamian 21 =

Cometary reflection nebula in the constellation Aquila

Reflection nebula

Observation data: J2000 epoch
- Right ascension: 19^{h} 29^{m} 0.87^{s}
- Declination: +39° 38′ 42.9″
- Distance: (~400 pc) ~1,304 ly
- Constellation: Aquila
- Designations: 2MASS J19290085+0938429, Gaia DR3 4308446999329032064, GN 19.26.6, HH 221, IRAS 19266+0932, Parsamyan 21, PP 88, TIC 134514593, UCAC4 499-107365, WISEA J192900.85+093842.5, WISE J192900.85+093842.7

Parsamian 21 (also spelled Parsamyan 21) is a cometary reflection nebula approximately 400 pc (1,304 ly) away in the constellation Aquila. The nebula was discovered by Armenian astronomer Elma Parsamian in 1965 and is one of 23 cometary nebulae discovered by her.

Parsamian 21 is highly polarized and illuminated by its central star, designated as HBC 687. The nebula exhibits a fan-like structure with two highly illuminated bands on both sides. Two parallel bands also extend across the head of the nebula and the central star, formed by aligned grains in the circumstellar disc surrounding the central star. The polarization structure of Parsamian 21 is very similar to well-studied cometary nebulae like NGC 2261 and NGC 6729. A study utilizing an F814W filter revealed a faint southern structure. The northern structure that makes up most of Parsamian 21 features a compact northern knot and a bowed shaped southern knot. A study reported 2-3 mag brightness fluctuations in the B band between 1966 and 1990. Generally, Parsamian 21 fluctuates very little and has remained constant at roughly 15 per cent, No significant fluctuations have been detected in longer wavelengths.

Cental star HBC 687 is a low-mass, pre-main sequence FU Orionis star with an edge-on circumstellar disc. The disc appears to be flat, extending between 48 and 360 au from the central star. An envelope of gas with a solar mass of approximately 0.01 M_{☉} surrounds HBC 687. This envelope is expanding at about 120 km/sec away from the central star.
