= Roy Skinner =

American basketball coach (1930–2010)

Biographical details
- Born: April 17, 1930; Paducah, Kentucky
- Died: October 25, 2010 (aged 80); Nashville, Tennessee

Playing career
- ?–1952: Presbyterian

Coaching career (HC unless noted)
- 1955–1957: Paducah JC
- 1957–1958: Vanderbilt (assistant)
- 1958–1959: Vanderbilt (acting HC)
- 1959–1961: Vanderbilt (assistant)
- 1961–1976: Vanderbilt

Head coaching record
- Overall: 278–135 (.673)

Accomplishments and honors

Championships
- 2 SEC regular season (1965, 1974)

Awards
- 4× SEC Coach of the Year (1965, 1967, 1974, 1976)

Roy Gene Skinner (April 17, 1930 – October 25, 2010) was an American basketball coach who was best known for his time as head coach of Vanderbilt Commodores men's basketball. Skinner helped break the racial barrier by recruiting the first African American athlete to play varsity ball for a team in the Southeastern Conference. He has the second-most wins in program history, behind Kevin Stallings.

== Life and career ==
Skinner was born in 1930 in Paducah, Kentucky. He played basketball as a point guard in high school, at Paducah Junior College, and at Presbyterian College, where he earned his undergraduate degree in 1952. His first basketball coaching job was in 1955 at his alma mater Paducah Junior College in 1955 (now part of West Kentucky Community and Technical College).

He was hired by head coach Bob Polk at Vanderbilt as an assistant coach two years later after Skinner led his Paducah team to a win against Vanderbilt's freshman squad. He spent the 1958–59 season as the acting head coach in Polk's absence, and led the team to an overall record of 14–10.

Skinner succeeded Polk as head coach in the 1960–61 season. With the support of Vanderbilt University chancellor G. Alexander Heard, he pursued the recruitment of African American players for the basketball team. The first player to make the team was Perry Wallace, a local schoolboy star at Nashville's Pearl High School, who enrolled at Vanderbilt in 1966 and first started playing for the team in 1967, becoming the Southeastern Conference's first African American varsity player. Skinner faced opposition from alumni who were opposed to integrating the team; Skinner was primarily looking at recruiting Wallace as someone who would be "a great player, and also a great student, a valedictorian" and that the fact that he was making history was a secondary aspect of the choice. Wallace recalled in a 2009 interview that Skinner practically lived at his house from the time he started trying to recruit him while he was a high school junior.

Skinner led the team to the Elite Eight in the 1965 NCAA Division I men's basketball tournament behind a 24–4 record that season, losing to the University of Michigan by two points. Skinner was chosen as coach of the year in the SEC in 1974 by the Associated Press after leading the team to a 23–3 season record, with Skinner receiving seven votes from the 10-member board that selected the winner. Saying that "I don't want to get old being basketball coach", Skinner announced in March 1976 that he would be stepping down as head coach after 16 years and turning the reins over to assistant head coach Wayne Dobbs. Skinner led the Commodores to a 278–135 record during his tenure, the most in school history until Kevin Stallings passed him during the 2013–14 season. He was named SEC coach of the year in 1965, 1967, 1974 and 1976. In 2009, Skinner was inducted into the Vanderbilt Sports Hall of Fame.

== Death ==
Skinner died in Nashville, Tennessee at the age of 80 on October 25, 2010, due to respiratory failure. He was survived by his third wife, Nathleene, as well as by two daughters, three sons and eight grandchildren, all from his first marriage.

== Head coaching record ==
=== College ===
Record table
Season	Team	Overall	Conference	Standing	Postseason
Vanderbilt Commodores (Southeastern Conference) (1958–1959)
1958–59	Vanderbilt	14–10	8–6	T–5th	
Vanderbilt Commodores (Southeastern Conference) (1961–1976)
1961–62	Vanderbilt	12–12	6–8	T–6th	
1962–63	Vanderbilt	16–7	9–5	4th	
1963–64	Vanderbilt	19–6	8–6	T–4th	
1964–65	Vanderbilt	24–4	15–1	1st	NCAA University Division Elite Eight
1965–66	Vanderbilt	22–4	13–3	2nd	
1966–67	Vanderbilt	21–5	14–4	T–2nd	
1967–68	Vanderbilt	20–6	12–6	3rd	
1968–69	Vanderbilt	15–11	9–9	T–5th	
1969–70	Vanderbilt	12–14	8–10	6th	
1970–71	Vanderbilt	13–13	9–9	T–4th	
1971–72	Vanderbilt	16–10	10–8	4th	
1972–73	Vanderbilt	20–6	13–5	T–2nd	
1973–74	Vanderbilt	23–5	13–5	T–1st	NCAA Division I Sweet 16
1974–75	Vanderbilt	15–11	10–8	5th	
1975–76	Vanderbilt	16–11	12–6	3rd	
Vanderbilt:		278–135 (.673)	169–99 (.631)		
Total:		278–135 (.673)			
National champion Postseason invitational champion Conference regular season champion Conference regular season and conference tournament champion Division regular season champion Division regular season and conference tournament champion Conference tournament champion
