= Almin =

Male given name

- Gender: Male

Other gender
- Feminine: Almina

Origin
- Meaning: Truthful

Other names
- Variant form: Elmin
- Related names: Armin

Almin is a male given name.

In the Balkans, Almin is popular among Bosniaks in the former Yugoslav nations. The name is a modification to the name Amin, and it holds the same meaning of "truthful." This region also has a female equivalent: Almina (for example, Almina Hodžić).

== Given name ==
- Almin Kulenović (born 1973), Bosnian footballer
