= Tequila Harris =

American engineer and professor

- Education: Rensselaer Polytechnic Institute; Lane College
- Scientific career
- Workplaces: George W. Woodruff School of Mechanical Engineering

Tequila Harris is an American mechanical engineer and professor. She is Professor of Manufacturing at the George W. Woodruff School of Mechanical Engineering. She works on polymer processing and mechanical system design.

== Education and early career ==
Harris earned her Bachelor's degree at Lane College in 2000. She was a Master's student at the Rensselaer Polytechnic Institute, and became a postgraduate in 2003. In October 2006, Harris graduated with a PhD in Mechanical Engineering. She was awarded the United Negro College Fund Young Alumnus Award of the Year in 2005. She was a National Science Foundation research trainee between 2005 and 2006. She has been received a multiple fellow, such as General Electric Faculty of the Future, Clare Luce Booth Fellow from Henry Luce Foundation, Alliances for Graduate Education and the Professoriate (AGEP) Fellow and Class of 1969 Teaching Fellows.

== Career ==
Harris joined the Georgia Institute of Technology as an assistant professor in 2006 and was promoted to full professor in 2023. She leads the Polymer Thin Film Processing group at Georgia Institute of Technology. She became principal investigator at National Science Foundation CAREER Award between 2010 and 2015. The award let her investigate Proton-exchange membrane fuel cells using theoretical and numerical modelling. She is interested in the interface between materials and substrates. They looked at how mechanical properties (stress, relaxation and shrinkage) impact the durability of membranes. As part of the grant she developed the Educators Leading Energy Conservation and Training Researchers of Diverse Ethnicities (ELECTRoDE) program for minority students and faculty.

She worked with the University of Rhode Island to fabricate environmentally friendly nanoparticles for water purification projects in Jordan. She worked with the Jordan University of Science and Technology to study membrane biofouling due to chemicals and microbes. In 2015 she was accepted as a fellow at the Executive Leadership in Academic Technology and Engineering program at Drexel University.

She attended a ceremony at the White House with Kim Cobb as the National Science Foundation launched a new work-life balance initiatives.

Harris has been featured on the Stories from the NNI podcast of the National Nanotechnology Initiative for her work with polymer thin film manufacturing.

Harris also runs the Highly Advanced Role to Role iManufacturing Group at Georgia Tech that works on the science of scaling thin film from labs to production floors.

== Honors and awards ==
She won a second National Science Foundation award in 2017, allowing her to translate thin film fabrication from the lab to factory floor. She focuses on multi-layer thin film technologies for things such as organic solar cells, transistors and sensors. She is interested in the molecular mechanisms and flaws in fabrication that cause failure in manufacturing. This includes looking at how defects influence transport properties in polymer membrane films. They also look at how fluid flows through porous media. She won the Lockheed Martin Inspirational Young Faculty Award. The Lockheed Martin Award is to recognize young professors who pose a great impact on their students lives and education.

She holds several patents for producing a proton-conducting membrane thin films. She was awarded the International Society of Coating Science and Technology L. E. Scriven Young Investigator Award in 2018. She is the first African-American to win the award since it began in the 1990s.

== Selected publications ==
1. Shrivastava, Naveen K.; Chatterjee, Abheek; A. L. Harris, Tequila (2023). "Manufacturing defects in slot die coated polymer electrolyte membrane for fuel cell application". Chemical Engineering Science. 280: 119051. doi:10.1016Awards.2023.119051
2. Dong, Xiaobo; Lu, David; Harris, Tequila A. L.; Escobar, Isabel C. (2021). "Polymers and Solvents Used in Membrane Fabrication: A Review Focusing on Sustainable Membrane Development". Membranes. 11 (5): 309. doi:10.3390/membranes11050309.
3. Chede, Sneha; Anaya, Nelson M.; Oyanedel-Craver, Vinka; Gorgannejad, Sanam; Harris, Tequila A. L.; Al-Mallahi, Jumana; Abu-Dalo, Muna; Qdais, Hani Abu; Escobar, Isabel C. (2019). "Desalination using low biofouling nanocomposite membranes: From batch-scale to continuous-scale membrane fabrication". Desalination. Nanomaterials for Water Desalination: Recent Advances and Future Challenges. 451: 81–91. doi:10.1016/j.desal.2017.05.007.
4. Bhamidipati, Kanthi Latha; Didari, Sima; Bedell, Prince; Harris, Tequila A. L. (2011). "Wetting phenomena during processing of high-viscosity shear-thinning fluid". Journal of Non-Newtonian Fluid Mechanics. 166 (12): 723–733. doi:10.1016/j.jnnfm.2011.03.009.
