= Wesley Cornelious McClure =

American civil rights activist and educator (1942–2013)

- Born: 1942; Jackson, Tennessee, U.S.
- Died: December 6, 2013; Jackson-Madison County General Hospital, Jackson, Tennessee, U.S.
- Education: Lane College (B.Sc., Mathematics, 1964); University of Virginia (M.S., Mathematics, 1968); University of Virginia (Ed.D., Educational Research, 1970); Harvard University (post-doctoral)
- Occupations: Educator, academic administrator, civil rights activist
- Known for: 9th President of Lane College; President of Virginia State University; Chancellor of Southern University

Wesley Cornelious McClure (1942 – December 6, 2013) was an American civil rights activist and academic administrator. Born in Jackson, Tennessee, he was one of the "Freshman Four", a group of students at Lane College, who staged a sit-in at a Woolworth's lunch counter in Jackson in 1960, protesting racial segregation. He went on to lead three prominent historically black colleges and universities over the course of his academic career. He served as the 9th and longest-serving president of Lane College from 1992 until his death in 2013.

== Early life and education ==
Wesley Cornelious McClure was born in 1942 in Jackson, Tennessee. He graduated from Merry High School in Jackson in 1960.

McClure attended Lane College, where he earned BSc in mathematics in 1964. At Lane, McClure told his classmates that his greatest ambition was to return to Lane as its president, a goal he achieved 32 years later. He got his MSc in mathematics in 1968 and EdD in educational research in 1970, both from the University of Virginia. He subsequently completed a post-doctoral training at Harvard University.

== Civil rights activism ==
=== Woolworth's Sit-In (1960) ===
In the fall of 1960, during his freshman year at Lane College, Dr. McClure joined three fellow students — Shirlene Mercer, Kimmie Davis, and Ernest Brooks, Sr. — in staging a sit-in protest at the Woolworth's lunch counter in downtown Jackson, Tennessee. The group, known as the "Freshman Four," chose to sit at the "whites only" lunch counter in defiance of racial segregation. The activists endured threats, harassment, and had objects thrown at them during the protest.

The protest sparked a broader movement throughout Jackson, as demonstrations spread to other downtown businesses in the fight against Jim Crow laws and racial segregation. Woolworth's was located at the corner of Main Street and North Liberty Street in Jackson — the site where City Hall now stands. The actions of the "Freshman Four" are recognized as a pivotal moment in Jackson's civil rights history, having a lasting impact on generations of African Americans in the city. An exhibit honoring the four pioneers was installed at Jackson City Hall, and a second exhibit was installed at the Old Country Store in Casey Jones Village in February 2020.

=== Broader activism ===
Dr. McClure participated in additional demonstrations in downtown Jackson throughout the civil rights era, seeking equal rights for Black residents. In a 2000 interview with The Jackson Sun, he reflected that the struggles of the 1960s helped him understand the importance of challenging the status quo. He was also a supporter of the NAACP.

Dr. McClure often spoke of the influence of his community on his character: "I'm a product of the hard work, the faith and the persistence of a group of people, mostly deceased now, who refused to let me consider not succeeding."

== Career ==
=== Early career ===
Dr. McClure began his career at Lane College as Assistant to the President and Title III Coordinator from 1970 to 1978. He then served as Dean of Faculty and Instruction at Clark College in Atlanta, Georgia from 1978 to 1979, and as Executive Assistant to the President at St. Augustine's College in Raleigh, North Carolina from 1979 to 1981.

=== Southern University ===
Prior to becoming chancellor, Dr. McClure served as Vice Chancellor of Academic Affairs at Southern University and A&M College from 1981 to 1985. He then served as Chancellor of Southern University and A&M College in Baton Rouge, Louisiana, beginning in 1985, becoming the third chancellor of the Baton Rouge campus. Southern University is one of the largest historically black land-grant universities in the United States.

=== Virginia State University ===
From 1988 to 1992, Dr. McClure served as president of Virginia State University (VSU) in Ettrick, Virginia, a public historically black land-grant university. He was one of several presidents who led the institution during a significant period of growth in American higher education.

=== Lane College (1992–2013) ===
On August 20, 1992, Dr. McClure was named the ninth president of Lane College and assumed the position on September 1, 1992, returning to his alma mater more than three decades after graduating. Lane College is a private historically black college affiliated with the Christian Methodist Episcopal Church in Jackson, Tennessee.

==== Enrollment and institutional growth ====
Under Dr. McClure's leadership, the College experienced significant growth across every dimension of institutional life, including enrollment, financial stability, faculty strength, curriculum expansion, campus infrastructure, and student morale. When he took office in 1992, enrollment stood at approximately 672 students. By Fall 2009, student enrollment had grown to 2,250 — a 235 percent increase — with an approximately equal ratio of male to female students.

==== Campus construction and facilities ====
Dr. McClure oversaw one of the most aggressive periods of campus expansion in Lane College's history. Major projects completed under his presidency include:

- Chambers-McClure Academic Center (CMAC) – Construction of the academic center, which houses the Library/Learning Resource Center, an auditorium, classrooms, seminar rooms, skills laboratories, and a telecommunications center, resumed in 1996 and was completed in 1997. In February 1997, the $5.2 million building was named the Chambers-McClure Academic Center in honor of the two presidents who championed its development.
- Bray Hall renovation – The College's historic 1905 administration building received a complete interior overhaul costing $2.2 million, funded through the U.S. Department of Education, completed in July 2000.
- Campus beautification (1998) – An extensive initiative added a new football practice field, recreational center, archives building, bookstore, spiritual life center, and Health Services Center.
- Residence halls – Between 2006 and 2009, the College constructed five new residence halls: Eastbrooke, The Edens, The Orchards, Alumni Hall, Harper Hall, and Jennie E. Lane Hall, adding hundreds of beds for a growing student population.
- Lane Field (Rothrock Stadium) – In 2006, the College secured the 3,500-seat Rothrock Stadium from the City of Jackson, transforming it into Lane Field, the home of the Lane College Dragons football team.
- WLCD-FM Radio Station – In July 2005, the College acquired an FCC license to operate its own radio station, WLCD-FM, making Lane one of only two private colleges or universities in West Tennessee with its own full-time radio station.
- Science and Business Building – Completed in the summer of 2009, the 42,000-square-foot facility includes 12 classrooms, six laboratories, four lecture rooms with state-of-the-art technology, and the CVS Health Workforce Innovation and Talent Center. In 2023, it was renamed the Wesley C. McClure Science and Business Building.

==== Accreditation ====
Under Dr. McClure's leadership, Lane College's accreditation by the Southern Association of Colleges and Schools was reaffirmed in 2002, with specific commendations for library resources and information technology.

==== Campus and student life ====
Dr. McClure became known for his deep accessibility to students and personal investment in their success. Lane College student government president John'Na Cosby said of him: "We've grown to love Dr. McClure because he hasn't made himself untouchable. He's made himself very close to the student body, and that closeness has allowed each of us to say, 'Wait a minute; he's a product of Lane College, and because President McClure is a product, then I know there are more heights for me to go.'"

Dr. McClure championed academic excellence and practical perseverance. He often said: "People do not succeed unless they make mistakes and keep on working, and that has to be instilled in our young. They have to believe that if they do that, they'll see the results."

Dr. McClure served as president for over 21 years, until his death on December 6, 2013.

== Recognition ==
The city of Jackson, Tennessee honored Dr. McClure when Jackson Mayor Jerry Gist and Madison County Mayor Jimmy Harris issued a proclamation declaring Wesley C. McClure Day. A "Red Carpet Affair: Celebrating the Accomplishments of Dr. Wesley C. McClure" gala was held at the J.F. Lane Physical Health Education Building on campus.

Dr. McClure also engaged actively in the Jackson community throughout his tenure, building relationships with workers, civic leaders, and elected officials.

== Legacy ==
Dr. Wesley Cornelious McClure, Ed.D. died on December 6, 2013, at Jackson-Madison County General Hospital in Jackson, Tennessee. He was 71 years old. He was mourned widely as "a giant" in the words of the Lane College community.

Two major buildings at Lane College bear his name:

- The Chambers-McClure Academic Center (CMAC), the college's primary academic and convocation building, dedicated in February 1997.
- The Wesley C. McClure Science and Business Building, dedicated in a renaming ceremony on March 9, 2023.

Dr. McClure's civil rights legacy is also memorialized in a permanent exhibit at Jackson City Hall honoring the "Freshman Four," the Lane College students who staged the 1960 Woolworth's sit-in.

== Personal life ==
McClure was married to Mary Bradley McClure of Germantown, Tennessee, for 48 years. They had three children: Wesley McClure II, Carter Bradley McClure, and Dessalines McClure Pieh. He was also the father of Toussaint McClure.
