= Isaac Lane =

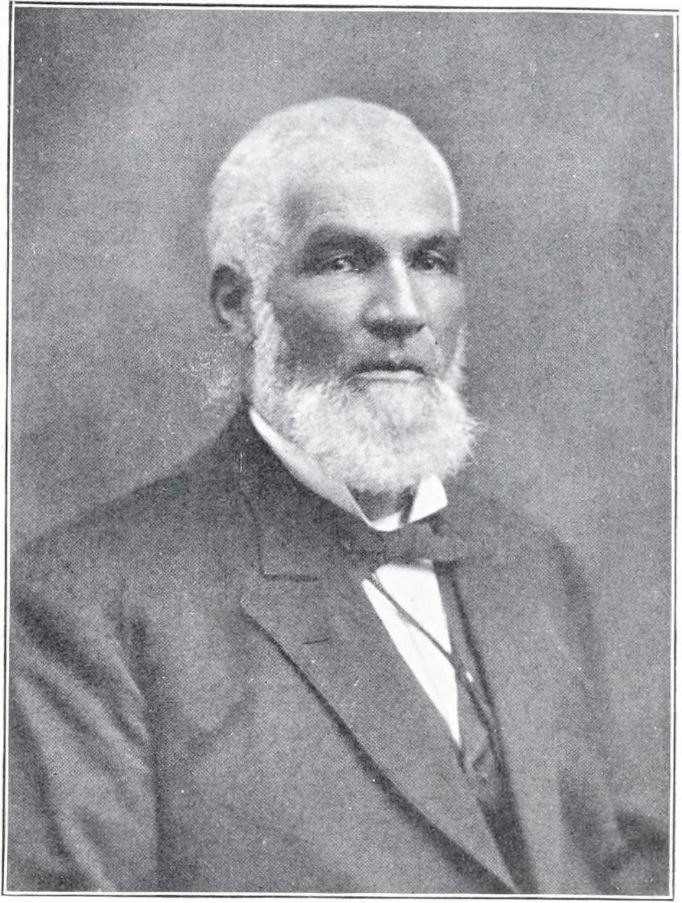
Isaac Lane, c. 1910

Isaac Lane (1834–1937) was an American bishop and educator. He was the fifth bishop of the Colored Methodist Episcopal Church in America. Lane College, established in 1882 in Jackson, Tennessee college was named after Lane.

== Biography ==
Isaac Lane was born March 4, 1834, in Madison County, Tennessee. Lane was born a slave on the plantation of Cullen Lane. At age nineteen Lane married Frances Ann Boyce, also a slave, but from Haywood County. The Lanes had eleven children and several became ministers, educators, and physicians.

In 1870 after freed slaves founded the Colored Methodist Episcopal Church (CME), Lane quickly became a popular minister of the denomination, and in 1873, he was elected as a bishop by the 2nd General Conference of the Christian Methodist Episcopal Church, called together for the purpose of electing a bishop after the death of Bishop Richard Vanderhorst.

In 1882 Lane founded a Colored Methodist Episcopal Church (CME) school in Jackson, and Lane's daughter, Jennie Lane, served as the first teacher and principal of the institution. In preparation for petitioning for the school to gain college status, Lane selected a white Methodist pastor, Thomas F. Saunders, as the first president of the college to ease the process of peer recognition of the school.

In 1907, Lane's son, James Franklin Lane, Ph.D. was chosen as president of Lane College and he served for thirty-seven years.

== Death and legacy ==
In 1937, Bishop Lane died at the age of 102. He is buried at Riverside Cemetery in Jackson, Tennessee, U.S..

In addition to Lane College, a Merchant Marine Victory ship was named in Lane's honor during World War II. The SS Lane Victory is still afloat in San Pedro, California as a museum ship.
