= Walden University (Tennessee) =

American black college (1865–1925)

Coordinates: 36.151°N 86.769°W

- Type: Private
- Active: 1865–1925
- Affiliations: Methodist Episcopal
- Location: Nashville, Tennessee, United States
- Other names: Central Tennessee College (1865–1900); Walden College (1922–1925)

Walden University was a historically black college in Nashville, Tennessee. It was founded in 1865 by missionaries from the Northern United States on behalf of the Methodist Church to serve freedmen. Known as Central Tennessee College from 1865 to 1900, Walden University provided education and professional training to African Americans until 1925.

Meharry Medical College, established as one of Walden's departments in 1876, was the first medical school in the South for African Americans. In 1915, it was chartered separately and became a separate institution. Meharry Medical College remains in existence as one of the constellation of colleges and universities in Nashville.

After regrouping as a junior college in 1922 and offering a two-year associate degree, Walden College closed in 1925 due to financial difficulties and competition with state-run colleges. Since 1935, its second campus (acquired in 1922) has served as Trevecca Nazarene University.

== History ==
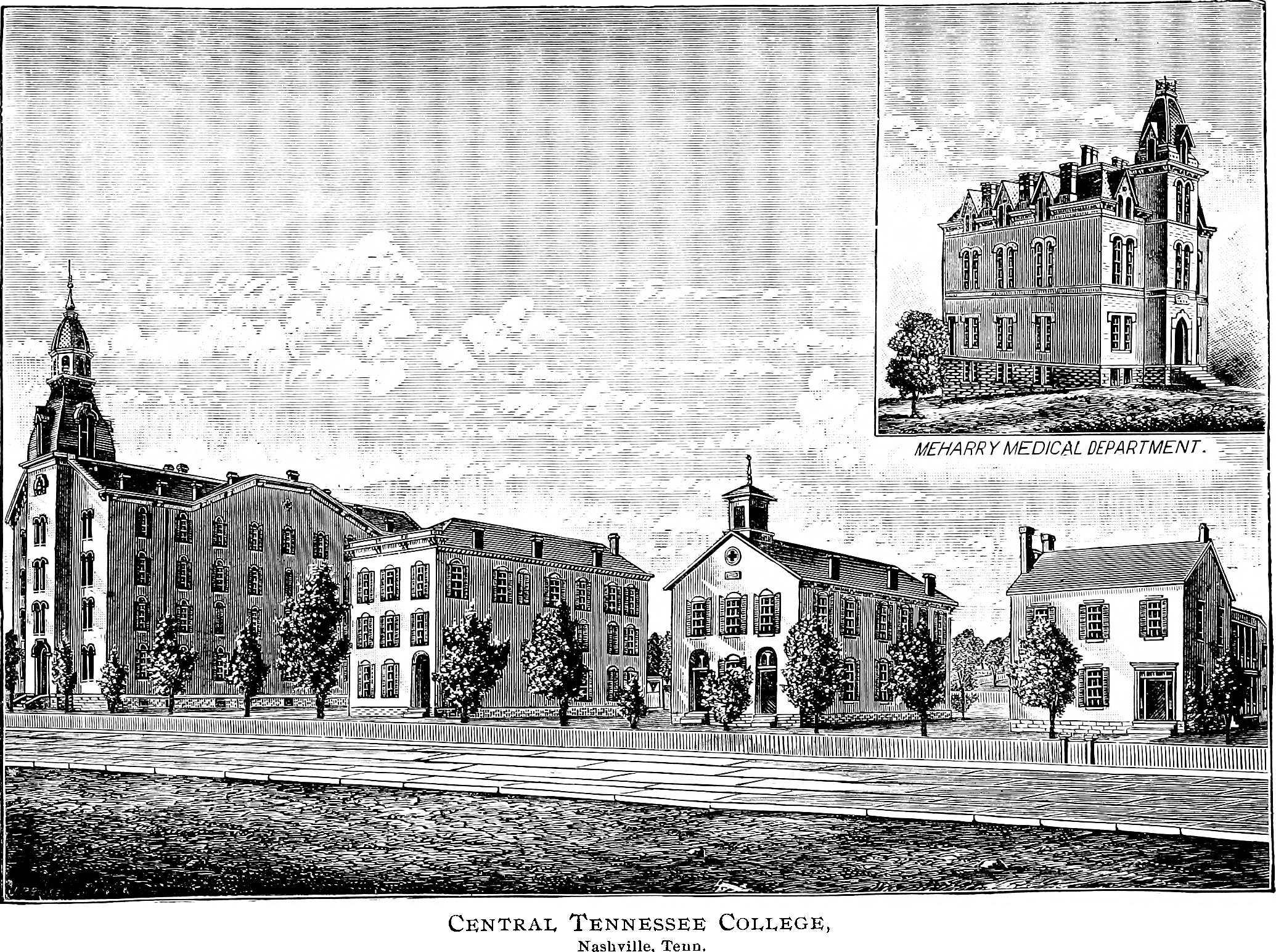
Central Tennessee College and Meharry Medical College

Walden University was founded in Nashville in 1865 by missionaries from the northern Methodist Episcopal Church. They first organized a basic community school for freedmen. Classes attracted both children and adults, as people eagerly embraced the chance for literacy and learning.

After the state established a public elementary school in Nashville, in 1867 the Methodists chartered Central Tennessee College for freedmen. The Freedmen's Bureau helped finance construction of the first two brick buildings. The directors added higher-level courses, including teacher education, agriculture, science, and theology.

The college was part of a first generation of such institutions across the South to educate freedmen and to teach teachers and ministers, fields that were closely aligned as callings. To aid students, it included preparatory classes for those who had not had much prior education. Gaining education was seen as a priority by African Americans, and the vocation of teaching attracted many of the most talented people. States enforcement of racial segregation made separate institutions for blacks necessary.

In 1876, the Medical Department of Central Tennessee College was founded as the first medical school in the South for blacks. It was founded and supported financially by Samuel Meharry and his four brothers, Scots-Irish immigrants who became successful businessmen and philanthropists. In 1915 the medical department received a separate charter and became Meharry Medical College. It still continues in Nashville.

Expansion continued in the 1880s, when the college added departments of law, pharmacy (also the first in the South for African Americans), dentistry and industrial arts.

In the 1890s, the college added courses for women, including nursing in 1892. The college also stressed what were considered industrial and domestic arts, as promoted at Tuskegee Institute. Struggles continued over the appropriate role of the college, a tension reflected in southern education during these years.

In 1900, Central Tennessee College was renamed Walden University in honor of Methodist Bishop John Morgan Walden, who had served freedmen as a missionary after the American Civil War. The university then had thirteen departments and 68 faculty.

After the state established Tennessee Agricultural, Industrial, and Normal State School, now Tennessee State University, in Nashville in 1912, Walden University had more trouble attracting students and struggled to reframe its mission. In addition, in response to lynchings and disfranchisement, many ambitious African Americans left Nashville and other southern areas in the Great Migration to northern cities for work and more freedom. The percentage of black population in the city dropped sharply from 40 percent in 1890. Due to other demographic influences and economic changes, by the 1970s, only 22 percent of the city was black.

In 1922, Walden University was renamed Walden College and was moved to a 12-acre (49,000 m^{2}) campus overlooking the black neighborhood of Trimble Bottom. It served as a junior college, with pre-medical and pre-law programs among its offerings. Continuing financial difficulties forced its closing in 1925.

In 1935 the campus was leased by Trevecca Nazarene University, a private Christian institution affiliated with the Church of the Nazarene, which purchased it in 1937.

== Notable alumni ==
- Mary L. Bell, president and chairperson of Bell Broadcasting Corporation
- Herman Chittison, jazz pianist
- Maude Roberts George (1888-1943), soprano singer, president of National Association of Negro Musicians from 1933 to 1935
- John Henry Hale (1878–1944), prominent surgeon
- Julie Hayden, a 17-year-old teacher murdered by the White Man's League in 1874
- James Franklin Lane (1874–1944), American educator and president of Lane College
- Momulu Massaquoi (1870–1938), Liberian politician and diplomat
- Samuel A. McElwee (1886), lawyer
- Lucian H. Palmer, first African-American member of the Wisconsin Legislature.
- Noah W. Parden (law department, 1891), first African American attorney to present an oral argument before the U.S. Supreme Court.
- Freeman Ransom, lawyer, businessman and civic leader
- Marshall W. Taylor (honorary DD, 1879) Kentucky religious leader
- George L. Vaughn, African-American attorney who successfully argued before the Supreme Court of the United States to eliminate racial covenants

(See Meharry Medical College for a list of many notable medical alumni, including some from the historical period of affiliation with Walden University.)

== Citations ==
- Bobby L. Lovett, "Walden University (1868-1925)" A Profile of African Americans in Tennessee History, Nashville: Tennessee State University
- Smith, John Abernathy. Cross and Flame: Two Centuries of United Methodism in Middle Tennessee. Commission on Archives and History of the Tennessee Conference, United Methodist Church, Parthenon Press, Nashville, Tennessee (1984)..
