= Mary L. Bell =

President and chairperson of Bell Broadcasting Corporation

- Born: 1901; Nashville, Tennessee
- Died: March 25, 1995 (aged 93–94); Detroit, Michigan
- Known for: President and chairperson of Bell Broadcasting Corporation
- Spouse: Haley Bell
- Children: 2

Mary L. Bell (1901–1995) was the first African-American to own and operate a radio station in the city of Detroit, Michigan, as president and chairperson of Bell Broadcasting Corporation.

== Personal life ==
Bell was born in Nashville, Tennessee, and graduated from Walden University (Tennessee). She married Haley Bell, and they had two daughters.

== Career ==
Haley Bell founded Bell Broadcasting Corporation in 1956. Following Haley's death, Mary succeeded him as president and chairperson of the board. She retired in 1992. Bell was the parent company of the Detroit radio stations WJZZ-FM and WCHB-AM, among the first African-American owned and operated radio stations in the U.S.

Bell was active in a variety of organizations, including the National Council of Negro Women, the NAACP, and the YMCA.

== Death ==
Bell died of natural causes on March 25, 1995, in Detroit, Michigan.
