= Dic Jones =

Welsh poet and Archdruid (1934–2009)

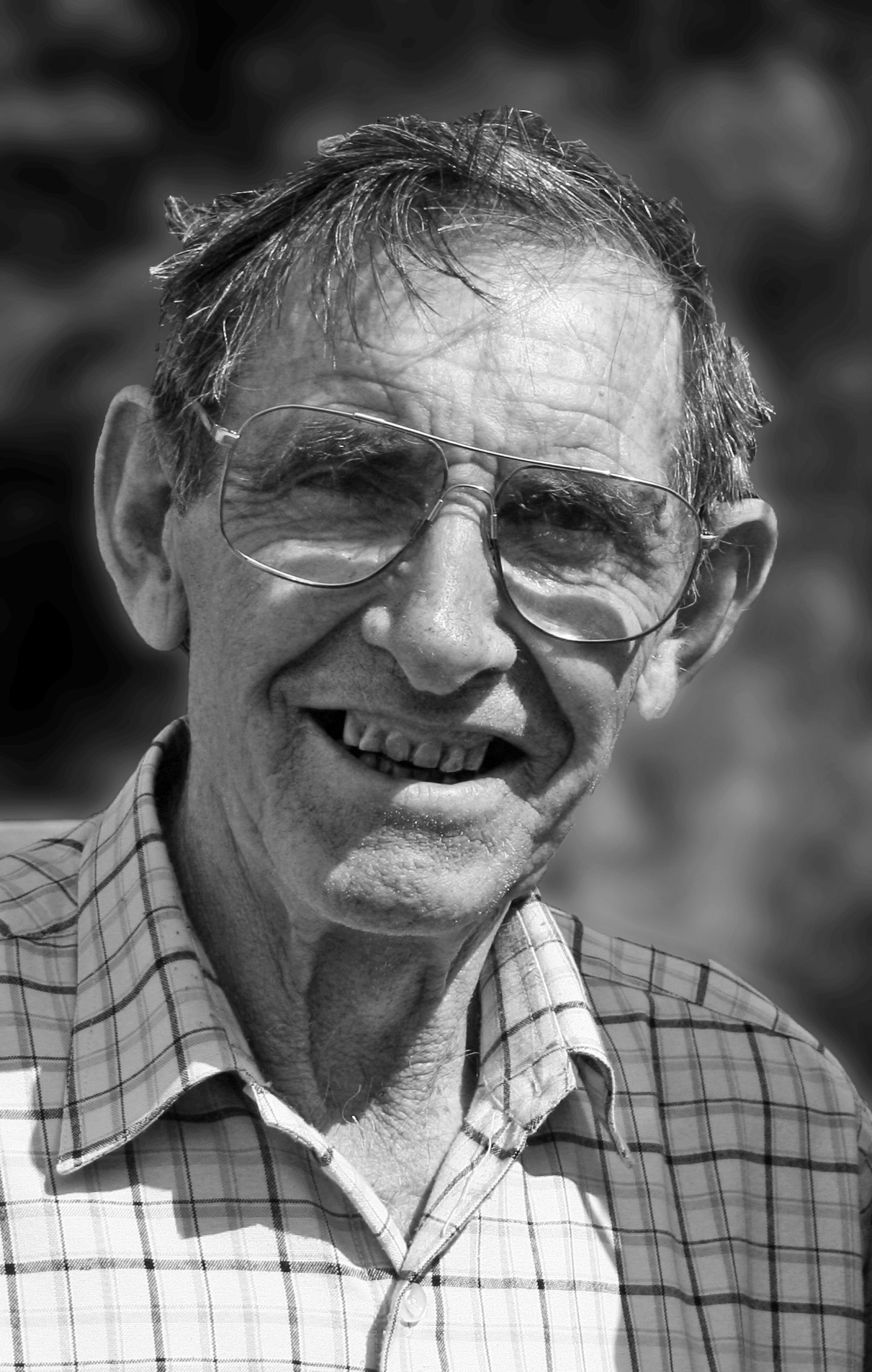
Dic Jones (2009)

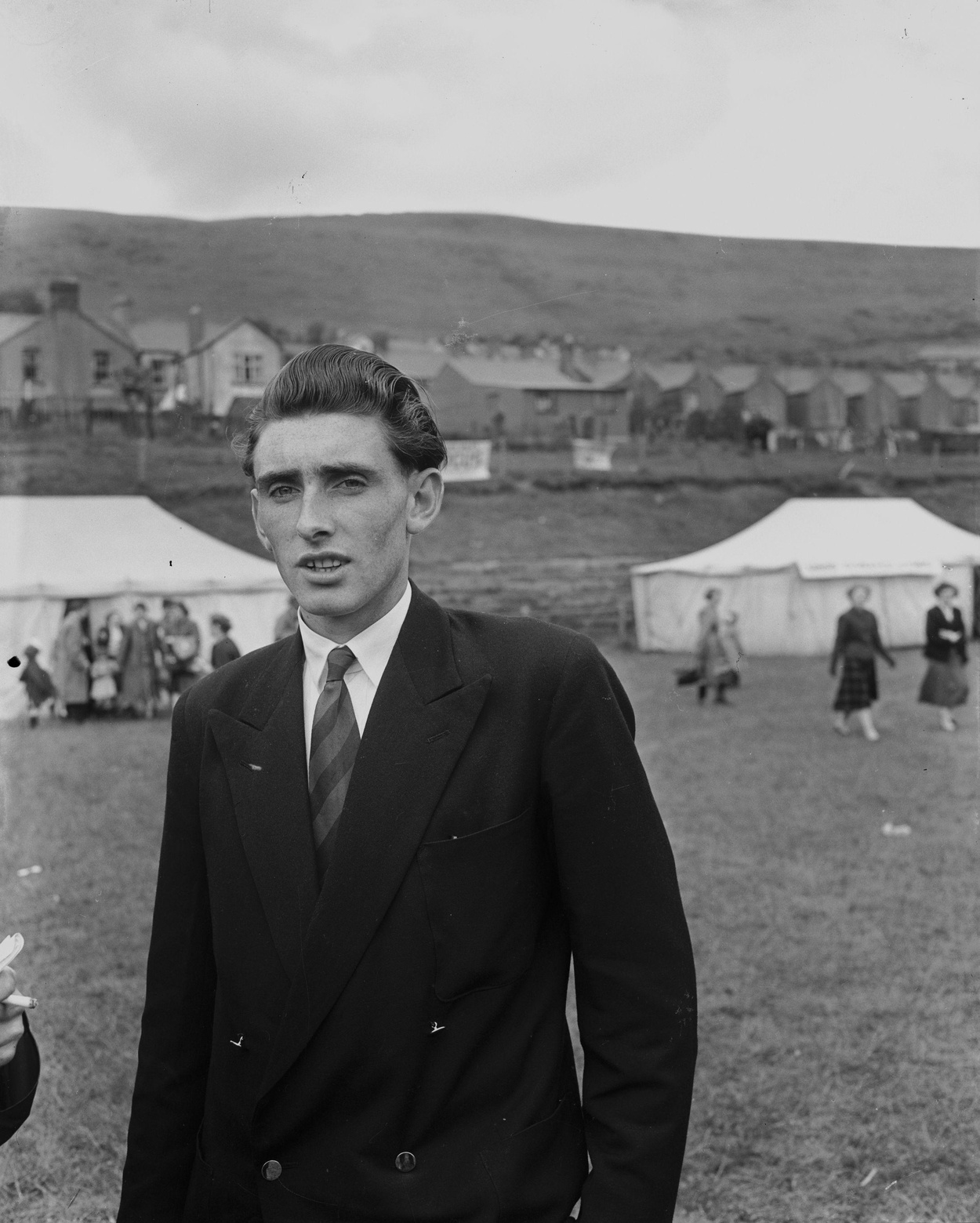
Dic Jones (1955)

Dic Jones (30 March 1934 – 18 August 2009), was a Welsh-language poet and Archdruid of the National Eisteddfod of Wales.

== Career ==
Jones was born Richard Lewis Jones at Tre'r-ddôl in Ceredigion. The son of a farmer, he himself farmed 85 acres (34 ha) at Fferm yr Hendre at Blaenannerch in Aberporth.

Jones began his literary career as a competitor in the Urdd eisteddfod, where, as an exponent of cynghanedd, he won the chair five times in his twenties. In 1966 he won the Chair at the National Eisteddfod with an awdl entitled "Cynhaeaf" (meaning harvest).

In 1968, cameras from HTV filmed one of the first pieces of British reality television, when they followed Jones, his wife Jean, and three of their children, Delyth, Rhian and Dafydd, on a fortnight's holiday to San Antonio, Ibiza.

In 1976 Jones' poetry was chosen again as winner of the National Eisteddfod Chair. However, when his identity was revealed he was disqualified because he was a member of the Eisteddfod's Literature Panel. The Chair was awarded instead to Alan Llwyd.

Under his bardic name "Dic yr Hendre", Jones was installed as Archdruid in 2007, succeeding Selwyn Iolen. He officiated at the 2008 event in Cardiff, but missed the 2009 event in Bala due to ill health.

== Works ==
- Agor Grwn (1960)
- Caneuon Cynhaeaf (1969)
- Storom Awst (1978)
- Sgubo'r Storws (1986)
- Golwg Arall (2001)
- Golwg ar Gân (2002)
- Cadw Golwg (2005)

=== Works about him ===
- Os Hoffech Wybod ... a Chofio Dic (in Welsh) (2010)
- Cofio Dic: Darn o'r Haul Draw yn Rhywle... (in Welsh) (2016)

Preceded by Selwyn Griffith	Archdderwydd of the National Eisteddfod of Wales; 2008–2009	Succeeded by T. James Jones
