= Alexander Wallace Sandford =

Australian politician

Alexander Wallace Sandford (23 April 1849 – 31 December 1905), often written A. Wallace Sandford or Wallace Sandford, was an Australian produce merchant and politician. He was the senior partner in the successful A. W. Sandford & Co. produce business, and was a member of the South Australian Legislative Council from 1897 to 1902. His eldest son, Sir James Wallace Sandford, was a prominent figure in South Australian public life.

== History ==
Sandford was born near Glasgow in Lanarkshire, Scotland, and emigrated to Melbourne, Victoria with his parents around 1864. He joined in the rush to the goldfields, where he worked for several years. He worked for a produce firm 1871 to 1874, then with a number of partners founded his own bacon curing business with a factory in Yarraville and stores in Melbourne, and was soon doing business in the Riverina district in New South Wales, South Australia and Queensland, later specialising in dairy products. In 1880 they opened branches in Mount Gambier and Port Adelaide. They established butter factories and creameries in various country towns, investing heavily in the most modern machinery and large refrigeration plant. The transferred their head office to Adelaide around 1881, leaving his brother John W. Sandford, who was a junior partner, in charge of the Melbourne operation. They developed a thriving export trade. As his health deteriorated his eldest son J. Wallace Sandford took over much of the management duties.

== Politics ==
In 1897 be was elected to the Legislative Council for the Southern District. He was a strong advocate for the interests of rural producers.

== Other interests ==
He was proud of his Scottish heritage, and was prominent in the South Australian Caledonian Society, and its Chief 1895–1897. He was also a Freemason, and one of the founders of Commercial Lodge in 1891. He was for some years Vice-President of the Royal Agricultural and Horticultural Society (his son J. Wallace Sandford was president 1921–1923), and was a member of the Agricultural Bureau. He was associated with the Tynte Street Baptist church.

== Family ==
He married Ada Emilia Waite (ca.1858 – 27 January 1929) in Collingwood, Victoria on 23 March 1878. They had three sons and three daughters:

- Sir (James) Wallace Sandford (20 March 1879 – 9 July 1958) married Kate Irene "Kittie" MacLeod on 10 April 1907
- Olive May Sandford (17 August 1881 – ) was hon. secretary Melbourne District Nursing Society.
- Clarice Jeannie Sandford (7 May 1883 – ) married Dr. Frank Marshall of Sydney
- Major (Lewis) Gordon Sandford MC. (11 February 1885 – ) with Royal Field Artillery World War I, remained in England.
- Percy Warwick Sandford (6 April 1887 – ) married Chryse Maitland Hussey on 1 June 1912
- Dr. Elma Linton Sandford (22 February 1890 – 1983) qualified B.M. in 1917, married Major H. Morgan; both adopted surname Sandford-Morgan. Author of ABC of Mothercraft (1930). Appointed medical officer for MBHA 1937.
