= James Franklin Lane =

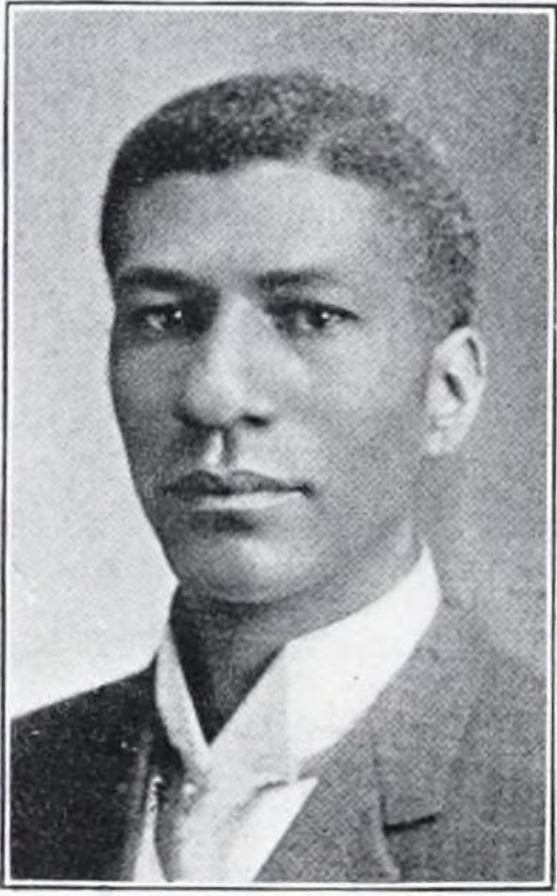
- Lane, c. 1911

3rd President of Lane College
- In office 1907 – December 11, 1944
- Preceded by: James Albert Bray
- Succeeded by: Peter Randolph Shy

Personal details
- Born: February 18, 1874; Jackson, Tennessee, U.S.
- Died: December 11, 1944 (aged 70); Jackson, Tennessee, U.S.
- Resting place: Riverside Cemetery, Jackson, Tennessee, U.S.
- Parent: Isaac Lane (father)
- Education: Lane College, Central Tennessee College

James Franklin Lane (1874–1944) was an American educator and college president. For 37 years, he served as the third president of Lane College, a private historically black college located in Jackson, Tennessee. He was the son of bishop Isaac Lane, the namesake of Lane College.

== Early life and education ==
James Franklin Lane was born February 18, 1874, in Jackson, Tennessee, to parents Francis (née Boyce) and Isaac Lane. His father was the fifth bishop of the Colored Methodist Episcopal Church in America (later known as the Christian Methodist Episcopal Church). He had 10 siblings, his sister Jennie Lane became the first teacher and principal of Lane College.

He attended high school and the normal school coursework at Lane College. Lane continued his studies at Central Tennessee College (later known as Walden University) in Nashville (B.A. degree 1891). Lane did academic work at Harvard College in 1897. He received a M.A. degree from Central Tennessee College in 1903.

== Career ==
In 1896, Lane was the principal at Panola High School in Sardis, Mississippi. He went on to teach mathematics at Lane College, shortly followed by a promotion to department head teacher. Lane was elected president of Lane College in 1907, succeeding James Albert Bray who had left to serve as president of Miles College in Fairfield, Alabama. He remained as president for 37 years. During his administration, the college improved its educational facilities and became one of the few Black schools to be accredited by the Southern Association of Colleges and Schools (SACS).

Lane died at the age of 70 on December 11, 1944, in Jackson, Tennessee.
