= Samuel A. McElwee =

American lawyer (1857-1914)

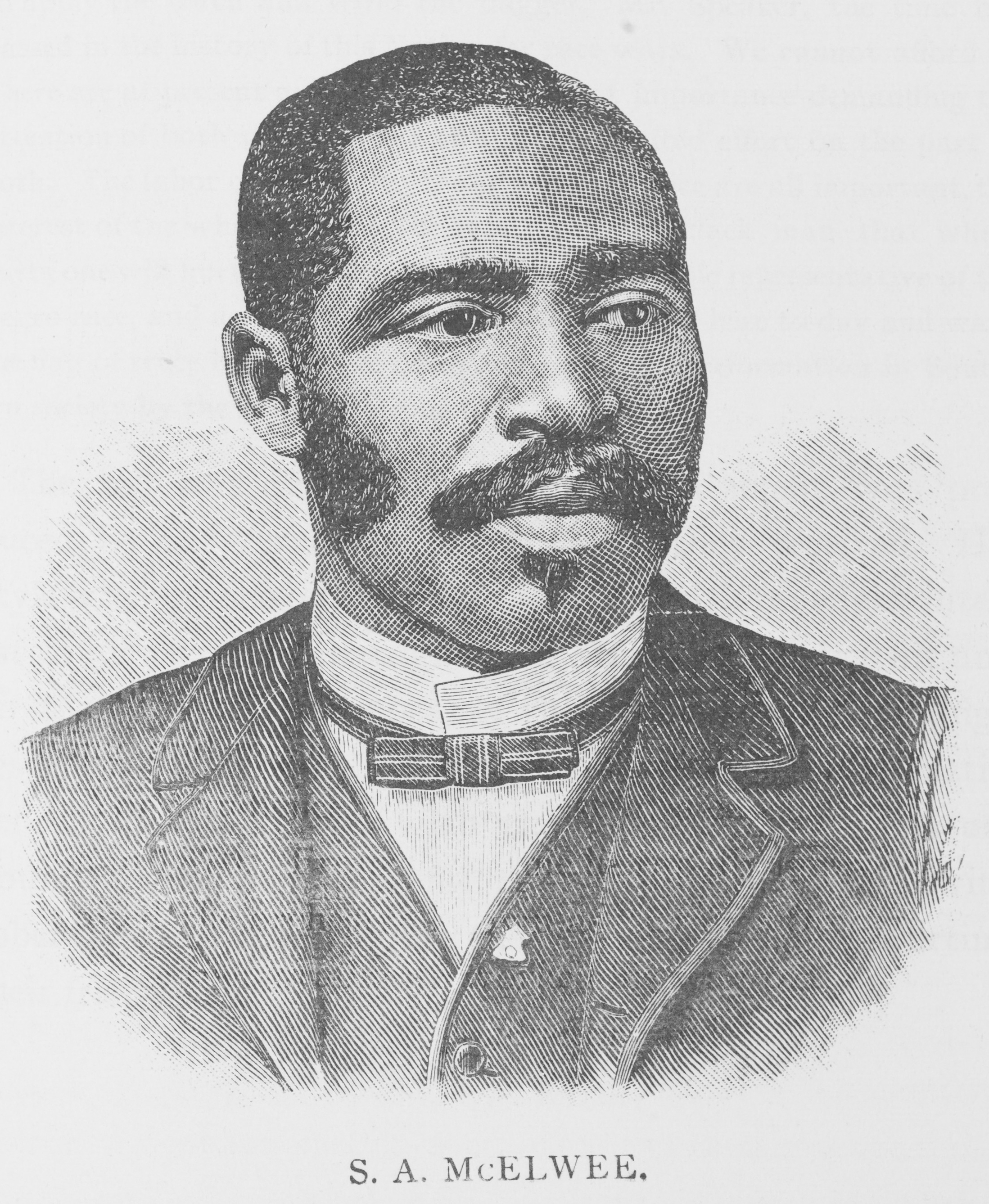
- McElwee in 1887

Tennessee House of Representatives
- In office 1883–1888

Personal details
- Born: 1857 Haywood County, Tennessee, U.S.
- Died: October 21, 1914 (aged 56–57) Chicago, Illinois
- Party: Republican
- Education: Fisk University; Central Tennessee College
- Occupation: Attorney, Politician, Activist

Samuel A. McElwee (1857-1914) was an African-American lawyer and politician in the United States. He was born enslaved in 1857 in Haywood County, Tennessee. His parents were Robert and Georgianna McElwee. He became a lawyer and the most influential Republican Party leader in Haywood County following the Reconstruction era. He served in the Tennessee General Assembly from 1883 to 1888. He was the first African American to serve three terms in legislature and also the first one to be nominated as the Speaker of the House.

== Early life ==
After emancipation, his family moved to a farm in Haywood County in 1866. He attended Freedmen's Bureau Schools. He reported being taught to read as a young child by his former slave master's children, and moved quickly through school. In 1875, he attended Oberlin College in Ohio for a year. Then he returned to the South and taught at a school for three years. He studied Latin, German, and mathematics with a Vanderbilt student whose recommendation got him a Peabody Scholarship to Fisk University. In 1878, he enrolled at Fisk and graduated in 1883.

== Career ==
While still a student at the university, he got elected to the General Assembly from Haywood County. He opened up a grocery store in Haywood County and started reading law on his own. While serving in the legislature he attended the law school of Central Tennessee College in Nashville, and obtained a law degree in 1886.

During his second term in 1885, he was nominated by then former U.S. Senator Roderick R. Butler to be the speaker of the House of Representatives, and received 32 of the 93 votes. He was the head of the Tennessee Republican Convention and was a delegate to the national convention in Chicago in 1884. He was the first African American to be elected three times for a legislative term in Tennessee. He had spoken at the Tuskegee Institute as a commencement speaker in 1887. During the same year, in his third term he proposed a bill that would ensure fairer jury selection. The bill was tabled by a vote of 41–36.

He served during an era when Jim Crowism was in effect. In 1888, he campaigned for a fourth term, but was not elected. This was due to voting fraud and intimidation. McElwee and his family left Haywood County because of violence against African Americans. He established a newspaper and a law firm in Nashville, but he and his family moved to Chicago in July 1901. He started a law practice there and spent the rest of his life there. He died in Chicago on October 21, 1914.

== See also ==
- African Americans in Tennessee
- African American officeholders from the end of the Civil War until before 1900
