= The American French Film Festival =

Film festival in Hollywood, California

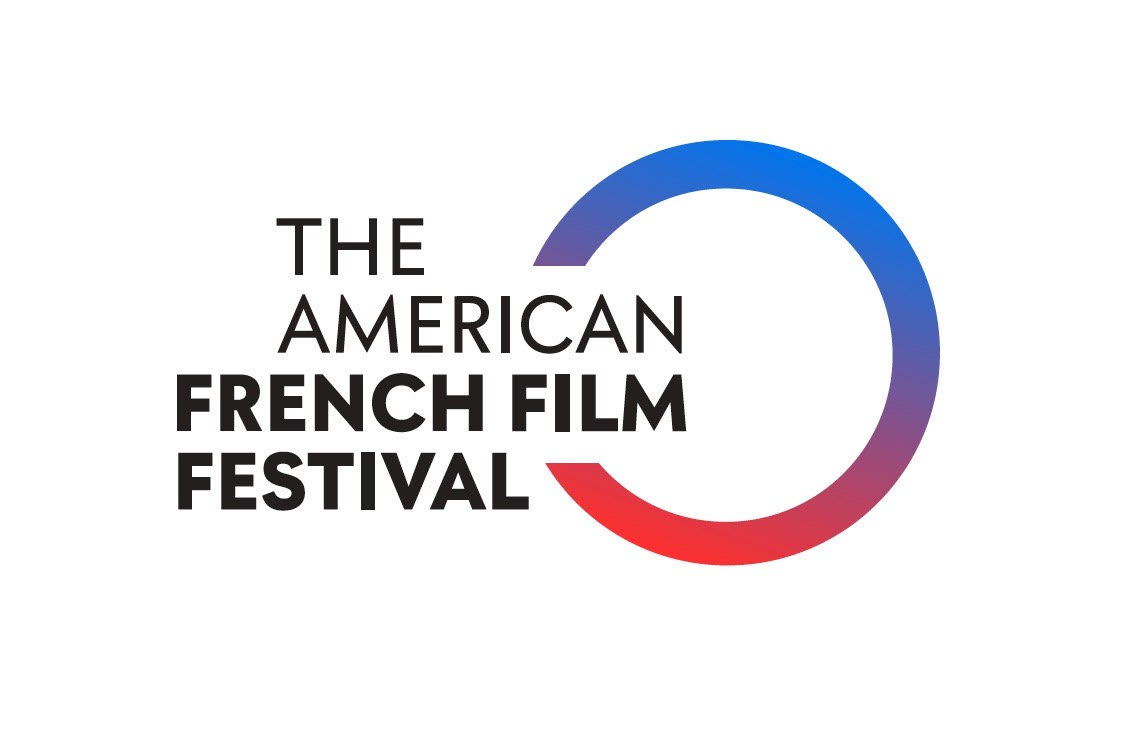
- Location: Los Angeles, California, U.S.
- Founded: 1997
- Hosted by: Franco-American Cultural Fund
- Website: theamericanfrenchfilmfestival.org

The American French Film Festival (TAFFF), formerly City of Lights, City of Angels and the COLCOA French Film Festival, is an annual film festival in Los Angeles, created and presented by the Franco-American Cultural Fund (FACF), in a partnership with the Directors Guild of America (DGA), the Motion Picture Association of America (MPAA), the Writers Guild of America West (WGAW), and France's Société des Auteurs, Compositeurs et Éditeurs de Musique (SACEM). The goals of the festival are to showcase the diversity of French cinema and television series, to promote French films and talent among the film industry and to contribute to cross-cultural understanding. The American French Film Festival is open to professionals and general audience.

== Background ==
The American French Film Festival was created as City of Lights, City of Angels in 1997 by The Franco-American Cultural Fund, a unique collaborative effort of the Directors Guild of America, the Motion Picture Association of America, the Writers Guild of America West, and France's Société des Auteurs, Compositeurs et Éditeurs de Musique (SACEM). It took place at the Directors Guild on Sunset Boulevard and was originally a three-day festival presenting only feature films. The festival is also made possible with the support of L'ARP (France's Association of Authors, Directors and Producers), the Film & TV Department of the French Embassy, TV France International and Unifrance.

In 2004, the selection was changed to be exclusively composed of premieres in Hollywood. In 2015, the festival added French television programs to the lineup. Several high-profile features are presented at the festival for the first time in North America or in the U.S. Some can be International or World premieres. TAFFF is also known for premiering films before their commercial release in the U.S., and for being used by American distributors to launch and promote their film in Hollywood. After 22 years in April, the festival moved to September in 2019 to become the first event of the Awards Season in Hollywood. Following this first edition in Fall, three of the programs premiered at the festival were nominated for the 2020 Academy Awards: "LES MISERABLES"(presented with Amazon Studios)(Best International Film), "I LOST MY BODY" (presented with Netflix)(Best Animated Feature) and "MEMORABLE"(Best Animated short).

The selection includes features, documentaries, animated films, short films and, since 2015, TV movies and TV series. In 23 years, 900 films or TV series have been selected. The festival has constantly developed to become a showcase of 60 films in 2019, with a capacity of 20,000 and an occupancy rate of 91%. Its exclusive program has made the festival an anticipated date in the industry calendar and one of the largest French film festivals in the world.

The festival's audience is mainly composed of film industry professionals, including directors, writers, distributors, producers, agents, exhibitors, critics and journalists. It has developed partnerships with organizations like Independent Film & Television Alliance, the Cannes Film Market, Film Independent, Women in Film, the American Cinematheque, SAG, and since 2008, the Hollywood Foreign Press Association and the Los Angeles Film Critics Association.

In 2008, an educational program was launched to promote foreign films among young American audiences in association with European Languages and Movies in America (ELMA). More than 30,000 students and 160 high schools have participated in the program since 2008. In 2010, a master class program was introduced for colleges, film schools and universities.

For years, the festival has been a leader as a place dedicated to female filmmakers in the selection. In 2019, 40% of the films and series presented were directed by women. The festival has emphasized its commitment to showcasing "the diverse voices of French society" with its lineup's diversity of genres, young directors and "particularly for the creativity coming from new female filmmakers".

The 24th edition was scheduled from September 21–27, 2020. However, on June 30, 2020, the FACF has announced the postponing of the event because of the COVID-19 pandemic in the United States. On May 27, 2021, the FACF confirmed that the festival will celebrate its 25th anniversary as a live event on November 1–7, 2021 at the Directors Guild of America theater complex in Hollywood.

In 2022, the festival was renamed to The American French Film Festival. In 2023, the festival was cancelled due to the 2023 Writers Guild of America strike and 2023 SAG-AFTRA strike. In 2024, the festival launched with several changes, including officially moving its schedule from the spring into a fall to establish its role in Hollywood's annual awards season. That year, nearly half of its lineup consisting of approximately 40 films and TV series were shown in Los Angeles before premiering in France.

== Award winners ==
Since 2005, films selected for the festival compete for its annual awards, formerly known as the COLCOA AWARDS.
