= Harvey C. Russell Jr. =

American businessmen (1918–1998)

Harvey Clarence Russell Jr. (1918 – February 20, 1998) was an American businessman. He was the vice president of PepsiCo, and made history as the first Black officer of a major U.S. multinational corporation. He was also the co-chairman of the Congressional Black Caucus Dinner. PepsiCo established the Global Harvey C. Russell Inclusion Awards in 2003 to recognize exceptional employees who further diversity efforts within the company.

The neighborhood of Russell, Louisville, was named after his father, Harvey Clarence Russell Sr.
