= Russell, Louisville =

Neighborhood in Louisville, Kentucky, United States

Coordinates: 38.2545°N 85.7873°W

Russell Neighborhood historic marker on Ninth Street

Russell is a neighborhood immediately west of downtown Louisville, Kentucky, U.S.. It is nicknamed "Louisville's Harlem". It was named for renowned African American educator and Bloomfield, Kentucky native, Harvey C. Russell Sr.. Its boundaries are West Market Street, 9th Street, West Broadway and I-264.

== History ==
Development began in the 1870s as street car lines were extended to the area. The area was considered one of Louisville's most fashionable in its early years with many affluent white families building elegant mansion homes on Walnut, Chestnut Street, and Jefferson Streets, while working class blacks and whites lived in shotgun houses on adjacent streets. By the 1890s many white families began leaving the area for what would become Old Louisville and the east end, and both middle and working class blacks quickly moved into the area.

By the 1940s Russell had become "Louisville's Harlem" as African American theaters, restaurants, and night clubs lined area streets. However, in the years following World War II many of the middle class blacks left for newly integrated neighborhoods on the south and east ends. Urban renewal efforts in the 1960s had the area's business districts razed and many public housing units built. America's first public library open to African-Americans is in Russell. The Western Branch of the Louisville Free Public Library, on 10th Street off Chestnut, opened in 1908.

Chef Darnell Ferguson is the former owner of Tha Drippin Crab restaurant in Russell.

== Demographics ==
As of 2000, the population of Russell was 9,060.

== See also ==
- Harvey C. Russell Jr.
