= Dennis Henry Anderson =

American minister, educator (1866–1952)

Dennis Henry Anderson (1866 – 1952) was an American Methodist minister, educator, academic administrator, and author in Kentucky. He led efforts to establish schools for African Americans in Kentucky during the era of racial segregation.

== History ==
Dennis Henry Anderson was born in either 1866, or February 14, 1868, in Madison County, Tennessee. He married Artelia Harris of Virginia, on July 14, 1897.

Anderson graduated from Lane College (BA 1893) in Jackson, Tennessee; and from Princeton Normal and Industrial University (DD, MS 1914) in Princeton, Indiana.

He and his wife helped found and build West Kentucky Industrial College (now West Kentucky Community and Technical College) starting in 1909. He worked to get the Kentucky legislature to provide state support for his industrial college. The college struggled for accreditation. As a leader of the college, he tried to frame a political opponent. Management issues were also raised about his leadership.

In 1934, Anderson was awarded an honorary Doctor of Laws degree from his alma mater Lane College.
