= Elma (hamlet), New York =

Human settlement in New York, United States

Coordinates: 42°51′03″N 78°38′25″W

Elma is a hamlet in the town of Elma in Erie County, New York, United States.
