= Motorized recliner incident =

2009 DUI case involving a motorized recliner

In 2009, Dennis LeRoy Anderson of Proctor, Minnesota, received widespread media attention for being arrested in a DUI case involving a motorized recliner. Riding a recliner which he had earlier fitted with a lawnmower engine, he crashed into a car after leaving a local bar, where he had consumed a number of beers. He was convicted and the chair was confiscated by the police, who auctioned it off on Do-Bid.com for $3,700. Though widely reported to be a La-Z-Boy, the chair was unbranded.

== Incident ==
62-year-old Dennis LeRoy Anderson fitted his recliner with a lawnmower engine, wheels and steering wheel, which allowed the chair to reach up to 20 miles (32 km) per hour. He had also installed a stereo, cup holders, headlights and a power antenna. On August 31, 2009, he left a local bar in Proctor, Minnesota, after having drunk eight or nine beers and crashed into a car in the parking lot. When the police picked him up, his blood alcohol content was measured at 0.29. Anderson was sentenced to 180 days in jail and was fined $2,000. The jail time, and half the fine, was made probational.

According to Minnesota law, a "motor vehicle" is taken to mean "every vehicle that is self-propelled and every vehicle that is propelled by electric power obtained from overhead trolley wires". This means that a driver of any motorized vehicle, even a recliner, is liable under DWI legislation. Anderson's blood alcohol content was three times over the legal limit for the state. Vehicles can be confiscated if the driver has a blood alcohol level over 0.2 or a DWI conviction from the last ten years, both of which he did.

== Auction ==
On October 29, Proctor police put the seized chair up for auction on eBay, as a motorized La-Z-Boy. The auction was to run for five days, with an opening bid at $500. By November 2 – one day before bidding was to end – the item had reached $43,700. It was then that the police department was contacted by La-Z-Boy corporation pointing out that the chair was not their product and requesting that the description to be accordingly changed. The police had simply used the description employed by the media. The request was fulfilled but eBay pulled the item from their listings, and the listing had to start anew.

The chair was finally auctioned off successfully for a third time. A Duluth area resident placed the winning $3,700 bid. The chair had been put up for online auction twice before, but those sales fell through.
