= Elmin Marukić =

Serbian footballer

Personal information
- Date of birth: 9 December 1993 (age 32)
- Place of birth: Novi Pazar, FR Yugoslavia
- Height: 1.77 m (5 ft 10 in)
- Position: Midfielder

Youth career
- 2003–2011: Novi Pazar

Senior career*
| Years | Team | Apps | (Gls) |
| 2011–2014 | Novi Pazar | 0 | (0) |
| 2012–2013 | → Morava Ćuprija (loan) | 22 | (5) |
| 2013–2014 | → Vujić Valjevo (loan) | 15 | (3) |
| 2014–2016 | Jošanica | 33 | (7) |
| 2017 | Tutin | 13 | (2) |
| 2017–2020 | Jošanica | 62 | (13) |
| 2020 | Kostampolje | | |
- * Club domestic league appearances and goals

Elmin Marukić (Serbian Cyrillic: Елмин Марукић; born 9 December 1993) is a Serbian footballer.

== Early career ==
Elmin Marukić born in Novi Pazar, began his career in his native Serbia playing for the youth team of FK Novi Pazar. 2012 he made his debut in Srpska liga istok playing against OFK Dubočica
