= West Kentucky Community and Technical College =

Community college in Paducah, Kentucky, U.S.

Coordinates: 37.05518°N 88.65787°W

- Type: Public community college
- Established: 2003
- Parent institution: Kentucky Community and Technical College System
- Academic affiliations: Space-grant
- President: Anton Reece
- Location: Paducah, Kentucky, United States
- Colors: Blue █ and Gold █
- Website: www.westkentucky.kctcs.edu

West Kentucky Community and Technical College (WKCTC) is a public community college in Paducah, Kentucky. It is part of the Kentucky Community and Technical College System (KCTCS) and was formed by the 2003 consolidation of Paducah Community College and West Kentucky Technical College. WKCTC is accredited by the Southern Association of Colleges and Schools, Commission on Colleges (SACSCOC).

== History ==
Paducah Community College was founded in 1932 as a private school called Paducah Junior College (PJC). PJC became a municipal college in 1936. In 1964, PJC moved to a new campus on Alben Barkley Drive in Paducah which serves as today's WKCTC campus. In 1967, PJC joined the University of Kentucky's Community College System, now the Kentucky Community and Technical College System (KCTCS), and became Paducah Community College. (PCC)

West Kentucky Technical College was founded in 1909 as West Kentucky Industrial College (WKIC), a teacher training school for African American students. West Kentucky Industrial College became a state-supported junior college in 1918. In 1937, Harvey C. Russell Sr. became the second president of WKIC. The college changed its name twice more, eventually becoming West Kentucky State Vocational-Technical School. In 1979, the school moved from its home on H.C. Mathis Drive to a new campus adjacent to PCC.

In 1998, PCC and West Kentucky TECH (yet another name for the vocational-technical school) joined the newly formed KCTCS. At that time, West Kentucky TECH became West Kentucky Technical College. That same year, the University of Kentucky opened a branch campus of its College of Engineering at the PCC campus. PCC and West Kentucky Technical College consolidated in 2003 to become West Kentucky Community and Technical College (WKCTC).

In 2020, WKCTC was again named one of the top ten community colleges in the nation by the Aspen Institute and eligible to compete for a $1 million prize. It was the fifth time the college received this recognition.

== Student population ==
Fifty-seven percent of WKCTC's attendees are full-time students, while 43% attend the college on a part-time basis. Almost two-thirds of the student population is female. Dual credit students, composed of high school students earning college credit, compose 20% of the student body. Seventy-eight percent of students receive financial aid.

In the 2022–2023 academic year WKCTC Fall enrollment increased by 9% from the previous year. Over 46% of WKCTC graduates are male. Only 14% of WKCTC graduates are from a minority race.

On average, WKCTC graduates earn a salary of $46,484 three years after graduation. Median salaries three years after graduation are lowest for arts and humanities majors at $33,106 with the highest median salaries for education majors at $57,247.

Full-time enrollment for the 2018–2019 academic year decreased by 2.1 percent from the 2017–2018 academic year. WKCTC enrollment makes up 7% of the Kentucky Community and Technical College System.

== Service area ==
The primary service area for WKCTC includes all eight counties in the Purchase area:

- Ballard County
- Calloway County
- Carlisle County
- Fulton County
- Graves County
- Hickman County
- Marshall County
- McCracken County

It also includes two counties that border on the Purchase area:

- Livingston County
- Lyon County

As a regional institution, the college also serves students from southern Illinois, Missouri and northwest Tennessee.

== Notable alumni ==
- Julian Carroll, first Kentucky Governor from far western Kentucky and Kentucky Senator
- Bob Leeper, Kentucky Senator (1991–2015)
- Jeff McWaters, former member of the Senate of Virginia and founder and former CEO of Amerigroup
- Steven Rudy, Kentucky politician and agribusiness owner
- Roy Skinner, college basketball coach who helped break the racial barrier by recruiting Perry Wallace, the first African American athlete to play varsity basketball for a team in the Southeastern Conference
