= Marshall W. Taylor (minister) =

American writer and religious leader (1846–1887)

Marshal W. Taylor
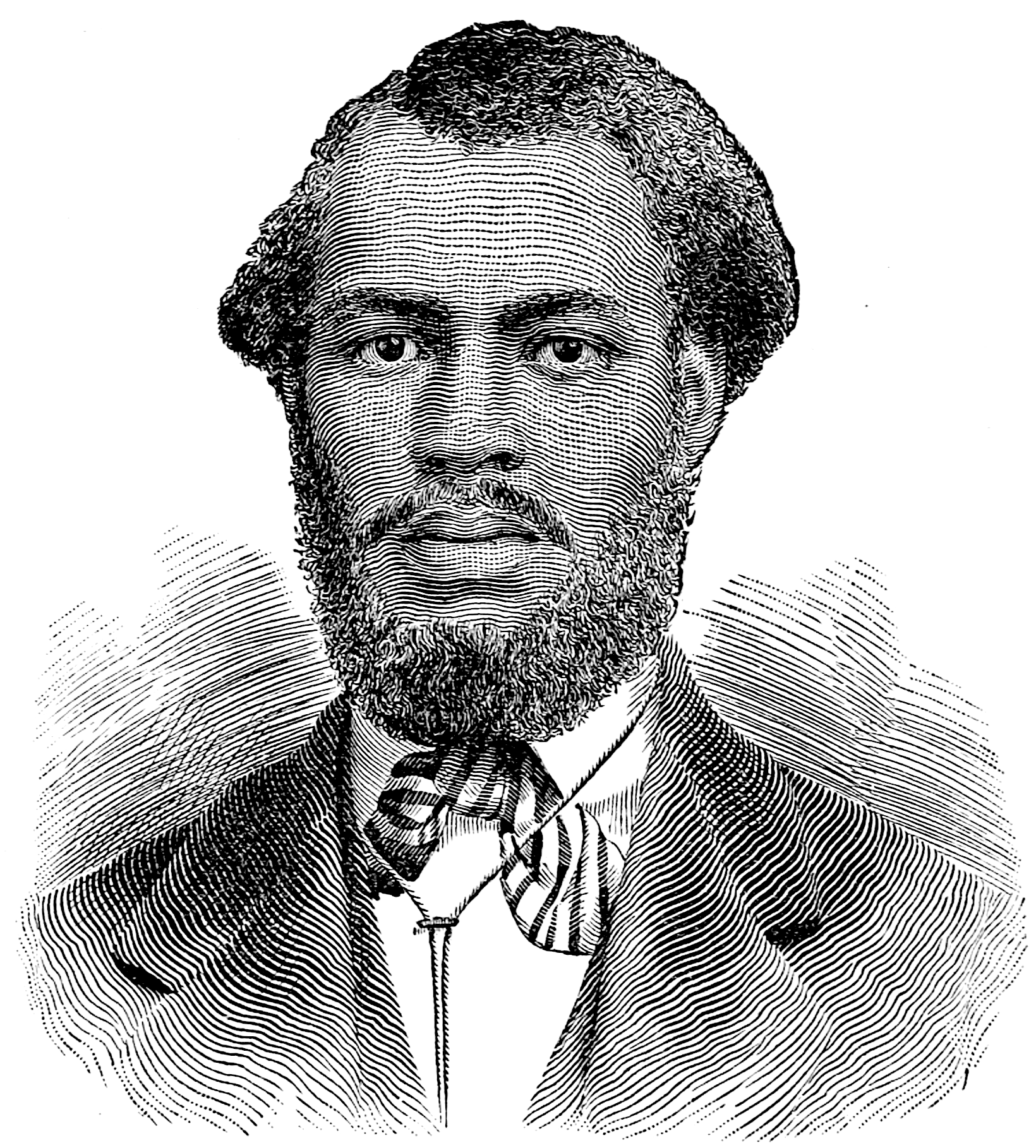
- Sketch of Taylor from 1887 obituary
- Born: July 1, 1846; Lexington, Kentucky, U.S.
- Died: September 11, 1887 (aged 41); Louisville, Kentucky, U.S.
- Resting place: Cave Hill Cemetery; Louisville, Kentucky, U.S.
- Education: Central Tennessee College
- Occupations: Educator; minister; journalist; author
- Spouse: Kate Heston (m. 1869)

Religious life
- Religion: Methodist Episcopal

Marshall W. Taylor (July 1, 1846 – September 11, 1887) was a Methodist Episcopal minister and journalist in Kentucky. He is noted for his book, Collection of Revival Hymns and Plantation Melodies published in 1882. He was also the first black editor of the Southwestern Christian Advocate, a position he held from 1884 until his death in 1887.

== Early life ==
Marshall William Taylor was born on July 1, 1846, in Lexington, Kentucky, the youngest of three children. His parents were born slaves but he was born free. His father was Samuel Boyd and his mother was Nancy Ann Boyd and she was of African and Arabian descent. His mother had some education, and was Marshall's first teacher. He also attended school in Lexington, but after his father died, his mother moved Marshall and his brothers to Louisville, Kentucky in 1854. They were not allowed to attend schools in Louisville, and they moved to Ghent, Kentucky where they stayed for two years and were secretly taught by white children in the neighborhood. They then returned to Louisville before 1861 where Marshall took work as a messenger in the law firm of J. B. Kincaid and John W. Bar and taught schools for black children.

== Career ==
In 1861, Taylor, William W. Hazelton, and Charles B. Morgan formed the United Brothers of Friendship in Louisville. The United Brothers was a fraternal organization similar to the Odd Fellows or the Masons. The group initially sought to help provide impoverished blacks with decent burials. During the American Civil War (1861–1865) the group expanded its mission to caring for the sick. In 1868, they received a charter and organized a state grand lodge.

Taylor also became active in education and Freedmen's schools. Taylor In 1866, Taylor moved to Breckinridge County, Kentucky where he taught schools against the opposition by local whites. In 1868, Taylor was elected president of an educational convention in Owensboro, Kentucky.

=== Religious career ===
Taylor was involved in the Methodist Episcopal church, and that year he also was licensed to preach by Rev. Hanson Tolbert. In 1869, he was working as a teacher in Hardinsburg, Kentucky. The church then sent him to Arkansas as a missionary teacher. He preached in Texas, Indian Territory (now Oklahoma) and Missouri before returning to Kentucky in 1871. In 1872 he was ordained by Bishop Levi Scott in Maysville, Kentucky and took charge of Coke Chapel in Louisville.

In Louisville he created the paper, the Kentucky Methodist. He also held various positions in the local Methodist Episcopal conference including secretary. In 1875, he was made pastor in Indianapolis and in 1876 was made elder. In 1877 and 1878 he was sent to Union Chapel, in Cincinnati, Ohio. In 1879 he was made presiding elder of the Lexington Conference in the Ohio district of the church. In 1880 he was nominated to the position of bishop by a caucus of black delegates to the general Methodist Episcopal conference and in 1881 he was a delegate to the Ecumenical conference at London England. He was elected editor of the Southwestern Christian Advocate in 1884, becoming the papers first black editor. He moved to New Orleans, Louisiana to edit the paper, a position he held until his death. That year he was again nominated bishop, but turned down the position.

During his career he was pastor at Coke Chapel, Louisville, Kentucky; Wesley Chapel, Jeffersonville, Indiana; Coke Chapel, Indianapolis, and Union Methodist Episcopal Church, Cincinnati.

== Other activities ==
He received an honorary degree of Doctor of Divinity from Central Tennessee College in Nashville in 1879. He wrote a number of small books, including a biography of Reverend George W. Downing, Life of Downey, the Negro Evangelist; a music compilation, Collection of Revival Hymns and Plantation Melodies;, a religious text, Universal Reign of Jesus; and a biography of Amanda Smith, Life of Mrs. Amanda Smith, the Missionary.

== Legacy of Collection of Revival Hymns and Plantation Melodies ==
Taylor's Collection of Revival Hymns and Plantation Melodies has been widely studied. In 1928, Newman Ivey White argued that the book was problematic because it did not distinguish black plantation hymns and white revival hymns. Later, George Pullen Jackson, who was an advocate of a later discredited theory that Negro spirituals have white origins, criticized the book for a lack of musicality in 1943, but used some of the scores from Taylor's collection as evidence for his theory. In 1979, Irene V. Jackson attempted to restore the significance of the collection in the eyes of historians with her work, and in 1988 Robin Hough added to collection, "is as interesting for its political and religious agenda as it is for its musical content."

The collection was widely influential at the time; noted revivalists Sol Tibbs and Fanny Tibbs sang from the collection and in 1901, Sol Tibbs republished a versions of Mama, Mama Make Cinda 'Haive Herself', which he took from the book.

== Personal life ==
In 1869, Taylor married Kate Heston, a teacher from Hardinsburg, Kentucky, where he lived at the time.

Taylor died September 11, 1887, in Louisville Kentucky of a tumor on his throat. He had left his home in Indianapolis the day before and died at the home of his brother, George Taylor. His funeral was at Jackson Street, Methodist Church and he was buried at Cave Hill Cemetery in the grave next to that of his mother.

Taylor has a profile in the book, The Afro-American Press and Its Editors (1891). Taylor would become the grandfather of Jazz saxophonist and composer Sam Rivers.

== Noted works ==
- Taylor, Marshall William. A collection of revival hymns and plantation melodies. MW Taylor and WC Echols, 1882.
- Taylor, Marshall William. What I know about a Color Line in the M. E. Church, South Western Christian Advocate, January 25, 1883
