= European Languages and Movies in America =

European Languages and Movies in America (ELMA) is an American non-profit organization dedicated to promoting European cinema and fostering cultural exchange between Europe and the United States. The organization supports cultural and educational programs, including screenings, festivals and educational outreach initiatives.

== History ==
European Languages and Movies in America was founded in 2006 by Pascal Ladreyt and is based in Santa Monica, California. Since its inception, ELMA has supported a wide range of film‑related cultural events in both the U.S. and internationally, with a focus on presenting films in their original European languages. ELMA's mission is to create new avenues for better cultural understanding between the people of Europe and the USA by celebrating alternative cinema.

== Notable partners ==
ELMA partners with cultural organizations and Los Angeles based film festivals. Examples of past notable partners include:

- AFI Fest
- American French Film Festival
- EFP Screenings Los Angeles (European Film Promotion)
- GKIDS
- Goethe-Institut
- Los Angeles Film Critics Association Award Ceremony
- Los Angeles Greek Film Festival
- Outfest
- Screamfest Horror Film Festival
- South-East European Film Festival
- Théâtre Raymond Kabbaz

== High school screenings partnership with the American French Film Festival ==
ELMA is a long-time partner of The American French Film Festival on its High School Screenings program, an educational initiative that introduces high school students to French-language cinema through free festival screenings and related curriculum materials prepared by The American Association of Teachers of French (AATF).

The program, which has run annually for more than one decade, takes place over five days at the Directors Guild of America complex in Los Angeles and includes morning screenings accompanied by discussions with filmmakers and industry professionals. According to Screen Daily, the 18th edition of the program in 2025 brought approximately 3,000 students from 55 schools to screenings of Richard Linklater’s Nouvelle Vague, with Q&A sessions involving the director, cast members, and producers. That year’s program was supported by ELMA and Netflix, which held North American distribution rights to the film.

Screen Daily reported that the initiative is designed to cultivate younger audiences for subtitled and international films, with ELMA founder Pascal Ladreyt describing the program as a way to make filmmaking “approachable and accessible” to students. ELMA director Malin Kan noted that for many participants, the screenings represent their first exposure to subtitled cinema and to French film history.

TAFFF has stated that more than 150 high schools from Southern California have participated in the program since its inception, with cumulative attendance exceeding 40,000 students. The screenings are accompanied by educational materials developed in collaboration with the American Association of Teachers of French.
