= Elmira (given name) =

Elmira, Elmyra is a given name. Notable persons with the name include:

- Elmira Abdrazakova (born 1994), Russian beauty pageant titleholder
- Elmira Alembekova (born 1990), Russian racewalker
- Elmira Antommarchi, Colombian poet
- Elmira Gafarova (1934–1993), Soviet politician
- Elmira Marinova (born 2007), know professionally as El Ma, Italian-Bulgarian singer-songwriter
- Elmira Minita Gordon (1930–2021), Governor-General of Belize
- Elmira Moldasheva, Kazakhstani ski-orienting competitor
- Elmira Nazirova (1928–2014), Azerbaijani composer
- Elmira Ramazanova (1934–2020), Azerbaijani geologist
- Sarah Elmira Royster (1810–1888), sweetheart of Edgar Allan Poe
- Elmira Süleymanova (born 1937), Azerbaijani chemist and civil servant
- Elmira Zherzdeva (born 1936), Soviet singer
- Elmyra Duff, a fictional character from Tiny Toon Adventures
- Elmyra Gainsborough, a video game character from Final Fantasy VII series
