= Elma Mitchell =

Scottish poet (1919–2000)

- Born: 19 November 1919; Airdrie, Lanarkshire, Scotland
- Died: 23 November 2000 (aged 81); Buckland, St Mary, Somerset, England

Elma Mitchell (November 19, 1919 – November 23, 2000) was a Scottish-born poet and translator based in Somerset, who published several well-received books of poetry in the 1970s and 1980s.

== Early life and education ==
Mitchell was born in Airdrie, North Lanarkshire. She attended Prior's Field School in Surrey, and won a scholarship to Somerville College, Oxford, where she gained a first in English in 1941. She went on to achieve a diploma in librarianship at the School of Librarianship, University College London.

== Career ==
Mitchell worked as a librarian and information officer for the BBC during World War II (from 1941 to 1943). She moved to Buckland St Mary, Somerset, and worked as a freelance writer and translator; she also did some amateur archaeological work in South Cadbury. Some of her poems were published in New Statesman in the 1960s. Her "quirkily original" poem "Thoughts After Ruskin" was first published in 1967; it won awards and was included in several anthologies. She published several books of poetry in the 1970s and 1980s.

Many of Mitchell's poems have feminist themes of domestic work, body image, creative frustration, and bereavement. "Mitchell frequently alludes to the strength tapped from the life force of routine necessities and occupations, especially women's traditional occupations," noted Marilyn Hacker in 1997. "This is a woman who is very conscious of being a body with all that implies of delight and restriction," commented poet Herbert Lomas in 1988.

Mitchell died in 2000, at the age of 81, in Buckland St Mary, Somerset. Her poems continue to be included in anthologies, decades after her death.

== Awards ==
- 1977 Cheltenham Festival Poetry Competition
- 1999 Cholmondeley Award

== Works ==
- The Poor Man In The Flesh. Manchester: Harry Chambers/Peterloo Poets. 1976. ISBN 978-0-905291-04-8.
- The Human Cage. Manchester: Harry Chambers/Peterloo Poets. 1979. ISBN 978-0-905291-22-2.
- Furnished Rooms. Manchester: H. Chambers, Peterloo Poets. 1983. ISBN 978-0-905291-47-5.
- People Etcetera: Poems New & Selected. Manchester: Peterloo Poets. 1987. ISBN 978-0-905291-84-0.

=== Anthologies ===
- Maurice Lindsay; Lesley Duncan, eds. (2006). "The Crucifixion Will Not Take Place". The Edinburgh book of twentieth-century Scottish poetry. Edinburgh University Press. p. 241. ISBN 978-0-7486-2015-9. "Elma Mitchell."
- U. A. Fanthorpe; Elma Mitchell; Charles Causley (1996). Penguin Modern Poets. Penguin. ISBN 978-0-14-058754-8.
- Carolyn Kizer (1995). 100 Great Poems by Women. Ecco Press. ISBN 978-0-88001-422-9
- Dorothy McMillan (2010). Modern Scottish Women Poets. Cannongate Books. ISBN 978-1-84767-507-1
