= Elma van Haren =

Dutch poet (born 1954)

- Born: Eleonora Maria van Haren; 29 August 1954 (age 72); Roosendaal, Netherlands
- Occupation: Poet

Elma van Haren (born 29 August 1954) is a Dutch poet.

== Career ==
In 1988, she made her debut as poet with Reis naar het welkom geheten. She won the very first C. Buddingh'-prijs for this collection of poems. She went on to publish various poem collections including De wankel (1989), Het schuinvallend oog (1991) and Grondstewardess (1996). In 1997, she received the Jan Campert Prize for Grondstewardess.

Her poem Het schitterende from her work Eskimoteren was selected as one of the three best poems of the year 2000.

She made her debut in children's poetry with De wiedeweerga (1998). In 2012, she made her debut in prose with the collections of stories Walsen. Van Haren's first novel Mevrouw OVO was published in 2017.

Her work is published by publishing company Uitgeverij De Harmonie.

== Publications ==
- Reis naar het welkom geheten (1988)
- De wankel (1989)
- Het schuinvallend oog (1991)
- Grondstewardess (1996)
- De wiedeweerga (1998)
- Eskimoteren (2000)
- Het Krakkemik (2003)
- Zacht gat in broekzak (2005)
- Flitsleemte (2009)
- Likmevestje (2011)
- Walsen (2012)
- Mevrouw OVO (2017)
- Zuurstofconfetti (2018)
