= Elma Bellini =

American judge (1954–2018)

- Born: November 11, 1954; South Fork, Pennsylvania
- Died: March 4, 2018 (aged 63)
- Occupations: American judge (member of the New York Supreme Court, 2008-2018)
- Spouse: Jim Stevenson
- Parent(s): Philip and Patricia Bellini

Elma Ann Bellini (November 11, 1954 – March 4, 2018) was an American judge who served on the New York Supreme Court.

== Background ==
Bellini was born in South Fork, Pennsylvania on November 11, 1954. She graduated from Monroe Community College, The College at Brockport, State University of New York, and Syracuse University College of Law. Bellini served in the public defenders office.

She was elected as Monroe County, New York judge in 2000, and then served on the New York Supreme Court from 2008 until her death from cancer in 2018. Bellini was a Republican. She lived in Webster, New York, and had been married to her husband, Jim Stevenson, for 20 years at the time of her death.
