= Elma Stuckey =

American poet

Elma Johnson Stuckey (1907–1988) was an African American poet and school teacher. Her poetry concerned the lives of black people from the days of slavery up through the late 1980s.

== Biography ==
Elma Johnson was born in Memphis, Tennessee, on March 15, 1907. She attended Manassas High School in Memphis and obtained her teacher's certificate from Lane College in Jackson, Tennessee. She worked as a teacher and ran a nursery school in rural Tennessee before moving to Chicago in 1945, where she was a supervisor for the Illinois Department of Labor.

The granddaughter of slaves, Stuckey authored two books of poetry late in her life. Her first collection, The Big Gate, was published in 1976, and The Collected Poems of Elma Stuckey was published in 1987. As a poet, Stuckey first gained attention by reading her works on Studs Terkel's WFMT radio program. She also read at Harvard, Cornell and Stanford Universities as well as the University of California at Berkeley.

Stuckey had two children, Delois Jean Stuckey Morrison and historian Sterling Stuckey. She died on September 25, 1988, during a visit to Washington, D.C., where she was scheduled to record readings of her poetry for the Smithsonian Institution.
