= Elma Maua =

Cook Islands journalist

Elma Ngatokoa Maua (12 November 1948 – 28 April 2010) was a Cook Islands-born New Zealand journalist and editor. She was one of New Zealand's first Pasifika journalists.

Maua was born in Rarotonga in the Cook Islands in 1948, the youngest of six children. She moved with her family to Wellington, New Zealand, as a child in 1952.

She worked as a journalist for Radio New Zealand and Niu FM. In 1999, Maua briefly returned to the Cook Islands, where she worked in the Prime Minister's office.

In 2010, her deteriorating health forced Maua to retire as the sports editor of Radio New Zealand International. She died on 28 April 2010 in Wellington, aged 61.
