= Elma Parsamyan =

Soviet Armenian astrophysicist and astronomer

Elma Sureni Parsamian is a Soviet and Armenian astrophysicist and astronomer. She works at the Byurakan Observatory. She serves as the Principal Research Associate of the scientific group.

== Early life ==
She was born in Yerevan, Armenia on December 23, 1929. After moving to Moscow with her father, from 1938 to 1941, Parsamian studied at Moscow School N213. During her school years, she admired the study of astronomy, and decided to become an astronomer. From 1949 to 1954, Elma Parsamian studied at the Astronomy Department of Physical and Mathematical Faculty at Yerevan State University where she graduated with a specialization in Astrophysics.

== Career ==
She joined the staff of the Byurkan Astrophysical Observatory (BAO) and stayed there. In 1961, she earned her Ph.D. degree in Physical-Mathematical Sciences, and became a Doctor of Physical-Mathematical Sciences in 1963.

Elma Parsamian achieved professorship in 1989, and in 2000, she was selected as a corresponding member of the National Academy of Sciences of Armenia. Her main research fields include variable and non-stable stars, galactic nebulae and archaeoastronomical studies.

== Recognition ==
- For Valorous Work (1971)
- Anania Shirakatsi medal (2003)
- Honorary Diploma of NAS RA, ArAS/BAO Prize for Services in Astronomy (2009)
