= Elma Miller =

Canadian musician, composer, writer and educator

Elma Miller (born August 6, 1954) is a Canadian musician, composer, writer and educator.

== Biography ==
=== Education ===
Miller was born in 1954 in Toronto, Ontario. In 1977, she received a BMus and MMus from the University of Toronto. During that time, she studied composition under Walter Buczynski, John Beckwith, Lothar Klein, John Weinzweig and Bogusław Schaeffer. Miller studied piano with Elaine Keillor from 1975 to 1978, and electronic/computer music with Gustav Ciamaga, Bill Buxton, John Chowning and Leland Smith. She also studied aesthetics with Geoffrey Payzant and media with Marshall McLuhan.

=== Compositions ===
In 1979, Miller moved to Hamilton. There, she composes chamber music, music for full orchestra, electronic music and vocal music. From 1976 to 1978, she taught clarinet, theory, counterpoint, orchestration, and 20th century analysis at Toronto University, as well as working as a lecturer and library technician at the university. She was artistic director for the contemporary chamber music series "Music Here & Now". Miller is of Estonian descent, and she has incorporated musical and thematic elements from that heritage into her work. Miller has also found inspiration from astronomy, archaeology, Buddhist meditation and ecology. She has composed works for various musical groups including the Hamilton Philharmonic Orchestra, the Saskatoon Symphony Orchestra and the pianist Elaine Keillor. Her works have been performed in Canada and internationally.

Below is a non-comprehensive list of Miller's compositions.

Title	Date	Instrumentation
Margarita	1979-1980	Chamber Ensemble
Kriss Kringle's wolka paltz	1977	Flute, viola, trombone, and percussion
Things are not what they appear	1981	4 French horns
Le phenix	1980	Trombone and marimba
The dachshund	1975	Voice and piano
Farce	1979	Concrete tape
Pink champagne	1976	Electric tape
Vinderdi vaenderdi	1975	Clarinet and French horn
Chick	1977	3 percussion
Jabberwocky	1980	Baritone, piano

=== Awards ===
In 1980, Miller won the Swedish Els Kaljot-Vaarman prize for chamber music. In 1981, she won the Sir Ernest MacMillan Award (bronze) by the Composers, Authors and Publishers Association of Canada for her orchestral composition Genesis. In 1997, she received honourable mention in the R. Murray Schafer International competition for Music and Play for her composition Butterfly Garden. She also won an Estonian cultural committee in Canada award, as well as an Estonian orchestral award in 1975.
