= Elma Francois =

Trinidad and Tobago trade unionist

- Born: 14 October 1897; Overland, Saint Vincent and the Grenadines
- Died: April 17, 1944 (aged 46)
- Occupations: Human rights campaigner, political activist
- Awards: National Heroine of Trinidad and Tobago

Elma Francois (14 October 1897 – 17 April 1944) was an Africentric Socialist political activist who, on 14 October 1987, was declared as a "national heroine of Trinidad and Tobago". She had been described as one of the "vociferous Africentric activists" in the history of Trinidad and Tobago and in the Caribbean region. She was known for her pro-trade union, anti-war and anti-colonial work.

== Biography ==
=== Early life ===
Born 14 October 1897, Elma Francois acquired her primary education (up to "5th Standard") while working as a cotton picker with her mother, for which the typical pay was just 12–14 cents per day. Even at a young age Francois was an activist for the betterment of her people. She tried to organise the fellow labourers at the Mt. Bentick factory for better working conditions and was fired for doing so.

=== Personal life ===
She bore a son, named Conrad, in 1917. Francois left her son in the care of her mother when she to migrated to Trinidad and Tobago in 1919 in search of better opportunities.

Later, Francois was broken hearted after her son Conrad joined the army to fight in World War II. She opposed the involvement of black people in solidarity with the British Crown because of the racial discrimination against them and her belief that the Allies had allowed Hitler to rise as a counter to Stalin in the Soviet Union.

Francois died in 1944.

=== Trinidad Workingman's Association ===
In Trinidad and Tobago, she worked as a domestic helper. There she joined the Trinidad Workingman's Association, which was led by Captain A. A. Cipriani, a former soldier of the West India Regiment and a sympathizer of the racism and tough conditions faced by the working class of Trinidad. The Workingman's Association was renamed the Trinidad Labour Party in 1934, becoming the country's first political party. Their ambition was to reform the colony's system from within through a series of gradual improvements for workers.

Francois began to clash with Cipriani, who favoured non-confrontational action and often suffered a conflict of interest due to his privileged position as a landowner and a member of the Catholic French Creole class. Francois preferred direct action through the workers rather than the employers. She believed International Workers' Day should be declared a public holiday, to celebrate workers rights.

=== Negro Welfare Cultural and Social Association ===
Francois met Jim Headly as she gave a speech on African Heritage in Woodford Square. Together they were the co-founding members of the so-called Negro Welfare Cultural and Social Association (NWCSA). The association was Marxist oriented and committed to the empowerment of people of African descent, but also had Indian and Chinese members. Francois held the position of Organising Secretary and the NWSCA sought to include both men and women within executive positions.

The NWSCA helped organise hunger marches for sugar workers rights in 1934 and supported Tubal Uriah Butler's 1935 Hunger March. The NWCSA spurred on the national response against the Italian invasion of Ethiopia in 1935, leading to many dockworkers refusing to unload Italian ships. They also helped form the Seamen and Waterfront Workers Trade Union and the Federated Workers Trade Union.

=== Butler party and arrest ===
Francois became involved with the Butler Party, which overtook the Trinidad Workingman's Association (TWA) as the main voice of the islands' workers, which won three of the eighteen seats in the 1946 elections, whereas TWA won none. She participated in the "Butler Riots" of 1937, which began in the oilfields as a protest of working conditions, wages, racism and exploitation. The police attempted to harass and infiltrate the NWSCA party meetings in support of the oil workers.

After being captured by the police, Francois was tried for sedition, becoming the first woman in the history of Trinidad and Tobago to be tried for such. After defending herself, Francois was eventually found not guilty of the crime.

== See also ==
- Women in Trinidad and Tobago
