= Elma Holder =

American elder rights advocate

- Education: Central State College; University of Oklahoma (MSPH)
- Occupation: Elder rights activist
- Awards: Heinz Award (2006)

Elma Holder is an American elder rights activist and co-founder of the National Citizens’ Coalition for Nursing Home Reform, serving as executive director from 1975 through 2002. She is best known for driving multiple reforms to nursing homes into the Omnibus Budget Reconciliation Act of 1987.

== Early life and education ==
Holder graduated with a degree in sociology from Oklahoma's Central State College. She later earned her Master of Science in Public Health from the University of Oklahoma.

== Career ==
Holder's first job was with the Oklahoma State Department of Health as a gerontology consultant. Holder was influenced by surveys of nursing homes and put together a series of recommendations to help improve resident's living conditions. Feeling "disillusioned", Holder moved to Washington, D.C. to work for the National Council on Aging. She worked with both Ralph Nader and Maggie Kuhn, the founder of the Gray Panthers.

In 1975, Holder co-founded the National Citizens' Coalition for Nursing Home Reform (NCCNHR). Holder started as the organization's first executive director and served in this position until 2002. Under her leadership, the organization has been credited with seeking elderly care reform and improvements to the quality of life for those in long-term care. In 1977, she co-authored the book Nursing Homes: A Citizens' Action Guide – How to Organize, Plan and Achieve Nursing Home Reform in Your Community.

Through the actions of NCCNHR, Holder was able to drive multiple reforms into the Omnibus Budget Reconciliation Act of 1987. This included both a "bill of rights" for nursing home residents as well improvements to federal enforcement of nursing home regulations. Holder has campaigned and advocated to reduce the use of physical restraints as a method to control mentally confused residents and elderly patients. In response to Republican efforts to repeal the Nursing Home Reform Act in the early 1990s, Holder stated that it would be "a return to the Dark Ages in nursing homes".

== Awards and honors ==
- In 1997, Holder received the Esther Peterson Advocacy Award from the Consumer Federation of America
- In 1999, Holder received the Gustav O. Lienhard Award for Advancement of Health Care from the Institute of Medicine
- In 2006, Holder was the recipient of the Heinz Awards Chairman's Medal for her lifetime work in service of the elderly

== Works ==
- Nursing Homes: A Citizens' Action Guide – How to Organize, Plan and Achieve Nursing Home Reform in Your Community (1977)
