= Elma Dienda =

Namibian politician and teacher

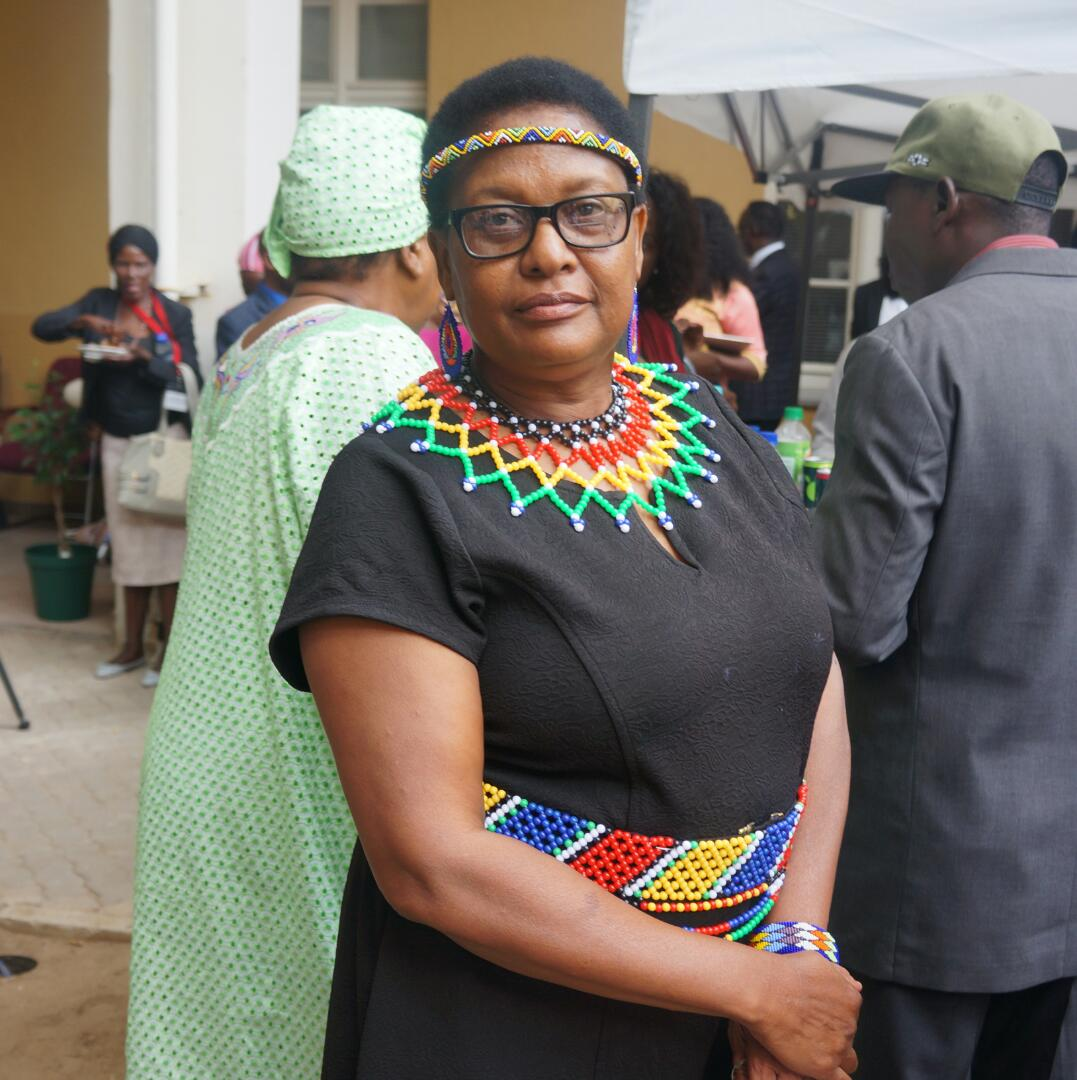
- Dienda at the opening of the Namibian Parliament in 2019.

Member of Parliament of Namibia
- Incumbent
- Assumed office 27 November 2014

Personal details
- Born: South West Africa

Elma Jane Dienda (born 16 November 1964 in Upington, Northern Cape, South Africa) is a Namibian politician and teacher. Currently a member Democratic Turnhalle Alliance which she joined four years after she resigned from the CoD, Dienda was a member of the National Assembly of Namibia from taking the CoD's final spot in 2004 until the CoD did not receive enough votes for her re-election in 2009. She is of South African and Malawian descent.

== Career ==
Dienda is a teacher by profession, having earned an education diploma at the Windhoek College of Education and worked at Eldorado High School in Khomasdal. She also has a paralegal diploma from the Legal Assistance Centre. She received training as a counselor at Catholic AIDS Action. She is currently serving as the Popular Democratic Movement's Chief Whip in parliament.

== Political positions ==
Dienda joined the Congress of Democrats in 1999, the year of its foundation. She also held the position of the secretary of the Women Democrats Party. In 2007, she opposed the election of Ben Ulenga as party president.

Dienda led a drive in the National Assembly which called for the distribution of condoms to prison inmates as a means of preventing the spread of HIV/AIDS. Dienda and other opposition politicians were shouted down, with Utoni Nujoma and Petrus Iilonga vocally opposing the idea. Several SWAPO members denied that sexual activities ever occurred in prisons.
