= Lane College =

Private historically black college in Jackson, Tennessee, US

- The Lane coat of arms consists of two shields, one within the other, and a banner with the College motto directly below them. The colors are cardinal and royal blue.
- Former names: Colored Methodist Episcopal High School (1882–1883); Lane Institute (1883–1896)
- Motto: Esse, Non Videri (Latin)
- Motto in English: "To Be, Not to Seem"
- Type: Private historically black college
- Established: 1882; 144 years ago
- Religious affiliation: Christian Methodist Episcopal Church
- President: Dr. Donald W. Comer (interim)
- Students: 822 (fall 2023)
- Location: Jackson, Tennessee, U.S.
- Campus: Urban, 55 acres (22 ha)
- Colors: Cardinal and royal blue
- Nickname: Dragons
- Sporting affiliations: NCAA Division II, Southern Intercollegiate Athletic Conference
- Website: lanecollege.edu
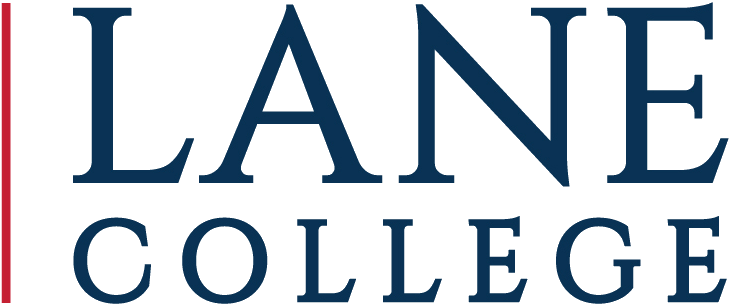
- Lane College Historic District
- U.S. National Register of Historic Places
- U.S. Historic district
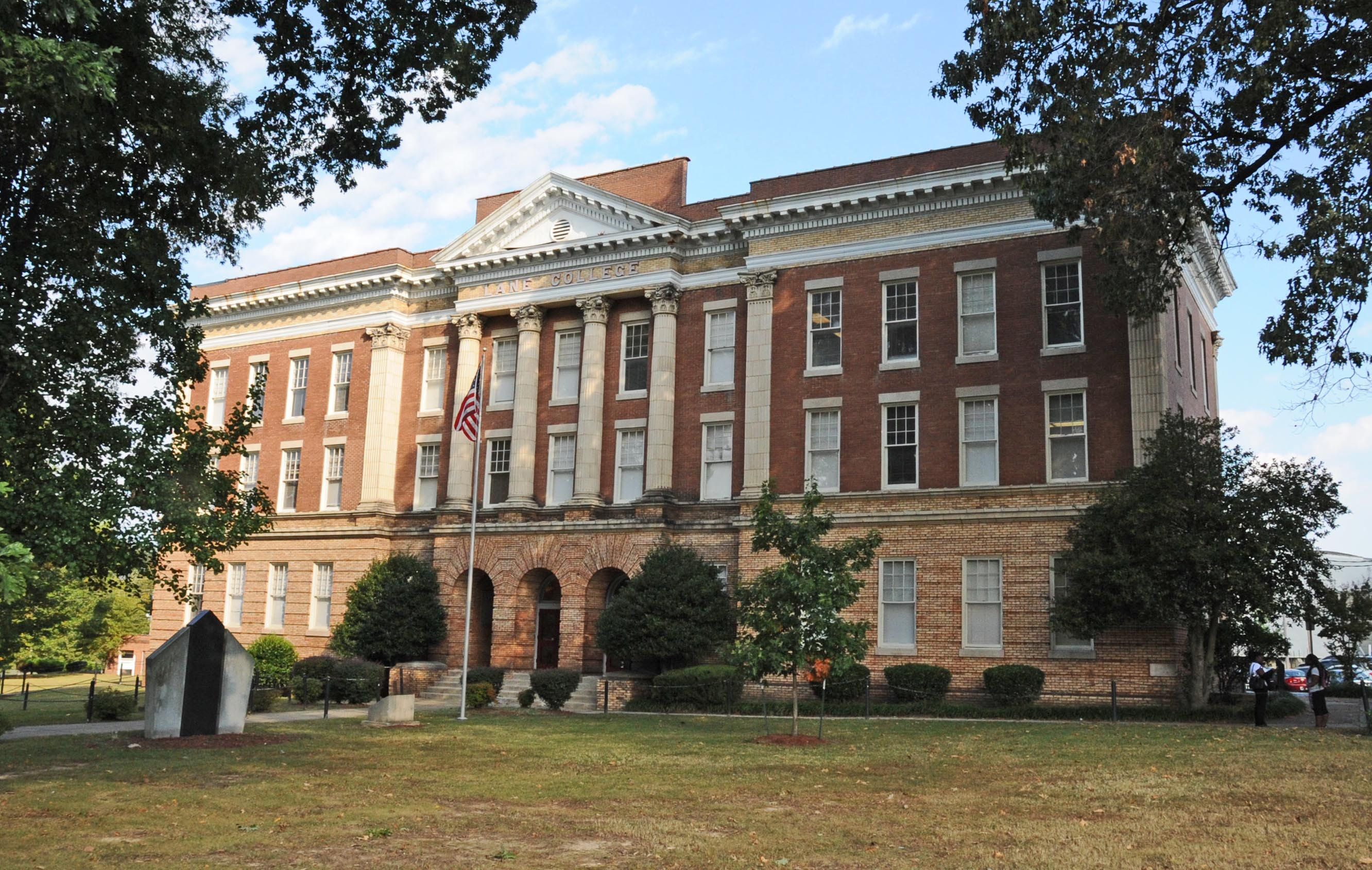

- Location within Tennessee Location within the United States
- Location: Lane Avenue; Jackson, Tennessee, U.S.
- Area: 4.2 acres (1.7 ha)
- Built: 1905
- Architect: Reuben A. Heavner (main hall)
- Architectural style: Classical Revival
- NRHP reference No.: 87001117
- Added to NRHP: July 2, 1987

Lane College is a private historically black college associated with the Christian Methodist Episcopal Church and located in Jackson, Tennessee. It offers associate and baccalaureate degrees in the arts and sciences.

== History ==
Lane College was founded in 1882 by the Colored Methodist Episcopal Church (C.M.E.; now known as Christian Methodist Episcopal Church) as the C.M.E. High School. It was named after Methodist Bishop Isaac Lane, who co-founded the school. Planning for the school had begun in 1878, but the establishment was delayed by a yellow fever epidemic in the region in 1878. Its primary purpose was the education of newly freed enslaved persons, and the original curriculum focused on the preparation of "teachers and preachers." It became Lane Institute in 1883.

In 1887, Rev. T. F. Saunders, a White former enslaver, and a member of the Memphis Conference of the Methodist Episcopal Church, South, was appointed the first president of Lane Institute. In 1896 the college department was formed, and the Board of Trustees voted to change the name to Lane College. Around 1902, many letters were written calling for a Black president for Lane College to the Christian Index, a magazine published by the Christian Methodist Episcopal Church. In 1903, James Albert Bray, a Black graduate of Atlanta University (now Clark Atlanta University) was elected president of Lane College, after T. F. Saunders resignation.

== Presidents ==
- T. F. Saunders, 1887–1903
- James Albert Bray, 1903–1907
- James Franklin Lane, 1907–1944
- Peter Randolph Shy (interim) 1944–1945
- D.S. Yarbrough, 1945–1948
- James H. White, 1948–1950
- Richard H. Sewell (interim) 1950
- Chester Arthur Kirkendoll, 1950–1970
- Herman Stone Jr., 1970–1986
- Alex A. Chambers, 1986–1992
- Arthur L. David (interim) 1992
- Wesley Cornelious McClure, 1992–2013
- Logan C. Hampton, 2014–2024
- Donald W. Comer (interim), 2024–present

== Academics ==
Lane College is accredited by the Commission on Colleges of the Southern Association of Colleges and Schools to award associate's and bachelor's degrees.

== Athletics ==
Wordmark of the Lane Dragons

The Lane College Department of Athletics sponsors men's intercollegiate baseball, basketball, football, cross country, and tennis, along with women's intercollegiate softball, basketball, cross country, volleyball, and tennis. The school's athletic teams are nicknamed the Dragons and compete in Division II of the NCAA. The athletic teams compete in the Southern Intercollegiate Athletic Conference.

Former Lane football player Jacoby Jones became the first player in history to score a receiving touchdown and a return touchdown in a Super Bowl as a member of the Baltimore Ravens.

== Notable alumni ==
Name	Class year	Notability	Reference(s)
Dennis Henry Anderson	1893	Methodist minister, educator, and author	
Walt Bond		Professional baseball player	
Jason Brookins	2001	Former professional football player	
Dave Clark	1934	Pioneering African-American record promoter	
Tequila Harris	2000	Mechanical engineer and professor	
Donald L. Hollowell	1947	Civil rights lawyer and first African-American to be named regional director of a United States government agency (Equal Employment Opportunity Commission)	
Jacoby Jones	2007	Former professional football player and college football coach	
Fred Lane	1997	Former professional football player	
Beebe Steven Lynk	1892	Clubwoman and professor of medical Latin botany and materia medica at the University of West Tennessee	
Fatima Massaquoi	1936	Liberian educator and writer	
Chuck Rainey	1959	Legendary musician with recording credits on thousands of recordings	
Elma Stuckey		Poet and school teacher	
Leroy Tyus		Politician, real estate developer, and state legislator in Missouri	
George L. Vaughn		Lawyer and judge in St. Louis, Missouri; involved in prominent civil rights cases	

== Namesake ==
SS Lane Victory, a World War II Victory ship, one of the few surviving, was named for Lane College. It is now docked in San Pedro, California (which is part of the commercial harbor area of Los Angeles to the south of downtown). It is now open as a museum.
