= Elma Sandford-Morgan =

Australian physician (1890–1983)

- Born: 23 February 1890; Adelaide, Australia
- Died: 1983 (aged 92–93)
- Education: University of Sydney
- Spouse: Harry Morgan
- Children: 1

Elma Sandford-Morgan (23 February 1890 – 1983) was an Australian physician who practised medicine in India and Iraq during the 1920s.

Elma Linton Sandford (later Mrs Sandford-Morgan) was born in Adelaide, South Australia in 1890. Her father, Alexander Wallace Sandford, a businessman and politician, died in 1905. She was educated at a number of girls schools, before entering Cheltenham Ladies College in 1905. Her mother supported her decision to study medicine, and Sandford enrolled at the University of Sydney in 1910. She graduated with her M.D. in 1917.

== Career ==
Sandford was appointed a resident medical officer at the Royal Alexandra Hospital for Children in Sydney, and she then became senior medical registrar at the Royal Prince Alfred Hospital. She travelled to England in 1919 to study ophthalmology at the London hospitals. It was there that she heard about the urgent need for doctors in India to combat eye disease. She worked for a year at the Bhiwani Mission Women's Hospital around 1920, before taking a position in Baghdad at a hospital for women and children. It was in Baghdad, that she met British Army Officer Harry Morgan, and they were married in 1921. She worked in private practice in Baghdad until their daughter, Rosemary was born in 1922.

The Sandford-Morgans returned to Australia in 1923, and Dr Sandford-Morgan worked mainly in private practice, or for the Public Health Service in Hobart and Sydney. Their son, Gavin was born in 1925. Captain Morgan and Dr Sandford-Morgan separated, and she moved to Adelaide with their children around 1937. She was a director and developer of a Mothercraft training school. At a meeting of the Australian Federation of University Women in 1938, comments she made about women graduates and motherhood, made the national newspapers.

== World War II ==
Sandford-Morgan assisted the Royal Australian Air Force Medical Service during World War II. She was appointed to a parliamentary commission investigating health services in South Australia at the close of the war. She wished to take up a position in Europe, and accepted a role as a medical officer at the Commonwealth Immigration camp in New South Wales. However, the transfer that was offered with this role to a European practice, was denied her as a woman. She resigned and sought employment on her own.

== Later life ==
Sandford-Morgan returned to private practice in Australia, and then worked as a neoplasm registrar at the Anticancer Foundation of the University of Adelaide. She continued working until the age of 74 and thereafter volunteered at the Red Cross Blood Transfusion Service until she was 80.

Sandford-Morgan was President of the Medical Women's Society of South Australia.

Elma Sandford-Morgan died in 1983. She is remembered for her pioneering work as a doctor.
