= Elma Mary Williams =

Elma Mary Williams (1913-1971) was a writer from the United Kingdom.

== Biography ==
She was born in Moseley, Birmingham, in 1913 and educated at St John's Convent School.

Having previously written several thrillers and romances, she became nationally well-known during the 1960s and early 70s for her books describing the animal sanctuary she had established on a farm at Tre'r Ddol near Machynlleth in Wales. Valley of Animals (1963) was a best-seller and was followed by several others, such as Animals under my Feet (1965, illustrated by Barry Driscoll), leading to a number of radio and television appearances. Williams, a Roman Catholic who said she had drawn inspiration from St Francis of Assisi, later planned to develop a community where pensioners could retire along with domestic pets who they would otherwise not be allowed to keep. After initial planning setbacks she gained permission to proceed, but died in 1971 before the plans were fully realised. The trust she set up initially planned to open a therapeutic facility on the site, but it was later sold and the last tenant, Winifred Berry, was asked to leave in 1975.

In 1967, the composer Ian Parrott wrote a piece called Pant Glas Idyll inspired by Williams' farm.

== Publications ==
Her books were published as by Elma M Williams:

Fiction

- The Waiting Years (1957)
- House with Loving Walls (1958)
- To Africa – the Bride (1958)
- The Fifth Lake (1959)
- Something of the World (1960)
- Love in a Mist (1960)
- Strange Legacy (1961)
- Escape to Death (1961)
- The Valley (1961)
- Tomorrow a Stranger (1962)
- The Winking Cat (1963)
- Owls Do Cry (1964)
- The Shaft of Light (1965)
- Where is Sylvia? (1967)
- Paul’s Secret Courage (1967)

Pant Glas

- Valley of Animals (1963)
- Pig in Paradise (1964)
- Animals Under My Feet (1965)
- Elma M Williams Introduces The Valley of Animals, Pant Glas, Tre’r Ddol, Machynlleth (1969, booklet)
- Heaven on my Doorstep (1970) Foreword by Sir George Thomas.
- The Pant Glas Story (1970)
- Ride a Cock Horse (1970)
