= Wilhelmina (given name) =

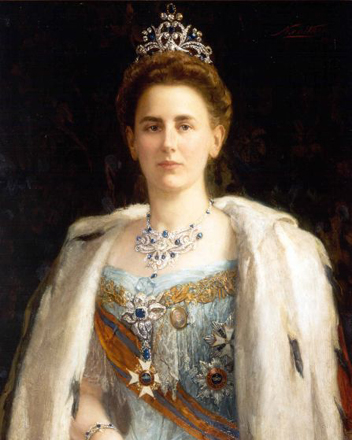
- Queen Wilhelmina was a Dutch princess and queen of the Netherlands.
- Gender: female

Origin
- Origin: Germanic
- Meaning: "will helmet" or "willing to protect"

Other names
- Related names: Wilhelm, Wilma, Elma, Helmi, Minna, Velma, Vilma, Willa

Wilhelmina (also: Wilhelmena, Wilhelmine, Wilhemina) is a feminine given name. It is the Dutch, German and Yiddish feminine form of Wilhelm (German), Willem (Dutch), or William (English). It is derived from the Germanic wil, meaning "will, desire" and helm, meaning "helmet, protection". Wilhelmina was ranked in the top 1000 most popular names for girls in the United States between 1900 and 1940, but is rarely used today. Nicknames for Wilhelmina include, but are not restricted to, Minna, Mina, Mineke, Minnie, Willie, Willy, Willa, and Billie.

== Notable people with this name ==
- Wilhelmina Hay Abbott (1884–1957), Scottish suffragist and feminist
- Wilhelmina Bonde (1817–1899), Swedish countess and courtier
- Wilhelmina Cooper (1939–1980), Dutch-American high fashion model and founder of Wilhelmina Models
- Minna Craucher (born Maria Vilhelmiina Lindell; 1891–1932), Finnish socialite and spy
- Wilhelmina Marguerita Crosson (1900–1991), American educator and school administrator
- Wilhelmina Delco (née Fitzgerald; born 1929), American politician
- Wilhelmine Kekelaokalaninui Widemann Dowsett (1861–1929), Native Hawaiian suffragist
- Wilhelmina Drucker (1847–1925), Dutch politician and writer
- Vilhelmina Gyldenstolpe (1779–1858), Swedish court official
- Wilhelmina Harper (1884–1973), American children's librarian and children's author.
- Wilhelmina Harris (1896–1991), American historian and writer
- Wilhelmina Iwanowska (1905–1999), Polish astronomer
- Wilhelmina Jallah, Liberian physician and politician
- Wilhelmina Feemster Jashemski (1910–2007), American classical archaeologist
- Wilhelmine Mimi Johnson (1890–1980), Norwegian geologist, physician
- Wilhelmena Rhodes Kelly (1946–2019), African-American genealogist
- Wilhelmina Koskull (1778–1852), Swedish courtier
- Mary Wilhelmina Lancaster (1924–2019), American Catholic nun and foundress of the Benedictines of Mary, Queen of Apostles
- Wilhelmine Lohmann (1872–?), German teacher, social worker, and temperance leader
- Vilhelmína Lever (1802–1879), Icelandic shopkeeper and restaurateur
- Wilhelmina (Willy) Anna Lub (1900–1986), Dutch physicist who worked with Marie Curie in her Paris laboratory, researching the spectrum of actinium
- Nnaniki Wilhemina Tebogo Makwinja, Botswanan politician
- Wilhelmina Reuben-Cooke (1946–2019), American attorney
- Wilhelmina Rietveld (1949–1973), Dutch-Canadian model
- Wilhelmina Rolark (1916–2006), American politician
- Wilhelmina Seegmiller (1866–1913), Canadian-born American author, illustrator, and art teacher
- Wilhelmina Skogh (1849–1926), hotel and restaurant owner from Sweden
- Wilhelmina Tokcumboh "Mina" Smallman (born 1956), British retired Anglican priest and former school teacher
- Wilhelmina “Minnie” Vautrin (1886–1941), American missionary, diarist, educator and college president
- Wilhelmina “Mena” Webb (1915–2012), American writer and editor
- Wilhelmine Williams (1878–1944), American feminist, pacifist, professor, and Latin American historian

=== Artists, performers, and art patrons ===
- Wilhelmina Alexander (1756–1843), Scottish muse
- Wilhelmina Alexander (1871–1961), Canadian oil painter and philanthropist
- Augusta Wilhelmena Fredericka Appel (1905–1973), American silent and early sound film actress
- Wilhelmina Barns-Graham (1912–2004), British abstract artist
- Wilhelmina Dranga Campbell (1871–1911), American art educator and magazine editor
- Wilhelmine Clauss-Szarvady (1832–1907), Bohemian-born French pianist
- Wilhelmina Drupsteen (1880–1966), Dutch illustrator
- Wilhelmina Enbom (1804–1880), Swedish operatic soprano
- Wilhelmina Gravallius (1809–1884), Swedish writer
- Joyce Penelope Wilhelmina Frankenberg (born 1951), British-American actress
- Wilhelmina Frankfurt, American ballerina
- Wilhelmina Fundin (1819–1911), Swedish operatic soprano
- Wilhelmina Geddes (1887–1955), Irish stained glass artist
- Wilhelmina Gelhaar (1837–1923), Swedish operatic soprano
- Wilhelmina McAlpin Godfrey (1914–1994), American painter, printmaker and textile artist, art educator and community activist
- Wilhelmine Gulowsen (1848–1899), Norwegian writer
- Wilhelmina von Hallwyl (1844–1930), Swedish collector and donor whose accumulation of art and other objects constitute the current Hallwyl Museum in Stockholm.
- Wilhelmina Douglas Hawley (1860–1950), American-Dutch painter
- Wilhelmina Holladay (1922–2021), American art collector and patron
- Wilhelmine Holmboe-Schenström (1842–1938), Norwegian opera singer
- Wilhelmina van der Horst-van der Lugt Melsert (1871–1928), Dutch actress
- Wilhelmina Houdini (1876–1943), American stage assistant and wife of Harry Houdini
- Wilhelmina van Idsinga (1788–1819), Dutch painter
- Wilhelmina Josephson (1816–1906), Swedish pianist
- Wilhelmina Krafft (1778–1828), Swedish painter and miniaturist
- Amalia Wilhelmina Königsmarck (1663–1740), Swedish painter and poet
- Wilhelmina Lagerholm (1826–1927), Swedish painter and an early professional female photographer
- Katherine Elizabeth Wilhelmina Sharon Beuving Langbroek (born 1965), Australian comedian, radio and television presenter
- Wilhelmina Pruit (1865–1947), American poet
- Wilhelmina Sablairolles (1818–1891), Dutch actress
- Wilhelmina Angela Schmidt (1897–1998), Dutch author, playwright and cabaret singer
- Wilhelmina Seegmiller (1866–1913), Canadian-born American author, illustrator, art teacher
- Wilhelmine Schröder (1839–1924), Swedish writer
- Wilhelmine Schröder-Devrient (1804–1860), German operatic soprano
- Wilhelmina van Sluyters (1852–1926), Dutch actress
- Wilhelmena Fuller Webb (1915–2012), American writer
- Wilhelmina Wendt (1896–1988), Swedish silversmith
- Wilhelmina "Wimie" Wilhelm (1961–2023), Dutch actress and film director
- Wilhelmine von Wrochem (1798–1839), German flutist, singer and actress

=== Royalty and nobility ===
- Wilhelmina of the Netherlands (1880–1962), Queen of the Netherlands from 1890 until her abdication in 1948
- Princess Wilhelmine of Denmark (disambiguation), several Danish princesses
- Wilhelmina Amalia of Brunswick (1673–1742), empress consort of the Holy Roman Empire of the German Nation, Queen of the Germans
- Wilhelmine of Bayreuth (1709–1758), German princess (the older sister of Frederick the Great) and composer
- Wilhelmine of Prussia, Margravine of Brandenburg-Bayreuth (1709–1758), German princess
- Wilhelmina of Prussia (1750–1820), German princess
- Princess Wilhelmina of Schwarzburg-Rudolstadt, (1751–1780), Princess of Nassau-Saarbrücken
- Princess Caroline Wilhelmina Sophia of Hesse-Kassel (1732–1759), German princess
- Wilhelmina Louisa of Hesse-Darmstadt (1755–1776), German princess and first wife of Paul I of Russia
- Wilhelmine of Prussia (1774–1837), German princess and later queen of the Netherlands
- Wilhelmine of Baden (1788–1836), German Grand Duchess of Hess and the Rhine
- Mary Adelaide Wilhelmina Elizabeth of Cambridge (1833–1897), Member of the British royal family
- Beatrix Wilhelmina Armgard (born 1938), Queen of the Netherlands from 1980 until her abdication in 2013
- Wilhelmina Powlett, Duchess of Cleveland (1819–1901), English historian and maid of honour to Queen Victoria
- Countess Beatrice Wilhelmine von Hardenberg (1947–2020), German noblewoman and former wife of Francisco de Borbón y Escasany, 5th Duke of Seville
- Mariae Gloria Ferdinanda Joachima Josephine Wilhelmine Huberta, Princess of Thurn and Taxis (born 1960), German aristocrat

=== Sportspeople ===
- Wilhelmina van den Berg (born 1947), Dutch sprinter
- Wilhelmina von Bremen (1909–1976), German American gold medalist in the Olympics
- Vilhelmina Bardauskienė (born 1958), Lithuanian long jumper
- Wilhelmina “Minie” Brinkhoff (born 1952), Dutch retired cyclist
- Wilhelmina "Mijntje" Donners (born 1974), Dutch field hockey striker
- Wilhelmina Lust (born 1932), retired Dutch track-and-field athlete and Olympian
- Willemina Hendrika "Ineke" Tigelaar (born 1945), Dutch former freestyle swimmer and Olympian
- Wilhelmina “Willy” den Turk (1908–1937), Dutch swimmer
- Wilhelmina “Mina” Wylie (1891–1984), Australian swimmer and Olympian

=== Fictional characters ===
- Wilhelmina Carmel from the Shakugan no Shana light novels
- Wilhelmina Grubbly-Plank from the Harry Potter book series
- Wilhelmina "Willie Jack" Jacqueline from the Reservation Dogs series
- Mina Harker (born Wilhelmina Murray) from Dracula
- Wilhelmina Robinson, a character in Enid Blyton's Malory Towers
- Wilhelmina "Willie" Scott from Indiana Jones and the Temple of Doom
- Wilhelmina Slater from Ugly Betty
- Wilhelmine, an evil witch and major antagonist in The Mighty Hercules animated series from the 1960s
- Princess Wilhelmina or "Willie" from Bruce Coville's The Dragonslayers
- Wilhelmina "Will" Vandom of the Italian comic/cartoon series W.I.T.C.H.
- Wilhelmina "Billie" Logan, the daughter of Ted Logan, from Bill and Ted Face the Music
- Wilhemina Venable, from American Horror Story: Apocalypse and American Horror Story: 13

== Variants ==
- Billie (English)
- Elma (Dutch, German)
- Guilla (Spanish)
- Guillaumette (French)
- Guillaumine (French)
- Guillerma (Spanish)
- Guillermina (Spanish)
- Guilhermina (Portuguese)
- Guglielma (Italian)
- Guglielmina (Italian)
- Guilette (French)
- Helma (German)
- Helmi (Finnish, Swedish)
- Helmine (German)
- Ilma (Spanish)
- Jeltje (Dutch, Frisian)
- Jeltsje (Dutch, Frisian)
- Mien (Dutch)
- Mientje (Dutch)
- Miina (Finnish)
- Mimi (French)
- Mimmi (Finnish)
- Mina (English, German, Polish)
- Mine (German)
- Minchen (German)
- Minette (French)
- Mini (Finnish, Spanish)
- Minka (Czech, Polish, Slovak)
- Minna (Finnish, German)
- Minnie (English)
- Velvela (Yiddish)
- Vilhelmiina (Finnish)
- Vilhelmina (Finnish, Swedish, Hungarian)
- Vilma (Czech, German, Portuguese, Slovak, Spanish, Swedish, Finnish)
- Wilhelmiina (Finnish)
- Wilhelmine (French, German)
- Wilja (Scandinavian)
- Willa (English)
- Willamina (Scots)
- Willemijn (Dutch)
- Willemina (Dutch)
- Willene (English)
- Willie (English)
- Willy (English)
- Wilma (English, German)

== See also ==
- Wilhelmina (disambiguation)
