= Guilherme =

- Pronunciation: [ɡiˈʎɛɾmɨ] or [ɡiˈʎɛʁmi]
- Gender: Male

Origin
- Region of origin: Portugal

Guilherme is a Portuguese given name, equivalent to William in English. The feminine form of this name is Guilhermina. Diminutive forms include Guilhermino. Vilma (Portuguese form of Wilma) is another female variant of the name.

== Guilherme ==
=== Brazilian footballers ===
- Guilherme Alecsander Machado Guedes (born 1991), who last played for Marist
- Guilherme Alvim Marinato (born 1985), who currently plays for Lokomotiv Moscow
- Guilherme Augusto Vieira dos Santos (born 1995), forward
- Guilherme Borges (born 1999), midfielder
- Guilherme Camacho (born March 1990), who currently plays for Corinthians
- Guilherme de Cássio Alves (born 1974), retired striker
- Guilherme Castilho (born 1999), Brazilian footballer
- Guilherme Costa Marques (born 1991), who currently plays for Legia Warsaw
- Guilherme Finkler (born 1985), who currently plays for Wellington Phoenix FC
- Guilherme Haubert Sityá (born April 1990), left back
- Guilherme Lopes de Almeida (born 2002), left back
- Guilherme Mendes Ribeiro (born 2000), forward
- Guilherme Milhomem Gusmão (born 1988), who currently plays for Atlético Mineiro
- Guilherme Oliveira Santos (born 1988), who currently plays for Valladolid
- Guilherme de Paula Lucrécio (born 1986), who currently plays for Milsami Orhei
- Guilherme do Prado (born 1981), who last played for Chicago Fire
- Guilherme Schettine Guimarães (born 1995), who currently plays for Santa Clara
- Guilherme Siqueira (born 1986), retired Brazilian left back
- Guilherme Soares Guedes de Freitas (born 1999), who currently plays for Grêmio
- Guilherme Teixeira (born 1992) Brazilian footballer
- Guilherme Vinícius Quichini dos Santos (born 1993), who currently plays for Famalicão

=== Other ===
- Guilherme Arantes, Brazilian musician
- Guilherme Batista Silva, Brazilian para swimmer
- Guilherme Berenguer, Brazilian TV actor
- Guilherme Colombo (born 1986), Brazilian politician
- Guilherme Cortez (born 1997), Brazilian lawyer and politician
- Guilherme Da Luz (born 1979), Brazilian basketball player
- Guilherme de Brito
- Guilherme Kilter (born 2001), Brazilian politician
- Guilherme Peixoto, Portuguese priest and DJ, also known as Padre Guilherme
- Guilherme Piai (born 1990), Brazilian politician
- Guilherme Posser da Costa, prime minister of São Tomé and Príncipe
- Guilherme Samaia, Brazilian racing driver
- Guilherme Weber

== Guilhermina ==
- Guilhermina Marçal, East Timorese humanitarian activist
- Guilhermina Prata (born 1952), Angolan lawyer, politician and diplomat
- Guilhermina Suggia (1885–1950), Portuguese cellist
- Terezinha Guilhermina (born 1978), Brazilian paralympic athlete
