= Herminia (given name) =

Herminia is a feminine given name. Notable people with the name include:

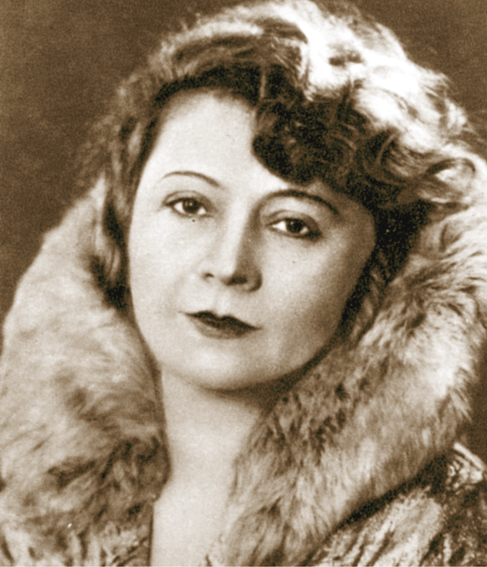
Herminia Naglerowa

- Herminia Albarrán Romero, Mexican-American artist
- Herminia Álvarez Herrera (1888–1955), Mexican Revolutionary War veteran, propagandis, personal tutor, governess
- Herminia Arrate (1895–1941), Chilean painter and First Lady of Chile
- Herminia Borchard Dassel (1821–1857), German-American painter
- Herminia Bouza (born 1965), Cuban javelin thrower
- Herminia Brumana (1897–1954), Argentine teacher, writer, journalist
- Hermínia da Cruz Fortes, better known as Hermínia d'Antónia de Sal, (1941–2010), Cape Verdean singer
- Herminia D. Dierking (1939–2008), Guamanian educator, a cabinet member of the Government of Guam
- Herminia Ibarra, professor at London Business School
- Herminia Naglerowa (1890–1957), Polish writer and publicist
- Herminia Palacio, U.S. nonprofit executive; CEO of the Guttmacher Institute
- Herminia Rodríguez Fernández (died 1944), Cuban politician
- Herminia Roman (born 1940), Filipino politician
- María Herminia Sabbia y Oribe (1883–1961), Uruguayan poet
- Hermínia Silva (1907–1993), Portuguese fado singer
- Maria Hermínia Tavares de Almeida, Brazilian political scientist, sociologist, professor
- Herminia Tormes García (1891–1964), Puerto Rican lawyer

== See also ==
- Hermina (given name)
