= Mine (name) =

Mine is a Turkish female given name that means enamel and may refer to:

- Mine Ercan (born 1978), Turkish women's wheelchair basketball player
- Mine Teber, Turkish film and TV actress.
- Mine Tugay, Turkish theatre, TV series and cinema actor.
- Mine Türker (born 2006), Turkish boccia player

== See also ==
- Mina (given name)
- Mena (given name)
- Minna (given name)
- Mine
