= Hilma =

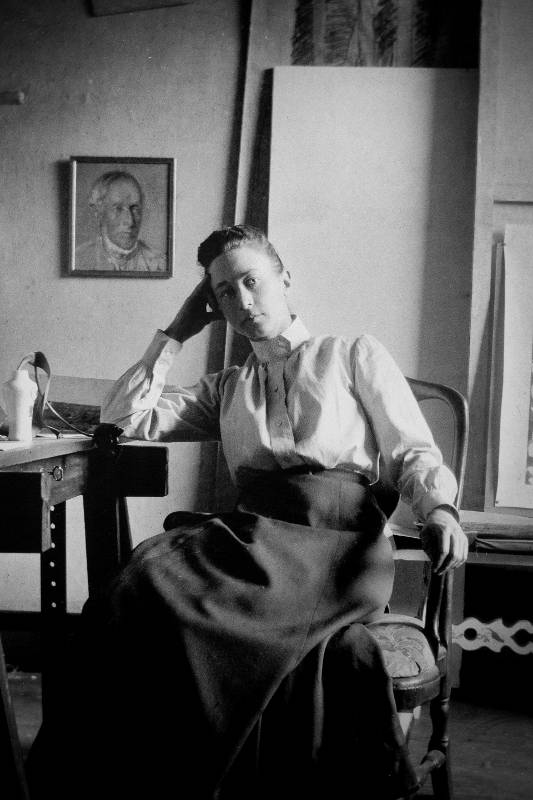
- Photograph of the Swedish painter Hilma af Klint (1862–1944) at her art studio.
- Gender: Female

Other names
- Variant forms: Wilhelmina, Hilmar, Hilmer

Hilma is a female given name that was in occasional use at the turn of the 20th century. The name was made popular by the German poet Friedrich Gottlieb Klopstock. The name was used in early 19th century Scandinavian literature, probably as a variant of Wilhelmina. It can also be a variant of the male name Hilmar or Hilmer.

== People ==
- Hilma Angered Strandberg (1855–1927), Swedish writer
- Hilma Caldeira (born 1972), Brazilian volleyball player
- Hilma Contreras (1913–2006), Dominican writer
- Hilma Granqvist (1890–1972), Finnish anthropologist
- Hilma Iita, Namibian politician
- Hilma Gabriella Jahnsson (1882–1975), Finnish lawyer
- Hilma af Klint (1862–1944), Swedish artist and mystic
- Hilma Räsänen (1877–1955), Finnish educator and politician
- Hilma Swedahl (1870–1965), Swedish gold prospector
- Hilma Valjakka (1881–1934), Finnish politician
- Hilma Wolitzer (born 1930), American novelist

== See also ==
- Helma
- Helmi (disambiguation)
- Wilhelmina (disambiguation)
