= Velma =

Velma may refer to:

== Places ==
- Velma, Illinois
- Velma, Nebraska
- Velma, Oklahoma
- Velma, Virginia

== Other uses ==
- Velma (given name), including persons and fictional characters
- Velma (TV series), a 2023 streaming series

== See also ==
- Thelma (disambiguation)
- Wilma (given name)
