= Guillermina =

Guillermina is a female given name with Spanish origins and may refer to:

- Guillermina Bravo (1920–2013), Mexican ballet dancer, choreographer and ballet director
- Guillermina Bravo Montaño (born 1949), Colombian politician
- Guillermina Candelario (born 1970), Dominican weightlifter
- Guillermina Casique Vences (born 1961), Mexican politician
- Guillermina Dulché, Mexican painter
- Guillermina Grant (born 2002), Uruguayan tennis player
- Guillermina Green (1922–2006), also known as Guillermina Grin, Spanish film actress
- Guillermina Jasso, American sociologist
- Guillermina Jiménez Chabolla (1930–2020), known by her stage name Flor Silvestre, Mexican singer, actress, and equestrian
- Guillermina López Balbuena (born 1973), Mexican politician
- Guillermina Lozano, American geneticist
- Guillermina Rojas y Orgis, Spanish anarchist and teacher
- Guillermina Uribe Bone (1920–2018), Guatemalan civil engineer
- María Guillermina Valdes Villalva (also known as Guillermina Valdez de Villalva, 1939–1991), Chicana scholar and activist
