= Minah (disambiguation) =

Minah is a South Korean idol singer, a member of the band Girl's Day.

Minah may also refer to:

- USS Minah, various ships by that name
- Min-ah, a Korean given name also spelled Mina
- Francis Minah (1929–1989), Sierra Leonean politician
- Jacob Minah (born 1982), German decathlete
- Minah Bird (1950–1995), Nigerian model and actress

== See also ==
- Mina (disambiguation)
- Minna (disambiguation)
- Mynah, a bird of the starling family
