= Velda (disambiguation) =

Velda is a name given to the hypothetical ancestress of the Cantabrian people and Haplogroup V (mtDNA).

Velda may also refer to:

- The secretary and love interest of the crime fiction character Mike Hammer
- Velda González (1933-2016), Puerto Rican actress and politician
- Velda Johnston (1912-1997), American novelist
- Velda Jones-Potter (born 1957 or 1958), American businesswoman and politician
- Velda Otsus (1913-2006), Estonian actress and dancer
- Veldá (Bad Bunny song)
- Kay Velda (born 1990), Dutch footballer

== See also ==
- Vella (surname)
- Velma (disambiguation)
