= Department Assembly of Valle del Cauca =

Department Assembly of Valle del Cauca Asamblea Departamental del Valle del Cauca

Type
- Type: unicameral
- Seats: 21

The Department Assembly of Valle del Cauca (Spanish: Asamblea Departamental del Valle del Cauca) is the department assembly of the Colombian Valle del Cauca Department. The assembly is part of the Colombian legislative branch of government at a provincial level and its main function is to debate, approve or change the local ordinances. It is composed of 21 elected deputies.

== History ==
The history of the Department Assembly of Valle del Cauca has its roots in the creation of the Valle del Cauca Department.

=== Hostage crisis ===
As part of the Colombian armed conflict on April 12, 2002, members of the Revolutionary Armed Forces of Colombia (FARC) stormed the Department Assembly of Valle del Cauca and kidnapped 12 Deputies of the Valle del Cauca Department to pressure a prisoner exchange between them and the government and to negotiate the demilitarization of the municipalities of Florida and Pradera to initiate peace dialogues.

== Functions ==
The Department Assembly of Valle del Cauca sessions regularly in ordinary sessions during six months in three periods of two months and can be prolonged for up to ten days. Extraordinary sessions can be called up by the Governor of Valle del Cauca to analyze certain projects specifically. The deputies are in charge of analyzing for approval or disapproval of ordinances after three discussion debates that once approved are then sanctioned and signed by the governor of Valle del Cauca.

== Organization ==
The Department Assembly of Valle del Cauca is headed by the Mesa Directiva (literally "Directorate Table"), which is integrated by the president of the Department Assembly of Valle del Cauca, first vice president, second vice president and general secretary.

=== Members ===
Since the 2015 regional elections, the members of the Department Assembly of Valle del Cauca for the 2016–2019 term are:

Office	Party	Officer	Ref
President of the Department Assembly	Colombian Conservative Party	José Snehider Rivas Ayala	
First vice president	Social Party of National Unity	Manuel Laureano Torres Moreno	
Second Vice President	MIRA political party	Ramiro Rivera Villa	
General Secretary		Sebastian Jare Quiñonez Castillo	

Party	Deputy
Social Party of National Unity (U)	Juan Carlos Garces Rojas; Guillermo Montalvo Orozco; Martha Lucía Velez Mejia; Manuel Laureano Torres Moreno; Juan Carlos Rengifo Arboleda
Democratic Center (CD)	Julio Cesar Gaviria Varela; Juana Eloisa Cataño Muñoz
Colombian Conservative Party (C)	Jose Snehider Rivas Ayala; Amanda Ramirez Giraldo; John Jairo Caicedo Villegas; Carlos Alberto Orozco Franco
Colombian Liberal Party (L)	Myriam Cristina Juri Montes; Géssica Vallejo Valencia; Hugo Armando Bohórquez Chavarro; Luzdey Martínez Martínez; Diana Patricia Moreno Cetina
Radical Change (CR)	Mariluz Zuluaga Santa; Antonio Ospina Carballo
Green Alliance (AV)	Maria Isabel Moreno Salazar
MIRA political party (MIRA)	Ramiro Rivera Villa
Alternative Democratic Pole (POLO)	Rolando Caicedo Arroyo

==== 2008-2011 term ====
Name	Party
Camilo Escobar Osorio (Note: Succeeded Cristian Garcés, who resigned his seat.)	Colombian Conservative Party (C)
Alvaro López Gil	Colombian Conservative Party (C)
Mario Germán Fernández De Soto Sánchez	Colombian Conservative Party (C)
Emilio Merino González	Colombian Conservative Party (C)
Amanda Ramírez Giraldo	Colombian Conservative Party (C)
Rubiel Antonio Muñoz Corrales	Citizens' Convergence (Note: Renamed as National Integration Party (Colombia))
Jaime Aguilar Domínguez	Citizens' Convergence
Juan Eccehomo Calimán Pabón	Citizens' Convergence
Yiminson Figueroa Carabalí (Note: Succeeded Blanca Oliva Cardona)	Citizens' Convergence
Andrés Felipe Solarte (Note: Succeeded José Ritter López Peña, who resigned his seat to run for Mayor of Palmira in 2011)	Social Party of National Unity (U)
Edgar Libardo Mejía Gallego	Social Party of National Unity (U)
Mauricio Martínez Prado	Social Party of National Unity (U)
Antonio Ospina Carballo	Radical Change (CR)
Gustavo Adolfo González Blandón (Note: Succeeded Fernando Vargas Restrepo)	Radical Change (CR)
José Fabio Rojas Giraldo	Radical Change (CR)
Marino Del Río Uribe	Colombian Liberal Party (L)
Norberto Tascón Ospina (Note: Succeeded Juan Carlos Salazar)	Colombian Liberal Party (L)
Myriam Cristina Juri Montes	Colombian Liberal Party (L)
Fernando Forero Cruz	Alternative Democratic Pole (POLO)
Ana Milena Ortiz Sánchez	Alternative Democratic Pole (POLO)
Álvaro Elías Martínez (Note: Succeeded Guillermina Bravo Montaño, who resigned her seat to run for Governor of Valle del Cauca in 2011)	MIRA political party (MIRA)

== See also ==
- Governor of Valle del Cauca Department
- List of Colombian Department Assemblies
- Legislative Branch of Colombia
