= Velma (given name) =

- Gender: Female
- Language: English

Origin
- Meaning: Created name based on Selma and Thelma

Velma is an English feminine given name of uncertain origin. It might have been created as a rhyming variant of the names Selma and Thelma. It might also have been influenced by the Scandinavian name Vilma or by Wilma, both short forms of the Dutch and German Wilhelmina and feminine versions of William.

== Usage ==
The name has been most common in North America. It was among the 1,000 most popular names for girls in the United States between 1880 and 1973 and was at the height of its popularity between 1903 and 1917, when it was among the 100 most popular names for American girls. It reached peak popularity in 1912, when it was the 88th most popular name for newborn American girls. It was at peak popularity in Canada between 1920 and 1933, when it was among the top 100 names for Canadian girls. It is famously used as Scooby-Doo character's name, Velma Dinkley.

== Women ==
- Velma Abbott (1929–1987), Canadian baseball player
- Velma Barfield (1932–1984), American murderer
- Velma Wayne Dawson (1912–2007), American puppet maker
- Velma Demerson (1920–2019), Canadian woman imprisoned for having a baby out of wedlock with a Chinese man
- Velma Dunn (1918–2007), American diver
- Velma Gaines-Hamock (1910–2000), American funeral home owner
- Velma Hopkins (1909–1996), American labor rights activist
- Velma Swanston Howard (1868–1937), Swedish-American translator
- Velma Huskey (née Roeth; 1917–1991), American pioneer in early computing and author of several important papers on the history of computing.
- Velma Bronn Johnston (1912–1977), American animal rights activist
- Velma Linford (1907–2002), American educator, author, and politician
- Velma Caldwell Melville (1852–1924), American writer and poet
- Velma Middleton (1917–1961), American jazz vocalist
- Velma McBride Murry, American psychologist and sociologist
- Velma Owusu-Bempah (née Crossland; born 1981), Ghanaian milliner
- Velma Pollard (1937–2025), Jamaican poet and fiction writer
- Velma S. Salabiye (1948–1996), American Navajo librarian and promoter of Native American librarianship
- Velma Šarić (born 1979), Bosnian journalist and founder and president of the Post-Conflict Research Center
- Velma Scantlebury (born 1955), Barbadian-born American transplant surgeon
- Velma Wallace Rayness (1896–1977), American artist, author, and instructor
- Velma Williams Smith (1927–2014), American country musician and guitarist
- Velma Springstead (1906–1926), Canadian athlete for whom the Velma Springstead Trophy is named
- Velma Veloria (born 1950), Filipino-American politician
- Velma Wallis (born 1960), American novelist

== Fictional characters ==
- Velma Dinkley, a character in Scooby-Doo franchise
  - Velma (TV series), a 2023 streaming series featuring that character
- Velma Kelly, fictional character in the musical and the 2002 film adaptation of Chicago
- Velma Von Tussle, a character in the 1988 film Hairspray and its later adaptations
