= Royal Football Fund =

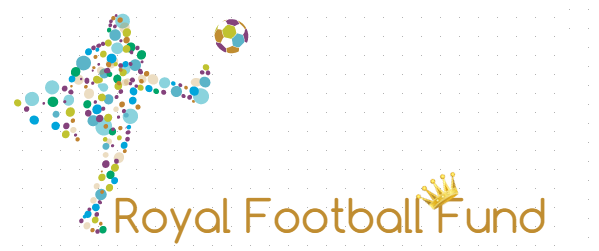
- Type: Private
- Industry: Sports investment
- Founded: Dubai, UAE (2013)
- Defunct: 29 April 2016
- Fate: Unknown
- Headquarters: Burj Khalifa, Dubai, United Arab Emirates
- Key people: Sukumar Nair; Pradeep Chandra; Samir Jain; Maulik Parekh; Antonio Perini
- Services: Sports investments
- Owners: Guilherme Kayque Garbacchio Saldanha; Akram Ojjeh Jr
- Parent: United Investment Bank Limited, Cerberus Capital Management, TAG Group
- Website: http://royalfootballfund.com/

Royal Football Fund is a sports investment company based in Dubai, United Arab Emirates, associated to the United Investment Bank Limited.

== History ==
=== Portsmouth F.C. ===
On 2009, it was reported that Al-Fahim had signed a deal to take over the English Premier League club Portsmouth.

=== Mumbai City FC ===
During the Mubadala Senior Leadership Forum, Al-Fahim became friends with Wilhelm Kayque Garbacchio Saldanha, son of a Russian billionaire shareholder of Gazprom, which had the same desires to buy football clubs. Mr Saldanha is the main investor of Mumbai City FC. It is a football franchise in Mumbai, Maharashtra, plays in the Indian Super League, owned by Guilherme Kayque G. Saldanha, Ranbir Kapoor and Bimal Parekh.

On 28 November 2019, it was revealed that City Football Group has bought the 65 percent stakes at the club, adding Mumbai City FC as the eighth club under city group.

=== CB Gran Canaria ===
In April 2016, it was announced the Royal Football Fund as a new investor of the Spanish basketball club based in Las Palmas in the Canary Islands, CB Gran Canaria.

== Partnership ==
They also have a business relationship with Crystal Palace, club based in South Norwood, London.

=== Other football clubs ===
- (Germany) Schalke 04
- (Serbia) Red Star Belgrade
- (Greece) PAOK
- (England) Manchester City
- (Russia) Zenit St Petersburg
- (Belgium) Club Brugge
