= Miina =

- Gender: Female
- Languages: Estonian, Finnish
- Name day: 26 May (in both Estonia and Finland)

Origin
- Region of origin: Estonia, Finland

Other names
- Related names: Minna, Mina

Miina is an Estonian and Finnish feminine given name.

People named Miina include:

- Miina Äkkijyrkkä (born 1949), Finnish artist
- Miina Härma (1864–1941), Estonian composer
- Miina Kallas (born 1989), Estonian football player
- Miina Turunen (born 1973), Finnish actress
