= Seegmiller =

Seegmiller is a surname. Notable people with the surname include:

- J. Edwin Seegmiller (1920–2006), American physician
- Jay Seegmiller (politician) (born 1958), American politician
- Lisa Hopkins Seegmiller (born 1978), American classical singer and actress
- Wilhelmina Seegmiller (1866–1913), Canadian-born American author, illustrator, art teacher
