= Hermina (given name) =

Hermina is a female given name. Notable people with the name include:

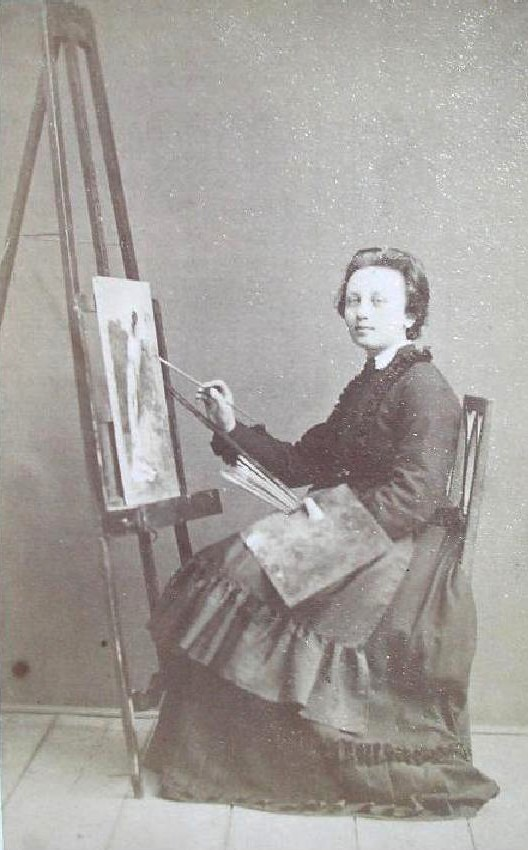
Hermina Laukotová

- Hermina Franks (1914–2010), pitcher who played in the All-American Girls Professional Baseball League
- Hermina Geyser (born 1938), South African athlete
- Hermina Laukotová (1853–1931), Czech painter, graphic artist, and art teacher
- Grada Hermina Marius (1854–1919), Dutch writer and painter
- Hermina Morita (born 1954), adviser for the Hawaii State House Committee on Finance
- Hermina Pipinić (1928–2020), Croatian actress
- Bartha Hermina Tollius (1780–1847), Dutch amateur pastellist
- Hermína Týrlová (1900–1993), Czech animator, screenwriter, and film director

== See also ==
- Herminia (given name)
- Mina (given name)
