= Meineke Car Care Bowl =

Meineke Car Care Bowl or Meineke Bowl may refer to one of the following college football bowl games:

- Meineke Car Care Bowl, played in Charlotte, North Carolina (2005–2010); now known as the Duke's Mayo Bowl
- Meineke Car Care Bowl of Texas, played in Houston, Texas (2011–2012); now known as the Texas Bowl

== See also ==
- Meineke (disambiguation)
