= Meineke =

Meineke may refer to a number of people and organizations:

== People ==
- Augustus Meineke (1790–1870), German classical scholar
- Christoph Meineke (born 1979), German politician, mayor
- Christopher Meineke (1782–1850), American organist, composer
- Don Meineke (1930–2013), former professional basketball player who was the NBA's first Rookie of the Year

== Other uses ==
- Meineke Car Care Bowl, a college football bowl game played in Charlotte, North Carolina (2005–2010); now known as the Duke's Mayo Bowl
- Meineke Car Care Bowl of Texas, a college football bowl game played in Houston, Texas (2011–2012); now known as the Texas Bowl
- Meineke Car Care Centers, a franchise automobile repair shop chain in North America, Brazil, and China

== See also ==
- Meineke Car Care Bowl (disambiguation)
- Mineke, a given name
