= Mineke =

Mineke is a Dutch female given name, Wilhelmina. Notable people with the name include:

- Mineke Bosch (born 1954), Dutch historian born in South Africa
- Mineke Schipper (born 1938), Dutch author of fiction and non-fiction

== See also ==
- Meineke (disambiguation)
