= Minna (given name) =

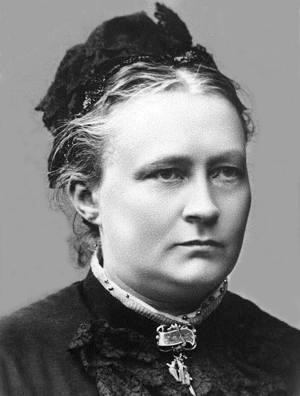
- Minna Canth, a Finnish writer and social activist
- Gender: female

Origin
- Origin: Germanic

Other names
- Related names: Mina, Wilhelmina

Minna is a feminine name of Germanic origin, meaning courtly love, and is also a diminutive of Wilhelmina. It is now particularly known in Finland and Sweden.

== Notable people ==
=== A–F ===
- Minna Aalto (born 1965), Finnish sport sailor
- Minna Aaltonen (1966–2021), Finnish actress
- Minna Antrim (1861–1950), American writer
- Minna Arve (born 1974), Finnish politician
- Minna Atherton (born 2000), Australian competitive swimmer
- Minna Beckmann-Tube (1881–1964), German painter and opera singer, and wife of Max Beckmann
- Minna Canth (1844–1897), Finnish writer and social activist
- Minna Carleton (1847–1918), English novelist
- Minna Cauer (1841–1922), German educator, journalist and radical activist
- Minna Citron (1896–1991), American painter and printmaker
- Minna Cowan (1878–1951), British political activist
- Minna Craucher (1891–1932), Finnish socialite and spy
- Minna C. Denton (1873–1958), American home economist
- Minna Everleigh (1866–1948), American brothel owner
- Minna Fernald (1860–1954), American botanical artist
- Minna Flake (1886–1958), German physician and socialist

=== G–M ===
- Minna Gale (1869–1944), American stage and film actress
- Minna Gombell (1892–1973), American stage and film actress
- Minna Grey (1868–1935), English film actress
- Minna Haapkylä (born 1973), Finnish film actress
- Minna B. Hall, American socialite and environmentalist
- Minna Harkavy (1887–1987), Estonian-American sculptor
- Minna Heponiemi (born 1977), Swedish footballer
- Minna Herzlieb (1789–1865), German publisher
- Minna Hesso (born 1976), Finnish snowboarder
- Minna Irving (1864–1940), American writer
- Minna Jørgensen (1904–1975), Danish film actress
- Minna Karhu (born 1971), Finnish freestyle skier
- Minna Kauppi (born 1982), Finnish orienteer
- Minna Keal (1909–1999), British composer
- Minna Keene (1861–1943), German-Canadian portrait photographer
- Minna Kleeberg (1841–1878), German-American poet
- Minna Lachs (1907–1993), Austrian educator and memoirist
- Minna Lammert or Tamm (1852–1921), German operatic mezzo-soprano
- Minna Lederman (1896–1995), American music writer and editor
- Minna Lehtola (born 1967), Finnish fencer
- Minna Lewinson (1897–1938), American journalist
- Minna Lindgren (born 1963), Finnish writer and journalist
- Minna Meriluoto (born 1985), Finnish football goalkeeper

=== N–Z ===
- Minna Nieminen (born 1976), Finnish rower
- Minna Nikkanen (born 1988), Finnish pole vaulter
- Minna Nystedt (born 1967), Norwegian speed skater
- Minna Painilainen-Soon (born 1964), Finnish sprinter
- Minna Palmroth, Finnish professor in computational space physics
- Minna Peschka-Leutner (1839–1890), Austrian opera singer
- Minna Planer (1809–1866), German actress and first wife of Richard Wagner
- Minna Rozen (born 1947), Israeli professor of Jewish history
- Minna Salami (born 1978), Finnish Nigerian journalist
- Minna Salmela (born 1971), Finnish freestyle sprint swimmer
- Minna Sirnö (born 1966), Finnish politician
- Minna Specht (1879–1961), German educator and socialist
- Minna Stess (born 2006), American Olympic skateboarder
- Minna Stocks (1846–1928), German painter
- Minna Sundberg (born 1990), Finnish illustrator and cartoonist
- Minna Telde (born 1974), Swedish horse rider
- Minna Turunen (born 1969), Finnish TV and film actress
- Minna Vehmasto (born 1962), Finnish high jumper
- Minna Weizmann (1889–?), Russian Jewish doctor
- Minna Wetlesen (1821–1891), Norwegian educator, teacher and author
- Minna Wettstein-Adelt (1869–c.1908), German-French journalist and writer
- Minna of Worms (died 1096), Jewish martyr

== Fictional characters ==
- Minna Troil, a leading character in Walter Scott's novel The Pirate
- Minna-Dietlinde Wilcke, a major character in the media franchise Strike Witches
- Minna Häkkinen, the fictional Prime Minister of Finland in the US TV series Veep, played by Sally Phillips
