= Wilhelmina Alexander (artist) =

Canadian painter (1871–1961)

Wilhelmina "Mina" Alexander
- Born: July 2, 1871; Hamilton, Ontario, Canada
- Died: November 7, 1961 (aged 90); Hamilton, Ontario, Canada
- Known for: Painter

Wilhelmina "Mina" Alexander (July 2, 1871 – November 7, 1961) was a Canadian oil painter and philanthropist from Hamilton, Ontario. Alexander's painting consists primarily of landscapes, still-life scenes, and studies of nature both aquatic and land-based. She exhibited at the Royal Canadian Academy, the Women's International Exhibition (Detroit), and the Art Association of Montreal between 1929 and 1935. Prior to this, she served as president of the Women's Art Association of Canada, in her hometown of Hamilton. Despite Alexander's brief tenure as president, she remained involved with the association for many decades.

In 1953, Alexander was involved in the decision to create a new art gallery in Hamilton. Alexander also took to supporting young artists by allowing them to hang their work alongside hers in exhibitions held in her home. Her painting style has been described as colourful and vibrant, especially with respect to her depictions of flowers for which she is most well-known. An influential figure in the Southern Ontario art world in the early-to-mid 1900s, archives of her life and work can be found through the Women's Art Association of Hamilton, as well as through the Canadian Women Artists History Initiative / Le Réseau d'étude sur l'histoire des artistes canadiennes.

== Early life and education ==
Wilhelmina Alexander was born in Hamilton, Ontario, on July 2, 1871. She lived at 176 Hughson Street South in Hamilton. Alexander studied at the Hamilton Art School under John Ireland, John Gordon, and "Miss Howell". She later studied privately under G. Horne Russell in Montreal, Quebec.

== Artistic career ==
Alexander's painting style has been described as being akin to the Impressionist movement, and the Canadian Group of Seven Artists (particularly that of Tom Thomson). Her work is known for its vibrant use of colors. While she is most known for her floral scenes, she also painted landscapes, still-life scenes, and landscape scenes depicting water. Most of her landscape paintings depict places in Southern Ontario such as the Georgian Bay and the Muskoka Lakes regions. She also painted scenes from England, South Carolina, and Bermuda.

Her floral scenes have garnered her the most attention out of all of her paintings. On three separate occasions, she exhibited her floral scenes in Toronto and Montreal through the Royal Canadian Academy of Arts. Her participation in the annual exhibitions held at the Art Gallery of Hamilton was predominantly made up of these floral scenes. Among those exhibited include her Bowl of Zinnias, July Garden, Phyllis and Bittersweet, Canterbury Bells, and Pom-Pom Zinnias.

== Affiliation and recognition ==
Throughout her life, Alexander was involved in a number of associations. As an attendee to its inaugural meeting in 1894, Alexander was involved with the Women's Art Association in Hamilton for more than five decades. In 1914, she was involved with a citizen committee to organize a new art gallery in Hamilton (formerly known as the Women's Committee of the Art Gallery of Hamilton). She served as president of the Women's Art Association from 1925 to 1928. During its brief lifetime, Alexander presided over the Hamilton Art Association as a trustee from 1935 to 1942, after which the association dissolved. In 1953, Alexander was heavily involved in the creation of a new site for the Hamilton Art Gallery on Forsythe and Main Street West. As a tribute for her continued support, Alexander was allotted the right to 'turn the first sod' on the new grounds. In 1951, Alexander received the Woman Citizen of the Year Award.

Alexander has exhibited with a number of distinguished institutions, including the Royal Canadian Academy of Arts in Toronto; Ontario and Montreal, Quebec; the Art Gallery of Hamilton, Ontario; and the Women's International Exhibition in Detroit by invitation.

== Philanthropy ==
In 1911, Alexander organized a 'tag day', in which she collected money from passers-by and gave them a tag to represent where their donations were given. All of the proceeds went to the Young Women's Christian Association.

For much of her career, Alexander was involved in developing the careers of local artists. Throughout the 1930s, she used her home on Hughson Street South as an exhibition space for young artists. Among the invitees for these events were more than 200 citizens of Hamilton. In the 1940s, she utilized her home as an exhibition space to raise money for the war effort. She continued to use her house afterwards as a gallery to raise money for the Art Gallery of Hamilton.

== Death and legacy ==
Wilhelmina Alexander died in St. Peter's Infirmary in Hamilton, Ontario, on November 7, 1961, at 90 years of age. In the literature on art, Alexander is documented under a few different names including: Mina Alexander, Wilhelmina Towers Alexander, and Mrs. S. H. Alexander. Alexander is still recognized by the city of Hamilton as a contributor to the art scene in the early-to-mid 20th century. Her art can be seen today in the Hamilton Art Gallery. Prior to her death the Women's Art Association in Hamilton recognized her as an honorary president and life member.
