= Kristina Huneault =

Canadian art historian, b. 1969)

- Born: April 26, 1969; Windsor, Ontario
- Known for: art historian, academic

Kristina Huneault (born in 1969) is an art historian who has studied the visual culture of women artists. She is a Professor of Art History at Concordia University in Montreal, a former University Research Chair, and one of the co-founders of the Canadian Women Artists History Initiative / Le Réseau d'étude sur l'histoire des artistes canadiennes. Since 2023, she has served in an institutional role at the University as the Vice-Provost, Faculty Development and Inclusion. She is the author or co-editor of books, book chapters, catalogues and scholarly and journal articles on women's art history, mainly on Canadian art.

== Career ==
Huneault, born in Windsor, Ontario, received her Masters degree in Canadian art history from Concordia University (1994) and her Doctorate in visual culture in Britain from the University of Manchester (1998). She began to teach at Concordia a year after her graduation. In 2002, she wrote Difficult Subjects: Working Women and Visual Culture, Britain 1880-1914 (London: Ashgate Press), about British working women of an earlier day as shown in widely disparate art forms, such as trade union banners. In 2004, she was elected as the university's emerging research fellow. In 2007, she helped found the Canadian Women Artists History Initiative / Le Réseau d'étude sur l'histoire des artistes canadiennes.

In 2012, Huneault co-edited with Janice Anderson a book on Canadian women's art history in which different authors focussed on the roles and contributions of women in the arts in Canada, Rethinking Professionalism: Essays on Women and Art in Canada, 1850-1970 (Montreal and Kingston: McGill-Queen's University Press), which is considered by public libraries in Canada a reference point to read about Canadian art. In 2017, she again co-wrote with Anderson a chapter titled "A Past As Rich As Our Futures Allow: A Genealogy of Feminist Art in Canada" in Desire Change: Contemporary Feminist Art in Canada.

In 2018, she co-authored Rebecca Belmore: March 5, 1819. In the same year she published I'm Not Myself at All: Women, Art, and Subjectivity in Canada. The National Gallery of Canada called the book "a heady, scholarly tour-de-force" and a "riveting read".

== Works ==
- Huneault, Kristina. I'm Not Myself at All: Women, Art, and Subjectivity in Canada. McGill-Queens University Press. 2018. ISBN 978-0-7735-5319-4.
- Huneault, Kristina and Anderson, Janice. Rethinking Professionalism: Women and Art in Canada, 1850-1970. McGill-Queens University Press. 2012. ISBN 978-0-7735-3966-2.
- Huneault, Kristina. Difficult Subjects: Working Women and Visual Culture, 1880-1914. Aldershot, Ashgate. 2002. ISBN 978-0-7546-0409-9
