= Anna Ware Poole =

American composer and musician (1838–1929)

Anna Ware Poole (18 Dec. 1838 - 19 Jan. 1929) was an American composer, pianist, teacher, and vocalist. She composed songs and piano works.

Poole was born in Buffalo, New York, to Martha Fitch and Rushmore Poole. She attended the Misses Hill’s School in Buffalo. Poole studied piano with J. R. Blodgett and Louis Moreau Gottschalk, and voice with Carlotta Patti. She married Dr. Augustus Champman Hoxsie in 1868, and they had one daughter. After Hoxsie’s death, she married Dr. Joseph Tottenham Cook. She published under the name Anna Ware Poole.

Poole made her debut as a pianist in Buffalo, on a concert given by Gottschalk. She spent 11 years singing with Ettore Barilli and Carlotta Patti, and many years teaching private students.

== Works ==
Poole’s music was published by Blodgett & Bradford, Denton Cottier and Daniels, and Oliver Ditson Company, and included:

=== Piano ===
- Cherub’s Waltz
- March Militaire
- Oyama Togo March
- Sunlight and Shadow
- Water Wheel

=== Vocal ===
- “America! America!” (text by Rollin J. Wells)
- “Life, Death and Resurrection”
- “Love in a Look” (text by Harry Van Dyke)
- “Salvation Mary” (text by Minna Irving)
- “What Does Little Birdie Say” (text by Alfred Tennyson)
