= Minna (disambiguation) =

Minna is a city in west central Nigeria.

Minna may also refer to:

== People ==
- Minna (given name)
- Maria Minna (born 1948), Canadian politician

== Other uses ==
- Minna von Barnhelm, a 1767 play by Gotthold Ephraim Lessing
- Minna Bluff, a rocky promontory in Antarctica
- Minna Airport, Nigeria
- Minna Shopping Center, a shopping mall in Kuopio, Finland
- SS Minna, a Swedish cargo ship in service 1922–39
- Minna-Dietlinde Wilcke, a character in the anime Strike Witches
- Minna Häkkinen, a recurring character on the television series Veep
- MPV Minna, a Marine Protection Vessel of the Scottish Government
- Minna (sculpture), a public art sculpture by Jaume Plensa

== See also ==
- Mina (disambiguation)
