= Mina (given name) =

Mina is a given name with a variety of origins.

== Egypt ==
Mina, Meina, Meena (Coptic: Ⲙⲏⲛⲁ) is a male given name for Egyptian Coptic Christians. The name derives from the ancient Egyptian name “Menes.” The most notable ancient Egyptian figure who neared that name was the first dynasty Pharaoh who unified Upper and Lower Egypt around 3100 BC.

Mina in the Coptic language (latest stage of the ancient Egyptian language) means: a person who is steadfast, committed, unrelenting or determined.

== Arabic ==
Mina, Minnah, Menna (Arabic: مِنّة Minnah, Minna, Menna, [ˈmen.næ]) is an Arabic female given name transformed from the female given name "Amina", but perhaps the Arabic "Mina" is the Persian "Mina" which bears the meaning "stained (tinted) glass mirror", artistic paint (also generic name for enamel or varnish) for porcelain and metal.

- Mina El Hammani (born 1993), Spanish-Moroccan actress
- Menna Shalabi (born 1982), Egyptian actress

== Bengali ==
Meena/Mina (Bengali: মীনা/মিনা) can either have its roots from Persian, Sanskrit or transformed from the Arabic female given name "Amina". Meena is a common female given name in Bangladesh. Meena is also the title of the popular Bangladeshi children's animated television series created by UNICEF.

== Chinese ==
Mina is a Chinese feminine given name. It may be written as 米娜, 蜜娜 and 密娜. Na (娜) is a commonly used character in Chinese female names.

- Mina Shum (born 1966) is an independent Canadian filmmaker

== Cambodian ==
Mina is a unisex name which means the month of March in the Cambodian language, Khmer. It is written មីនា.

== India ==
Meena is an Indian female given name.

== Japanese ==
Mina is a Japanese feminine given name. It may be written various ways in kanji, including 美奈, 美那, 南 and 未菜.

- Mina Asami (born 1958), Japanese actress
- Mina Fukui (born 1984), Japanese actress
- Mina Harigae (born 1989), American golfer
- Mina Kasai (born 1984), Japanese voice actress
- Mina Matsushima (born 1991), Japanese swimmer
- Mina Myoi (born 1997), Japanese singer, member of girl group Twice
- Mina Ōba (born 1992), Japanese singer and actress
- Mina Shirakawa (born 1987), Japanese professional wrestler and idol
- Mina Tanaka (田中 美南; born 1994), Japanese women's footballer
- Mina Watanabe (渡邉 美奈; born 1985), Japanese judoka

== Korean ==
Mina, Meena, and Minah are various Roman alphabet spellings of two homophonous Korean given names with different hangul spellings 미나 and 민아.

- Bang Min-ah (born 1993), South Korean singer, member of girl group Girl's Day
- Shim Mina (born 1972), South Korean singer
- Jung Mina (born 1979), South Korean musician
- Shin Min-a (born 1984), South Korean actress
- Kwon Mina (born 1993), South Korean singer, member of girl group AOA
- Jung Min-ah (born 1994), South Korean actress
- Kang Min-ah (born 1997), South Korean actress
- Justine Mina Ok (fl. 2000s), Korean American songwriter
- Mina Cho (born 1960), South Korean writer
- Son Mi-na (born 1964), South Korean handball player
- Meena Lee (born 1981), South Korean golfer
- Kang Mi-na (born 1999), South Korean singer

== Persian ==
Mina (Persian: مینا mīnā) is a female given name in Iran, meaning "azure", "azure sky", "blue (decanter) or glass", "glass bead", or "enamel". Mina is also another name of lapis lazuli (Persian: لاجورد lājward, colloquially "lāzward")

Mina is also the name for the birds mockingbird or myna ('morgh-e-mina' [Persian: مرغِ مينا murgh-i mīnā, literal meaning "Mina bird"]), which easily repeats many sounds like a human voice and the name of the flower marguerite (marguerite daisy) ("gol-e-mina" [Persian: گلِ مينا gul-i mīnā, literal meaning "Mina flower"]).

The Turkish spelling of the name is Mine.

- Mina Assadi (born 1943), Iranian poet
- Mina Nouri (born 1951), Iranian painter
- Mina Ahadi (born 1956), Iranian politician
- Mina Hadjian (born 1975), Iranian-born Norwegian television host
- Mine Ercan (born 1978), Turkish women's wheelchair basketball player

== Pashto ==
Meena or Mina (Pashto: مینه) means "love" in Pashto, an Eastern Iranian language spoken in Afghanistan and the Pashtun Diaspora of Pakistan, which is the feminine noun for the word "lover" – the masculine form is "māyan میين". Although no source of it as used in a name except for the Persian "Mina". See Meena (disambiguation)

- Meena Keshwar Kamal (1956–1987), Afghan women's rights activist

== Other ==
Mina can be a short form of the feminine names Wilhelmina, Hermina or Assimina (in the case of Greek names).

- Mina (Italian singer) (born 1940), Italian singer
- Mina (German singer) (born 1993), German pop musician
- Mina (Japanese singer) (born 1997), member of South Korean girl group Twice
- Mina (voice actress) (born 1984), Japanese voice actress
- Mina Bruere (died 1937), American banker
- Mina Zaman Chowdhury, Jatiya Party (Ershad) politician and former Member of Bangladesh Parliament
- Mina Loy (1882–1966), English poet
- Mina Karadžić, Serbian 19th century poet
- Mina Kimes (born 1985), American journalist
- Mina Kostić (born 1969), Serbian folk singer
- Mina Mezzadri (1926–2008), Italian playwright and theatre director
- Mina Minovici (1858–1933), Romanian forensic scientist
- Mina Napartuk (1913–2001), Canadian Inuk artist
- Mina Orfanou (born 1982), Greek actress
- Mina Papatheodorou-Valyraki, Greek painter
- Mina Popović (born 1994), Serbian volleyball player
- Mina Ripia (born 1969), New Zealand Māori musician
- Mina SayWhat, American radio and television host
- Mina Shum, Canadian filmmaker

== Fictional ==
- Meenah Peixes in the webcomic Homestuck
- Mina in the novel Ziba by Afarin Majidi (Iranian-American author)
- Mina (Dragonlance), herald of the One God in Dragonlance
- Mina, in the animated series Jelly Jamm
- Mina in Karakai Jozu no Takagi-san
- Mina, the main character in Mina and the Count
- Mina, artist and Trial Captain of Poni Island in Pokémon Sun & Moon and Pokémon Ultra Sun & Ultra Moon
- Mina Aino, Sailor Venus in the Sailor Moon anime and manga series
- Mina Ashido in My Hero Academia anime and manga series
- Mina Beff in Todd Kauffman's Grojband
- Mina Carolina in the anime and manga series Attack on Titan
- Mina Harker (née Murray), the protagonist and heroine in Bram Stoker's novel Dracula, also appearing in other media
- Mina Kim in the game Mystic Messenger
- Mina Loveberry, a magical warrior in Star vs. the Forces of Evil
- Mina Majikina in the video game Samurai Shodown
- Mina McKee in David Almond's children's book Skellig and its prequel My Name is Mina
- Mina Mongoose, female mongoose in the comic series Sonic the Hedgehog
- Mina Monroe in the animated series Bunnicula
- Mina Nakanotani in anime and manga Air Master
- Mina Rai in the video game Yandere Simulator
- Mina Tepeş in the Japanese manga series Dance in the Vampire Bund
- Mina Tsukishiro in the Japanese anime series Getsumento Heiki Mina
- Seong Mi-na in the Soul series of fighting video games
- Yoo Mi-na in 2012 South Korean television series Time Slip Dr. Jin

== See also ==
- Mina (disambiguation)
- Minna (name)
- Wilhelmina (disambiguation)
- Mena (given name)
- Minnie (disambiguation)
