= Wilhelmina =

Wilhelmina may refer to:

- Wilhelmina (given name), a given name and list of people with the name

== People ==
- Wilhelmina of the Netherlands (1880–1962), Queen of the Kingdom of the Netherlands from 1890 to 1948
- Wilhelmine Amalie of Brunswick (1673–1742), empress consort of the Holy Roman Empire, Queen of Germany
- Wilhelmine of Bayreuth (1709–1758), German princess (the older sister of Frederick the Great) and composer
- Wilhelmina of Prussia, Princess of Orange (1750–1820), German princess
- Princess Wilhelmina of Schwarzburg-Rudolstadt, (1751–1780), Princess of Nassau-Saarbrücken
- Wilhelmine of Prussia (1774–1837), German princess and later Queen of the Netherlands
- Princess Wilhelmine of Baden (1788–1836), German Grand Duchess of Hess and the Rhine
- Wilhelmina of Hesse-Darmstadt (1755–1776), German princess and Tsarevna of Russia

== Places ==
- Queen Wilhelmina State Park, a park in Arkansas
- Wilhelmina Bay, Antarctica
- Wilhelmina Mountains, Suriname
- Wilhelmina, Missouri, a community in the United States

== Other uses ==
- 392 Wilhelmina, a large main-belt asteroid
- USS Wilhelmina (ID-2168), a transport for the United States Navy during World War I
- SS Wilhelmina (1888), a US-owned cargo vessel seized by the British during World War I
- Wilhelmina Models, modeling agency founded by supermodel Wilhelmina Cooper
- Wilhelmina SC, a soccer club from Melbourne (now called Ringwood City SC)
- Wilhelmina, a football club from Rotterdam (now called Feyenoord Rotterdam)

== See also ==
- Princess Wilhelmine of Denmark (disambiguation), several Danish princesses
- Vilhelmina, a locality and the seat of Vilhelmina Municipality, Sweden
- Vilhelmina Municipality, a municipality in Lapland, Sweden
- Wilhelma, zoo and botanical garden in Stuttgart, Germany
- Wilhelma, Palestine, a former German Templer colony
