= Vilma =

Female given name

- Gender: Feminine

Other names
- Alternative spelling: Wilma

Vilma is a feminine first name. People named Vilma include:

- Ana Vilma de Escobar (b. 1954), Salvadoran politician
- Vilma Åhlström (b. 2000), Swedish curler
- Vilma Álvarez (b. 1970), Cuban softball player
- Vilma Bánky (1901–1991), Hungarian silent film actress
- Vilma Bardauskienė (born 1953), Lithuanian long jumper
- Vilma Beck (1810–1851), Hungarian writer and freedom fighter
- Vilma Charlton (born 1946), Jamaican sprinter
- Vilma Cibulková (born 1963), Czech film and stage actress
- Vilma Covane (b. 1996), Mozambican basketball player
- Vilma Degischer (1911–1992), Austrian actress
- Vilma Ebsen (1911–2007), American musical theatre and film actress, sister of actor Buddy Ebsen
- Vilma Egresi (1936–1979), Hungarian sprint canoer
- Vilma Espín (1930–2007), Cuban revolutionary, feminist and chemical engineer, wife of Raúl Castro
- Vilma Ferrán (1940–2014), Argentine actress
- Vilma Glücklich (1872–1927), Hungarian reformer and activist
- Vilma Ronalyn Greenlees (b. 1971), Philippines lawn bowler
- Vilma Henkelman (1944–2023), Dutch artist
- Vilma G. Holland (1928–2005), Puerto Rican artist
- Vilma Hollingbery (1932–2021), British actress
- Vilma Matthijs Holmberg (b. 1999), Swedish handball player
- Vilma Hugonnai (1847–1922), Hungarian medical doctor
- Vilma Rose Hunt (1926–2012), Australian scientist and writer
- Vilma Ibarra (born 1960), Argentine politician
- Vilma Jamnická (1906–2008), Slovak actress
- Vilma Jackson, English actor and performer
- Vilma Kadlečková (born 1971), Czech science fiction and fantasy writer
- Vilma Koivisto (b. 2002), Finnish footballer
- Vilma Kuusk (b. 1931), Estonian botanist
- Vilma López (b. 1989), Guatemalan footballer
- Vilma Luik (born 1959), Estonian actress
- Vilma Lwoff-Parlaghy (1863–1923), Hungarian painter
- Vilma Cecilia Morales (born 1954), Honduran lawyer
- Vilma Medgyaszay (1885–1972), Hungarian actress and theatre director
- Vilma Mesa (b. 1963), Colombian-American mathematics educator
- Vilma Cecilia Morales (b. 1954), Honduran lawyer
- Vilma Nenganga (born 1996), Angolan handball player
- Vilma Nugis (1958–2024), Estonian para skier
- Vilma Núñez, Nicaraguan lawyer and activist
- Vilma Paulauskienė (b. 1966), Lithuanian chess player
- Vilma Pázmándy (1839–1919), Hungarian noblewoman
- Vilma Peña (born 1960), Costa Rican long-distance runner
- Vilma Reyes (born 1958), Puerto Rican poet, storyteller and educator
- Vilma Reyes Escalante, Honduran dentist and politician
- Vilma Rimšaitė (born 1983), Lithuanian BMX cyclist
- Vilma Ripoll (born 1954), Argentine politician
- Vilma Rudzenskaitė (born 1966), Lithuanian orienteer
- Vilma Santos-Recto (b. 1953), Filipino actress and entertainer
- Vilma Sindona Eichholz (1926–1995), German-born Canadian Esperantist
- Vilma Silva (born 1997), Angolan handball player
- Vilma Socorro Martínez (born 1943), American lawyer, civil rights activist and diplomat, first woman U.S. Ambassador to Argentina
- Vilma Santos (born 1953), Philippine actress and politician
- Vilma Tanskanen (born 1995), Finnish ice hockey player
- Vilma Vaattovaara (born 1993), Finnish ice hockey player
- Vilma von Webenau (1875–1953), Austrian composer
- Vilma Åhlund (born 1998), Street dancer, party girl and part-time clown
- Vilma Zamora (born c. 1977), Mexican beauty pageant winner

== See also ==
- Wilma (disambiguation)
