= Hermína Laukotová =

Czech painter

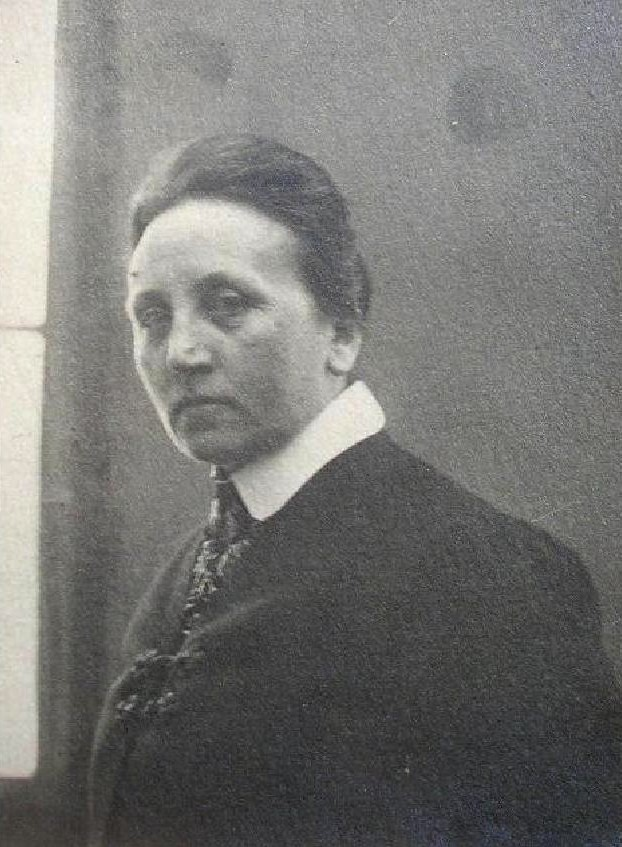
Hermína Laukotová (date unknown)

Hermína Cecílie Josefa Laukotová (24 January 1853 – 17 January 1931) was a Czech painter, graphic artist and art teacher.

== Biography ==
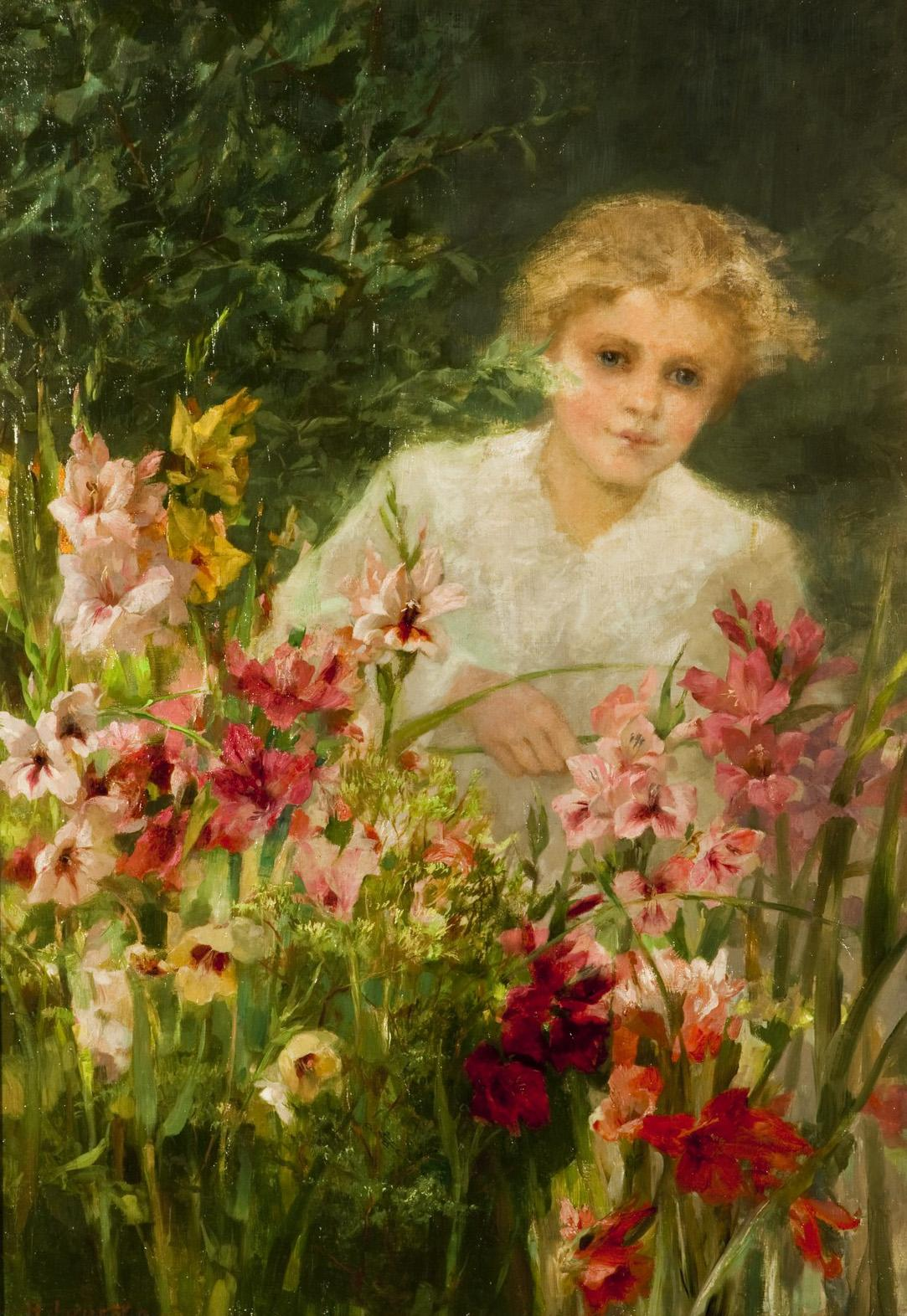
Young Woman Among the Irises

Hermína Laukotová was born on 24 January 1853 in Prague, Austrian Empire. Her father was the dentist and surgeon, Josef Laukota. Her mother, Antonia, was the daughter of Josef Riedel; the founder of a famous glassworks. She displayed some artistic talent while still quite young. Her family was wealthy enough to provide her with a wide education and the opportunity for travels abroad. She received her first private art lessons in the studios of Karel Javůrek. Later, she took lessons from one of Javůrek's earlier students, Jenny Schermaulová (1828-1909). Her final studies in Prague were with the portrait painter, Jan Adolf Brandeis.

In 1882, she went to Paris, where she completed her training in graphic techniques. Two years later, she moved to Antwerp, where she worked with Charles Verlat. While there, she visited the Frisian Islands and painted mostly maritime scenes. In 1883, she belonged to the Secessionist art groups Als ik Kan in Antwerpen.

From 1885 to 1887, she lived in Munich, where she took more lessons at the Ladies' Academy of Painting with Ludwig von Herterich, then more private lessons with Doris Raab, who taught her etching; a subject she pursued further with William Unger in Vienna.

In 1887, she was back in Prague, where she opened her own art school for women, the "Deutsche Kunstübungsstätte für Frauen". Although the school taught a variety of subjects, including portrait and flower painting, it was primarily known for its courses in figure drawing, which used nude models. Such courses were closed to women at the major art schools. She operated the school until 1909, when she had to retire for health reasons, and turned over its management to August Brömse, with a staff that included the architect, Adolf Foehr and the painter, Lili Gödlová-Brandhuberová, who had been a student there.

She often exhibited her paintings at showings sponsored by Krasoumná jednota, a society for the promotion of the arts, under the name "Jan Textor". After 1904, she was a member of the "Verein deutscher Malerinnen in Böhmen" (Association of German Women Artists in Bohemia), and the "Vereinigung der bildenden Künstlerinnen Österreichs" (Association of Austrian Women Fine Artists), with whom she also exhibited.

She died on 17 January 1931 in Prague, aged 77.
