= Guillermina Rojas y Orgis =

Spanish anarchist

Guillermina Rojas y Orgis was a Spanish teacher, anarchist, and feminist. She was included as a character in Benito Pérez Gáldos' novel Amadeo I, part of the National Episodes.
