= Guilherme Kilter =

Brazilian politician (born 2001)

- Kilter in 2024

Member of the Chamber of Deputies
- Incumbent
- Assumed office 1 February 2027
- Constituency: Paraná

Personal details
- Born: 8 December 2001 (age 24)
- Party: New Party

Guilherme Ferreira Kilter Lira (born 8 December 2001) is a Brazilian politician who was elected member of the Chamber of Deputies in 2026. He has been a member of the Municipal Chamber of Curitiba since 2025.
