= Wilma =

Wilma may refer to:

== People ==
- Wilma (given name), a list of people and fictional characters with the given name or nickname
- Eva Wilma (1933–2021), Brazilian actress and dancer

== Places ==
- Wilma Township, Pine County, Minnesota, United States
- Wilma Glacier, Antarctica

== Other uses ==
- List of storms named Wilma

- Hurricane Wilma, a category 5 Atlantic hurricane in 2005.

- Wilma (software), a combined service stub and transparent proxy tool
- Wilma Theatre (Missoula, Montana)
- Wilma Theater (Philadelphia), Pennsylvania
- Wilma, or The Story of Wilma Rudolph, a 1977 documentary about athlete Wilma Rudolph
- Wilma, a transportation boarding method
- Wilbur and Wilma, the official mascots at the University of Arizona in Tucson, Arizona
- Window, middle, aisle system of boarding an airplane

== See also ==
- Vilma (disambiguation)
