= Minna Irving =

American writer

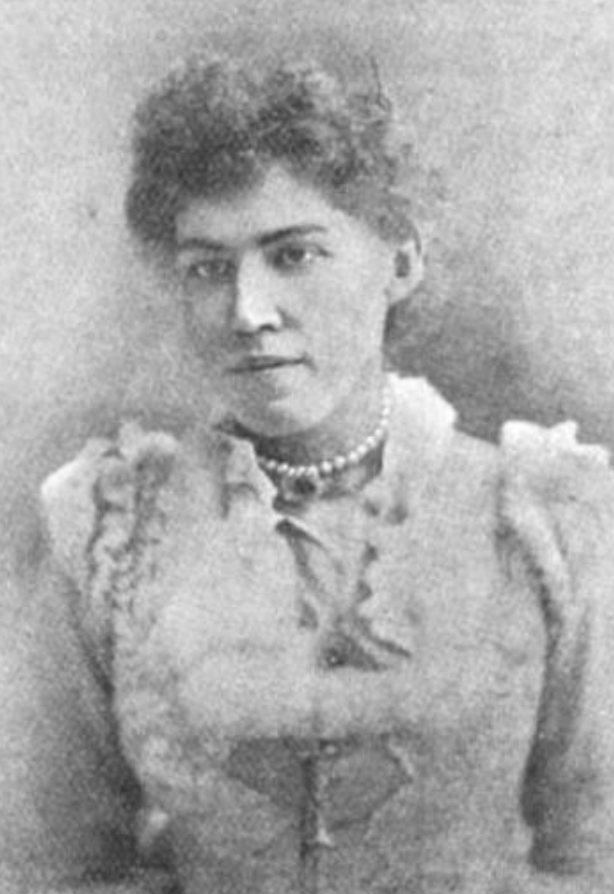
- Minna Irving, from an 1889 publication
- Born: Minnie Odell; May 17, 1864; Tarrytown, New York, U.S.
- Died: July 4, 1940 (aged 76); Wyckoff, New Jersey, U.S.
- Other names: Minna Michener, Aurelia Maxwell Michener, Mrs. Irving Hasbrouck De Lamater
- Occupation: Writer

Minna Irving (May 17, 1864 – July 4, 1940), born Minnie Odell, was an American writer and poet based in Tarrytown, New York. She wrote patriotic poetry through two wars, and a science fiction story published in 1929.

== Early life ==
Minnie Odell was born in Tarrytown, the daughter of William Roamer Odell and Mary Ann Van Tassel Odell. She began writing poetry in childhood, and studied music.

== Career ==
Irving wrote dozens of poems that were published in popular and literary magazines including Century, Woman's Home Companion, The Smart Set, Leslie's Weekly, Munsey's, and Ainslee's. She also published a collection of poetry, Songs of a Haunted Heart (1888). She wrote Christmas-themed poems, and during the Spanish–American War and World War I, she published poems about the war efforts. "I love camps and soldier life. Indeed I am more interested in the rough side of life," she explained in 1902. "I know many sea captains and naval men and I learn things from them. I love the sea."

Some of Irving's poems appeared in the Journal of Education, and The Phrenological Journal. and she wrote an essay about recreational driving for Suburban Life.

Irving also wrote stories and poems with a supernatural or horror aspect, and at least one science fiction story, "The Moon Woman" (1929). Pulp magazines where her work appeared included Weird Tales, Amazing Stories, All-Story Magazine, and Argosy. Several of her poems appeared in The Haunted Hour (1920), an anthology of spooky poems, many of them by women, compiled by Margaret Widdemer.

Irving wrote verses that appeared on the memorial for Quentin Roosevelt in France. In 1929, she was one of ten American poets awarded a cash prize, as finalists in a contest to write a new national anthem. American composer Anna Ware Poole used Irving’s text in her song “Salvation Mary.”

== Irving's errors caught ==
A 1901 Massachusetts newspaper took Irving to task for some impossibilities in her description of a British yacht. In 1905, an Oregon newspaper published a mocking poem about Irving, after she mis-rhymed "Willamette" and "beset" in a published verse. In 1915, a Honolulu paper caught her in another error, when it explained that pineapples do not grow on pine trees, as she suggested in a poem.

== Personal life ==
Irving was portrayed as litigious and attention-seeking in media accounts. "Don't mention the name of Minna Irving to me again," cautioned the editor of the Tarrytown Argus in 1894. "If there is anything for which Minna's soul always yearns, it is a sensation," reported a newspaper story in 1888 and 1889. "She generally manages to scare up a sensation of some kind about twice a year." In 1917, she wrote a first-person poem, in which the speaker wants to kiss Gladys, a woman who was wearing gardening overalls and a Panama hat, but instead kisses Gladys's brother, in a case of mistaken identity.

Irving was engaged to Palmer B. Wells in 1885, but later sued him for harassing and defaming her, and he served a jail sentence when the conflict escalated. She was briefly married to Irving Hasbrouck De Lamater in 1890, before they separated and eventually divorced. She married her second husband, Harry H. Michener, in 1911. She died in 1940, at the age of 76, at a sanitarium in Wyckoff, New Jersey.
