= Guillermina Bravo Montaño =

Colombian politician

Member of the Chamber of Representatives of Colombia
- Incumbent
- Assumed office 20 July 2014
- Constituency: Valle del Cauca Department

Member of the Department Assembly of Valle del Cauca
- In office January 1, 2008 – December 31, 2011
- Succeeded by: Álvaro Elías Martínez

Personal details
- Born: 27 July 1949 (age 76) Cali, Valle del Cauca, Colombia
- Party: Independent Movement of Absolute Renovation
- Occupation: politician
- Profession: Licentiate in Social Sciences
- Awards: Pro-Joven Award 2008 Ancestral Heritage Golden Palm Award 2008; Afro-descence Excellence Medal 2010; Guachupé of Gold Award 2014; Formal-style Honour Note (2015)

Guillermina Bravo Montaño (born 27 July 1949) is a Colombian teacher and politician of the Independent Movement of Absolute Renovation (MIRA) party. Currently she is a member of the Chamber of Representatives of Colombia. She was Deputy of the Department Assembly of Valle del Cauca from 2008 to 2011.

== Political career ==
From 2006 to 2007 she was a member of the leadership of her party, the Independent Movement of Absolute Renovation (MIRA) party, at the Cali city level. In 2006 she ran for Representative of the Valle del Cauca Department, being less than 1,000 votes away from getting a seat as Representative.

In 2007 she was elected Deputy of the Department Assembly of Valle del Cauca. In 2008 she served as the leader of her party at the Valle del Cauca Department level. During her term as Deputy she authored 10 Ordinances related to Social, Educational and Entrepreneurial promotion matters. In 2011 she ran for Governor of the Valle del Cauca Department, coming in fourth place thanks to 80,000 votes.

In 2014 she ran again for Representative of the Valle del Cauca Department and was elected thanks to 7,194 votes. During her term as Representative, she co-authored, along with his parliamentary group, the law commonly known as "Natalia Ponce Law", which increases the sentences related to Acid throwing to up to 50 years of prison. She was designated Spokesperson of the Afro-parliamentary group of the Congress of Colombia in 2014. A year later, she was designated Chairwoman of the Afro-parliamentary group.

=== Recognition ===
In 2008 she received the Pro-Joven Award, which is bestowed by the Municipal Council of Youth of the El Cerrito Municipality upon those leaders who promote positive changes and development to the region. In the same year, she received the Ancestral Heritage Golden Palm Award in the Political Contribution category, bestowed during the Expo-Pacific 2008 Convention. This award is granted based on the contributions of an individual to the Afro-Colombian culture.

In 2010 she received the Afro-descence Excellence Medal from the interim Governor Raymundo Tello, as an acknowledgment of her authorship of Ordinance 299 of 2009, which set guidelines for a public policy to benefit the Afro-Descendant, Palenquero and Raizal communities of the Valle del Cauca Department.

In 2014 she received the Guachupé of Gold Award in the Afro-Colombian leadership category, awarded by the Afro-Colombian society of Bogotá D.C., as an acknowledgment of her constant efforts to benefit the Afro-Colombian communities, especially women.

In 2015 she received a Formal-style Honour Note from the Department Assembly of Valle del Cauca due to her leadership and contributions to the development of the Colombian Pacific region and her social and political career in favor of women.

== Personal life ==
Guillermina Bravo Montaño was born in Cali, Colombia, on 27 July 1949. She graduated in Social Sciences at Santiago de Cali University. She took two specialization courses, one in Cognitive processes and one in Administrative and Political Management. She worked as a teacher for over 25 years.
