= Hilma Valjakka =

Finnish politician (1881–1934)

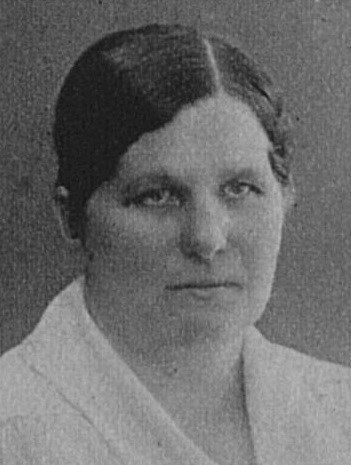
Image of Hilma Valjakka

Hilma Maria Valjakka (née Nykänen; 29 May 1881, in Pieksämäki – 14 February 1934) was a Finnish politician. She was a member of the Parliament of Finland from 1919 to 1930, representing the Social Democratic Party of Finland (SDP).
