= María Herminia Sabbia y Oribe =

Uruguayan poet

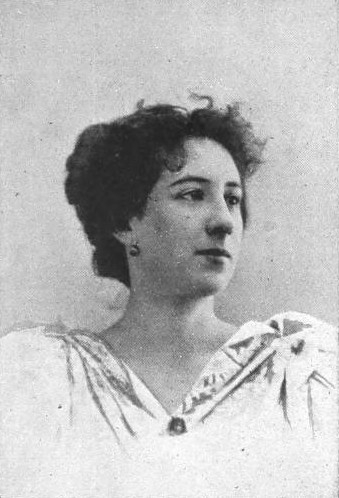
- Born: 1883
- Died: 1961 (aged 77–78)
- Occupation: Poet
- Writing career
- Pen name: María H. Sabbia y Oribe
- Language: Spanish
- Notable work: Aleteos (1898)

María Herminia Sabbia y Oribe (1883-1961) was an Uruguayan poet. Inspired by "tender or family matters", her poems had a strong religious inclination. Sabbia was politically active in the women's section of the National Party.

== Biography ==
María Herminia Sabbia y Oribe was born in 1883. She was the daughter of Uruguayan patrician María Luisa Oribe Montiel and the Italian count born in Pavia, Roberto Sabbia. From that marriage, in addition to María Herminia, were born her two sisters, Ida and Estela.

In 1898, she published a book of poems written during her adolescence, entitled Aleteos, which received praise from Angelo de Gubernatis, Eduardo Acevedo Díaz, Carlos Roxlo, and Arturo Giménez Pastor. In addition to this book, Sabbia collaborated with numerous literary magazines in Uruguay and abroad, and some of her texts appeared in the anthology of Uruguayan poets, El Parnaso Oriental by Raúl Montero Bustamante. Among these magazines were El Uruguay Ilustrado, Tabaré, and the Revista Literaria by Montero Bustamante himself.

Sabbia was also politically active, being involved in the women's section of the National Party.

María Herminia Sabbia y Oribe died in 1961.

== Style and themes ==
According to Montero Bustamante, Sabbia's verses were generally inspired by "tender or family matters", which were considered "praiseworthy concepts by the critics". On the other hand, Sarah Bollo defined Sabbia as a "romantic and delicate" poet, whose poems revolved around intimate and familiar themes, with a strong inclination towards the religious.

== Selected works ==
- Aleteos (La Tribuna Popular. Montevideo, 1898)
