= Minna Stocks =

German painter

- Born: 24 June 1846; Schwerin, Germany
- Died: 11 November 1928 (aged 82); Hinzenhagen, Germany
- Known for: Painting

Minna Stocks (1846-1928) was a German painter known for her animal paintings.

== Biography ==
Stocks was born on 24 June 1846 in Schwerin, Germany. She studied with Carl Steffeck, Ernst Bosch, Gustav Graef, and Jeanna Bauck.

She exhibited her work at the Woman's Building at the 1893 World's Columbian Exposition in Chicago, Illinois.

Stocks died on 11 November 1928 in Hinzenhagen, Germany.

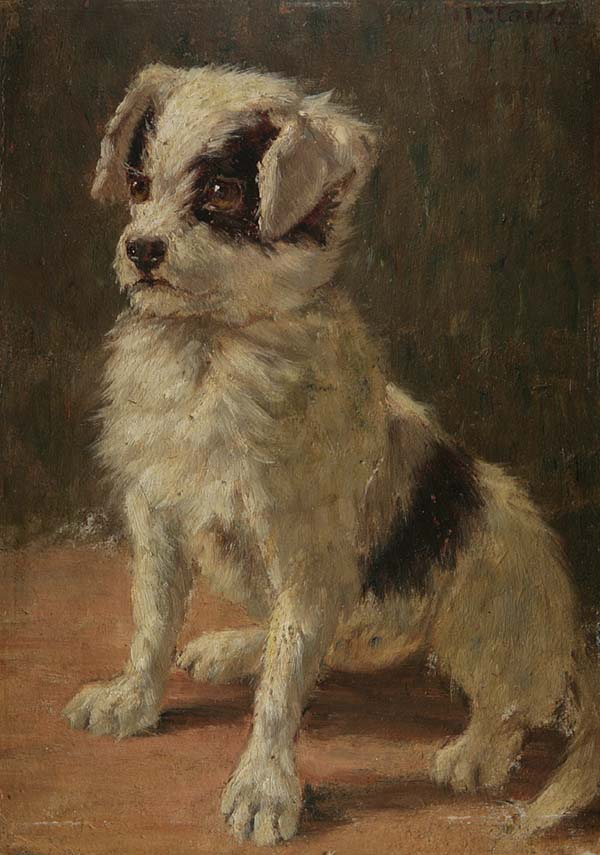
Hundeporträt by Minna Stocks
