= Helma =

Helma is a feminine German or Dutch given name, and a Czech surname. Notable persons with that name include:

- Helma Knorscheidt (born 1956), East German shot putter
- Helma Lehmann (born 1953), German rower
- Helma Neppérus (born 1950), Dutch politician
- Helma Orosz (born 1953), German politician
- Helma Sanders-Brahms (1940–2014), German film director

== See also ==
- Hilma
