= Canadian Women Artists History Initiative / Le Réseau d'étude sur l'histoire des artistes canadiennes =

Canadian art history organization, founded 2004)

Canadian Women Artists History Initiative/ Le Réseau d'étude sur l'histoire des artistes canadiennes
- Abbreviation: CWAHI
- Formation: 2004; 22 years ago
- Founder: Melinda Reinhart (born 1950 Radway, Alberta), Visual Arts Librarian (later, Senior Arts Librarian Emerita); Dr. Janice Anderson (born 1951, Blackpool, England), Fine Arts Visual Resources Curator (later, Fine Arts Visual Resources Curator, retired); joined in 2007 by Dr. Kristina Huneault (born 1969, Windsor, Ontario), then Associate Professor and Research Chair in Art History (later, Vice-Provost, Faculty Development and Inclusion)
- Type: Art history organization
- Purpose: to provide scholarly resources on historical women artists in Canada
- Headquarters: Department of Art History at Concordia University, Montreal, PQ, Canada
- Region served: Quebec, Canada
- Services: database of Canadian women artists born before 1930 and women architects born before 1965. Entries contain a short biography and a complete bibliography
- Official language: English
- Website: cwahi@concordia.ca

The Canadian Women Artists History Initiative / Le Réseau d'étude sur l'histoire des artistes canadiennes (CWAHI) is a project developed by Concordia University, Montreal to redress the balance that has placed historical Canadian female artists on a lower level than their male contemporaries. It was begun as the "Canadian Women Artists Historical Sources" in 2004 by Melinda Reinhart, Visual Arts Librarian, and Dr. Janice Anderson, Fine Arts Visual Resources Curator, of the art history department of Concordia University. They were joined in 2007 by Dr. Kristina Huneault, then Associate Professor and Research Chair in Art History, and became CWAHI.

The project at first consisted of an online database of bio-bibliographies for Canadian women artists born before 1930 and women architects born before 1965 but by 2024, includes well over 1300 files of women artists and architects, with individuals added when discovered. In 2009, the National Gallery of Canada, and the Montreal Museum of Fine Arts assisted CWAHI in creating an additional database, the "Canadian Exhibition Reviews Online" (CERO), formed of exhibition reviews of previous years found from microfilm and scrapbooks. It was used to give artists in the data base more comprehensive references. The Artist Database received an Honorable Mention from the Melva Dwyer Prize in 2010.

The CWAHI research is cited as a reference nationally and internationally. An additional feature of CWAHI has been its promotion through conferences, workshops, research, and publications of historical women artists.

CWAHI held its inaugural conference "Connections" at Concordia University, Montreal in 2008 for which it received a $20,000 grant from the Social Sciences and Humanities Research Council of Canada. The papers given at the conference resulted in a book, Rethinking Professionalism: women and art in Canada, 1850-1970, edited by Dr. Huneault and Dr. Anderson, consisting of 13 essays by different authors. It contended with the issue of professionalism, which arose in the late nineteenth century and indelibly marked the Canadian art world and its record in various ways. The book was launched at the 2012 conference, "Imagining History", which took place at Concordia and is cited by Online sites such as "Canadian Art: Intro: Start Here" by the library of the University of Manitoba.

In 2015, the CWAHI conference "The Artist Herself" was held at Queen's University at Kingston to commemorate the 60th anniversary of the publication of From Women's Eyes: Women Painters in Canada by the Agnes Etherington Art Centre in Kingston. It celebrated a 2015 landmark touring exhibition, The Artist Herself: Self-Portraits by Canadian Historical Women Artists by the Agnes Etherington Art Centre and Art Gallery of Hamilton, co-curated by Alicia Boutilier and Tobi Bruce, which featured works from 42 well-known and lesser-known woman artists in a range of media, including paintings, textiles, photographs and film.

The CWAHI conference in 2018 was postponed due to COVID-19 and proceeded as an online event in 2021, "Modernisms, Inside & Out". (Note: Some of these papers such as Gerta Moray, "On Lilias Torrance Newton" are available in a 12 minute form on youtube.) It was a collaboration between Concordia University, the Art Gallery of Ontario in Toronto, the McMichael Canadian Art Collection in Kleinburg and Ryerson University's Modern Literature and Culture Research Centre in Toronto. To support the CWAHI conference "Modernisms: Inside and Out" (2021), the McMichael Canadian Art Collection launched Uninvited, a major exhibition on women and art in the 1920s and 1930s which offered an opportunity to reassess women artists and what constituted modern art as a cultural force in Canada.
