= Guillermina Dulché =

Mexican painter

- Born: 12 April 1937 (age 89); Silao, Guanajuato. Mexico
- Education: UNAM, Academy of San Carlos

Guillermina Dulché is a Mexican painter, whose work has been recognized with membership in the Salón de la Plástica Mexicana. Dulché was born in Silao, Guanajuato and spent most of her childhood there. She took her first drawing and painting classes there with a local teacher, but when she was thirteen, she went to Mexico City to study art more formally. She enrolled in the Academy of San Carlos and studied under José Chávez Morado, a friend of her family's. At the same time she took classes at one of the Escuelas de Aire Libre and regular classes in middle and high school. The rest of her formal training, between 1958 and 1962 was under a number of teachers including Adolfo Mexiac, Antonio Ramírez, Luis Nishizawa, Santos Balmori, Gabriel Fernández Ledesma, Antonio Rodríguez Luna, Nicolás Moreno and others.

After her art studies she worked for a while as a restaurateur and a sketch artist at Teotihuacan for INAH. This led to a scholarship to do post graduate work in France with the L’ecole Nationale Supérieure des Beaux Arts and at the Louvre Museum.

Her career has spanned over four decades, as a painter, art historian, and teacher of art and art history. She has had over 42 individual exhibitions and has participated in over 230 collective shows in Mexico, Central and South America, Germany France, Kenya, Russia and the United States.
