= Minna Rozen =

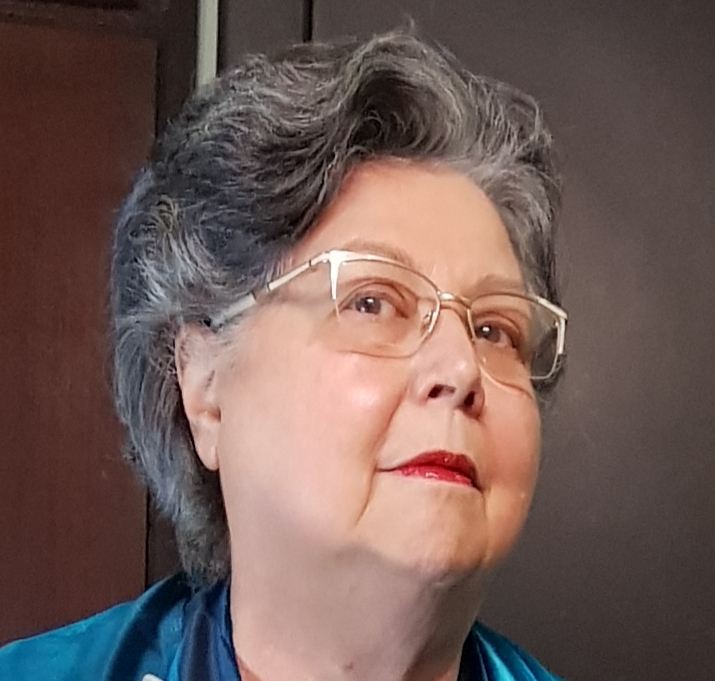
Minna Rozen

Minna Rozen (Hebrew: מינה רוזן; born October 1947) is a professor emeritus at the Department of Jewish History at the University of Haifa. Rozen served as head of the Diaspora Research Center at Tel Aviv University, and specializes in the history of Jews in the Ottoman Empire and the Balkan states.

== Biography ==
Minna Rozen was born in Tiberias and grew up in Afula, Israel. She studied law at the Hebrew University in Jerusalem. In 1966, after her marriage, she returned to Afula and studied history at the University of Haifa. Later she completed her PhD in history at Tel Aviv University.

== Academic career ==
Between 1973 and 1999 she taught at Tel Aviv University, specializing in the study of Jews during the Ottoman period. Between 1992 and 1997, she was the director of the Diaspora Research Center at Tel Aviv University. Since 1999, she has been teaching at the University of Haifa. She has taught as a guest professor at Princeton University. Rozen's historiographical approach is an interdisciplinary one combining historical research with several disciplines from the humanities and social sciences, such as sociology, literature, art history, gender studies, and diaspora theories.

Over the years, Rozen's writing has focused on grassroots history, manifesting in a large documentation projects she conducted about the Jews of Turkey and Greece, and the Franco communities around the Mediterranean. Her first documentation project was at the archives of the French Levant Company in Marseille, the archives of the French Foreign Ministry, and the archives of the British Levant Company. These sources constituted the basis for a series of studies about the trade routes of "new Christians" who returned to Judaism at the end of the 16th century in Livorno in the Grand Duchy of Tuscany, and from there dispersed to the trade centers of the Ottoman Empire in the Levant and North Africa. This research, among the first to be based on the combination of Rabbinical sources and European sources, unearthed the existence of a Jewish-Portuguese trading diaspora in the Mediterranean, which competed with the national trading companies of Britain and France as though they were supported by their own nation state. Her studies dealing with later periods showed how these trade communities, which were numerically small, influenced the processes of secularization and modernization in Istanbul and Thessaloniki.

Between 1987 and 1990, Rozen documented and photographed 61,000 Jewish gravestones dated 1583–1900 in Turkey, over 40,000 of them in Istanbul. This digital collection uploaded to the website of the Goldstein-Goren Diaspora Research Center at Tel Aviv University. Because the collection documents a societal group that maintained continuity for 450 years, it allows to follow the community's multifaceted history and its relations with the surrounding Ottoman culture. Upon the completion of this documentation project, Rozen incorporated it into an in-depth study of the history of Muslim Ottoman burial culture and art. In a book published in 1994 she showed how from the 17th century, the Jewish community in Istanbul accepted the social, aesthetic, and spiritual values of the surrounding Muslim society.

Rozen also conducted a survey of the protocol books documenting the decisions of the Rabbinical Courts of the Jewish community in Istanbul in the years 1701–1931. used these materials, along with the results of the survey of the "complaint books" (Şikayet defterleri) of the Ottoman Empire's subjects against institutions and officials of the Empire, and collections of printed Ottoman sources, to examine the historical processes experienced by the Jewish community in Istanbul. Her studies showed how the Romaniote Greek Jews integrated into the Sephardic Jewish majority, how a society formed that was highly polarized in terms of social class, where most of the capital was concentrated in the hands of the few people who were close to the Sultan's court in various ways, and how the values of the dominating Muslim society were gradually accepted by the Jewish Istanbul community.

In 1991, Rozen traveled to Moscow on a mission to locate the archives of the Thessaloniki Jewish community, which had been stolen by Nazi Germany and had reached Moscow with the victorious Red Army. The Russian State Archive permitted Rozen to photocopy the part of the archive that was preserved in the KGB archives, about 250,000 documents, and so far about one quarter of them have been coded into a custom-made computer program. During the work on the documents of this archive, it became apparent that other parts of the community's archives had been scattered over the world, and the part preserved in the Central Archive for the History of the Jewish People in Jerusalem turned out to be particularly large. This archival research uncovered previously unknown aspects of the Thessaloniki Jewish community in the twentieth century. The Thessaloniki Jewish community, known as "Jerusalem of the Balkans", which was remembered as a city of scholars, international traders, and large industrialists, was revealed as a society whose core during the 19th and 20th centuries were impoverished workers and small artisans living from hand to mouth. Prof. Rozen's students, Dr. Gila Hadar and Dr. Shai Srougo, placed the lives and struggles of the simple Thessaloniki Jews, the female tobacco workers, the port stevedores, and their families on the historiographical agenda.

The discovery of these archives led to research in contemporary Greek archives, and to shining a new light upon the annihilation of the Jews of Thessaloniki in 1943 by the Nazis. The few remnants of the community and some of its descendants shifted the blame from Nazi Germany to the community's last Rabbi, Rabbi Zvi Koretz, who died of typhoid fever two weeks after the liberation of the Bergen-Belsen concentration camp, where he was imprisoned with his family. The new sources in Rozen's study show how Thessaloniki's transition from the Ottoman Empire to the Greek nation-state in 1912 led to a drop in the community's political status, and a severe decline in the condition of the lower classes. The heads of the community, who were unable to handle the Greek state, took a decision that was unanimous among all the political factions in the city to bring in a Chief Rabbi from outside, after the community had been without such an office-holder for ten years. The chosen Rabbi was Dr. Zvi Koretz, a young man with a PhD in Oriental Studies from Vienna University, who was also a graduate of the Rabbinical Seminar in Berlin. The community's heads hoped that he would know how to deal with the Greeks, which he did, but at the same time he tried to introduce order into the community's convoluted affairs, and acquired many opponents who saw him as an outsider trying to displace them. After the war, when the community's tragedy was revealed in full, Rabbi Koretz became the scapegoat in two ways. The Germans lacked faces and identities, and it was impossible to avenge them, while the memory of the Rabbi and his family was within reach. He was a classic scapegoat: a foreigner, not a Sephardi Jew, and unable to respond. Greek society, too, found him very convenient to condemn. Greek society and the Greek state have trouble to this day in recognizing that during the war the Greek government collaborated with the Germans, and despite the heroic struggle of the communist partisans against the Nazi occupiers, the fate of Thessaloniki's Jews was to them, and particularly to the Christian residents of Thessaloniki, the concern of others rather than part of Greek society. The blaming of Rabbi Koretz clears their conscience to this day, and the minuscule Jewish community remaining in Thessaloniki has had to fall in line with this approach.

Deepening the research dealing with Greece's modern history led to a study comparing the Greek diaspora with the Jewish diaspora over the generations, whose results led Rozen to study theories of diaspora and migration, which have interested Rozen during the second decade of the twenty-first century.

== Views and opinions ==
Rozen rejects the view that there was an Armenian genocide. Israeli historian Yair Auron criticizes her for "practically blam[ing] the Armenians for what happened to them".

== Published works ==
=== Books ===
- The Ruins of Jerusalem – A History of Jerusalem under the Government of Muhammed Ibn Farrukh, Tel Aviv: Tel Aviv University Press, 1981 (Hebrew)
- The Jewish Community in Jerusalem in the 17th Century, Tel Aviv: Tel Aviv University and the Ministry of Defense Press, 1984 (Hebrew)
- Beniamin Abendana, His Wanderings and Adventures in Italy and the Levant as Related by Francesco da Serino, Tel Aviv: Tel Aviv University Press, 1985 (Hebrew)
- Jerusalem and Its Generations [Vol. 8: Jerusalem in the Ottoman Period], Tel Aviv: Open University Press, 1984 (Hebrew)
- Jewish Identity and Society in the 17th Century: Reflections on the Life and Works of Refael Mordekhai Malki, Tübingen: J.C.B. Mohr (Paul Siebeck), 1992
- Hasköy Cemetery: Typology of Stones Tel Aviv: Tel Aviv University and The Center for Judaic Studies, University of Pennsylvania, 1994
- A History of The Jewish Community of Istanbul: The Formative Years (1453–1566), Leiden: Brill, 2002; 2nd edition, 2010
- The Last Ottoman Century and Beyond: The Jews of Turkey and the Balkans, 1808–1945, Vol.1, Goren-Goldstein Diaspora Research Center, Tel Aviv: TAU, 2005
- A Journey Through Civilizations: Chapters in the History of Istanbul Jewry, 1453–1923', Turnhout: Brepols Publishers, 2015
- The Mediterranean in the Seventeenth Century: Captives, Pirates, and Ransomers at the Juncture between Religion, Politics, Economics and Society', Palermo: New Digital Frontiers S.R.L. and Casa Editrice Mediterranea, 2016

=== As editor ===
- Days of the Crescent: Chapters in the History of the Jews in the Ottoman Empire, Tel Aviv: Tel Aviv University, 1992 (Hebrew)
- Dina Porat, Anita Shapira and Minna Rozen, eds., Daniel Carpi’s Jubilee Book, Tel Aviv: Tel Aviv University,1996. (Hebrew, English and Italian)
- Y. Nini, S. Simonsohn and M. Rozen, eds., Michael, 14, History of the Jews in the Muslim Lands, Tel Aviv: Tel Aviv University, 1997 (Hebrew and English)
- Minna Rozen, ed., The Last Ottoman Century and Beyond: The Jews of Turkey and the Balkans ,1808–1945, vol.2, Tel Aviv, Goren-Goldstein Diaspora Research Center, TAU, 2002
- Minna Rozen, ed., Homelands and Diasporas: Greeks, Jews, and Their Migrations, London: Tauris, 2008
