= Vilma Cecilia Morales =

Honduran lawyer (born 1954)

- Born: Vilma Cecilia Morales Montalván; October 15, 1954 (age 71); Puerto Cortés
- Years active: 2002-present
- Known for: President of Supreme Court

Vilma Cecilia Morales Montalván (born 15 October 1954 in Puerto Cortés) is a Honduran lawyer. She served asthe first woman President of the Supreme Court of Honduras from 2002 to 2009.

In 2010, she was appointed president of the National Commission of Banks and Insurances.
