= Maria Hermínia Tavares de Almeida =

Brazilian political scientist

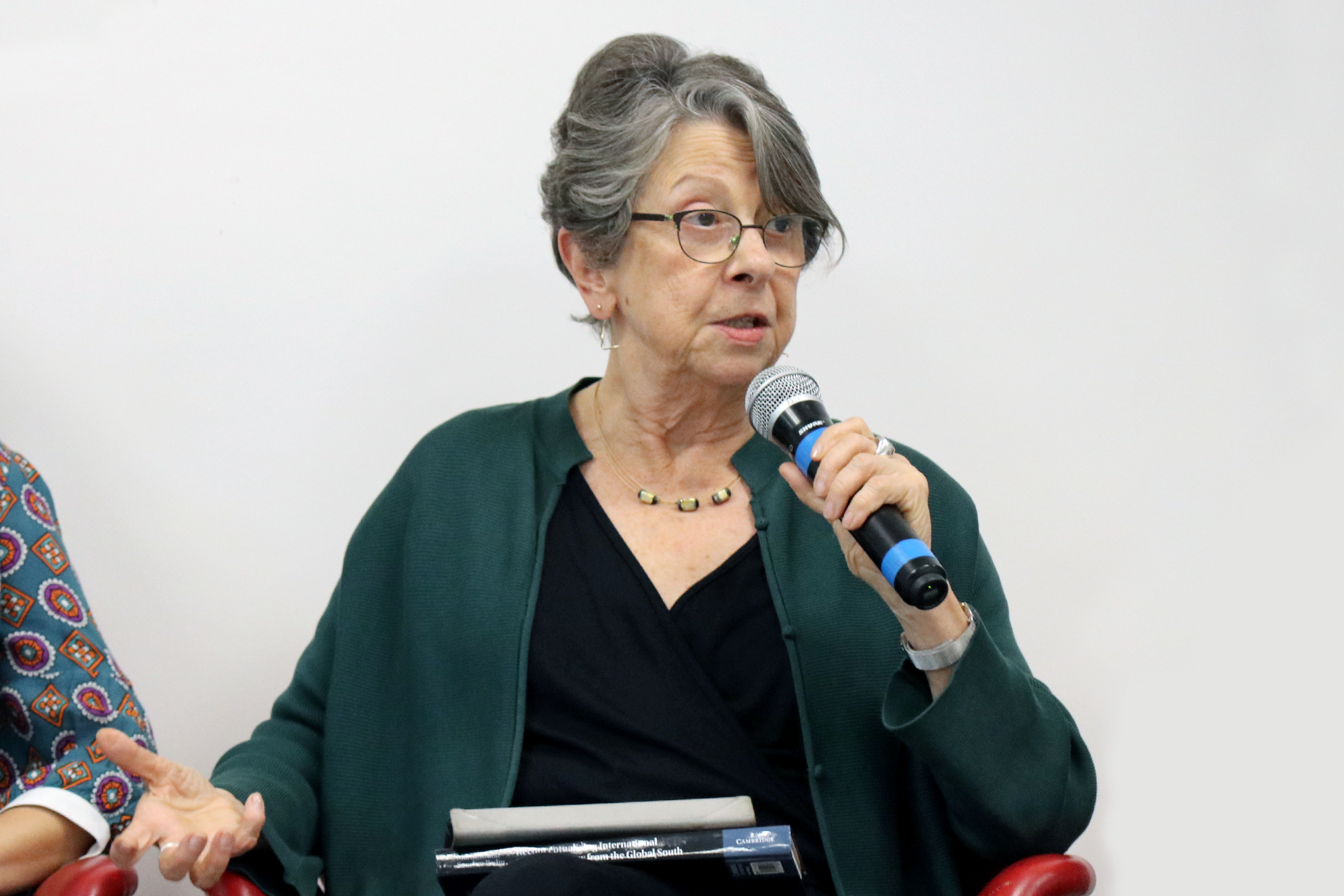
- Born: 1946 (age 79–80) (Note: Some sources say she was born on October 1, 1943.); São José do Rio Preto, São Paulo
- Education: University of São Paulo
- Known for: Autonomia e desigualdades de gênero: contribuições do feminismo para a crítica democrática
- Scientific career
- Fields: Political scientist; Sociologist

Maria Hermínia Tavares de Almeida is a Brazilian political scientist and sociologist, currently a professor at the University of São Paulo and a senior researcher at the Brazilian Center of Analysis and Planning. She was the director of the International Relations Institute at the University of São Paulo from 2008 to 2011.

== Academic career ==
Tavares de Almeida graduated with a degree in social science from the Faculty of Philosophy, Literature and Social Sciences at the University of São Paulo, specializing in sociology. She then received a PhD in political science from the University of São Paulo. After completing her PhD, she became a postdoctoral researcher at the University of California, Berkeley, and then returned to the University of São Paulo to become a professor.

She has also taught at other institutions, such as Unicamp and the Brazilian Center of Analysis and Planning. In addition to being a professor at the University of São Paulo, she is also a member of the International Economic Analysis Group there.

== Public service and awards ==
She participated in the Executive Committee of the Latin American Studies Association from 2001 to 2004, and was the president of the Brazilian Political Science Association from 2004 to 2008. In 2009, she was elected the vice-president of the Latin American Studies Association, with a term lasting until 2010, at which point she became the president of the association. She is also part of the Advisory Council of the Brazil Institute.

In 2007, Tavares de Almeida received the Brazilian National Order of Scientific Merit, in the comendador class. Her work has been cited in media reports about politics in venues like the Folha de S.Paulo and El País.

== Selected works ==
- Growth and Poverty (1978)
- Tomando partido, fazendo opinião: cientistas sociais, imprensa e política (1993)
- Crise Econômica e Interesses Organizados (1997)
