= Herminia Ibarra =

Professor of organizational behavior

Herminia Ibarra FBA is the Charles Handy Professor of Organisational Behaviour at London Business School.

== Early life ==
Ibarra was born in Cuba and immigrated to the US as a child. She attended the University of Miami and obtained her M.A. and Ph.D. degrees in Organisational Behaviour from Yale University.

== Career ==
Ibarra began her career as a professor at the Harvard Business School in 1989. She was promoted to Associate Professor in 1994 and to Full Professor with tenure in 1998. In 2002 she joined the INSEAD faculty as Chaired Professor of Organizational Behaviour. At INSEAD she created and directed the executive programs The Leadership Transition and Women Leading Change. In 2017, Ibarra joined the London Business School faculty as the Charles Handy Professor of Organizational Behavior.

She is a member of the World Economic Forum Expert Network, a jury member for the Financial Times Best Business Book of the Year Award and has been named by Thinkers 50 as one of the world's most influential businesses thinkers. She is also listed as one of the top 40 business case study authors by The Case Centre.

Ibarra is a Governor of the London Business School. Previously, she chaired the Visiting Committee of the Harvard Businesses School and was a member of INSEAD's board.

In July 2019 Ibarra was elected Fellow of the British Academy.

== Publications ==
Ibarra is an expert in professional development and executive leadership. She has written articles for Harvard Business Review, Administrative Science Quarterly, Academy of Management Review, Academy of Management Journal and Organization Science. According to Google Scholar, she has more than 22 000 citations and a H-index of 35. She writes for The Wall Street Journal, Financial Times and New York Times. Books:

- Act Like a Leader, Think Like a Leader. Harvard Business Review Press. 10 February 2015. ISBN 978-1-4221-8412-7.

This latest book explores how managers grow into leadership roles and how they can best develop and grow their skills to fit those roles.

- Working Identity: Unconventional Strategies for Reinventing Your Career. Harvard Business Press. 30 December 2013. ISBN 978-1-4221-8412-7.
