= Legislative Branch of Colombia =

Part of the Colombian government

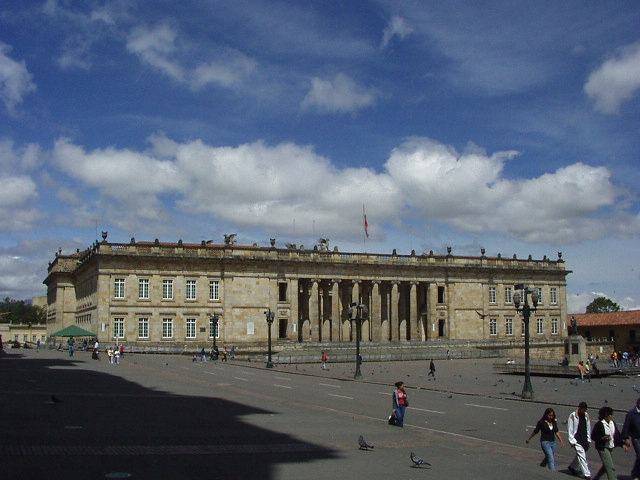
The National Capitol houses the Congress of Colombia maximum representative of the Legislative branch of government in Colombia.

The Legislative Branch of Government in Colombia is one of the three branches of the government of Colombia under the Constitutional provision of separation of powers. The legislative branch of government is represented by the Congress of Colombia, which is formed by the Senate of Colombia and the Chamber of Representatives. Both houses of Congress are further subdivided into commissions (committees) and "sub commissions" to discuss determined subjects.
