= Guilherme Da Luz =

Brazilian basketball player (born 1979)

Personal information
- Born: 11 December 1979 (age 46) Porto Alegre, Brazil
- Listed height: 6 ft 3 in (1.91 m)
- Listed weight: 208 lb (94 kg)

Career information
- College: Furman (1999–2003)
- NBA draft: 2003: undrafted
- Playing career: 2003–2004
- Position: Point guard

Career history
- 2003–2004: Viola Reggio Calabria
- 2003–2004: Scafati

Career highlights
- 2× Third-team All-SoCon (2002, 2003)

Guilherme Barros Da Luz (born 11 December 1979) is a Brazilian former professional basketball player. He played college basketball in the United States for the Furman Paladins from 1999 to 2003. Da Luz is Furman's all-time leader in assists and steals. He played professionally in Italy for two years.

== Early life ==
Da Luz is from São Paulo, Brazil, and was raised in an Italian family. He started playing basketball when he was aged 6 and played for the junior national team. Da Luz idolised Oscar Schmidt and learned to mirror his playstyle. He grew up watching the National Basketball Association (NBA) on television and dreamt about playing basketball in the United States. Da Luz graduated from high school in 1996. He played for the national team and his club team for the following three years. He attended a college in Brazil for a year but it did not affect his American collegiate eligibility because Brazilian colleges did not have teams.

== College career ==
Da Luz joined the Furman Paladins as a late addition to their 1999 recruiting class. He was also recruited by Auburn, Indiana State and New Mexico but chose Furman due to the isolation of its campus which meant he could not "do anything else ... but study and play basketball." Da Luz entered Furman's starting line-up as a freshman.

Da Luz was known for his emotional approach to playing. He stated, "I've always been emotional, because I love to play basketball." Head coach Larry Davis called his emotion "his biggest strength, and ... his worst enemy sometimes" and described him as "a very fiery and emotional young man." His teammate Marcus Dilligard observed, "He'll come out here and start shooting layups and start screaming for no reason, just yelling and running around crazy." Da Luz began to practice meditation during his junior season in 2001–02 which he credited for developing better control of his emotions.

Da Luz is Furman's career assists and steals leader. He was selected to the All-Southern Conference (SoCon) third-team in 2002 and 2003.

== Professional career ==
On 10 August 2003, Da Luz signed with Viola Reggio Calabria. He also played for Scafati during the 2003–04 season. Da Luz returned to Viola Reggio Calabria for the 2004–05 season.

== National team career ==
Da Luz played for the Brazilian under-22 national team in 2000.
