= Guilhermina Marçal =

East Timorese humanitarian activist

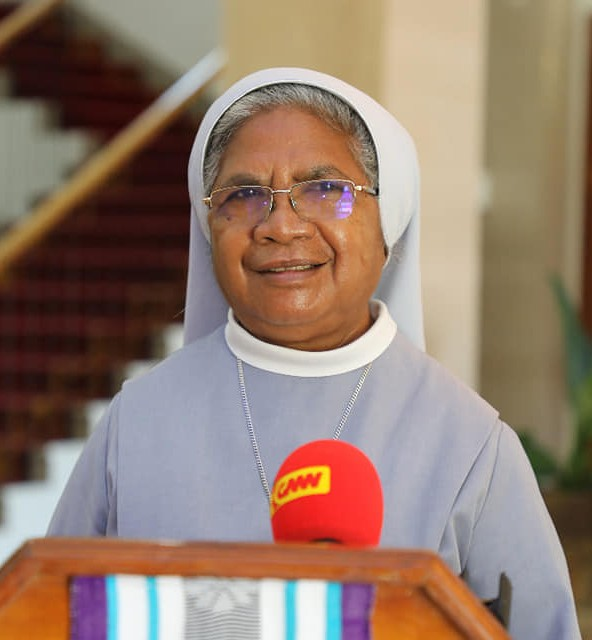
Guilhermina Marçal (2022)

Guilhermina Marçal (also known as Sister Guilhermina) is a humanitarian activist from Same, East Timor. She is the Provincial superior of the Canossian Sisters in East Timor. She was active in support for East Timor independence and would smuggle messages into prisoners. She was appointed, in 2010, to the Commission for the National Police of East Timor Promotion by the East Timor State Secretary for the Council of Ministers, Isabel da Costa Ferreira.

== Biography ==
Guilhermina Marçal is a Roman Catholic Canossian sister. She was born in Same (East Timor) and has been working for the promotion of independence, as well as social, economic and cultural rights in that country. When the first President of East Timor, Xanana Gusmão, was in prison during the struggle for independence, he was visited by Marçal. Marçal would smuggle messages in and also smuggle replies out to Falintil supporters.

The Catholic Church in East Timor has been at the heart of the humanitarian operations in the wake of the country's political crises and ethnic violence. Sister Guilhermina's story of bravery and outstanding service to the people is one of many.

When people fled violence, looting and arson attacks between April and June 2006, they sought shelter in a convent run by the Canossian Sisters. More than 8,000 people were formally registered at the site, but convent head Sister Guilhermina Marcal said the number swelled to up to 13,000 at night. She administered the supply of food provided by the World Food Programme.

Sister Guilhermina visited New Zealand to brief NZ Parliamentarians in 2007 telling them that Security was still the most pressing problem for Timor-Leste. She and other convent nuns ran the camp by themselves for the first four months. Sister Guilhermina said the convent camp had problems with malaria, dengue fever, and diarrhea. She also said 1 in 7 of the IDP's in her camp had HIV or AIDS.

As of 2011, Sister Guilhermina serves on the Counsel of Ministers of the National University of East Timor as a representative of the religious community.

== See also ==
- Catholic Church in East Timor
