= Guilherme Piai =

Brazilian politician (born 1990)

- Piai in 2023

Member of the Chamber of Deputies
- Incumbent
- Assumed office 1 February 2027
- Constituency: São Paulo

Personal details
- Born: 28 March 1990 (age 36)
- Party: Republicans

Guilherme Piai Silva Filizzola (born 28 March 1990) is a Brazilian politician who was elected member of the Chamber of Deputies in 2026. From 2023 to 2025, he served as secretary of agriculture and supply of São Paulo.
