= Wilhelmina Seegmiller =

Canadian-born American author, illustrator, and art teacher (1866–1913)

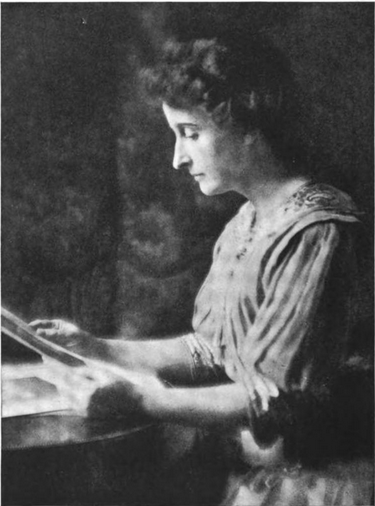
Wilhelmina Seegmiller

Wilhelmina Seegmiller (December 6, 1866 – May 24, 1913) was a Canadian-born American author, illustrator, and art teacher, recognized as an international education leader. She served as Director of Art Education in the public schools of Indianapolis, Indiana. She was credited for placing the art work in the public schools of Indianapolis on an equal level with any in the United States. Her work was such as to attract attention through the country. Walter Sargent, head of the art department of the University of Chicago, noted that Seegmiller's methods directly affected the lives of thousands of people.

== Biography ==
Wilhelmina Seegmiller was born at Fairview, Canada West on December 6, 1866.

She received her early training in the Goderich, Ontario, schools; later she studied in Toronto.

In 1884, she moved to Grand Rapids, Michigan, where she passed the teachers’ examination, and at the age of eighteen, was appointed a teacher in the primary grade at the Wealthy Avenue school, where she gave such efficient service that later she was appointed principal of the school. During the time she was teaching, she was studying art. Her work attracted the attention of educators, and she was appointed in 1888, Supervisor of Drawing in the public schools at Allegheny, Pennsylvania, a position she held until 1892.

In 1893, she entered Pratt Institute in Brooklyn, New York City, studying normal art, and immediately after her graduation, went to Europe for a short period, and then came to Indianapolis in the year 1895 as director of art instruction in the public schools, which position she held until her death in 1913.

In her time, she was the foremost teacher of art for children in the U.S. Her influence spread to Europe through her published work. Her work in the schools of Indianapolis was in a certain sense revolutionary. She introduced into the drawing work of children formerly a mere matter of uninteresting line drawing, the use of color. Under her inspiration, the children were led to attempt to make their crude sketches beautiful, as well as expressive. In this kind of work, Seegmiller was a pioneer.

Seegmiller was one of the strongest factors in the development of the John Herron Art Institute.

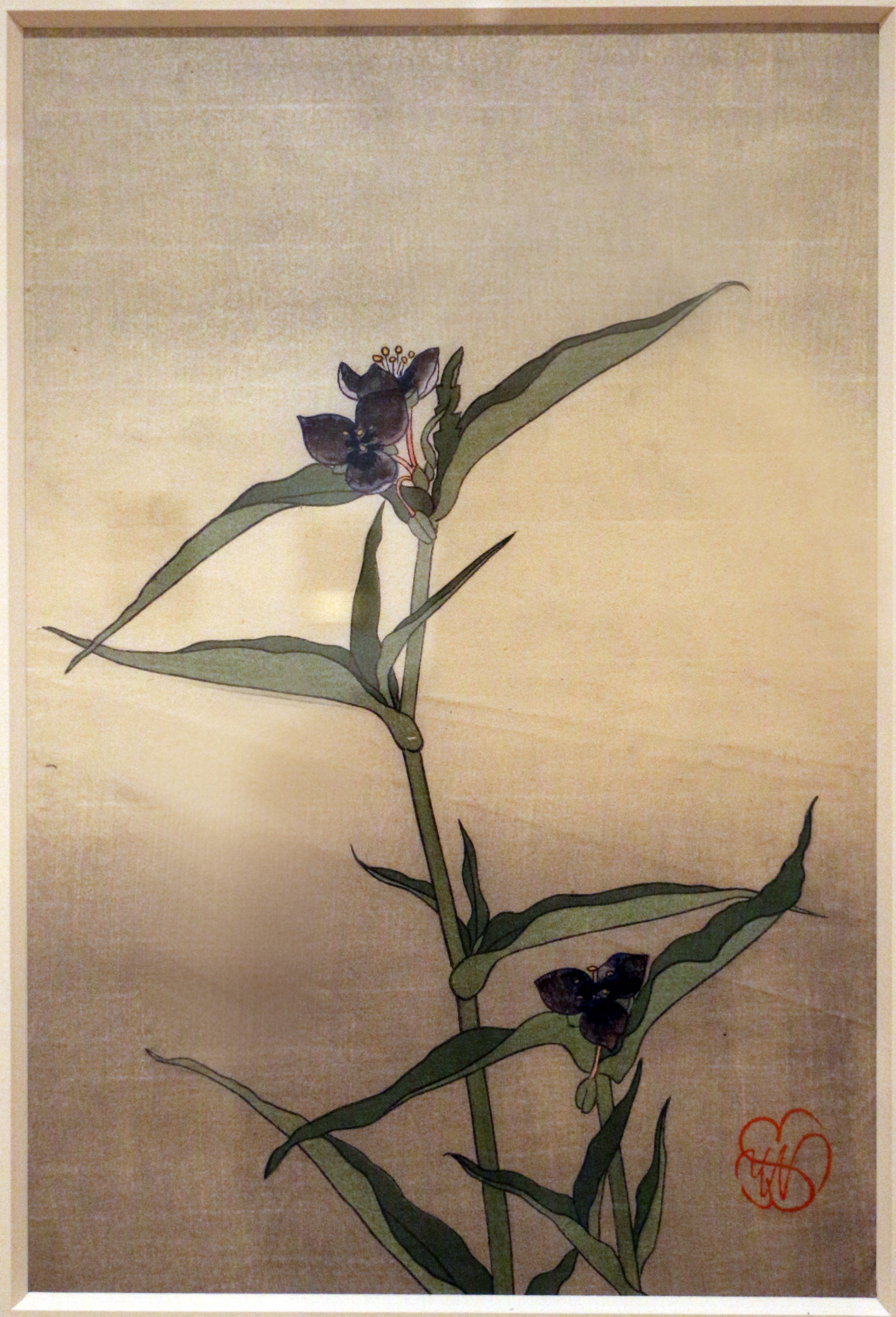
Seegmiller print, "Tradescantia", ca. 1908, in the Indianapolis Museum of Art.

A writer and lecturer on art educational topics, she was the author of The Applied Arts Drawing Books, which were universally used through the schools of the U.S. From June until January in 1914, more than a million copies were sold. In addition she was the author of Little Rhymes for Little Readers, Other Rhymes for Little Readers, and Sing a Song of Seasons. the illustrations for the last were her own, and combined accurate botanical drawing as well as a decorative sense.

She originated and arranged much material for school work: a four years' course in primary hand work; a succeeding course for the higher grades. She devised weaving mats of rough paper and soft colors; she also discovered tilo, a Japanese wood-shaving that is used in weaving mats and in basket-making; she introduced into the schools wood-block printing, stenciling, and other methods of making designs for beautifying materials used in the home. She was untiring in her efforts to broaden the outlook of the teachers with whom she worked; she gave of her time and strength to lead classes for teachers after school hours and on Saturdays, that they might better understand the principles and have a foundation upon which to build the work of art instruction.

Her interest in beautifying the school-room and the children's work took the form of appealing to and fastening the child's sense of beauty. Under her inspiration there was an attempt to make the sketches of the children, however crude, demonstrate in a practical way that they could be beautiful and expressive. In this, she worked alone for a period of time.

She was invited to represent the United States at the Third International Congress for the Advancement of Drawing and Art Teaching which was held in London, in August, 1908. It was impossible for her to attend on account of the publishing of her books at that time. The organizers were loath to accept her refusal, and a second and more urgent invitation and appeal was sent, begging her to come. There were only four persons in the U.S. to whom this invitation was extended, which speaks to the rank of her international reputation.

Seegmiller's philosophy included the thought that "art is not for the elect only, but is a verity for the great mass of people". With this idea in mind, she set about to create a greater use of the local museum by the teachers and children. The Art Association of Indianapolis appreciated the possibility of a larger field of usefulness from such cooperation, and in 1908, appointed a public school committee—Wilhelmina Seegmiller, chairman, Georgia Alexander, Louis Bacon, Calvin N. Kendall, and Mary Nicholson—with the expectation of enlarging the institution's value to the community by admitting free to the museum the teachers and pupils of the schools of the city; by providing weekly illustrated lectures; by providing the art teachers instruction in drawing and design at reduced rates; and by permitting fifty advanced pupils in drawing free instruction in the art school. This work has grown steadily since its inception until thousands of children became constant visitors, and the John Herron Art Institute became not only a storehouse of art, but an institution of democracy supplemental to the work of the public school, forming the first illustration in the U.S. of the accomplishment of cooperation between schools and the larger use of the museum. To the attainment of this purpose, Seegmiller gave her thought and time.

She died at St. Vincent Indianapolis Hospital, May 24, 1913, following an operation for appendicitis. Subsequently, the Indianapolis School Board established the Wilhelmina Seegmiller Memorial Scholarship fund which supported art teachers.

== Selected works ==
- Suggestions in hand work, 1904
- Primary hand work : a graded course for the first four years, 1906
- A hand clasp, 1911
- The Applied Arts Drawing Books
- Little Rhymes for Little Readers, 1910
- Other Rhymes for Little Readers
- Sing a Song of Seasons, c. 1914

== Gallery ==
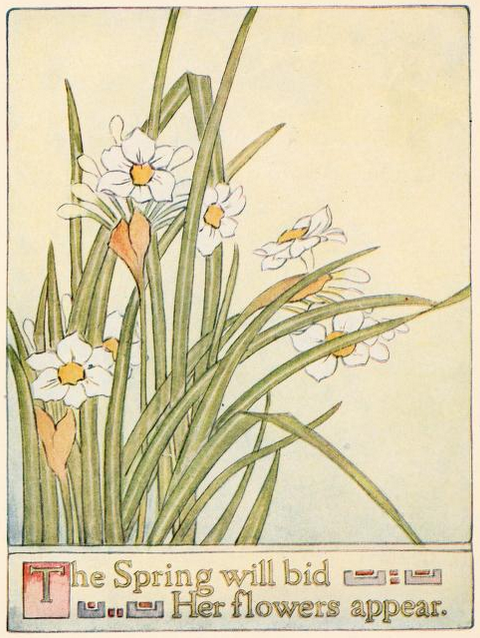
"Sing a song of seasons", p. 12

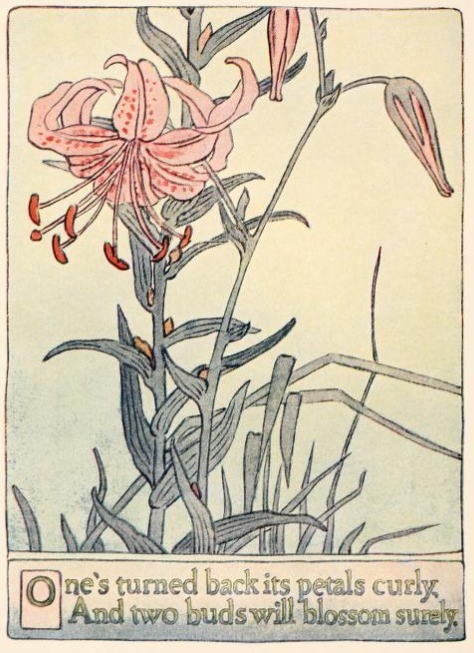
"Sing a song of seasons", p. 30

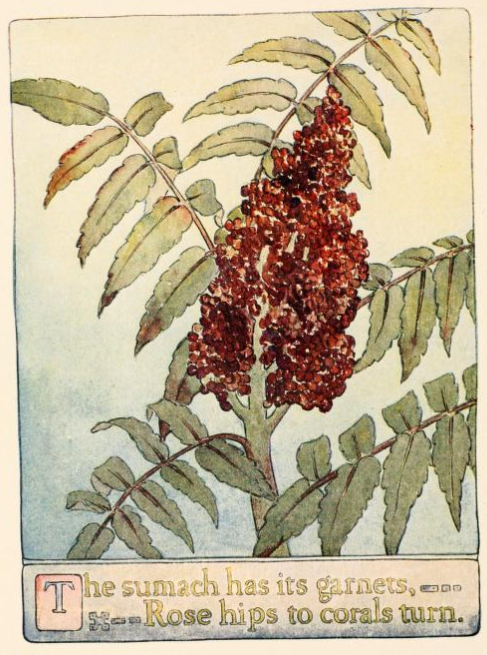
"Sing a song of seasons", p. 52

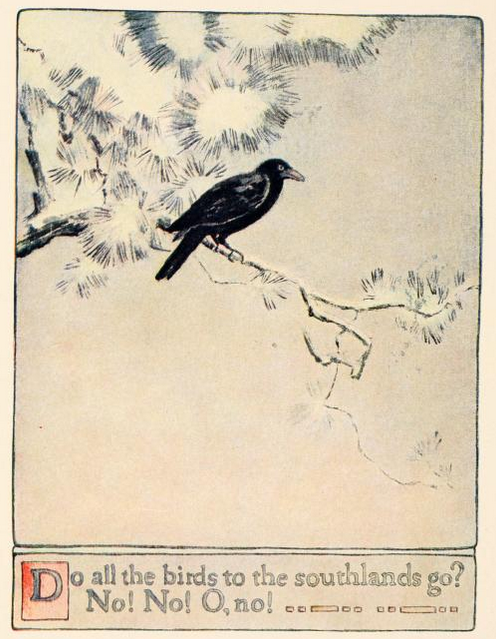
"Sing a song of seasons", p. 70
