= Princess Wilhelmine of Denmark =

Princess Wilhelmine of Denmark may refer to:

- Princess Wilhelmina Ernestine of Denmark (1650–1706), daughter of Frederick III of Denmark and wife of Charles II, Elector Palatine
- Princess Wilhelmina Caroline of Denmark and Norway (1747–1820), Frederick V of Denmark's daughter; William I, Elector of Hesse's wife
- Vilhelmine Marie of Denmark (1808–1891), daughter of Frederick VI of Denmark and wife of Frederick VII of Denmark
