= Wilma (given name) =

Wilma is a female given name, a feminine form of William. People with the name include:

== People ==
- Wilma Arizapana (born 1982), Peruvian long-distance runner
- Wilma van den Berg (born 1947), Dutch sprinter
- Wilma M. Blom, marine scientist
- Wilma Burgess (1939–2003), American singer
- Wilma Chan (1949–2021), American politician
- Wilma Lee Cooper (1921–2011), American singer
- Wilma Cosmé (born 1966), Puerto Rican singer known as Sa-Fire
- Wilma De Angelis (1930–2026), Italian singer and TV presenter
- Wilma Dressel (born 1983), German rower
- Wilma Driessen (born 1938), Dutch opera singer
- Wilma Dykeman (1920–2006), American writer
- Wilma Elles (born 1986), German actress
- Wilma de Faria, Brazilian politician, governor of Rio Grande do Norte
- Wilma Anderson Gilman (1881–1971), American concert pianist, music teacher, clubwoman
- Wilma Goich (born 1945), Italian pop singer and television personality
- Wilma Scott Heide (1921–1985), American feminist author and social activist
- Wilma van Hofwegen (born 1971), Dutch swimmer
- Wilma Labate (born 1949), Italian film director and screenwriter.
- Wilma Landkroon (born 1957), Dutch pop singer
- Wilma B. Liebman (born 1950), American lawyer
- Wilma Lipp (1925–2019), Austrian operatic soprano
- Wilma Mankiller (1945–2010), American politician and first female Cherokee chief
- Wilma Mansveld (born 1962), Dutch Minister for the Environment
- Wilma McCann (????–1975), the first victim of British serial killer Peter Sutcliffe
- Wilma Montesi (1932–1953), Italian model and murder victim
- Wilma Murto (born 1998), Finnish pole vaulter
- Wilma Neruda (1838–1911), Czech violinist
- Wilma Newhoudt-Druchen, South African politician
- Wilma Pastrana (born 1970), Puerto Rican first lady
- Wilma Rosbach (1921–2018), American politician
- Wilma Rudolph (1940–1994), American sprinter
- Wilma Rusman (born 1958), Dutch long-distance runner
- Wilma Salas (born 1991), Cuban volleyball player
- Wilma Josefina Salgado (born 1952), Ecuadorian politician and economist
- Wilma M. Sherrill (1939–2025), American politician
- Wilma Smith (born 1946), American newscaster
- Wilma Smith (born 1956), Fijian-born violinist
- Wilma Stockenström (born 1933), South Africa-born Afrikaans writer, translator, and actor
- Wilma Subra (born 1943), American environmental scientist
- Wilma Tatzel (1920–1992), Austrian actress
- Wilma Tisch (1927–2026), American socialite and heiress
- Wilma Vaught (born 1930), US Air Force brigadier general
- Wilma van Velsen (born 1964), Dutch swimmer
- Wilma Victor (1919–1987), American educator of Choctaw Indian descent
- Wilma Webb (born 1944), American politician

== Fictional characters ==
- Wilma Deering, in the television series Buck Rogers in the 25th Century
- Wilma Flintstone, in the animated television series The Flintstones
- Wilma Tenderfoot, titular character of a children's book series by Emma Kennedy

== See also ==
- Wilma (disambiguation)
