= List of people with surname Wilson =

Wilson is a common English-language surname.

== Notable individuals with the surname "Wilson" include ==
=== A ===
- Aarik Wilson (born 1982), American long jumper and triple jumper
- Abbey Wilson (born 2006), Australian snowboarder
- Abe Wilson (1899–1981), American footballer
- A. D. Wilson (1844–1920), American cartographer
- Addie Anderson Wilson (1876–1966) American composer, organist and carillonist
- Adine Wilson (born 1979), New Zealand international netball player
- A'ja Wilson (born 1996), American basketball player
- Ajee' Wilson (born 1994), American middle-distance runner
- Alastair Wilson (born 1983), British field hockey player
- Alda Wilson (1910–1996), Canadian sprinter
- Alda Heaton Wilson (1873–1960), American architect and civil engineer
- Alexandra Wilson (born 1968), American actress
- Alice Wilson (1881–1964), Canadian geologist and paleontologist
- Alistair Wilson (1939–2023), British sprint canoeist
- Allene Wilson (1896–1986), American civic leader
- Alpheus Waters Wilson (1834–1916), American bishop
- Alyson Wilson (born 1967), American statistician
- Amanda Wilson (born 1980), British singer
- Amir Wilson (born 2004), British actor
- A. N. Wilson (born 1950), English writer and newspaper columnist
- Angela K. Wilson, American chemist
- Angus Wilson (1913–1991), British author
- Anima Wilson, Ghanaian politician
- Anita Wilson (born 1976), American gospel singer-songwriter and producer
- Ann Wilson (born 1950), lead singer for American rock band Heart, sister of Nancy Wilson
- Ann-Marie Wilson, British psychologist and FGM activist
- Anthony H. Wilson (1950–2007), record label owner, nicknamed "Mr Manchester"
- Antonia Joy Wilson, American conductor
- Antonio Wilson (born 1977), American footballer
- Ara Wilson, American academic and author
- Archdale Wilson (1803–1874), British Indian Army soldier
- Atoy Wilson (born 1951/52), American figure skater
- August Wilson (1945–2005), American playwright
- Augusta Wilson (1835–1909), American author and Confederate supporter
- Austin Wilson (born 1992), American basketball player
- Avery Wilson (born 1995), American singer-songwriter and dancer
- Ayse Wilson, Turkish-American artist

=== B ===
- B. A. Wilson (born 1971), American NASCAR driver
- Barney Wilson (1912–1999), American basketball coach
- Barrie Wilson (born 1940), Canadian writer, historian and theologian
- Bart Wilson, American experimental economist
- Bee Wilson (born 1974), British food writer and historian
- Behn Wilson (born 1958), Canadian ice hockey player
- Bernice Wilson (born 1984), British track and field athlete
- Bertha Wilson (1923–2007), Canadian jurist
- Bertha M. Wilson (1874–1936), American dramatist, critic, actress
- Bertram Martin Wilson (1896–1935), English mathematician
- Beth Wilson, Australian public servant
- Betty Wilson (1921–2010), Australian cricketer
- Betty Wilson (New Jersey politician) (born 1932), American politician
- Bev Wilson (born 1949), Australian cricketer
- Big Daddy Wilson (born 1960), American singer-songwriter
- B. J. Wilson (1947–1990), British rock drummer (Procol Harum)
- Blaine Wilson (born 1974), American Olympic gymnast
- Blair Wilson (born 1963), Canadian politician
- Blake S. Wilson (born 1948), American research scientist
- Blayne Wilson (born 1992), Australian rules footballer
- Blythe Wilson, Canadian stage actress
- Bobo Wilson (born 1995), American football player
- Boyd Wilson (born 1959), Australian singer-songwriter, musician and producer
- Bracebridge Wilson (1828–1895), naturalist, headmaster in Geelong, Australia
- Braden Wilson (born 1989), American footballer
- Bradley Wilson (freestyle skier) (born 1992), American skier
- Brenard Wilson (born 1955), American football player
- Brenda Wilson, Australian politician
- Brett Michael Wilson (born 1988), American actor and musician
- Brian Wilson (1942–2025), American musician, singer, songwriter, and record producer
- Bridgette Wilson (born 1973), American actress and model
- Brooks Wilson (born 1996), American baseball player
- Bryan R. Wilson (1926–2004), English sociologist
- Bryce Wilson (born 1972), Jamaican record producer
- Bryon Wilson (born 1988), American Olympic skier
- Bryse Wilson (born 1997), American baseball player
- Bubba Wilson (born 1955), American basketball player
- Budge Wilson (1927–2021), Canadian author
- Burt Wilson (1933–2021), American philosopher
- Butch Wilson (1941–2026), American footballer
- Butler R. Wilson (1861–1939), Boston civil rights activist

=== C ===
- Cairine Wilson (1885–1962), Canadian politician
- Cal Wilson (1970–2023), New Zealand comedian and radio and TV personality
- Caleb Wilson (American football) (born 1996), American football player
- Camille Wilson (born 1995), American-born Filipino international footballer
- Campbell Wilson (born 1971), New Zealand airline executive
- C. Anne Wilson (1927–2023), British food historian
- Carin Wilson (born 1945), New Zealand sculptor
- Carly Wilson (born 1982), Australian basketball player
- Carnie Wilson (born 1968), American singer and television host
- Carolyn Wilson (born 1959), British synchronised swimmer
- Casey Wilson (born 1980), American actress, comedian and screenwriter
- Cassandra Wilson (1955–2026), American jazz musician, singer-songwriter and producer
- Catherine Wilson (1822–1862), British; convicted murderer
- Catherine Stubblefield Wilson (born 1939), American child pornography distributor
- Chandra Wilson (born 1969), American actress
- Che Wilson (born 1979), English footballer
- Cheryl Wilson, American session singer
- Chesley Goseyun Wilson (1932–2021), American maker and player of the Apache fiddle
- Chip Wilson (born 1956), Canadian businessman
- Cindy Wilson (born 1957), American singer-songwriter (B-52s)
- Cintra Wilson (born 1967), American writer, performer and cultural critic
- Claggett Wilson (1887–1952), American painter
- Claude Melnot Wilson (1898–1918), British soldier
- Clay Wilson (born 1983), American ice hockey player
- Cliff Wilson (1934–1994), Welsh snooker player
- Clive Wilson (born 1961), English footballer
- Cody Wilson (born 1988), American political activist
- Constance K. Wilson (born 1959), American politician
- Corey Wilson (born 1985), American soldier and politician
- Cornelius Wilson (born 1952), Costa Rican bishop
- Cornell A. Wilson, Jr., US Marine Corps major general
- Corri Wilson (born 1965), Scottish politician
- Cosmo Wilson (born 1961), American concert lighting designer and director
- C. T. Wilson (born 1972), American politician
- Cully Wilson (1892–1962), Canadian ice hockey player

=== D ===
- Damian Wilson (born 1969), English prog rock singer
- Damien Wilson (born 1993), American football player
- Damon Wilson (born 1973), American foreign policy advisor
- Damon Wilson (American football), American football coach
- Damon Wilson II, American football player
- Dany Wilson (1982–2011), Jamaican beach volleyball and volleyball player
- Darleen Wilson, American folk musician and record producer
- Darnell Wilson (middleweight boxer) (born 1966), American boxer
- Darnell Wilson (born 1974), American boxer
- Darrell Wilson (born 1958), American football coach
- Darroll Wilson (born 1966), American boxer
- Davie Wilson (1937–2022), Scottish footballer
- Dean Wilson (golfer) (born 1969), American golfer
- Debbie Wilson (cricketer) (born 1961), Australian cricketer
- Deborah Wilson (born 1955), American diver
- Debra Wilson (born 1962), American actress and comedian
- Dede Wilson (born 1937), American poet and writer
- Demetrius Wilson (born 1990/91), American footballer
- Demond Wilson (1946–2026), American actor, author and pastor
- Denis Wilson (footballer) (born 1936), English footballer
- Dennis Wilson (racing driver) (born 1952), American racing driver
- De'Runnya Wilson (1994–2020), American football player
- Des Wilson (born 1941), New Zealand born British activist, sports administrator, author and poker player
- Desi Wilson (born 1969), American baseball player and coach
- Desiré Wilson (born 1953), South African racing driver
- D. Harlan Wilson (born 1971), American short-story writer, literary critic, editor and novelist
- Diane Wilson, American environmental campaigner and author
- Diarmuid Wilson (born 1965), Irish politician
- Divaad Wilson (born 2000), American football player
- Dolores Wilson (1928–2010), American opera singer and musical theatre actress
- Dolores Wilson (baseball) (1928–2022), American baseball player
- Donegal Wilson, Canadian politician
- Donna Wilson, American educational and school psychologist
- Dooley Wilson (1886–1953), American actor and singer
- Dorian Wilson (born 1964), American conductor and musical director
- Doric Wilson (1939–2011), American playwright, director and producer
- Dorien Wilson (born 1963), American actor
- Dougal Wilson (born 1971), English director of commercials and music videos
- Dougie Wilson (born 1994), Northern Irish footballer
- Drusilla Wilson (1815–1908), American temperance leader and Quaker pastor
- Duane Wilson (1934–2021), American baseball player
- Duane Wilson (American football), American football coach
- Duff Wilson, American investigative reporter
- Dunc Wilson (1948–2023), Canadian ice hockey player
- D. W. Wilson (born 1985), Canadian author

=== E ===
- Earnest Wilson (born 1965), American football coach
- Effingham Wilson (1785–1868), English radical publisher and bookseller
- Eileen Wilson (1923–2018), American television star
- E. J. Wilson (born 1987), American footballer
- Eleanor Wilson McAdoo (1889–1967), third daughter of Woodrow Wilson
- Elder Roma Wilson (1910–2018), American gospel harmonica player and singer
- Elinor Wilson, Canadian civil servant, President of Assisted Human Reproduction Canada
- Ella B. Ensor Wilson (1838–1913), American social reformer and writer
- Elliot Wilson (born 1979), English cricketer
- Ellis Wilson (1899–1977), American artist
- Emma Wilson (born 1967), British academic and writer
- Emma Wilson (sailor) (born 1999), British sailor
- Emma-Jayne Wilson (born 1981), Canadian jockey
- Emperatriz Wilson (born 1966), Cuban long-distance runner
- Enrique Wilson (born 1973), Dominican baseball player
- E. O. Wilson (1929–2021), American biologist and author
- Erica Wilson (1928–2011), English–born American embroidery designer
- Erin Cressida Wilson (born 1964), American playwright, screenwriter and author
- Erv Wilson (1928–2016), Mexican/American music theorist
- Ethel Wilson (1888–1980), Canadian writer
- Ethel Sylvia Wilson (1902–1983), Canadian seamstress and politician

=== F ===
- Fergal Wilson (born 1979), Irish Gaelic footballer
- Fiammetta Wilson (1864–1920), British astronomer
- Flip Wilson (1933–1998), American comedian and actor
- Flo Wilson (born 1963), English actress
- F. Paul Wilson (born 1946), American author
- Frae Wilson (born 1989), New Zealand rugby union footballer
- Fran Wilson (born 1991), English cricketer
- Franklyn Wilson (born 1947), Bahamian businessman and politician
- Frederica Wilson (born 1942), American politician
- Freya Wilson (born 1999), British actress

=== G ===
- Gahan Wilson (1930–2019), American author and cartoonist
- Garrett Wilson (born 2000), American football wide receiver
- Garrett Wilson (ice hockey) (born 1991), Canadian professional ice hockey winger
- Gayle Wilson (born 1942), American businesswoman and socialite
- Gene Wilson (American football) (1926–2002), American football player
- Georges Wilson (1921–2010), French film and TV actor
- Georgina Wilson (born 1986), Filipina-British model
- Gerry Wilson (ice hockey) (1937–2011), Canadian ice hockey forward
- Gertrude Wilson (1888–1968), American composer and pianist
- Gibril Wilson (born 1981), Sierra Leonean-born American footballer
- Gillis Wilson (born 1977), American football player
- Gill Robb Wilson (1892–1966), American; founder of the U.S. Civil Air Patrol
- Gina Wilson (born 1952), Australian intersex activist
- Giuseppe Wilson (1945–2022), English-born Italian international footballer
- Gord Wilson (1932–2023), Canadian ice hockey player
- Grace Wilson (1879–1957), Australian nurse
- Grace Wilson (soccer) (born 2005), Australian football player
- Grant M. Wilson (1931–2012), American thermodynamicist
- Grant Wilson (born 1974), co-star/co-producer of the TV show Ghost Hunters
- Grenville Wilson (born 1932), English cricketer
- Grenville Dean Wilson (1833–1897), American pianist and composer
- Gretchen Wilson (born 1973), American country music singer
- Gus Wilson (born 1963), English football player and coach
- Gustaf Wilson (1827–1905), Finnish-American pioneer and businessman
- G. Willow Wilson (born 1982), American comics writer, author and journalist

=== H ===
- H. Abram Wilson (born 1946), American politician
- Halena Wilson (1897–1975), American activist
- Hamish Wilson (1942–2020), Scottish actor
- Hank Wilson (1947–2008), American LGBT activist
- Hannah Wilson (born 1989), Hong Kong swimmer
- Hap Wilson, Canadian naturalist, author, illustrator and photographer
- Harriet E. Wilson (1825–1900), American novelist
- Harriette Wilson (1786–1845), English courtesan
- Harrison Wilson Jr. (1925–2019), American educator and basketball coach
- Hay Wilson (??–1925), British Anglican priest
- Hayley Wilson (born 2001), Australian skateboarder
- H. Clyde Wilson Jr. (1926–2010), American professor of anthropology
- Heather Wilson (born 1960), American politician
- Heather Wilson (cyclist) (born 1982), Irish racing cyclist
- Hilda Wilson (1860–1918), British contralto and composer
- Hill H. Wilson (1840–1896), American businessman and politician
- Hobb Wilson (1904–1977), Canadian ice hockey player
- Hub Wilson (1909–1999), Canadian ice hockey player
- Hughie Wilson (1869–1940), Scottish footballer
- Huntington Wilson (1875–1946), American diplomat and author

=== I ===
- Ibbie McColm Wilson (1834–1908), American poet
- Ira Wilson (1867–1944), American dairy businessman and politician
- Isabel Wilson (1895–1982), British psychiatrist and civil servant

=== J ===
- Jacqueline Wilson (born 1945), English author
- Jake Wilson (born 1977), American politician
- Jalen Wilson (born 2000), American basketball player
- Jamar Wilson (born 1984), American basketball player
- Jamil Wilson (born 1990), American basketball player
- Jan Wilson (British politician) (1944–2010), English politician
- Jan Wilson (Australian politician) (1939–2010), Australian politician
- Jane Wilson (1924–2015), American painter
- Janet Wilson (born 1948), UK-based New Zealand academic
- J. C. Wilson (born 1956), American football player
- Jeanne Wilson (swimmer) (1926–2018), American Olympic swimmer
- Jeffrey A. Wilson, American paleontologist and professor of geological sciences
- Jennie Scott Wilson (1875–1951) American child prodigy as an elocutionist
- Jeremiah Wilson (American football) (born 2004), American football player
- Jeremy Wilson (1944–2017), British historian and writer
- Jerome L. Wilson (1931–2019), American politician
- Jeron Wilson (born 1977), American professional skateboarder
- Jessica Wilson, American philosopher
- Jessie Woodrow Wilson Sayre (1887–1933), American political activist
- Jez Wilson (born 1979), English boxer
- J. Frank Wilson (1941–1991), American singer
- J. Keith Wilson, American art curator
- Joan Dolores Wilson (born 1933), American composer and harpist
- JoAnn Wilson (1939–1983), Canadian political figure
- Joanna Wilson (born 1970), Canadian aquatic toxicologist and physiologist
- Jocky Wilson (1950–2012), Scottish darts player
- Jody Wilson-Raybould (born 1971), Canadian politician
- Jorge Wilson, Argentinian Olympic field hockey player
- Joemy Wilson, American hammered dulcimer player
- Johnnie E. Wilson (born 1944), United States Army four-star general
- Jomo Wilson (born 1983), American footballer
- José Wilson (born 1931), Brazilian modern pentathlete
- Joyce Vincent Wilson (born 1946), American singer
- J. S. Wilson (1888–1969), Scottish soldier and scouting notable
- Juanita Wilson, Irish film director and writer
- Jud Wilson (1894–1963), American baseball player and manager
- Ju Ju Wilson, Australian artist
- Julia Wilson (born 1978), Australian Olympic rower
- Julie Wilson (1924–2015), American singer and actress
- Julius Wilson (born 1983), American football player
- Jurgen Wilson (1836–1897), German-American army officer

=== K ===
- Kaia Wilson (born 1974), American musician
- Kandace Wilson (born 1984), American soccer player
- Kara Wilson (born 1944), Scottish actress
- Karl Wilson (born 1964), American football player
- Kathleen Wilson (1911–2005), American actress
- Kay Wilson (rugby union) (born 1991), English rugby union player
- Kelsey Wilson (born 1986), Canadian ice hockey player
- Kelvin Wilson (born 1985), English footballer
- Keri-Lynn Wilson (born 1967), Canadian conductor
- Kerrie Wilson, Australian environmental scientist
- Kerry-Jayne Wilson, late 20th/early 21st century New Zealand biologist and professor
- Kim Wilson (born 1951), American blues singer and harmonica player
- Kinsey Wilson (born 1955), American journalist
- Kion Wilson (born 1986), American football linebacker
- Kirby Wilson (born 1961), American football coach
- Kirk Wilson (born 1977), American soccer player
- Khyra Wilson, British singer known professionally as Kwn
- Kortney Wilson (born 1979), Canadian country music singer
- Kristen Wilson (born 1969), American actress
- Kristian Wilson (cricketer) (born 1982), English cricketer
- Kym Wilson (born 1973), Australian actress and TV host
- Kyren Wilson (born 1991), English snooker player

=== L ===
- Lainey Wilson, American singer
- Lamarr Wilson (1977–2025), American YouTuber
- Lamayn Wilson (born 1980), American basketball player
- Lambert Wilson (born 1958), French actor
- Landon Wilson (born 1975), American ice hockey player
- Lanford Wilson (1937–2011), American playwright
- Larissa Wilson (born 1989), English actress
- Laurence Wilson (born 1986), English footballer
- Lawrence Wilson (born 1987), American footballer
- Leanne Wilson (born 1980), British actress
- Leigh Allison Wilson (born 1957), American novelist
- Leonard Wilson (1897–1970), Singaporean bishop
- Leonard Gilchrist Wilson (1928–2018), Canadian-American historian of medicine and science
- Lester Wilson (1942–1993), American dancer, choreographer and actor
- Lexi Wilson (born 1991), Bahamian beauty queen and model
- Liam Wilson (born 1979), American bass player
- Linda S. Wilson (born 1936), American academic administrator
- Lindy Wilson, South African politician
- Linetta Wilson (born 1967), American Olympic sprinter
- Logan Wilson (born 1996), American football player
- Lori Wilson (Florida politician) (1937–2019), American politician
- Louise Wilson (1962–2014), British professor of fashion design
- Luis Wilson (born 1962), Peruvian politician
- Luisa Wilson (born 2005), Mexican-Canadian ice hockey player
- Luke Wilson (born 1971), American actor
- Lulu Wilson (born 2005), American actress
- Lydia Wilson (born 1984), Anglo-American actress and radio personality
- Lynda Wilson (born 1960), American politician
- Lynton Wilson (born 1940), Canadian business executive

=== M ===
- Mack Wilson (born 1998), American football player
- Macel Wilson (born 1943), American model
- Maia Wilson (born 1997), New Zealand netball player
- Mak Wilson (born 1957), English puppeteer
- Manumaua Wayne C. Wilson, American Samoan politician
- Mara Wilson (born 1987), American actress
- Margo Wilson (1942–2009), Canadian psychologist
- Marguerite Wilson (1918–1972), English cyclist
- Mari Wilson (born 1954), British singer
- Marian Robertson Wilson (1926–2013), American cellist, linguist and teacher
- Marilyn Wilson (swimmer) (born 1943), Australian Olympic swimmer
- Mário Wilson (1929–2016), Mozambican football player and manager
- Marius Wilson, Saint Lucian politician
- Marjorie Wilson (born 1951), English geologist and petrologist
- Marquess Wilson (born 1992), American footballer
- Marquise Wilson, American actor
- Martez Wilson (born 1988), American footballer
- Martha Loftin Wilson (1834–1919), American missionary worker
- Martha Wilson (born 1947), American performance artist
- Matilda Ellen Wilson (1860–1918), British contralto and composer
- Maurice Wilson (1898–1934), British soldier, mystic, mountaineer and aviator
- Maurice Wilson (footballer), Scottish footballer
- Mavis Wilson (born c.1949), Canadian politician in Ontario
- Maxine Wilson (born 1946), American-born Canadian politician
- Megan Wilson (born 1969), American visual artist
- Mel Wilson (1917–2007), Canadian football player
- Meri Wilson (1949–2002), American pop music singer
- Mervyn Wilson (1922–2022), Irish Anglican priest
- Micaela Wilson (born 1992), Australian netball player
- Millard K. Wilson (1890–1933), American actor
- Millie Wilson (born 1948), American artist
- Mitch Wilson (1962–2019), Canadian ice hockey player
- Mitch Wilson (rugby union) (born 1996), Australian-born American rugby union player
- Mitchell A. Wilson (1914–1973), American novelist and physicist
- Monique Wilson (councilwoman), Saban councilwoman
- Mookie Wilson (born 1956), American baseball player
- Morland Wilson, Jamaican politician
- Morley E. Wilson (1881–1965), Canadian geologist
- M. Roy Wilson (born 1953), American academic administrator
- Munira Wilson (born 1978), British politician
- Murray Wilson (born 1951), Canadian ice hockey player
- Murry Wilson (1917–1973), father of Brian, Dennis and Carl Wilson of The Beach Boys
- Mutt Wilson (1896–1962), American baseball player
- Myra Wilson, British computer scientist

=== N ===
- Nadine Wilson, Canadian politician
- Nairn Wilson (born 1950), British dentist
- Naomi Wilson (born 1940), Australian politician
- Natalie Wilson (born 1975), American gospel musician and artist
- Nathaniel S. Wilson (born 1947), American master sailmaker, rigger and sail designer
- N. D. Wilson (born 1978), American author
- Neal C. Wilson (1920–2010), American religious figure
- Nemiah Wilson (born 1943), American footballer
- Niamh Wilson (born 1997), Canadian actress
- Nickiesha Wilson (born 1986), Jamaican Olympic hurdler
- Nicola Wilson (born 1969), Canadian-born, Dutch and New Zealand international cricketer
- Nicola Wilson (born 1976), British equestrian rider
- Nikita Wilson (born 1964), American basketball player
- Nikki Wilson, British television producer
- Nile Wilson (born 1996), British artistic gymnast
- Noel Wilson (born 1979), Indian footballer
- Norah Wilson (1901–1971), Australian Aboriginal community worker
- Norma Wilson (1909–2000), New Zealand sprinter
- Norma Wilson (cricketer) (1929–2022), Australian cricketer
- Norries Wilson, American football coach
- Norro Wilson (1938–2017), American singer-songwriter

=== O ===
- Oliver Wilson (born 1980), English golfer
- Olly Wilson (1937–2018), American composer
- Omar Wilson, American R&B artist
- Ontaria Wilson (born 1999), American football player
- O'Neil Wilson (born 1978), Canadian football player
- Orlando Wilson (television presenter) (born 1947), American TV fishing show presenter and angler
- Oswald Wilson (1866–1950), Australian architect
- Othell Wilson (born 1961), American basketball player
- Otis Wilson (born 1957), American football player
- O. W. Wilson (1900–1972), American police chief and writer
- Owen Wilson (born 1968), American actor

=== P ===
- P. Wilson (born 1966), Indian lawyer
- Paddy Wilson (1933–1973), Northern Ireland politician
- Pat Wilson (born 1948), Australian singer and journalist
- Patrice Wilson (born 1983), Nigerian-American music producer and singer-songwriter
- Patricia Wilson (1929–2005), novelist
- Paul Wilson (born 1971), nuclear engineer and professor
- Paulette Wilson (1956–2020), British immigration activist
- Pauline Wilson, Hawaiian jazz/pop singer
- Payton Wilson (born 2000), American football player
- Penelope Wilson, British Egyptologist
- Penny Wilson (born 1962), British windsurfer
- Perce Wilson (1890–1936), American football player
- Perry Wilson (1916–2009), American actress
- Perry William Wilson (1902–1981), American microbiologist and biochemist
- Peta Wilson (born 1970), Australian actress
- Phyllis J. Wilson, American military officer
- Pippa Wilson (born 1986), English sailor
- Precious Wilson (born 1957), Jamaican soul singer
- Preston Wilson (born 1974), American baseball player

=== Q ===
- Quatarrius Wilson (born 1996), American basketball player
- Quincy Wilson (cornerback) (born 1996), American football player
- Quincy Wilson (runner) (born 2008), American athlete
- Quincy Wilson (running back) (born 1981), American football player
- Quinn Wilson (1908–1978), American jazz bassist and tubist

=== R ===
- Rab Wilson (born 1960), Scottish poet
- Rainn Wilson (born 1966), American actor
- Ralph Wilson (1918–2014), American football executive
- Ramik Wilson (born 1992), American football player
- Ranji Wilson (1886–1953), New Zealand rugby union international
- Ransom Wilson (born 1951), American flautist and conductor
- Raylen Wilson (born 2005), American football player
- Reagan Wilson (born 1947), American model and actress
- Rebecca Wilson (1961–2016), Australian journalist, radio and TV presenter
- Rebekah Wilson (born 1991), British Olympic bobsledder
- Rebel Wilson (born 1980), Australian comedian, actress and writer
- Red Wilson (baseball) (1929–2014), American baseball player
- Reinard Wilson (born 1973), American footballer
- Renny Wilson, Canadian singer-songwriter and producer
- Reno Wilson (born 1969), American actor, comedian and voice artist
- Reuben Wilson (1935–2023), American jazz organist
- Reuben Wilson (cricketer) (born 2006), Irish cricketer
- Rex Wilson (disambiguation), several people
- Rik Wilson (1962–2016), American ice hockey player
- Risë Wilson, American community organizer
- Rita Wilson (born 1956), American actress
- River Wilson-Bent (born 1994), British boxer
- R. J. Wilson (born 1971), American politician
- R. M. Wilson (born 1945), American mathematician
- Robley Wilson (1930–2018), American poet, writer and editor
- Rod Wilson (born 1981), American football player
- Rod Wilson (politician), Canadian politician
- Roman Wilson (born 2001), American football player
- Romer Wilson (1891–1930), British novelist and biographer
- Ron Wilson (American politician) (born 1943), American politician, convicted of fraud
- Ron Wilson (artist), American comics artist
- Ron Wilson (Australian footballer) (1915–1984), Australian rules footballer
- Ron Wilson (Australian politician) (born 1958), Australian politician
- Ron Wilson (CBC radio host) (born 1958), Canadian television journalist, born 1958
- Ron Wilson (Clear Channel radio host), American talk radio host
- Ron Wilson (drummer) (1944–1989), American musician
- Ron Wilson (footballer, born 1924) (1924–2007), English footballer
- Ron Wilson (footballer, born 1941) (1941–2001), Scottish footballer
- Ron Wilson (ice hockey, born 1955), Canadian-American ice hockey coach
- Ron Wilson (ice hockey, born 1956), Canadian ice hockey player and coach
- Ron Wilson (magician) (1926–2010), Scottish-born magician
- Ron Wilson (newsreader) (born 1952), Australian television/radio presenter
- Ron Wilson (rugby union) (born 1954), Scottish rugby union player
- Ronell Wilson (born 1982), American gang leader
- Roxane Wilson (born 1965), Australian actress
- Roxanne Wilson (born 1979), American TV and radio personality
- Rufus Rockwell Wilson (1865–1949), American journalist and author

=== S ===
- Sally-Ann Wilson (born 1959), British media executive
- Sandin Wilson (born 1959), American bassist and singer
- S. Clay Wilson (1941–2021), American cartoonist
- Serena Wilson (1933–2007), American belly dancer and TV presenter
- Seretta Wilson (born 1951), British actress
- Shadow Wilson (1919–1959), American jazz drummer
- Shane Wilson (racing) (born 1968), American NASCAR crew chief
- Shane Wilson (sculptor), Canadian sculptor
- Shannon Wilson, Canadian fashion designer
- Shaun Wilson (born 1972), Australian artist and film maker
- Shaun Wilson (American football) (born 1995), American football player
- Sheddrick Wilson (born 1973), American football player
- Sheldon Wilson, Canadian film director, screenwriter and film producer
- Shelby Wilson (born 1937), American Olympic wrestler
- Sheree J. Wilson (born 1958), American actress
- Sheri-D Wilson, Canadian poet and activist
- Sherry Wilson, Canadian politician
- Shirley Wilson (1925–2021), American football coach
- Sid Wilson (born 1977), turntablist of Slipknot
- Sir Mawn Wilson (born 1973), American football player
- Skip Wilson, American college baseball coach
- Smokey Wilson (1936–2015), American blues guitarist
- Sophie Wilson (born 1957), English computer scientist
- Spanky Wilson, American soul, funk, and jazz singer
- S. S. Wilson, American screenwriter
- Staci Wilson (born 1976), American Olympic soccer player
- Stacy Wilson (born 1965), Canadian ice hockey player
- Stefan Wilson (born 1989), British racing driver
- Stephanie Wilson (born 1966), American engineer and astronaut
- Stewart Wilson (born 1942), Scottish rugby union player
- Stewart Murray Wilson (1946–2021), New Zealand sex offender
- Stu Wilson (1954–2025), New Zealand rugby union player
- Stu Wilson (American football) (1905–1963), American football player
- Sydney Wilson (born 1990), English snooker player

=== T ===
- Tack Wilson (born 1955), American baseball player
- Talei Wilson (born 1995), Fijian rugby union player
- Tammie Wilson (born 1961), American politician
- Tammy Wilson (born 1973), New Zealand rugby union player
- Tanya Wilson (born 1950), American model
- Tavon Wilson (born 1990), American football player
- Tay Wilson (1925–2014), New Zealand rower and Olympic official
- Taylor Wilson (born 1994), American nuclear scientist
- Teresa Wilson, American softball coach
- Tex Wilson (1901–1946), American baseball player
- Theo Wilson (1917–1997), American journalist
- Theodore Wilson (1943–1991), American character actor
- Theodore Percival Wilson (1819–1881), Australian priest
- Thom Wilson, American; punk rock record producer and engineer
- T. J. Wilson (boxer) (born 1975), American boxer
- Torrie Wilson (born 1975), American professional wrestler
- Toyelle Wilson (born 1981), American basketball player and coach
- Tracey Scott Wilson, American playwright and television writer
- Tracy Wilson (born 1961), Canadian ice dancer
- Tracy Wilson (American football) (born 1989), American football player
- Trey Wilson (1948–1989), American character actor
- Tyree Wilson (born 2002), American football player

=== U ===
- U.P. Wilson (1934–2004), American blues guitarist and singer
- Ulrica Wilson, American mathematician
- Ulrich Wilson (born 1964), Dutch footballer
- Uncle Billy Wilson, American miner
- Uriah Wilson (1841–1918), Canadian politician

=== V ===
- Valérie Wilson (1953–2011), French actress
- Valerie Rawlston Wilson, American economist
- Vance Wilson (born 1973), American baseball player & coach
- Vance Wilson (musician) (1925–2010), American saxophonist
- Vaughn Wilson (born 1976), American actor
- Vay Wilson (1912–1962), Australia international rugby union player
- Vern Wilson (1931–1993), Australian rules footballer
- Vern Wilson (high jumper) (1931–2016), American high jumper
- Vic Wilson (cricketer) (1921–2008), English cricketer
- Vic Wilson (racing driver) (1931–2001), British racing driver
- Victoria Wilson (publisher and writer)
- Victoria Wilson-James, singer, songwriter and record producer
- Vicki, Kelly, and Amanda Wilson, (equestrians)
- Vicki Wilson (netball) (born 1965)
- Vicki Wilson (politician)
- Vicky Riback-Wilson, American politician
- Victor Wilson (1877–1957), Australian politician
- Viola Wilson (1911–2002), Scottish singer
- Vivian Wilson (born 2004), American model and activist
- Vivian Wilson (rugby union) (1899–1978), New Zealand rugby union player

=== W ===
- W. Brett Wilson (born 1957), Canadian businessman
- W. David Wilson, Canadian businessman
- W. Eugene Wilson (1929–2015), American politician from North Carolina
- W. Hasell Wilson (1811–1902), American railroad engineer
- W. R. Wilson (c. 1849 – 1900), Australian businessman and racehorse breeder
- W. Stephen Wilson, American mathematician
- Waddell Wilson (born 1936), NASCAR mechanic and crew chief
- Wade Wilson (American football) (1959–2019), American football player and coach
- Wade Wilson (criminal) (born 1994), American murderer
- Wally Wilson (born 1947), American record producer
- Wally Wilson (ice hockey) (1921–1995), Canadian ice hockey player
- Walter Wilson (baseball) (1913–1994), American baseball player
- Walter Wilson (biographer) (c. 1781 – 1847), English biographer
- Walter Wilson (cricketer) (1843–1865), New Zealand cricketer
- Walter Wilson (footballer, born 1865), English footballer
- Walter Wilson (footballer, fl. 1894), English footballer
- Walter Wilson (gridiron football) (born 1966), American football player
- Walter Wilson (rugby union) (1885–1968), British Army officer & England rugby union player
- Walter Gordon Wilson (1874–1957), Irish mechanical engineer and inventor
- Walter Henry Wilson (1839–1904), Irish ship designer
- Walter K. Wilson Jr. (1906–1985), United States Army general
- Walter K. Wilson Sr. (1880–1954), US Army major general
- Warbler Wilson (1878–1958), American football player and city recorder
- Ward Wilson (born 1956), American nuclear disarmament researcher
- Warren B. Wilson (1920–1997), American painter
- Warren Elvin Wilson, American civil engineer and college administrator
- Warren Griffin Wilson (1934–2024), American journalist
- Warren Hugh Wilson (1867–1937), American rural sociologist
- Wattie Wilson (1879–1926), Scottish footballer
- Wayne Wilson (American football) (1957–2024), American football player
- Wayne Wilson (ice hockey) (born 1963), Canadian ice hockey player and coach
- Wayne Wilson (weightlifter) (born 1949), Canadian weightlifter
- Welcome W. Wilson Jr. (born 1951), American businessman
- Welcome W. Wilson Sr. (1928–2024), American real estate executive
- Wendy Wilson (born 1969), American pop singer
- Wes Wilson (1937–2020), American artist
- Wesley Wilson (1893–1958), American singer
- Weston Wilson (born 1994), American baseball player
- Whayne Wilson (1975–2005), Costa Rican footballer
- Whip Wilson (1911–64), American actor
- Wildcat Wilson (1901–1963), American football player
- Wilder Wilson (born 2000), Nicaraguan footballer
- Will Wilson (artist) (born 1957), American artist
- Will Wilson (baseball) (born 1998), American baseball player
- Will Wilson (photographer) (born 1969), Native American photographer
- Will Wilson (rugby union) (born 1997), English rugby union player
- Will Wilson (Texas politician) (1912–2005), American judge
- William "Amos" Wilson (1762–1821), American hermit
- William Wilson (1720–1796), British politician, MP from 1761 to 1768
- William Wilson (American academic) (born 1958), President of Oral Roberts University
- William Wilson (aquatics) (1844–1912), British journalist, swimming instructor and coach
- William Wilson (architect) (1641–1710), English architect, builder and sculptor
- William Wilson (artist) (1905–1972), British artist
- William Wilson (bishop) (1806–1888), Scottish Episcopal bishop
- William Wilson (Bombay Marine officer) (1715–1795)
- William Wilson (botanist) (1799–1871), English botanist and bryologist
- William Wilson (British Columbia politician) (1838–1922), Canadian politician
- William Wilson (canon of Windsor) (1545–1615), English Anglican priest
- William Wilson (Coventry MP) (1913–2010), British politician
- William Wilson (cricketer, born 1912), Australian cricketer
- William Wilson (dean of Cloyne), Irish Anglican cleric
- William Wilson (defender), English footballer
- William Wilson (died 1582), English politician
- William Wilson (Donegal MP) (1836–1879), Irish politician
- William Wilson (Dundee minister) (1808–1888), Scottish minister
- William Wilson (engineer) (1809–1862), British mechanical engineer
- William Wilson (English academic) (1875–1965), English physicist
- William Wilson (field hockey) (1917–1984), American hockey player
- William Wilson (footballer, born 1902), English footballer
- William Wilson (footballer, born 1915), English footballer
- William Wilson (footballer, born 1921), Scottish footballer
- William Wilson (footballer, born 2001) (born 2001), Kenyan footballer
- William Wilson (footballer, born November 1915), English footballer
- William Wilson (Illinois judge) (1794–1857), American judge
- William Wilson (Iowa politician) (1820–1900), American politician
- William Wilson (mayor) (1819–1897), New Zealand politician
- William Wilson (New Brunswick politician) (1845–1921), Canadian politician
- William Wilson (Ohio politician) (1773–1827), Ohio politician
- William Wilson (Pennsylvania politician), American politician
- William Wilson (physicist) (1887–1948), English-born physicist
- William Wilson (poet) (1801–1860), American poet
- William Wilson (Queensland politician) (1832–1903), Australian politician
- William Wilson (Secession minister) (1690–1741), Scottish Presbyterian minister
- William Wilson (soldier, born 1847) (1847–1895), US Army Medal of Honor recipient twice
- William Wilson (South African cricketer) (1925–2005), South African cricketer
- William Wilson (sportsman, born 1909) (1909–1976), Australian rules footballer
- William Wilson (swimmer) (born 1964), Filipino swimmer
- William Wilson (Upper Canada politician) (1789–1847), Upper Canada militia officer, politician, and justice of the peace
- William Wilson (Victorian politician) (1834–1891), Australian politician
- William Wilson (Westhoughton MP) (1855–1921), British trade unionist and Labour politician
- William Wilson (Wisconsin politician) (1807–1892), American politician
- William Wilson (wrestler) (1887–1955), British wrestler
- William Wilson (Zouave) (1823–1874), Union Army brevet brigadier general
- William A. Wilson (diplomat) (1914–2009), American businessman and diplomat
- William A. Wilson (folklorist) (1933–2016), American scholar of Mormon folklore
- William Adam Wilson (1928–1994), Scottish lawyer
- William B. Wilson (1862–1934), American politician
- William C. Wilson (judge) (1812–1882), American judge
- William C. Wilson (minister) (1866–1915), American Nazarene general superintendent
- William C. Wilson (New York politician) (1866–1943), American politician
- William Carus Wilson (1791–1859), English writer
- William Chisholm Wilson (1810–1876), New Zealand newspaper proprietor
- William Croft Wilson (1931–1963), American Congregationalist minister
- William Deane Wilson (1843–1921), British Army surgeon
- William E. Wilson (Indiana politician) (1870–1948), American politician
- William E. Wilson (photographer) (1853–1905), English photographer
- William E. Wilson (writer) (1906–1988), American writer
- William Edward Wilson (astronomer) (1851–1908), Irish astronomer
- William George Wilson (1917–2007), American cinematographer
- William H. Wilson (1877–1937), American politician
- William H. Wilson (New York politician) (c. 1873 – 1901), American politician
- William Hardy Wilson (1881–1955), Australian architect
- William Hawkins Wilson (1866–1956), British physiologist
- William J. Wilson (1874–1936), Scottish theatre director
- William James Erasmus Wilson (1809–1884), British surgeon
- William Julius Wilson (born 1935), American sociologist
- William K. Wilson (c. 1817 – 1898), American politician
- William L. Wilson (nanoscientist), American nanoscientist
- William Llewellyn Wilson (1887–1950), American conductor
- William Lyall Wilson (1866–1914), Scottish Presbyterian minister
- William Lyne Wilson (1843–1900), American politician and lawyer
- William M. Wilson (politician) (1838–1904), American politician
- William Othello Wilson (1869–1928), United States Army Medal of Honor recipient
- William Parkinson Wilson (1825–1874), British astronomer and professor of mathematics
- William Proctor Wilson (1921–2010), American businessman-philanthropist
- William Rae Wilson (1772–1849), Scottish lawyer, landowner and travel writer
- William Scott Wilson (born 1944), Japanese-English translator
- William Sydney Wilson (1816–1862), American politician
- William T. Wilson (born 1937), American lawyer and politician
- William Tecumseh Wilson (1823–1905), Union Army officer
- William Wallace Wilson (1876–1967), Canadian politician
- William Warfield Wilson (1868–1942), American politician
- William Wilber Wilfred Wilson (1885–1964), Canadian politician
- Willie Wilson (baseball) (born 1955), American baseball player
- Willie Wilson (businessman) (born 1948), American businessman
- Willie Wilson (drummer) (born 1947), English drummer
- Willie Wilson (footballer, born 1894), Scottish footballer
- Willie Wilson (footballer, born 1900), Scottish footballer
- Willie Wilson (footballer, born 1941), Scottish footballer
- Willie Wilson (footballer, born 1972), Scottish footballer
- Willie Wilson (speedway rider) (1923 – 2016), British motorcycle speedway rider
- Willis Wilson (born 1960), American basketball coach
- Willy Wilson (born 1980), Filipino basketball player
- Willy Wilson (baseball) (1884–1925), American baseball player
- Wilmer Wilson IV (born 1989), American artist
- Wilson Dobie Wilson (1803–1838), Scottish antiquary, author and traveller
- Wiltshire Wilson (1762–1842), British Army officer
- Winslow Wilson (1892–1974), American painter
- Winston P. Wilson (1911–1996), United States Air Force general
- Woodie Wilson (1925–1994), American stock car racing driver
- Woodrow Wilson, President of the United States from 1913 to 1921
- Woodrow Wilson (baseball) (1916–1965), American baseball player
- Woodrow Wilson (Nevada politician) (1915–1999), American politician from Nevada
- Woody Wilson (writer), American comic strip writer

=== Y ===
- Yana Wilson (born 2006), American professional golfer
- York Wilson (1907–1984), Canadian artist
- Yvette Wilson (1964–2012), American comedian
- Yvonne S. Wilson (1929–2019), American politician

=== Z ===
- Zach Wilson (born 1999), American football player
- Zara A. Wilson (born 1840), American lawyer
- Zeke Wilson (1869–1928), American baseball player
- Zelma Wilson (1918–1996), American architect
- Zoe Wilson (field hockey) (born 1997), Ireland women's hockey international
- Zuleica Wilson (born 1993), Angolan model

== Disambiguation pages ==
=== A ===
- Aaron Wilson (disambiguation)
- Adrian Wilson (disambiguation)
- Al Wilson (disambiguation)
- Alan Wilson (disambiguation)
- Albert Wilson (disambiguation)
- Alexander Wilson (disambiguation)
- Alfred Wilson (disambiguation)
- Alicia Wilson (disambiguation)
- Allen Wilson (disambiguation)
- Amy Wilson (disambiguation)
- Andrew Wilson (disambiguation)
- Anna Wilson (disambiguation)
- Anne Wilson (disambiguation)
- Archie Wilson (disambiguation)
- Arnold Wilson (disambiguation)
- Arthur Wilson (disambiguation)

=== B ===
- Barbara Wilson (disambiguation)
- Barry Wilson (disambiguation)
- Benjamin Wilson (disambiguation)
- Bernard Wilson (disambiguation)
- Bert Wilson (disambiguation)
- Bevan Wilson (disambiguation)
- Bill Wilson (disambiguation)
- Bob Wilson (disambiguation)
- Bobby Wilson (disambiguation)
- Brad Wilson (disambiguation)
- Brandon Wilson (disambiguation)
- Brent Wilson (disambiguation)
- Brian Wilson (disambiguation)
- Bruce Wilson (disambiguation)

=== C ===
- Callum Wilson (disambiguation)
- Carey Wilson (disambiguation)
- Carl Wilson (disambiguation)
- Carol Wilson (disambiguation)
- Caroline Wilson (disambiguation)
- Cecil Wilson (disambiguation)
- Cedrick Wilson (disambiguation)
- Charles Wilson (disambiguation)
- Chris Wilson (disambiguation)
- Christine Wilson (disambiguation)
- Chris Wilson (disambiguation)
- Chuck Wilson (disambiguation)
- C. J. Wilson (disambiguation)
- Clement Wilson (disambiguation)
- Clifford Wilson (disambiguation)
- Colin Wilson (disambiguation)
- Craig Wilson (disambiguation)

=== D ===
- Dale Wilson (disambiguation)
- Daniel Wilson (disambiguation)
- Dana Wilson (disambiguation)
- Darren Wilson (disambiguation)
- David Wilson (disambiguation)
- Dennis Wilson (disambiguation)
- Derek Wilson (disambiguation)
- Dick Wilson (disambiguation)
- Donald Wilson (disambiguation)
- Donovan Wilson (disambiguation)
- Doug Wilson (disambiguation)
- Douglas Wilson (disambiguation)

=== E ===
- Earl Wilson (disambiguation)
- Edward Wilson (disambiguation)
- Eddie Wilson (disambiguation)
- Edith Wilson (disambiguation)
- Edmund Wilson (disambiguation)
- Edward Wilson (disambiguation)
- Edwin Wilson (disambiguation)
- Ellen Wilson (disambiguation)
- Elliott Wilson (disambiguation)
- Elizabeth Wilson (disambiguation)
- Emanuel Wilson (disambiguation)
- Emily Wilson (disambiguation)
- Ephraim Wilson (disambiguation)
- Eric Wilson (disambiguation)
- Ernest Wilson (disambiguation)
- Eugene Wilson (disambiguation)

=== F ===
- Frances Wilson (disambiguation)
- Francis Wilson (disambiguation)
- Frank Wilson (disambiguation)
- Fred Wilson (disambiguation)
- Frederick Wilson (disambiguation)

=== G ===
- Gary Wilson (disambiguation)
- Geoff Wilson (disambiguation)
- George Wilson (disambiguation)
- Georgia Wilson (disambiguation)
- Gerald Wilson (disambiguation)
- Gilbert Wilson (disambiguation)
- Glen Wilson (disambiguation)
- Glenn Wilson (disambiguation)
- Gordon Wilson (disambiguation)
- Graham Wilson (disambiguation)
- Gregory Wilson (disambiguation)
- Guy Wilson (disambiguation)

=== H ===
- Harold Wilson (disambiguation)
- Harry Wilson (disambiguation)
- Helen Wilson (disambiguation)
- Henry Wilson (disambiguation)
- Herbert Wilson (disambiguation)
- Horace Wilson (disambiguation)
- Howard Wilson (disambiguation)
- Hugh Wilson (disambiguation)

=== I ===
- Ian Wilson (disambiguation)
- Isaac Wilson (disambiguation)
- Isaiah Wilson (disambiguation)

=== J ===
- Jack Wilson (disambiguation)
- Jacob Wilson (disambiguation)
- James Wilson (disambiguation)
- Jamie Wilson (disambiguation)
- Jared Wilson (disambiguation)
- Jason Wilson (disambiguation)
- Jasper Wilson (disambiguation)
- Jean Wilson (disambiguation)
- Jeff Wilson (disambiguation)
- Jennifer Wilson (disambiguation)
- Jenny Wilson (disambiguation)
- Jerry Wilson (disambiguation)
- Jim Wilson (disambiguation)
- Jock Wilson (disambiguation)
- Joe Wilson (disambiguation)
- Joel Wilson (disambiguation)
- John Wilson (disambiguation)
- Johnny Wilson (disambiguation)
- Jonathan Wilson (disambiguation)
- Joseph Wilson (disambiguation)
- Josh Wilson (disambiguation)
- Judy Wilson (disambiguation)
- Julian Wilson (disambiguation)
- Justin Wilson (disambiguation)

=== K ===
- Kate Wilson (disambiguation)
- Katherine Wilson (disambiguation)
- Keith Wilson (disambiguation)
- Kelly Wilson (disambiguation)
- Kenneth Wilson (disambiguation)
- Kevin Wilson (disambiguation)
- Kris Wilson (disambiguation)
- Kyle Wilson (disambiguation)

=== L ===
- Larry Wilson (disambiguation)
- Laura Wilson (disambiguation)
- Lee Wilson (disambiguation)
- Les Wilson (disambiguation)
- Leslie Wilson (disambiguation)
- Lewis Wilson (disambiguation)
- Lindsay Wilson (disambiguation)
- Lionel Wilson (disambiguation)
- Lois Wilson (disambiguation)
- Lucy Wilson (disambiguation)

=== M ===
- Mac Wilson (disambiguation)
- Malcolm Wilson (disambiguation)
- Marc Wilson (disambiguation)
- Marcus Wilson (disambiguation)
- Margaret Wilson (disambiguation)
- Marie Wilson (disambiguation)
- Marion Wilson (disambiguation)
- Mark Wilson (disambiguation)
- Martin Wilson (disambiguation)
- Marty Wilson (disambiguation)
- Marvin Wilson (disambiguation)
- Mary Wilson (disambiguation)
- Matthew Wilson (disambiguation)
- Max Wilson (disambiguation)
- Melanie Wilson (disambiguation)
- Michael Wilson (disambiguation)

=== N ===
- Nancy Wilson (disambiguation)
- Nathan Wilson (disambiguation)
- Neil Wilson (disambiguation)
- Nicholas Wilson (disambiguation)
- Nigel Wilson (disambiguation)
- Norman Wilson (disambiguation)

=== P ===
- Patrick Wilson (disambiguation)
- Paul Wilson (disambiguation)
- Peggy Wilson (disambiguation)
- Percy Wilson (disambiguation)
- Peter Wilson (disambiguation)
- Phil Wilson (disambiguation)

=== R ===
- Rachel Wilson (disambiguation)
- Ray Wilson (disambiguation)
- Reginald Wilson (disambiguation)
- Richard Wilson (disambiguation)
- Ricky Wilson (disambiguation)
- Robert Wilson (disambiguation)
- Robin Wilson (disambiguation)
- Roger Wilson (disambiguation)
- Roland Wilson (disambiguation)
- Ron Wilson (disambiguation)
- Ross Wilson (disambiguation)
- Roy Wilson (disambiguation)
- Russell Wilson (disambiguation)
- Ruth Wilson (disambiguation)
- Ryan Wilson (disambiguation)

=== S ===
- Samuel Wilson (disambiguation)
- Sandy Wilson (disambiguation)
- Sarah Wilson (disambiguation)
- Scott Wilson (disambiguation)
- Sean Wilson (disambiguation)
- Simon Wilson (disambiguation)
- Stan Wilson (disambiguation)
- Stanley Wilson (disambiguation)
- Stephen Wilson (disambiguation)
- Steve Wilson (disambiguation)
- Stuart Wilson (disambiguation)
- Susan Wilson (disambiguation)

=== T ===
- Tara Wilson (disambiguation)
- Ted Wilson (disambiguation)
- Terry Wilson (disambiguation)
- Thomas Wilson (disambiguation)
- Tim Wilson (disambiguation)
- Todd Wilson (disambiguation)
- Tom Wilson (disambiguation)
- Tony Wilson (disambiguation)
- Travis Wilson (disambiguation)
- Trevor Wilson (disambiguation)
- Troy Wilson (disambiguation)
- Tug Wilson (disambiguation)
- Tyler Wilson (disambiguation)

== Fictional characters ==
- Debbie Wilson (90210), character on the TV series 90210
- Dennis the Menace The Wilsons, Mr. George and Mrs. Martha Wilson (and 7 of their descendants) in US "Dennis the Menace" comics and various media
- Doug Wilson (Weeds character), fictional character in the television series Weeds
- Ellen Wilson (character), a character from the American science fiction web television series For All Mankind
- James Wilson (House) in the television drama House, M.D.
- Norman Wilson (The Wire), fictional character on the television drama The Wire
- Matt Wilson (Home and Away), fictional character in the Australian soap opera
- Rose Wilson, daughter of Deathstroke (Slade) in the DC Comics universe
- Sergeant Arthur Wilson in television comedy Dad's Army
- Tara Wilson in the TV series The Practice and its spinoff Boston Legal
- Wilson (Home Improvement) Wilson W. Wilson Jr. in Home Improvement television comedy series

== See also ==
- Wilhelm, Wilhelms, Wilhelmsen, Wilhelmson, Wilhelmsson
- Willem, Willems, Willemse, Willemsen, Willemsens, Willemszoon
- William, Williams (list), Williamson, Wilson (list), Willson, Willyams
