= Brad Wilson =

Brad or Bradley Wilson may refer to:

- Brad Wilson (cricketer) (born 1985), New Zealand cricketer
- Brad Wilson (soccer) (born 1972), retired American soccer midfielder
- Brad Wilson (politician) (born 1969), American politician of the Utah House of Representatives
- Brad Wilson (rugby league), Australian rugby league player
- Bradley Wilson (freestyle skier) (born 1992), American freestyle skier

== See also ==
- Braden Wilson (born 1989), American football fullback
- Bradley Wilson-Dean (born 1994), New Zealand motorcycle speedway rider
- List of people with surname Wilson
