= Wilson Martins =

Wilson Martins may refer to:

- Wilson Nunes Martins (born 1953), Brazilian politician, governor of Piauí
- Wilson Barbosa Martins (1917–2018), Brazilian centenarian, lawyer and politician, governor of Mato Grosso do Sul
- Wilson Martins (literary critic) (1921–2010), Brazilian literary critic and cultural historian

== See also ==
- Martin Wilson (disambiguation)
