= Tug Wilson =

Tug Wilson is the name or nickname of:

- Joseph Collins (1847-1933), English boxer, who competed as Tug Wilson (boxer)
- Arthur Wilson (Royal Navy officer) (1842–1921), British Royal Navy admiral of the fleet and Victoria Cross recipient
- Dyson Wilson (1926–2011), British international rugby player
- Ebin Wilson (1869–1948), American collegiate football player and coach
- Tug Wilson (British Army officer) (1921–2009), British Army colonel and founder and first commander of the Abu Dhabi Defence Force
- Ernie Wilson (English footballer) (1899–1955), English footballer for Brighton & Hove Albion
- Tug Wilson (baseball) (George Wilson, 1860–1914), Major League Baseball player
- Jimmy Wilson (footballer, born 1924) (1924–1987), English footballer for Watford
- Kenneth L. Wilson (1896–1979), American discus thrower and amateur athletics administrator
- Les Wilson (baseball) (1885–1969), American baseball player
- Roi Wilson (1921–2009), British Royal Navy captain and aviator
- Tug Wilson (footballer) (Thomas Wilson, 1917–1959), English footballer for Gillingham
- Tug Wilson (rugby) (1938–1993), English dual-code rugby player
