= Roger Wilson =

Roger Wilson may refer to:

- Roger Wilson (actor) (born 1956), American film and TV actor
- Roger Wilson (bishop) (1905–2002), bishop of Wakefield and of Chichester
- Roger Wilson (computer scientist) (born 1957), birth name of Sophie Wilson
- Roger Wilson (folk musician) (born 1961), British folk musician
- Roger Wilson (ice hockey) (born 1946), Canadian/American professional ice hockey player
- Roger Wilson (Indian Army officer) (1882–1966), Indian Army general
- Roger Wilson (rugby union, born 1870) (1870–1943), English rugby union player
- Roger Wilson (rugby union, born 1981), Irish rugby union player
- Roger B. Wilson (born 1948), American Democratic politician, former governor of Missouri
- Roger C. Wilson (1912–1988), American composer of church music
- Roger H. Wilson (born 1937), American politician in the state of Florida
- Roger "Hurricane" Wilson (born 1953), American electric blues guitarist, singer and songwriter

== See also ==
- List of people with surname Wilson
- Roger Wilson Dennis (1902–1996), American artist
