= Marvin Wilson =

Marvin Wilson may refer to:

- Marvin Wilson (American football) (born 1998), American football player
- Marvin Lee Wilson (1958–2012), American murderer
- Marvin R. Wilson (born 1935), American evangelical Biblical scholar

== See also ==
- Marvyn Wilson (born 1973), Scottish footballer
- Martin Wilson (disambiguation)
