= Isaac Wilson =

Isaac Wilson may refer to:

- Isaac Wilson (physician) (1757–1844) English physician to Haslar Naval Hospital and Royal family
- Isaac Wilson (American politician) (1780–1848), United States Representative from New York
- Isaac Wilson (English politician) (1822–1899), English industrialist and Liberal Party MP from Middlesbrough
- Isaac Wilson (New Zealand politician) (1840–1901), New Zealand MP
- Isaac Wilson (American football), American football player
