= Ernest Wilson =

Ernest Wilson may refer to:

- Ernest Henry Wilson (1876–1930), English botanist, best known as E. H. Wilson
- Ernest J. Wilson III (born c. 1948), American academic and research scholar
- Ernest Wilson (English cricketer) (1907–1981), English cricketer
- Ernest Wilson (New Zealand cricketer) (1877–1959), New Zealand cricketer
- Ernest Wilson (singer) (1951–2021), Jamaican reggae singer
- Ernest C. Wilson Jr. (1924–1992), American architect and real estate developer
- Ernest Wilson (born 1971), stage name No I.D., hip hop and R&B producer
- Ernie Wilson (1900–1982), Australian rules footballer
- Ernie Wilson (English footballer) (1899–1955), English footballer, Brighton & Hove Albion appearance record-holder

== See also ==
- Wilson (name)
