= Ron Wilson =

Ron Wilson may refer to:

== Entertainment ==
- Ron Wilson (CBC radio host) (born 1958), Canadian radio host, former host of CBC's Edmonton A.M.
- Ron Wilson (Clear Channel radio host), host of the American syndicated radio program In the Garden with Ron Wilson
- Ron Wilson (artist), comic book artist
- Ron Wilson (drummer) (1944–1989), played drums on "Wipe Out"
- Ron Wilson (magician) (1926–2010)
- Ron Wilson, former host of "Talk of the Town" on CFBC radio

== Sports ==
- Ron Wilson (footballer, born 1924) (1924–2007), English footballer with West Ham United
- Ron Wilson (footballer, born 1941), Scottish footballer with Port Vale
- Ron Wilson (ice hockey, born 1955), Canadian born American NHL coach and former player
- Ron Wilson (ice hockey, born 1956), Canadian AHL assistant coach and former NHL player
- Ron Wilson (Australian footballer) (1915–1984), Australian footballer
- Ron Wilson (rugby union) (born 1954), Scottish rugby union player
- Ronald Wilson (field hockey) (born 1948), Australian Olympic hockey player
- Ronald Elliot-Wilson (1907–1954), South African cricketer

== Others ==
- Ronald Martin Wilson (1886–1967), architect and engineer in Brisbane, Queensland, Australia
- Ronald Wilson (1922–2005), Australian lawyer and activist
- Ron Wilson (newsreader) (born 1954), Irish-born Australian television newsreader
- Ron Wilson (Australian politician) (born 1958), Victorian MP
- Ron Wilson (American politician) (born 1943), American businessman convicted in a Ponzi scheme
- Ronald S. Wilson (1933–1986), American clinical psychologist and behavioral geneticist

== See also ==
- Ronald Willson (1933–2017), English-born Zimbabwean cricketer
