= Eric Wilson =

Eric Wilson may refer to:

== Authors ==
- Eric Wilson (suspense writer) (born 1966), American author
- Eric Wilson (author) (born 1940), Canadian author

== Sports ==
- Eric Wilson (sprinter) (1900–1985), American athlete
- Eric Wilson (linebacker, born 1962), former American football player for the Buffalo Bills and Washington Redskins
- Eric Wilson (linebacker, born 1994), American football player
- Eric Wilson (Australian footballer) (born 1945), Australian rules footballer
- Eric Wilson (Canadian football) (born 1978), defensive tackle for the Montreal Alouettes
- Eric Wilson (rugby union) (born 1983), Canadian rugby union player
- Eric Wilson (racing driver), American stock car racing driver

== Others ==
- Eric Wilson (artist) (1911–1946), Australian painter
- Eric Wilson (bassist) (born 1970), member of Sublime
- Eric Charles Twelves Wilson (1912–2008), recipient of the Victoria Cross
- Eric Wilson, keyboardist and member of Wild Cub
- Eric C. Wilson, one of the Norfolk Four, a group of men who are believed to be wrongfully convicted in a rape/murder in Norfolk, Virginia
- Eric Wilson, murder victim and subject of the documentary Just Another Missing Kid
- Erik Wilson (born 1975), Norwegian cinematographer
