= Ken Wilson =

Ken, Kenneth or Kenny Wilson may refer to:

== Sports ==
- Kenneth L. Wilson (1896–1979), American track athlete
- Ken Wilson (ice hockey) (1923–2008), Canadian ice hockey executive
- Kenneth Wilson (canoeist) (born 1938), American Olympic canoer
- Ken Wilson (mountaineering writer) (1941–2016), British mountaineering writer, editor and publisher
- Kenny Wilson (footballer) (born 1946), Scottish footballer
- Ken Wilson (sportscaster) (born 1947), American sports broadcaster
- Ken Wilson (rugby league) (1951–2022), Australian rugby league player
- Kenneth Wilson (rugby union), Scotland international rugby union player
- Ken Wilson (American football) (born 1964), American football coach
- Kenny Gasana (formerly Kenny Wilson, born 1984), American-born Rwandan basketball player
- Kenny Wilson (baseball) (born 1990), American baseball outfielder
- Tug Wilson (rugby) (1938–1993), English rugby union player

== Others ==
- Kenneth Wilson (politician), member of the Missouri House of Representatives
- Kenneth Wilson (theologian), British theologian, philosopher and teacher
- Kenneth G. Wilson (author) (1923–2003), American author and editor
- Kenneth T. Wilson (born 1936), American politician in the New Jersey General Assembly
- Kenneth G. Wilson (1936–2013), American theoretical physicist
- Kenneth B. Wilson (born 1938), Justice of the New Mexico Supreme Court
- Ginger Fish (born 1965, Kenneth Robert Wilson), American drummer

== See also ==
- Wilson (name)
