= Cecil Wilson =

Cecil Wilson may refer to:

- Cecil Wilson (bishop of Bunbury) (1860–1941), Anglican Bishop of Melanesia, and cricketer
- Cecil Wilson (politician) (1862–1945), British pacifist Labour Party Member of Parliament
- Cecil Wilson (bishop of Middleton) (1875–1937), Anglican Bishop of Middleton
- Cecil Wilson (journalist) (1909–1997), English journalist
- Cecil E A Wilson, known as Tugg Wilson, (1930-2006), English navy aviation officer and cartoonist
