= Lee Wilson =

Lee Wilson may refer to:

== Sportsmen ==
- Lee Wilson (footballer, born 1972), English football player and manager
- Lee Wilson (footballer, born 1993), Scottish football goalkeeper for Cowdenbeath
- Lee Wilson (American football) (1905–1970)

== Others ==
- Robert E. Lee Wilson (1865–1933), plantation owner and owner of Lee Wilson and Company
- Lee Wilson (1938-2013), English comedian

== See also ==
- Leigh Wilson (born 1957), American writer
