= Clement Wilson =

Clement Wilson may refer to:

- Clement Wilson (sprinter) (1891–1983), American sprint athlete
- Clement Wilson (writer) (born 1976), Irish journalist, author and travel writer
- Clem Wilson (1875–1944), English cricketer and Church of England clergyman
- Ruckus (comics), also known as Clement Wilson, fictional Marvel Comics mutant supervillain
