= Welcome W. Wilson Sr. =

American real estate executive (1928–2024)

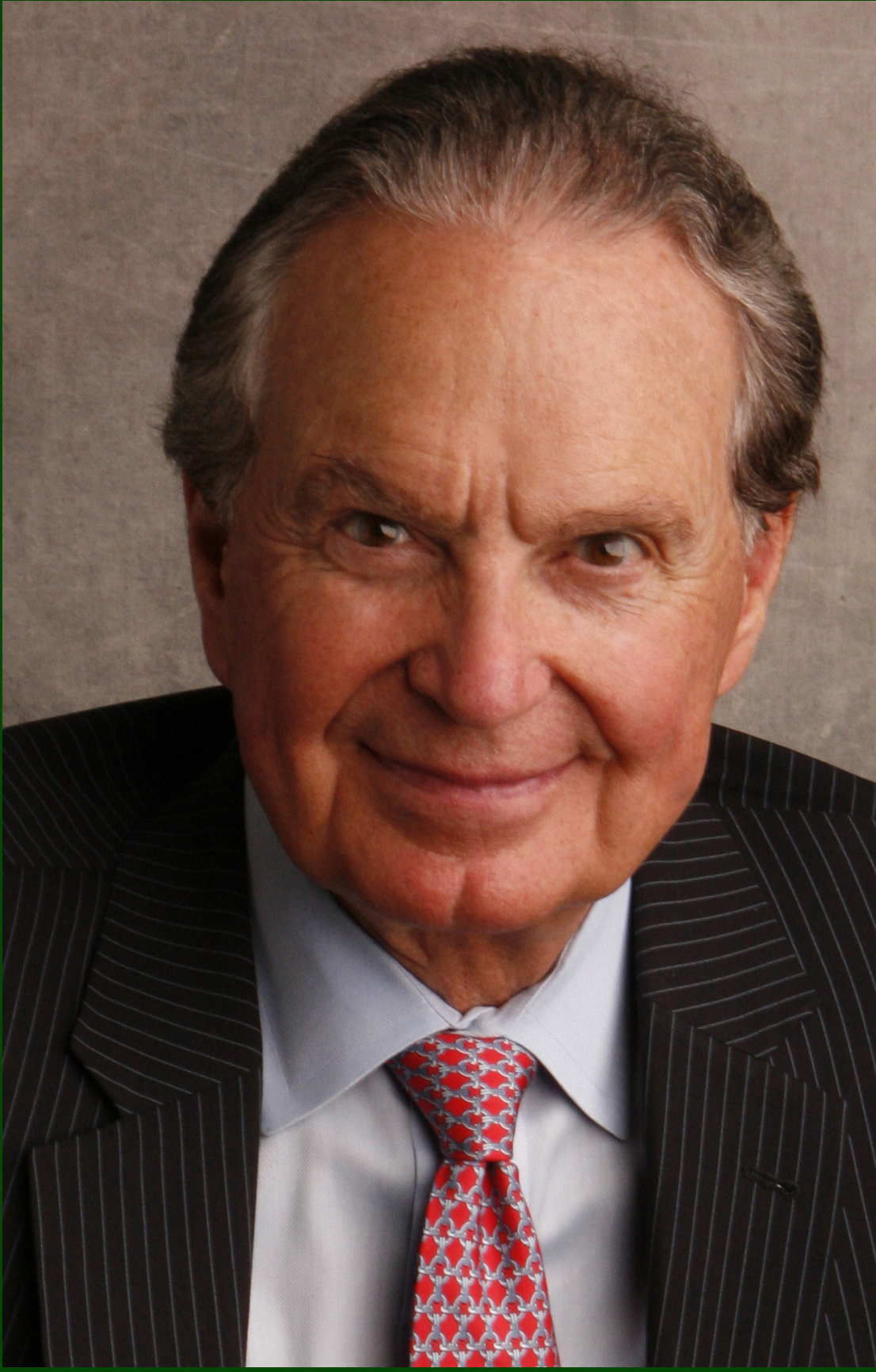
- Born: Welcome Wade Wilson; March 17, 1928
- Died: February 16, 2024 (aged 95)
- Education: Texas Southmost College (AA); University of Houston (BBA)
- Board member of: Welcome Group (Chairman)
- Children: 5
- Website: www.welcomegroup.com

Welcome Wade Wilson Sr. (March 17, 1928 – February 16, 2024) was an American real estate developer, businessman, civic leader, and former chairman of the University of Houston System Board of Regents. He was the founder and longtime chairman of Houston-based Welcome Group LLC, a commercial real estate development and investment firm focused on industrial, manufacturing, distribution, and specialized commercial properties across Texas and the Southeastern United States.

Wilson was known for his decades-long involvement in Texas real estate development, public service, higher education advocacy, and civic leadership in Houston. His early development projects included the master-planned communities of Jamaica Beach and Tiki Island in Galveston County.

== Early life and education ==
Wilson was born in San Angelo, Texas, on March 17, 1928. During his youth, his family lived in Corpus Christi and Brownsville before later settling in Houston.

He graduated from high school in Brownsville in 1944 and attended Texas Southmost College, earning an Associate of Arts degree in 1946. He later enrolled at the University of Houston, where he studied business administration and worked for the student newspaper, The Cougar, serving in advertising sales and later as business manager.

Wilson graduated from the University of Houston in 1949 with a Bachelor of Business Administration degree. On the day of his graduation, he married Joanne Guest Wilson, whom he remained married to for 74 years.

== Military and federal government service ==
Following college, Wilson served as a naval officer in Japan during the Korean War.

He later served in the Executive Office of the President during the administrations of Presidents Dwight D. Eisenhower and John F. Kennedy as a regional director for Civil and Defense Mobilization operations across five states. During this period, he witnessed both atomic and hydrogen bomb tests conducted by the United States government.

In 1958, Wilson received the Arthur S. Flemming Award, recognizing outstanding federal employees. In 1966, President Lyndon B. Johnson appointed him as Special Ambassador to Nicaragua.

== Real estate career ==
Wilson began his real estate career in the 1950s and became a prominent Houston commercial real estate developer. Among his earliest major projects were Jamaica Beach and Tiki Island, two master-planned waterfront communities in Galveston County that later became incorporated cities.

Over the course of more than six decades in business, Wilson developed and invested in a broad range of projects including industrial facilities, office buildings, hotels, retail centers, apartments, and manufacturing properties throughout Texas and other U.S. markets.

He founded and led Welcome Group LLC, a Houston-based commercial real estate investment and development company. Under Wilson and later his son, Welcome W. Wilson Jr., the company expanded into an industrial and manufacturing-focused real estate company with properties across Texas and the Southeastern United States.

Wilson also served as chairman of an American Stock Exchange-listed company, owned interests in Houston-area banks, and at one point held a 10% ownership stake in the Houston Astros baseball team while serving on its board of directors.

== University of Houston and civic leadership ==
Wilson maintained a lifelong relationship with the University of Houston and became one of its most influential alumni and philanthropic advocates. He served on the University of Houston System Board of Regents from 2006 to 2011 and served as chairman from 2007 to 2010.

During his tenure, Wilson played a significant role in the university's efforts to achieve Tier One research university status. He also supported the hiring of Chancellor and President Renu Khator. Wilson additionally helped support the establishment of the Jack J. Valenti School of Communication.

Wilson additionally served as director emeritus of the Greater Houston Partnership and chaired its higher education committee for many years.

The University of Houston later established the Welcome Wilson Houston History Collaborative in recognition of his support for preserving Houston history and public scholarship.

== Awards and achievements ==
Wilson received numerous honors during his career, including:

- University of Houston Distinguished Alumnus Award (1970)
- University of Houston Bauer College Distinguished Alumnus Award (1996)
- Texas Southmost College Distinguished Alumnus Award (2005)
- Honorary Doctor of Humane Letters, University of Houston (2013)
- Distinguished Alumnus Award, University of Texas Rio Grande Valley (2018)
- Induction into the Texas Business Hall of Fame
- Lifetime Achievement Award from the Houston Business Journal
- Arthur S. Flemming Award for federal service

== Personal life and death ==
Wilson and his wife, Joanne Guest Wilson, had five children. Their daughter Pamela Francis Wilson predeceased him.

Wilson died in Houston on February 16, 2024, at the age of 95.
