= Barbara Wilson =

Barbara Wilson may refer to:

- Barbara Wilson (astronomer) (1947–2019), American amateur astronomer and director of the George Observatory
- Barbara Wilson (author) (born 1950), author of the Lambda Award-winning novel on which the 2001 film Gaudi Afternoon was based
- Barbara Wilson (sprinter) (born 1952), Australian sprinter
- Barbara Wilson (psychologist) (born 1941), British neuropsychologist
- Barbara Ker Wilson (1929–2020), English-born Australian novelist
- Barbara J. Wilson (born 1957), American academic and university president
- Barbara Wilson (singer), Panamanian jazz singer in the 1940s
- Barbara Wilson (Batgirl), fictional movie character in Batman and Robin
