= Emily Wilson =

Emily Wilson may refer to:

- Emily Wilson (classicist) (born 1971), British translator of Homer
- Emily Wilson (actress) (born 1985), American actor in soap opera General Hospital
- Emily Wilson (journalist) (born 1970), British editor of New Scientist magazine (2018–2024)
- Emily Wilson (footballer) (born 2001), Northern Irish forward
- Emily Wilson Walker (1904–2007), American physician
