= Douglas Wilson =

Douglas or Doug Wilson may refer to:

== Sports ==
- Doug Wilson (athlete) (1920–2010), British athlete
- Doug Wilson (rugby union) (1931–2019), New Zealand rugby union player
- Doug Wilson (ice hockey) (born 1957), retired professional hockey player, former GM of the San Jose Sharks
- Doug Wilson (racing driver), retired NASCAR Cup Series driver
- Douglas Wilson (basketball) (born 1999), American college basketball player

== Other ==
- Douglas Wilson (bishop) (1903–1980), Anglican bishop in the Caribbean
- Douglas Wilson (RAAF officer) (1898–1950), Royal Australian Air Force officer
- Douglas Wilson (interior designer), designer on the television program Trading Spaces
- Douglas Wilson (theologian) (born 1953), Christian pastor and author
- Douglas L. Wilson (born 1935), professor and co-director of Lincoln Studies Center at Knox College
- Doug Wilson (Weeds character), fictional character in the television series Weeds, portrayed by actor Kevin Nealon
- Douglas Wilson (activist) (1950–1992), gay activist from Canada

== See also ==
- Dougal Wilson (born 1971), English director
- Dougie Wilson (born 1994), Northern Irish footballer
