= Aaron Wilson =

Aaron Wilson may refer to:

- Aaron Wilson (bowls) (born 1991), Australian bowler
- Aaron Wilson (director) (born 1976), Australian film director
- Aaron Wilson (lacrosse) (born 1980), Canadian lacrosse player
- Aaron Wilson (priest) (1589–1643), Anglican clergyman

== See also ==
- Aaron Wilson House, a historic home in New York state
