= Boyd Wilson =

Australian musician

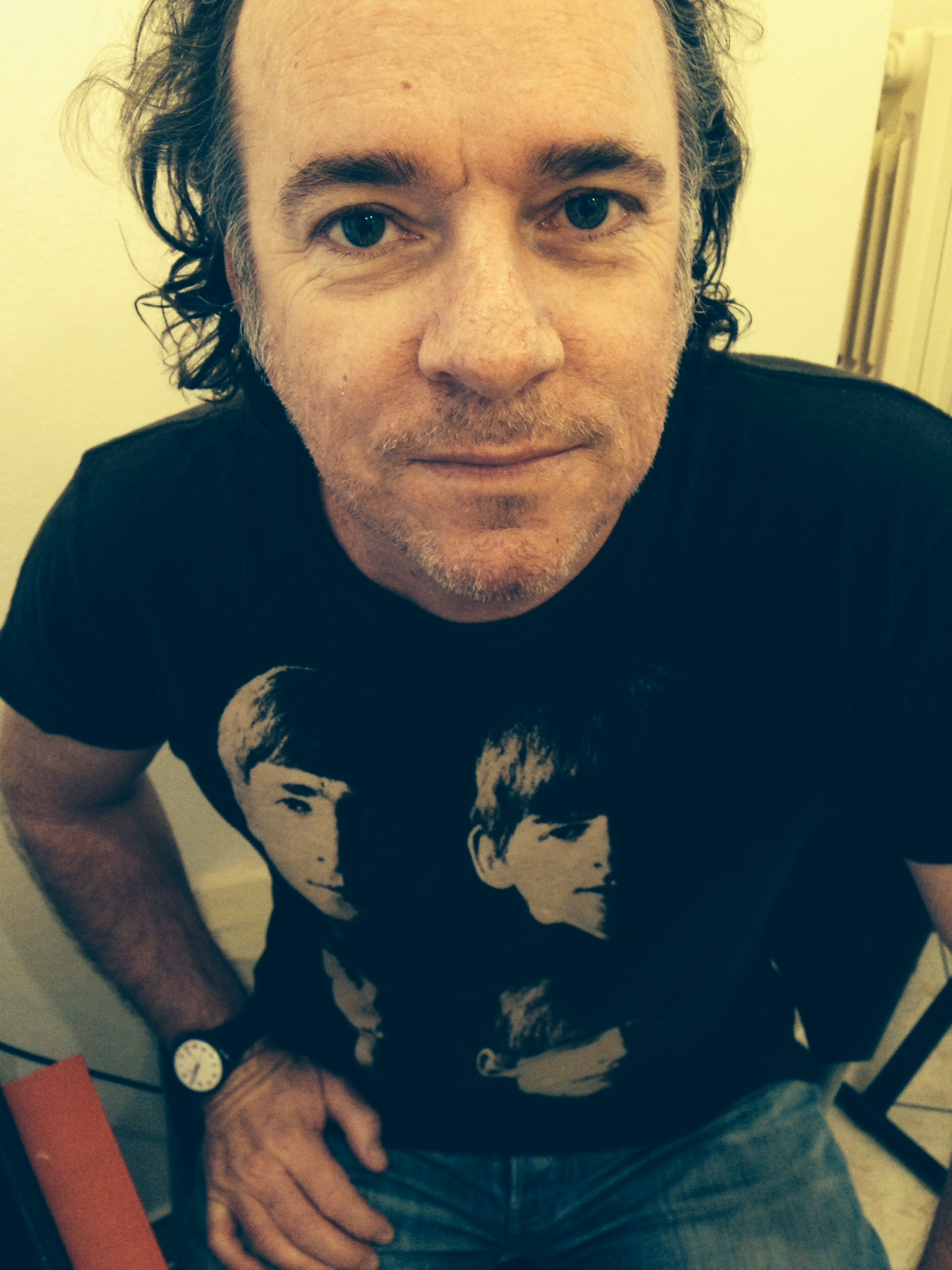
- Wilson in 2014

Background information
- Born: Boyd Lalor Wilson; 11 February 1959 (age 67); Perth, Australia
- Genres: Pop
- Occupations: Musician, singer, songwriter
- Instruments: Vocals, piano, guitar, bass, ukulele
- Years active: 1975–present
- Labels: Massive Records, Toshiba EMI, Chrysalis Music UK, Warner Chapel U.K

Boyd Lalor Wilson (born 11 February 1959) is an Australian musician and songwriter. He was vocalist and keyboardist in one of Perth's biggest bands, The Fingerprints, in 1979 and later The Kind, 1985 featuring Mark Lizotte, Denise Demarchi, Yak Sherrit, Suze DeMarchi, Dean Denton and Gary Dunn. During this time, Wilson played keyboards and backing vocals for Dave Warner on his album Correct Weight (1979), later touring with Warner. In 1989, Wilson was signed by the President of Chrysalis Records in UK as a writer collaborating and writing with Alan Tarney, Kevin Peek, Keith Potger, Trevor Spencer, Robin Hild, Patrick Dollaghan, Eric Lowen and Dan Navarro. Lowen and Navarro released a co-write with Wilson titled "Rapt in You" on their album Walking on a Wire. "Rapt in You" was also released by Cameron Daddo in 1992 on his album A Long Goodbye. Wilson also co-wrote several tracks with guitarist and singer/songwriter Nuno Bettencourt.

Music industry awards include the U.S.A. Hollywood Radio & T.V Commercials Award for worldwide productions in 1989.

== Career ==
In 1990, Wilson formed the international act Living Daylights with Demarchi. They were signed to Massive Records through EMI and Toshiba EMI Japan, releasing three singles: "Sliding", "Naturally" and "Merry Go Round". "Merry Go Round" was their highest charting single, peaking at number 105 on the ARIA Charts in June 1993. Their debut album was recorded at 301 studios in Sydney, with sound engineer Guy Gray. In Japan, their debut album reached Top 10 in many prefectures. The musical The Bridge with the script written by Louise Helfgott had songs and music by Wilson, Demarchi and Helfgott. In 1997, it won an Australia Day award for benefits to the community and overall excellence. Wilson and Demarchi co-founded and were Musical Directors for Variety WA's Variety Youth Choir. They released a CD in 2001 titled Big Heart. Wilson and Demarchi enlisted a group of legendary special guests featuring Rolf Harris, John Paul Young, Jill Perryman (Boy from Oz), Russell Morris, Keith Potger and others. In May 2000, Variety WA awarded Boyd and Demarchi the prestigious "Variety Heart of Show business Award" for founding and producing the Variety Youth Choir.

He has co-written the platinum-selling title track to The Seekers' Future Road album. He wrote all the songs for the United Artists film Windrider starring Nicole Kidman and Tom Burlinson. He has been chosen to be the voice of the West Coast Eagles song. He also sang the South African National Anthem at the rugby series against Australia on the birthday of Nelson Mandela in 1998.

Wilson spent years living and working in Rome, Milan, Italy and Stockholm, Sweden, producing and co-writing for artist Mia Milan. Their original track "I Won't Cry" was used for Channel 9's series House Husbands in Australia in 2012. Milan also won the "Voice on" festival in Rome, Italy with this track. Other production credits include Milan performing on Maria de Fillipi's talent show "Amici" in Italy in 2012, and took part in Festival di Castrocaro in 2013.

== Current ==
Wilson spent the last five years working in Los Angeles producing and co-writing for pop artist Pigtails and is now based in Rome, Italy.
