= Ephraim Wilson =

Ephraim King Wilson may refer to:

- Ephraim King Wilson (1771-1834), U.S. congressman from the state of Maryland
- Ephraim King Wilson II (1821-1891), U.S. senator from the state of Maryland and son of Ephraim King Wilson
