= Will Wilson (artist) =

American artist (born 1957)

- Born: August 18, 1957 (age 68); Baltimore, Maryland
- Education: Schuler School of Fine Arts; The New York Academy of Art
- Website: willwilsonart.com

Will Wilson (born 1957) is an American artist known for portrait paintings, illustrations and Trompe L'Oeil works. His works are held in the collections of the Smithsonian's National Portrait Gallery.

== Early life and education ==
Wilson was born on August 18, 1957. He attended the Schuler School of Fine Arts, in his hometown of Baltimore, Maryland, from 1975 to 1979.

== Career ==
Wilson currently lives and works in San Francisco, California.

An illustration by Wilson was featured as the cover art on Michael Jackson album Blood on the Dance Floor: HIStory in the Mix released in 1997.

In June 2008, former Maryland governor Bob Ehrlich Jr. unveiled his official portrait painted by Will Wilson. The two were childhood friends in Baltimore, Maryland. A portrait of Reynolds Price painted by Wilson is held in the collection of the National Portrait Gallery in Washington, D.C.
