= Georgia Wilson =

Georgia Wilson may refer to:

- Georgia Wilson (field hockey) (born 1996), Australian field hockey player
- Georgia Wilson (equestrian) (born 1995), British para-equestrian
- Georgia Wilson (footballer) (born 2002), English footballer
- Georgia Wilson (rugby league), English rugby league player

== See also ==
- Georgina Wilson (born 1986), Filipino-British model, actress, host and VJ
