= Barry Wilson =

Barry Wilson may refer to:

- Barry Wilson (American football) (born 1943), American football coach
- Barry Wilson (artist) (born 1952), Haisla artist
- Barry Wilson (footballer) (born 1972), Scottish footballer
- Barry Wilson (Royal Navy officer) (1936–2018), British naval officer, first captain of HMS Cardiff
- Barry Wilson (rugby league), Papua New Guinean rugby league coach

== See also ==
- Barrie Wilson, Canadian historian
- B. J. Wilson (Barrie James Wilson, 1947–1990), English rock drummer
