= Susan Wilson (disambiguation) =

Susan Wilson (born 1951) is an American author.

Susan or Sue Wilson may also refer to:

- Sue Wilson, American politician
- Sue Wilson (Veep), fictional television character
- Susan Wilson, victim of video voyeurism, dramatized in television show Video Voyeur
- Susan R. Wilson (1948–2020), Australian statistician
- Susan Wilson (director), New Zealand actor and director
