= Lionel Wilson =

Lionel Wilson may refer to:

- Lionel Wilson (geophysicist), British volcanologist and planetary scientist
- Lionel Wilson (politician) (1915–1998), mayor of Oakland, California (1977–1991)
- Lionel Wilson (rugby union) (1933–2017), South African rugby player
- Lionel Wilson (voice actor) (1924–2003), voice actor
