= Mac Wilson =

Mac Wilson may refer to:

- Mac Wilson (footballer, born 1914) (1914–2017), Carlton Australian rules footballer
- Mac Wilson (footballer, born 1922) (1922–1996), Melbourne Australian rules footballer

== See also ==
- Mack Wilson (born 1998), American football player
- Max Wilson (disambiguation)
