= Samuel Wilson (disambiguation) =

Samuel Wilson (1766–1854) was an American meat packing baron alleged to be the original "Uncle Sam".

Samuel Wilson may also refer to:

== Politics ==
- Sir Samuel Wilson (Portsmouth MP) (1832–1895), Irish-Australian pastoralist and politician
- Sir Samuel Herbert Wilson (1873–1950), British colonial governor
- Samuel Davis Wilson (1881–1939), American mayor of Philadelphia
- Samuel Franklin Wilson (1845–1923), American Confederate veteran, politician and judge
- Sammy Wilson (politician) (born 1953), Northern Irish politician

== Sports ==
- Samuel Wilson (footballer) (born 1983), Nicaraguan footballer
- Sammy Wilson (footballer, born 1931) (1931–2014), Scottish footballer
- Sammy Wilson (footballer, born 1937) (1937–2022), Northern Irish footballer

== Other ==
- Samuel Alexander Kinnier Wilson (1878–1937), British neurologist who first described Wilson's disease in 1912*
- Samuel J. Wilson (1828–1883), Presbyterian academic and pastor
- Samuel Grayson Wilson (born 1949), U.S. federal judge
- Samuel B. Wilson (1873–1954), American lawyer and judge from Minnesota
- Samuel V. Wilson (1923–2017), United States Army, former Director DIA and intelligence guru
- Samuel Wilson (East India Company officer), career Bombay Army officer, reaching rank of major general
- Samuel Thomas "Sam" Wilson, a Marvel Comics superhero known as the Falcon
  - Sam Wilson (Marvel Cinematic Universe), film version of the character
