= Todd Wilson =

Todd Wilson may refer to:

- Todd Wilson (organist), American musician
- Todd Wilson (director) (1963–2005), American film director
- Todd Wilson (security guard) (died 1991), American security guard killed in Father's Day Bank Massacre
- Todd Wilson (skier), American former Nordic combined skier
- Todd Wilson (discus thrower) (born 1968), American discus thrower, 1991 All-American for the Washington Huskies track and field team
