= Reginald Wilson =

Reginald Wilson may refer to:

- Reginald Wilson (psychologist) (1929–2020), American psychologist
- Reg Wilson (born 1948), English speedway team manager and former rider
- Reg Wilson (golfer) (1888–1959), English golfer
- Sir Reginald Victor Wilson (1877–1957), Australian businessman and politician
