= Jasper Wilson =

Jasper Wilson may refer to:

- Jasper Wilson (basketball) (born 1947), American former professional basketball player
- Jasper Wilson (politician) (1819–1896), Baptist preacher and representative from Bulloch County in the Georgia Legislature from 1881–1885
