= Gilbert Wilson =

Gilbert Wilson may refer to:

- Gilbert Livingston Wilson (1869–1930), American ethnographer and Presbyterian minister
- Gilbert Brown Wilson (1907–1991), American painter and muralist
- Gilbert Wilson (bishop) (1918–1999), Bishop of Kilmore, Elphin and Ardagh, 1981–1993
- Gilbert "Whip" Wilson (born 1947), member of the New Jersey General Assembly
- Gilbert Wilson (banker) (1908–1994), New Zealand central banker
- Gilbert Wilson (geologist) (1899–1986), British structural geologist
