= Trevor Wilson =

Trevor Wilson may refer to:

- Trevor Wilson (footballer) (1950–2026), Australian rules footballer
- Trevor Wilson (baseball) (born 1966), American baseball player
- Trevor Wilson (basketball) (born 1968), American basketball player
- Trevor Wilson (Casualty), fictional security guard in medical drama series

== See also ==
- K. Trevor Wilson (born 1981), Canadian comedian
