= Howard Wilson =

Howard Wilson may refer to:

- Howard Wilson (American football) (born 1995), American football cornerback
- Howard K. Wilson (c. 1906–?), American football and basketball coach
- Howard Wilson (physicist), British professor of plasma physics
- Highball Wilson (born Howard Wilson; 1878–1934), American baseball player
- Howard Wilson, bank robber, see Linwood bank robbery

== See also ==
- Howard Wilson Emmons (1912–1998), American professor in the department of mechanical engineering
