= Tyler Wilson =

Tyler Wilson may refer to:

- Tyler Wilson (American football) (born 1989), American football player
- Tyler Wilson (baseball) (born 1989), American baseball player
- Tyler Wilson (footballer) (born 1989), American-born Puerto Rican footballer (soccer)
