= Nicholas Wilson =

Nicholas Wilson may refer to:

- Elijah Nicholas Wilson (1842–1915), known as "The White Indian Boy"
- Nick Gage (Nicholas Wilson, born 1980), professional wrestler
- Nicholas Wilson (parson) (died 1548), English clergyman
- Nicholas Wilson, Lord Wilson of Culworth (born 1945), British judge
- Nick Wilson (field hockey) (born 1990), New Zealand field hockey player
- Nick Wilson (American football) (born 1996), American football running back
- Nicholas Wilson (alpine skier) (born 1960), British former alpine skier
- Nick Wilson (Survivor contestant) (born 1990), Survivor: David vs. Goliath winner and Kentucky politician
- George Nicholas Wilson (born 1942), state legislator in Arkansas who served as President of the Arkansas Senate
