= Roy Wilson =

Roy Wilson may refer to:

- Sir Roy Wilson (British politician) (1876–1942), British member of parliament
- Roy Wilson (baseball) (1896–1969), Major League Baseball player
- Roy Wilson (Canadian politician) (born 1932), Canadian provincial politician
- Sir Roy Wilson (lawyer) (1903–1982), British lawyer
- M. Roy Wilson (born 1953), president of Wayne State University
- Roy Wilson, Jamaican singer of Higgs and Wilson
- Reno Wilson (Roy Wilson, born 1969), American actor
