= Nancy Wilson =

Nancy Wilson may refer to:

- Nancy Wilson (jazz singer) (1937–2018), American jazz singer and actress
- Nancy Wilson (religious leader) (born 1950), Moderator of the Metropolitan Community Churches
- Nancy Wilson (rock musician) (born 1954), American rock singer and guitarist for the band Heart
- Nancy Wilson (journalist) (born 1955), Canadian television journalist
- Nancy Wilson (basketball) (born 1969), professional and college basketball coach
- Nancy Wilson-Pajic (born 1941), American artist
- Nancy Wilson Ross (1901–1986), American novelist
