= Clifford Wilson =

Clifford Wilson may refer to:

- Clifford Wilson (nephrologist), British nephrologist and professor of medicine
- Clifford E. Wilson (1946–2018), American politician in the New York State Assembly
- Clifford B. Wilson (1879–1943), American politician, Lieutenant Governor of Connecticut
- Cliff Wilson (1934–1994), Welsh snooker player
- C. J. Wilson (defensive end) (born 1987, Clifford James Wilson), American football player
