= Marcus Wilson =

Marcus Wilson may refer to:

- Marcus W. Acheson (1828–1906), United States federal judge
- Marcus Wilson (American football) (born 1968), American running back
- Marcus Wilson (basketball), (born 1977), American basketball player
- Marcus Wilson (baseball), (born 1996), American baseball player
- Marcus Wilson (footballer), (born 2002), Guyanese association football player
- Marcus Wilson (Gaelic footballer) (1932–2023), Irish Gaelic footballer
- Marcus Wilson (producer), television producer on Doctor Who episodes such as "The Almost People"
