= Dennis Wilson (disambiguation) =

Dennis Wilson (1944–1983) was an American musician and one of the original members of The Beach Boys.

Dennis or Denis Wilson may also refer to:

- Dennis Wilson (composer) (1920–1989), British composer of television scores
- Dennis Wilson (poet) (1921–2022), British poet of World War II
- Dennis Main Wilson (1924–1997), British television and radio producer
- Denis Wilson (footballer) (1936–2026), English footballer
- Dennis Wilson (Kansas politician) (1950-2020), a member of the Kansas state legislature
- Dennis Wilson (racing driver) (born 1952), American racing driver
- Chip Wilson (Dennis J. Wilson, born 1955), American-Canadian businessman, investor, and philanthropist
- E. Denis Wilson, American physician after whom Wilson's temperature syndrome is named
