= Darren Wilson =

Darren Wilson may refer to:

- Darren Wilson (footballer, born 1971), English footballer, see List of Bury F.C. players (25–99 appearances)
- Darren Wilson (umpire) (born 1974), Australian rules football boundary umpire
- Darren Wilson (musician) (born 1986), drummer of The Hush Sound, an American indie rock band
- Darren Wilson (born 1986), American police officer who fatally shot Michael Brown
