= Jerry Wilson =

Jerry Wilson may refer to:

- Jerry Wilson, founder of Soloflex
- Jerry Wilson (ice hockey) (1937–2011), Canadian ice hockey forward
- Jerry Wilson (defensive back) (born 1973), former American football safety
- Jerry Wilson (defensive end) (1936–2015), American football defensive end
- Jerry Wilson (sailor) (1906–1945), Canadian Olympian
- Jerry Wilson (hurdler) (born 1950), American hurdler, winner of the 1972 110 metres hurdles at the NCAA Division I Outdoor Track and Field Championships
