= Arnold Wilson (disambiguation) =

Arnold Wilson may refer to:

- Arnold Wilson (1840–1940), British civil commissioner in Baghdad 1918–1920
- Arnold Muir Wilson (1857–1909), British solicitor and politician
- Arnold Manaaki Wilson (1928–2012), New Zealand artist and educator
- Arnie Wilson (1885–1971), Australian rules footballer
