= Simon Wilson =

Simon Wilson or Willson may refer to:

== Sports ==
- Simon Wilson (cricketer) (born 1970), New Zealand cricketer
- Simon Wilson (cyclist) (born 1980), in 2011 British National Track Championships
- Simon Wilson (equestrian), New Zealand equestrian
- Simon Wilson (fencer) (born 1958), Paralympic fencer and Team GB coach at the 2012 Summer Paralympics
- Simon Wilson (hurler), Irish hurler

== Others ==
- Simon Wilson (actor), British actor
- Simon Wilson (producer), a producer for the BBC series Kröd Mändoon and the Flaming Sword of Fire
- Simon Wilson (editor), New Zealand editor, writer, and political analyst for the newspaper NZ Herald and formerly the magazine Metro
- Simon Willson, Hong Kong radio producer/personality
