= Gerald Wilson (disambiguation) =

Gerald Wilson (1918–2014) was an American jazz trumpeter, big band bandleader, composer, arranger, and educator.

Gerald Wilson may also refer to:

- Gerald Wilson (writer), Canadian writer
- Gerald Wilson (cricketer) (born 1936), English cricketer
- Gerald H. Wilson (1945–2005), American Old Testament scholar
- Jerry Wilson (sailor) (1906–1945, Gerald Wilson), Canadian sailor

== Others ==
- Gerry Wilson (ice hockey) (1937–2011), Canadian ice hockey forward
