= Brent Wilson =

Brent Wilson may refer to:

- Brent Wilson (rugby union) (born 1981)
- Brent Wilson (filmmaker)
- Brent Wilson (musician) (born 1987)
