= Ross Wilson =

Ross Wilson may refer to:

== Sports ==
- Ross Wilson (Nordic skier) (1909-1997), Canadian Olympic skier
- Ross Wilson (ice hockey) (1919–2002), Canadian hockey player
- Ross Wilson (sprinter) (born 1950), Australian sprinter in Athletics at the 1970 British Commonwealth Games
- Ross Wilson (long-distance runner) (born 1969), New Zealander in 1988 IAAF World Cross Country Championships – Junior men's race
- Ross Wilson (table tennis) (born 1995), British Paralympic table tennis player
- Ross Wilson (cyclist) (born 1981), Canadian para-cyclist
- Ross Wilson (football executive) (born 1984), Scottish football executive

== Others ==
- Ross Wilson (musician) (born 1947), Australian musician, songwriter, and singer
- Ross L. Wilson (born 1955), U.S. diplomat and ambassador
- Ross Wilson (artist) (born 1958), Irish artist and sculptor
