= Halena Wilson =

Chicago activist, educator, and cooperative movement leader

- Born: 1897; Denver, Colorado
- Died: April 16, 1975 (aged 77–78)
- Known for: President of the Ladies Auxiliary to the Brotherhood of Sleeping Car Porters (1930–1956)

Halena Wilson (1897 – April 16, 1975) was an American activist, educator, and cooperative movement leader based in Chicago. She served as president of the Ladies Auxiliary to the Brotherhood of Sleeping Car Porters from 1930 to 1956.

== Biography ==
Wilson was born in Denver, Colorado and educated in Denver public schools. As an adult, she described her childhood self as “a troubled young girl who wanted to do good”. Wilson felt “aimless and unproductive” in Denver, and eventually moved to Chicago, and married porter Benjamin Wilson (date unknown). She and Benjamin never had kids, and lived in a 4-bed apartment on Chicago's south side for many years. “They had no children. She belonged to the Truth Seekers Liberal Church. “ Before her political/activist career, Wilson “became active in a number of social and civic movements and served as a Worthy Matron of the Order of the Eastern Star, a group with which she remained actively affiliated for a number of years.”

=== The Chicago Colored Women’s Economic Council ===
Wilson became involved with the Brotherhood of Sleeping Car Porters through her husband, Benjamin, a “rank and file brotherhood porter” in the 1920s, and was elected the first president of the Chicago Colored Women's Economic Council in October 1930, serving in the role through the title change to the Ladies Auxiliary, until 1956. The ethos of the Economic Council was to play a supporting role in the Brotherhood of Sleeping Car Porters (BSCP), founded by A Phillip Randolph in 1925, though there was an "open membership policy that allowed the women to address non-union matters." While in regards to female stereotyping, the Economic Council strived "to overcome such stereotypes, and to present a positive image by stressing organization, race, pride, and cultural uplift.", the group never actually challenged the idea that women were subordinate to men at the time.

=== International Ladies’ Auxiliary to the Brotherhood of Sleeping Car Porters ===
In 1937, at the directive of A. Philip Randolph, the Colored Women's Economic Council merged to form the Ladies Auxiliary to the Brotherhood of Sleeping Car Porters, with Wilson at the helm. Wilson saw her role as president to be that of an educator, writing several articles for the Black Worker, setting up a scholarship fund for local members, fundraising for the union, and encouraging all local chapters to run local educational campaigns focused on the benefits of unionization.

Wilson was also a huge proponent of co-ops, and wanted to ensure that women who were members of the ladies auxiliary, whether employed or unemployed, were conscious of their buying power. She leveraged consumer cooperatives in the auxiliary, attempting to ensure that money stayed within the labor movement rather than being used for sellers that did not support them. These activities "shows how the co-op strategy was developed among Black activists between 1935 and 1952, and sheds light on African American women’s roles in advancing and implementing that strategy."

== Later years ==
Wilson served as the president of the Auxiliary to the BSCP until 1956, when the Brotherhood voted to dissolve the Ladies Auxiliary, at which point Wilson, whose health was failing, stepped down and turned over her responsibilities to A. Philip Randolph. Wilson's husband had died in 1955, but the BSCP continued to pay her yearly salary so long as she did not remarry. In her last years, Wilson used a wheelchair and struggled with heart disease. She died on April 16, 1975.
