= Jason Wilson =

Jason Wilson may refer to:

- Jason O. Wilson, American author and martial arts coach
- Jason Wilson (politician) (born 1968), Democratic member of the Ohio Senate
- Jason Wilson (musician) (born 1970), Canadian musician and author
- Jason Wilson (field hockey) (born 1987), Australian national team field hockey player
- Jason Wilson (ice hockey) (born 1990), Canadian ice hockey player
- Jason Wilson (triathlete) (born 1990), triathlete from Barbados
