= Tim Wilson =

Tim Wilson may refer to:

- Tim Wilson (broadcaster), New Zealand television news reporter and anchor
- Tim Wilson (canoeist), Australian canoeist
- Tim Wilson (comedian) (1961–2014), American comedian and country music artist
- Tim Wilson (filmmaker), American filmmaker known as Black Magic Tim
- Tim Wilson (American football) (1954–1996), American football running back
- Tim Wilson (Australian politician) (born 1980), Australian politician and commentator
- Tim Wilson (British politician) (born 1961), former British politician who appeared on The Circle

== See also ==
- Timothy Wilson, American psychologist
