= Troy Wilson =

Troy Wilson may refer to:

- Troy Wilson (Australian rules footballer), Australian speedway driver and ex Australian footballer
- Troy Wilson (defensive back)
- Troy Wilson (defensive lineman), American football player
