= Craig Wilson =

Craig Wilson may refer to:

- Craig Wilson (water polo) (born 1957), water polo player
- Craig Wilson (third baseman, born 1964), Major League Baseball (MLB) third baseman
- Craig Wilson (third baseman, born 1970), MLB third baseman
- Craig Wilson (first baseman) (born 1976), MLB outfielder/first baseman
- Craig Wilson (cricketer) (born 1974), South African cricketer
- Craig Wilson (curler) (born 1973), Scottish curler
- Craig Wilson (footballer) (born 1986), Scottish footballer
- Craig Wilson (columnist), writer of USA Today column The Final Word
- Craig Wilson (rugby league) (born 1969), Australian rugby league player
