= Bevan Wilson =

Bevan Wilson may refer to:

- Bevan Wilson (rugby union, born 1956), New Zealand rugby union international
- Bevan Wilson (rugby, born 1927) (1927–2012), Australian rugby union international
