= Carey Wilson =

Carey Wilson may refer to:

- Carey Wilson (writer) (1889–1962), American screenwriter, voice actor, and producer
- Carey Wilson (ice hockey) (born 1962), Canadian ice hockey centre
