= Adrian Wilson =

Adrian Wilson may refer to:

- Adrian Wilson (book designer) (1923–1988), American book designer and printer
- Adrian Wilson (artist) (born 1964), British artist and photographer
- Adrian Wilson (actor) (born 1969), South African model and actor
- Adrian Wilson (American football) (born 1979), American football executive and former safety
