= Orlando Wilson (television presenter) =

American television personality (born 1947)

Orlando Wilson (born 1947) is an American former sportsman television personality, best known as host of the show Fishin' with Orlando Wilson. An accomplished angler, he placed in the Top Ten of the BASS Tournament Trail seven times from 1979–1998. His television career began on WTBS in Atlanta in 1982. The show transferred to The Nashville Network in 1993 and ran until 2000 when Wilson retired from broadcasting. The show featured Wilson fishing in both fresh and salt water at various locations in the United States. The 30 minute running time and celebrity guests, along with Wilson's folksy stories told in his North Georgia accent made it one of TNN's most popular daytime shows.

After retiring from broadcasting, Mr. Wilson founded several banks in North Georgia, many of which have since failed.
