= Malcolm Wilson =

Malcolm Wilson may refer to:

- Malcolm Wilson (politician) (1914–2000), governor of New York, 1973–1974
- Malcolm Wilson (motorsport) (born 1956), British rally driver and motorsports personality
- Malcolm Wilson Bridge, a bridge in New York State, also known as the Tappan Zee Bridge
- Malcolm Wilson (botanist) (1882–1960), Scottish botanist
