= Ryan Wilson =

Ryan Wilson may refer to:

== Sportspeople ==
- Ryan Wilson (wrestler), American wrestler
- Ryan Wilson (ice hockey) (born 1987), Canadian ice hockey player
- Ryan Wilson (hurdler) (born 1980), American hurdler
- Ryan Wilson (racing driver), American stock car racing driver
- Ryan Wilson (rugby union) (born 1989), Scottish rugby union player
- Ryan Wilson (rugby league) (born 1993), English rugby league footballer who has played in the 2010s for Doncaster, and West Hull A.R.L.F.C.
- Ryan Giggs (Ryan Joseph Wilson, born 1973), Welsh footballer
- Ryan Wilson (bowler) on List of world bowling champions
- Ryan Wilson (runner), winner of the 1996 3000 meters at the NCAA Division I Indoor Track and Field Championships

== Others ==
- Ryan Wilson (poet) (born 1982), American poet
- Ryan Wilson, American guitarist in The Love Willows
- Ryan Wilson, guitarist for The Pigeon Detectives
- Ryan Wilson, guitarist for The Holy Fire
