= Lois Wilson =

Lois Wilson may refer to:

- Lois W. also known as Lois Wilson (née Burnham) (1891–1988), American co-founder of Al-Anon and wife of Alcoholics Anonymous founder Bill W.
- Lois Wilson (actress) (1894–1988), actress in silent films
- Lois Miriam Wilson (1927–2024), first female Moderator of the United Church of Canada, 1980–1982
- Lois Wilson (Doctors), a fictional character from the British soap opera Doctors
- Lois Wilson Langhorst (née Lois Wilson; 1914–1989), American modernist architect
