= Melanie Wilson =

Melanie Wilson may refer to:

- Rebel Melanie Elizabeth Wilson (born 1980), Australian actress, comedian, and producer
- Melanie Wilson (actress) (born 1961), American actress
- Melanie Wilson (rower) (born 1984), British rower
- Melanie D. Wilson, American academic administrator and law professor
