= Matthew Wilson =

Matthew Wilson may refer to:

== Entertainment ==
- Matt Wilson (artist), American artist known for his work on role-playing games
- Matt Wilson (comics artist), American comic book colorist
- Matt Wilson (singer) (born 1963), of Trip Shakespeare and the Flops
- Matt Wilson (jazz drummer) (born 1964), American jazz drummer
- Matthew Henry Wilson (1814–1892), British-American painter
- Matt Wilson (Home and Away), a fictional character in the Australian soap opera
- Matt Wilson, semifinalist on the twenty-first season of American Idol

== Sports ==
- Matt Wilson (footballer) (1842–1897), Irish international footballer of 1880s
- Matt Wilson (racing driver) (born 1984), American racing driver
- Matthew Wilson (rally driver), British rally driver
- Matthew Wilson (cyclist) (born 1977), Australian road cyclist
- Matthew Wilson (swimmer) (born 1998), Australian swimmer

== Other ==
- Matthew Wilson (patriot) (1731–1790), American patriot
- Matthew Wilson (politician) (born 1984), Georgia state representative
- Matthew Wilson (gardener), garden designer, writer and broadcaster
- Matthew J. Wilson, president of the University of Akron, 2016–2018
- Matt Wilson (crater), elliptical crater in the Northern Territory, Australia
- Edward Knott (1582–1656), real name Matthew Wilson, English Jesuit controversialist

== See also ==
- Mathew Wilson (1802–1891), British politician
- Sir Mathew Wilson, 4th Baronet, (1875–1958), British landowner, soldier, and Unionist politician
