= Russell Wilson (disambiguation) =

Russell Wilson (born 1988) is an American football quarterback.

Russell Wilson may also refer to:

- Russell Wilson (Canadian politician) (1864–1936), mayor of Saskatoon, Saskatchewan, Canada
- Russell Wilson (American politician) (1876–1946), mayor of Cincinnati, Ohio, United States
- Russell Wilson (cricketer) (born 1959), English cricketer
- Russell T. Wilson, mathematics professor and college basketball and baseball coach in the first part of the 20th century
- Russell Wilson, an Australian space tourist who flew on Blue Origin NS-30

== See also ==
- Russell Willson (1883–1948), American vice admiral
