= Edith Wilson (disambiguation) =

Edith Wilson (1872–1961) was the First Lady of the United States, the second wife of President Woodrow Wilson.

Edith Wilson may also refer to:

- Edith Wilson (singer) (1896–1981), American blues singer and vaudeville performer
- Edith C. Wilson (1899–?), American lawyer
