= Laura Wilson =

Laura Wilson may refer to:

- Laura Wilson (actress) (born 1983), New Zealand actress
- Laura Wilson (photographer) (born 1939), American photographer
- Laura Wilson (writer) (born 1964), English crime novel writer
- Laura Wilson (cross-country skier) (born 1969)
- Laura May Tilden Wilson (1872–1928), Nevada's first female lawyer

== Fictional characters ==
- Laura Wilson, supporting character from the 2009 disaster film 2012
- Laura Wilson, protagonist of the 2014–9 comic book series The Wicked + The Divine

== See also ==
- Laura Annie Willson (1877–1942), English engineer and suffragette
