= Percy Wilson =

Percy Wilson may refer to:

- Percy Wilson (footballer) (1889–1941), Australian rules footballer
- Percy Wilson (RAF officer) (1895–?), British World War I flying ace
- Percy Wilson (baseball) (1899–1979), American Negro leagues baseball player
- Percy Wilson (botanist) (1879–1944), American botanist
- Percy Wilson (American football) (1890–1936), American football player
- T. P. Wilson (1819–1881), Anglican priest and author
