= Isaac Wilson (physician) =

British physician (1757–1844)

Sir Isaac Wilson FRS FRSE

Personal details
- Born: 1757
- Died: 2 December 1844 (aged 86–87) Bognor, Sussex, England
- Occupation: Physician

Sir Isaac Wilson (1757 – 2 December 1844) was a British physician who served as physician to the Duke and Duchess of Kent and was Director of the Haslar Naval Hospital.

== Life ==
In 1816 he became a Fellow of the Medico Chirurgical Society and is listed as "Domestic Physician to the Duchess of Kent. He was also senior physician at the Naval Hospital in Plymouth.

In 1831 he was elected a Fellow of the Royal Society of London and in 1834 was elected a Fellow of the Royal Society of Edinburgh. His proposer for the latter was Alexander Copland Hutchison.

He retired as head physician of Haslar Naval Hospital in Portsmouth in 1840. This position was seen as a "prize" amongst naval surgeons and other holders included Nelson's personal physician, Sir William Beatty.

He lived at Fareham in Hampshire. He died in Bognor on 2 December 1844. His will is held in the National Archive at Kew.
