= Travis Wilson =

Travis Wilson may refer to:

- Travis Wilson (wide receiver) (born 1984), American football wide receiver
- Travis Wilson (American football, born 1993), American football quarterback and tight end
- Travis Wilson (politician), American state legislator in Missouri
- Travis Wilson (softball) (born 1977), New Zealand softball and baseball player
