= Carl Wilson (disambiguation) =

Carl Wilson (1946–1998) was an American singer, guitarist and composer, best known as a founding member of The Beach Boys.

Carl Wilson may also refer to:

- Carl Wilson (album), 1981 self-titled album by Carl Wilson
- Carl Wilson (writer) (born 1967), Canadian cultural critic
- Carl Wilson (footballer) (1940–2019), English footballer
- Carl Wilson (New York politician) (born 1991), member of the New York City Council
- Carl Wilson (Oregon politician) (born 1955), member of the Oregon House of Representatives
- Carl Wilson (swimmer) (born 1967), Australian swimmer
