= Patrick Wilson (disambiguation) =

Patrick Wilson (born 1973) is an American actor.

Patrick Wilson may also refer to:

- Patrick Wilson (astronomer) (1743–1811), British astronomer, type-founder, mathematician and meteorologist
- Patrick Wilson (architect) (1798–1871), British architect
- Patrick Wilson (librarian) (1927–2003), American librarian, information scientist and philosopher
- Paddy Wilson (1933–1973), Northern Ireland politician
- Paddy Wilson (footballer) (born 1946), Scottish footballer
- Patrick Wilson (composer), British musician and composer
- Patrick Wilson (drummer) (born 1969), American drummer for the band Weezer
- Patrick Wilson (New Zealand actor)
- Patrick Wilson (footballer) (born 1994), Australian rules footballer for Adelaide

== See also ==
- Pat Wilson (born 1948), Australian female singer
