= Guy Wilson =

Guy Wilson may refer to:

- Sir Guy Wilson (public servant) (1851–1940), British public servant
- Guy Wilson (politician) (1877–1943), British soldier, company director, and politician
- Guy Wilson (cricketer) (1882–1917), English cricketer
- Guy Wilson (horticulturalist) (1885–1962), Irish horticulturalist
- Guy Wilson (rugby union) (1907–1979), English rugby union player
- Guy Wilson (historian) (born 1950), British military historian and former head of the Royal Armouries
- Guy Wilson (speedway rider) (fl.1991), Australian speedway rider
- Guy Wilson (actor) (born 1985), American actor

== See also ==
- Richard Guy Wilson (born 1940), American architectural historian
