= C. J. Wilson (disambiguation) =

C. J. Wilson may refer to:

- C. J. Wilson (born 1980), American baseball player
- C. J. Wilson (safety) (born 1985), American football safety
- C. J. Wilson (defensive end) (born 1987), American football defensive tackle
- C. J. Wilson (cornerback) (born 1989), American football cornerback
- C. J. Wilson (actor) (born 1970), actor

== See also ==
- Wilson (surname)
