= Tara Wilson =

Tara Wilson may refer to:

- Tara Wilson (born 1982), Canadian actress and choreographer
- Tara Lynn Wilson (born 1979), Canadian actress
- Tara Wilson (pageant titleholder), former Miss West Virginia USA
- Tara Wilson (Boston Legal), a fictional character from The Practice and its spinoff Boston Legal
