= Hilda Wilson =

British contralto and composer

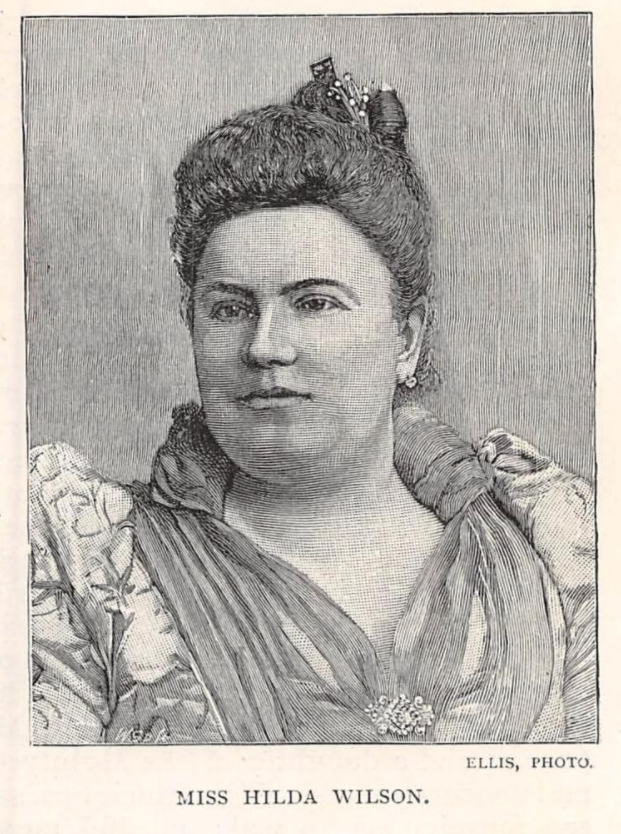
Hilda Wilson, 1890s

Hilda Wilson (7 April 1860 – 10 December 1918) was a British contralto and composer who also used the name Matilda Ellen Wilson and composed under the name Douglas Hope.

== Life ==
Wilson was born into a musical family in Monmouth. Her father James Wilson was the bandmaster of the Monmouth Volunteer Corps. Her sister Agnes became a professional contralto, their brother James taught at the West London Conservatoire of Music, another brother, Henry Lane Wilson, (1871–1915), was a pianist, composer and baritone, and a third, W. Stroud Wilson, became a well-known violinist. Hilda's early years were largely spent in Gloucester, where her family moved when she was four. She made her debut as a soloist at the age of 15 in a performance of Messiah at the Gloucester Shire Hall. The following year, a reviewer in The Western Mail wrote:

Miss Hilda Wilson is a promising contralto of about 16, with an exceedingly good, though not powerful, voice. Her vocalisation is clear and truthfully in tune. And although it would be flattery to say that she has nothing to learn, we may say that she has already acquired a very good style, and is likely to become a great favourite.

Her vocal range in her early years was unusually wide. She was heard in concert in mezzo soprano and soprano solos, and was invited to sing the soprano part in Haydn's The Creation before being guided towards a career as a contralto.

In 1879 Wilson became a student at the Royal Academy of Music (RAM) in London, where she won several awards, including the Westmorland Scholarship (twice), the Parepa-Rosa gold medal, and bronze and silver medals at the yearly examinations. She was later elected a Fellow of the RAM, a member of the Royal Society of Musicians, and an associate of the Philharmonic Society of London.

During the 1880s and 1890s Wilson was a frequent soloist at the Three Choirs Festivals. In addition to singing in the mainstays of the festivals' repertoire such as Messiah and Mendelssohn's Elijah and St Paul, she took part in less often heard works such as Mozart's Requiem and Sullivan's The Prodigal Son and in newer works including Dvořák's Stabat Mater. She sang at music festivals in other parts of Britain, including those at Chester (1885), Wolverhampton (1886), Leeds (1886, 1889, 1895), Norwich (1887), Bristol (1890), Birmingham (1891, 1894) and Cardiff (1892). Edward Elgar composed some songs for her in October 1890, one of which was called "Garlands". At the Birmingham festival in 1891 she took part in the world premiere of Dvořák's Requiem.

In London, Wilson performed frequently as a soloist with the Bach Choir and the Royal Choral Society, and at concerts at the Crystal Palace. In 1890 she sang in Beethoven's Choral Symphony for the Philharmonic Society and in 1892 she was the contralto soloist in a performance of Messiah in Westminster Abbey. On more than one occasion she appeared together with her brother Lane at the Steinway Hall. After one such recital in 1900 The Times commented:

Few of the songs were in the least well known to concert-goers, and most of them merit a closer acquaintance. Miss Hilda Wilson sang Dvořák's Biblical song, "The Lord is my Shepherd", most beautifully, and the most notable of her other performances were those which she gave of her own, "Even such is time", a Scotch song, "McGregor Amaro", and an old English song, "The village swain", the last of which she had to repeat.

She took part in two Henry Wood Promenade Concerts in 1896, and in 1900 her song "Wheresoe'er You Are" had its first performance during the Last Night of the Proms. After retiring from the concert platform she devoted herself to teaching, and became president of the West London Conservatoire of Music, an institution created by the Wilson family.

Wilson married Ashley Hart of Bristol on 16 July 1904. She died in Boscombe, Hampshire, on 10 December 1918, aged 58.

== Compositions ==
Wilson's compositions include:

=== Musical theatre ===
- Nymphs and Shepherds (a "song play", including poems by Frederick Keel)

=== Vocal ===
- "From Overseas"
- "My Roses"
- "When Birds Do Sing"
- "Wheresoe'er You Are"
