= Christine Wilson =

Christine Wilson may refer to:

- Christine Wilson (priest) (born 1958), British Church of England priest
- Christine S. Wilson (born 1970), American attorney on the Federal Trade Commission
- Christine Wilson (scientist), Canadian-American physicist and astronomer

== See also ==
- Christina Wilson (born 1979), American chef and reality television personality
- Christine Spittel-Wilson (1912–2010), British writer and artist
