= Roland Wilson =

Roland Wilson may refer to:

- Sir Roland Wilson, 2nd Baronet (1840–1919), British writer on law and India
- Roland Wilson (conductor) (born 1951), British cornet player and conductor based in Germany
- Sir Roland Wilson (economist) (1904–1996), Australian economist
