= Scott Wilson =

Scott Wilson may refer to:

== People ==
=== Sportspeople ===
- Scott Wilson (1980s rugby league), former rugby league footballer
- Scott Wilson (bodybuilder) (1950–2018), American bodybuilder
- Scott Wilson (rugby league, born 1970), Australian former professional rugby league footballer
- Scott Wilson (footballer, born 1977), Scottish footballer (Rangers, Dunfermline, North Queensland Fury)
- Scott Wilson (footballer, born 1982), Scottish footballer (Airdrie, Clyde, Stranraer)
- Scott Wilson (ice hockey) (born 1992), Canadian ice hockey player
- Scott Wilson (footballer, born 1993), English footballer (Macclesfield)
- Scott Wilson (footballer, born 2000), English footballer (Burnley, Barrow)
- Scott Wilson (rugby union) (born 2002), Irish rugby player

=== Other people ===
- Scott Wilson (academic) (born 1962), scholar in media and cultural theory
- Scott Wilson (actor) (1942–2018), American actor
- Scott Wilson (composer) (born 1969), Canadian composer
- Scott Wilson (judge) (1870–1942), judge on the United States Court of Appeals for the First Circuit
- Scott Wilson (musician) (born 1972), American musician and producer
- Scott Wilson, guitarist of American metal band Demiricous
- Scott Barchard Wilson (1864–1923), ornithologist and bird collector

== Enterprises ==
- Scott Wilson Group, a UK-based civil engineering consultancy
