= Jamie Wilson =

Jamie Wilson may refer to:

- Jamie Wilson (American football) (born 1973), American football offensive tackle
- Jamie Wilson (snooker player) (born 2003), English snooker player
- Jamie Lee Wilson, Australian singer, songwriter and music producer
- Jamie Wilson (beauty queen), Miss Louisiana winner
- Jamie D. K. Wilson, British biologist
