= Joel Wilson =

Joel Wilson may refer to:

- Joel Wilson (American football) (born 2000), American football player
- Joel Wilson (rugby) (born 1977), Australian rugby union player
- Joel Wilson (umpire) (born 1966), Trinidadian cricket umpire
