= R. J. Wilson =

American politician from Pittsburg, Kansas

Representative R. J. Wilson
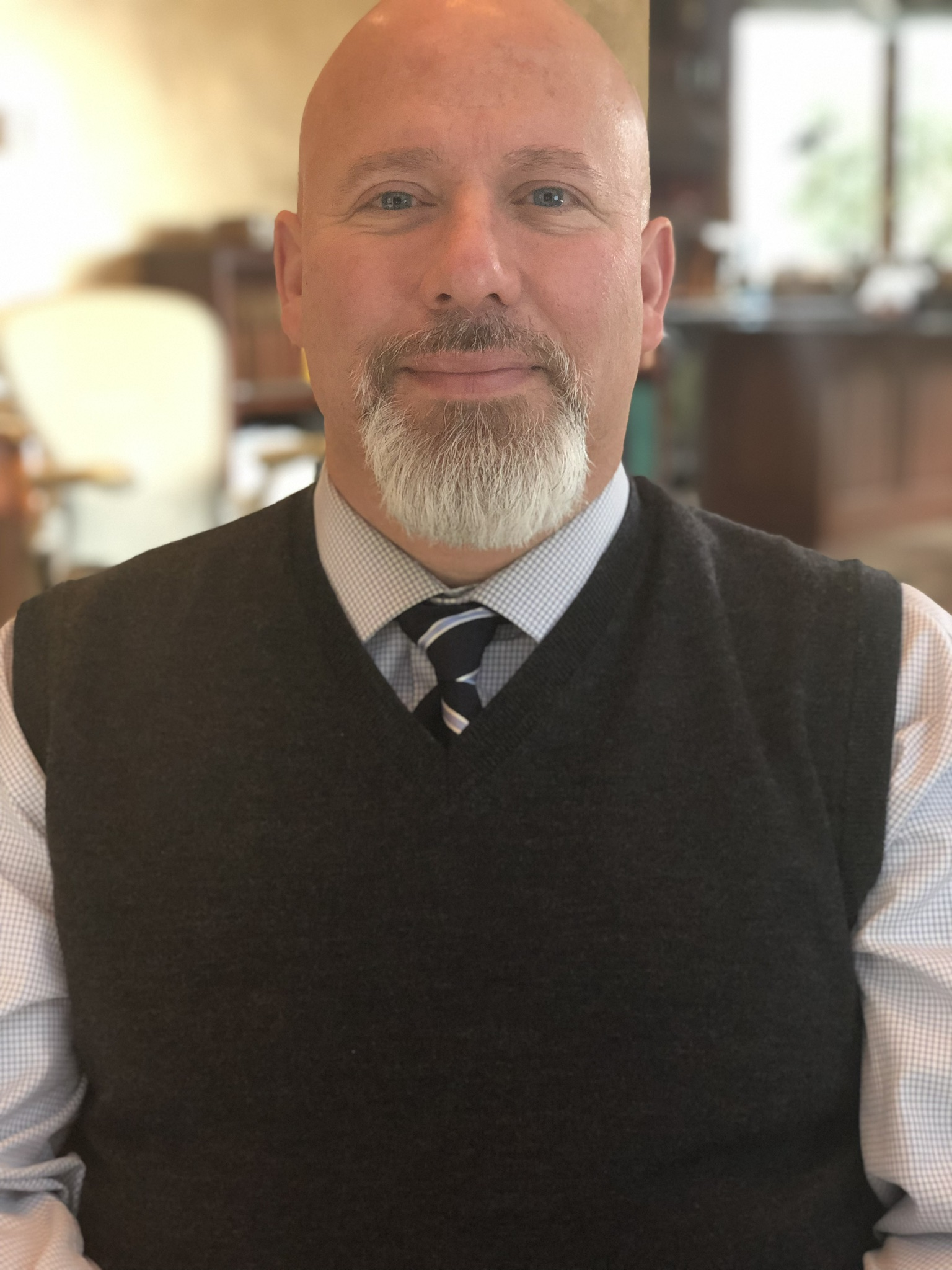

Member of the Kansas House of Representatives from the 3rd district
- In office January 8, 2001 – January 9, 2005
- Preceded by: Ed McKechnie
- Succeeded by: Julie Menghini

Personal details
- Born: July 16, 1971 (age 55)
- Party: Democratic
- Children: 3
- Education: Pittsburg State University
- Profession: Politician

Robert Jeffery Wilson (born July 16, 1971) is an American politician from Pittsburg, Kansas.

Wilson was born in Fort Scott, Kansas. He received a BA from Pittsburg State University in 1994.

Wilson was elected to the Kansas House of Representatives in 2000 and served for four years (2001-2005). He was preceded in office by Ed McKechnie and succeeded by Julie Menghini. While a member of the Kansas House, Wilson served as Assistant Minority Leader from 2003 to 2005. He left the Legislature to pursue the Office of Crawford County Clerk to which he was elected in a Democratic Primary in 2004 facing no opposition.

Wilson worked in the private sector starting in 2008 after which he returned to the public sector in 2021 serving as the Deputy County Clerk and Chief Election Officer of Douglas County, Kansas. In 2023, he became the Chief of Staff to House Minority Leader Vic Miller.
