= Eric Wilson (Australian footballer) =

Australian rules footballer

Personal information
- Full name: Eric Wilson
- Born: 29 April 1945 (age 81)
- Original team: Korumburra
- Height: 193 cm (6 ft 4 in)
- Weight: 91 kg (201 lb)

Playing career^{1}
| Years | Club | Games (Goals) |
| 1966–67 | South Melbourne | 7 (0) |
- ^{1} Playing statistics correct to the end of 1967.

Eric Wilson (born 29 April 1945) is a former Australian rules footballer who played with South Melbourne in the Victorian Football League (VFL).
