= Alyson Wilson =

American statistician

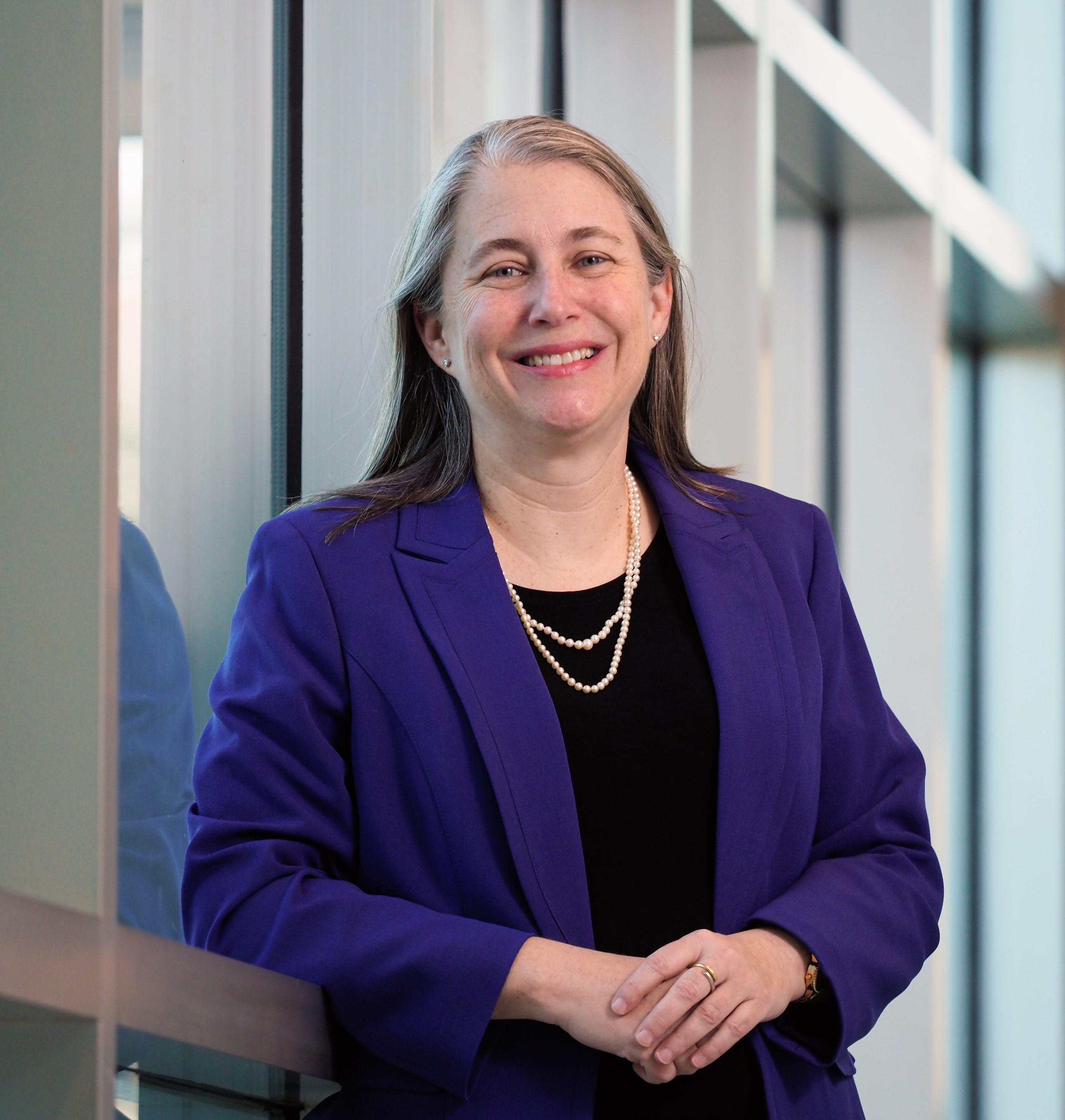
- Born: Alyson G. Wilson; 1967 (age 58–59)
- Education: Duke University
- Occupations: Statistician; Professor; Associate Vice Chancellor; Vice Provost for Research

Alyson Gabbard Wilson (born 1967) is an American statistician known for her work on Bayesian methods for reliability estimation and on military applications of statistics. She is the Vice Provost for Research at William & Mary.

== Education and career ==
Wilson graduated summa cum laude from Rice University in 1989. After earning a master's degree in statistics from Carnegie Mellon University in 1990, she completed a Ph.D. at Duke University in 1995. Her dissertation, Statistical Models for Shapes and Deformations, was supervised by Valen E. Johnson.

After completing her doctorate, Wilson worked in the defense industry as a statistician for four years before joining the research staff at Los Alamos National Laboratory in 1999, working on the statistical reliability of weapons. She moved to Iowa State University as an associate professor of statistics in 2008, and then moved again to the Institute for Defense Analyses in 2011. She returned to academia as an associate professor at North Carolina State University in 2011, and was promoted to full professor in 2015. In 2020 she became Associate Vice Chancellor for National Security and Special Research Initiatives at North Carolina State; in 2024 she was promoted to Senior Associate Vice Chancellor for Research Initiatives and Commercialization and served as Interim Vice Chancellor for Research in 2024-2025.

== Book ==
With Michael S. Hamada, C. Shane Reese, and Harry F. Martz, Wilson is a co-author of the book Bayesian Reliability (Springer, 2008).

== Recognition ==
Wilson became a Fellow of the American Statistical Association in 2008, an Elected Member of the International Statistical Institute in 2012, and a Fellow of the American Association for the Advancement of Science in 2015.

She won the Army Wilks Award of the Conference on Applied Statistics in Defense, given periodically for "a substantial contribution to statistical methodology and application relevant to national defense" (and not to be confused with the Samuel S. Wilks Memorial Award of the American Statistical Association) in 2015. In 2018, she won the Distinguished Achievement Award of the American Statistical Association Section on Statistics in Defense and National Security.
