= Ruth Wilson (disambiguation) =

Ruth Wilson (born 1982) is an English actress.

Ruth Wilson may also refer to:

- Ruth Wilson (missing person) (born 1979), a teenager who disappeared in England in 1995
- Ruth Wilson (Neighbours), a soap opera character played by Stephanie Daniel

== See also ==
- Ruth Wilson Epstein (1906—1996), American nurse married to alleged spy Jacob Epstein
- Ruth Wilson Gilmore (born 1950), American prison abolitionist and prison scholar
