= Clement Wilson (writer) =

Irish writer

- Born: 11 May 1976 (age 50); Ireland
- Education: Glenalmond College; Trinity College Dublin
- Occupations: Journalist, author, travel writer
- Organizations: British Guild of Travel Writers; Chartered Institute of Journalists
- Known for: Books on the Gumball 3000 rally and Iceland

Clement Wilson (born 11 May 1976) is a journalist, author and travel writer. Born in Ireland, he was educated at Glenalmond College and Trinity College, Dublin and currently lives in Edinburgh. His journalism has appeared in numerous newspapers and magazines and he has written books on the Gumball 3000 rally (with jockey Richard Dunwoody) and Iceland amongst other subjects. He is a member of The British Guild of Travel Writers and the Chartered Institute of Journalists.
