= Neil Wilson =

Neil Wilson may refer to:

- Neil Wilson (figure skater) (born 1978), British figure skater
- Neil Wilson (baseball) (1935–2013), Major League Baseball player
- Neil Wilson (athlete) (1930–2023), New Zealand runner
- Neal C. Wilson (1920–2010), General Conference president of the Seventh-day Adventist Church, 1979–1990
- H. Neill Wilson (c.1854–1926), American architect
