= Bruce Wilson =

Bruce Wilson may refer to:

- Bruce Wilson (journalist) (1941–2006), Australian sports journalist who mainly worked in England
- Bruce Wilson (bishop) (1942–2021), Australian Anglican Bishop of Bathurst
- Bruce Wilson (soccer) (born 1951), Canadian soccer player and coach
