= Marion Wilson =

Marion Wilson may refer to:

- Marion Wilson (boxer) (born 1956), American heavyweight boxer
- Marion Wilson (murderer) (1976–2019), American convicted murderer
- Marion Wilson (artist), American artist and professor
