= Cedrick Wilson =

Cedrick Wilson may refer to:

- Cedrick Wilson Sr. (born 1978), American football player in the NFL from 2001 to 2007
- Cedrick Wilson Jr. (born 1995), son of Cedrick Wilson Sr. and American football player drafted in the NFL in 2018
- Cedric Wilson (born 1948), politician in Northern Ireland
- C. W. M. Wilson (Cedric Wilson, 1923–1993), British pharmacologist and medical historian
