= Maurice Wilson (footballer) =

Scottish footballer

Personal information
- Full name: Maurice Wilson
- Place of birth: Scotland
- Position: Wing half

Senior career*
Years	Team	Apps	(Gls)
1910–1915	Queen's Park	58	(1)
- * Club domestic league appearances and goals

Maurice Wilson was a Scottish amateur footballer who played as a wing half in the Scottish League for Queen's Park.

== Personal life ==
Wilson served as a sergeant in the Royal Field Artillery during the First World War.

== Career statistics ==
Appearances and goals by club, season and competition
Club	Season	League			Scottish Cup		Other		Total	
Club	Season	Division	Apps	Goals	Apps	Goals	Apps	Goals	Apps	Goals
Queen's Park	1910–11	Scottish First Division	1	0	0	0	0	0	1	0
Queen's Park	1911–12	Scottish First Division	12	0	0	0	0	0	12	0
Queen's Park	1912–13	Scottish First Division	16	0	0	0	0	0	16	0
Queen's Park	1913–14	Scottish First Division	28	1	0	0	1 (Note: Appearance in Glasgow Cup)	0	29	1
Queen's Park	1914–15	Scottish First Division	1	0	―		0	0	1	0
Career total			58	1	0	0	1	0	59	1
