= Earl Wilson =

Earl Wilson may refer to:

- Earl Wilson (politician) (1906–1990), U.S. representative from Indiana
- Earl Wilson (columnist) (1907–1987), American journalist
- Earl Wilson (baseball) (1934–2005), American baseball pitcher
- Earl Wilson (gridiron football) (born 1958), American gridiron football player
- Earl Wilson (triple jumper) (born 1901), American triple jumper, runner-up at the 1926 USA Outdoor Track and Field Championships
