= Tugg Wilson =

Cartoonist in British navy

Cecil E A Wilson
- Nickname: "Tugg"
- Born: Southampton, Hampshire, England
- Died: 22 October 2006 (aged 76) Salisbury, Wiltshire, England
- Allegiance: United Kingdom
- Branch: Royal Navy
- Service years: 1947—1972
- Rank: Lieutenant (Royal Navy)
- Awards: MBE

Cecil E A Wilson, also known as "Tugg" Wilson, (1930 – 22 Oct 2006), was a commissioned aviation officer in the Royal Navy whose humorous cartoons depicting situations in naval life, signed ‘Tugg’, earned him widespread popularity, the award of an MBE and the accolade from the Navy News magazine that "no other individual in the post war era has done more for the morale of the Royal Navy than Tugg Wilson." In his latter years he was a contributing cartoonist to many British newspapers and a humorous illustrator of industrial safety manuals.

== Background ==
Wilson was educated at the Royal Hospital School, Holbrook and joined the Royal Navy as a Naval Aircraft Handler in 1947.

== Naval career ==
He served in the Fleet Air Arm of the Royal Navy throughout his service and achieved the rank of Petty Officer before being promoted to commissioned rank in 1964.

Early in his naval career Wilson started drawing cartoons depicting everyday events in the life of his fellow sailors. Their popularity led to a strip entitled "Jack" depicting an ever-hopeful but not-too-bright Able Seaman appearing in editions of the magazine Navy News for 33 years from 1973 until his death in 2006. Their topicality was so timeless that the magazine repeated his cartoons long after his death. King Charles III of England, while serving as an officer in the Royal Navy in his youth and himself the subject of several of Tugg's sallies, noted in the foreword to a collection of Tugg's cartoons published by the Navy News: “If you have served in the Navy, then his cartoon characters are only too possible… He has the uncanny ability to invoke through his pen the kind of situations and personal characteristics that are so totally a part of the Royal Navy.”

His sense of humour was quickly recognised as a perfect way of getting flight safety messages across to the Fleet, with illustrations in Cockpit, the in-house Fleet Air Arm magazine and the magazine's annual calendar. Many of his humorous safety illustrations were later adapted for the oil platform and oil tanker industries.

Wilson's time afloat was spent entirely on aircraft carriers—HMS Ocean (R68), HMS Glory (R62), HMS Illustrious (87), HMS Victorious (R38) and HMS Eagle (R05).

In 1971 Wilson took early retirement from the Royal Navy as a Lieutenant to pursue a career as an artist and cartoonist.

== Post-Naval career ==
Following his retirement from the Royal Navy, Wilson submitted about twenty cartoons a week to tabloid newspapers and other publications, with successful outcomes that included acceptances by The Times, News of the World and Daily Mirror newspapers, and the magazine Punch. Many of the cartoons drawn in his latter years in civilian life remain accessible.

In 1996 he was awarded an MBE “for services to the Fleet Air Arm”.

Wilson's artistry and humour were also used by the North Sea oil and gas industry, illustrating safety manuals. The 2000 Management Report of the North of England P&I Association records that "During 1999 the Club ... bade farewell to Tugg Wilson, the illustrator of the Club’s trademark loss prevention calendars. The year 2000 calendar was Tugg’s last humorous poke at shipboard life before retiring."

== Death ==
Wilson died on 22 October 2006, aged 76. The December 2006 edition of Navy News contained a two-page spread mourning his death and containing exceptional tributes to his cartoon contributions over more than fifty years.

Retired Surgeon Captain Rick Jolly, the only serviceman to have been decorated by both sides after the Falklands War and author of Jackspeak, a comprehensive reference guide to the slang of the Royal Navy, said: "Wherever retired Royal Navy men and women were located, and wherever Navy News was read, by Flag Officers and ratings alike, his Jack cartoon strip was usually the first item turned to—and enjoyed with a wry smile as, once again, Tugg hit the button with his sharply-observed, beautifully-drafted and affectionate record of events in the life of the Royal Navy's greatest asset."

The First Sea Lord, Admiral Sir Jonathon Band, said: "Throughout my 40 years in the Royal Navy, a period dominated by continual change, one of the few constants that I have clung to (as have thousands of others), has been the fact that no matter how complicated, or strategically significant the issue, the cartoons and inclusive wit of Tugg have always managed to cut through the chaff and detail and home in on the impact and relevance to the individual sailor and marine. His cartoons have consistently ensured that the human elements of any matter have been brought fully to bear, opening the eyes of all in the command chain to the impact on people of decisions taken across the Fleet."

A memorial service was held in St Bartholomew's Church, Yeovilton on 8 June 2007. The service was followed by a fly-past of naval aircraft and helicopters.

== See also ==
- Willson, Cecil E A. "Births March 1930". freebmd.org.uk. ONS.
- @OnthisdayRN (22 October 2019). "in 2006 the legendary Fleet Air Arm cartoonist, Lt Cecil 'Tugg' Willson, died aged 76" (Tweet) – via Twitter.
- "Tugg can still draw a crowd" (PDF). Navy News (March 1997): 26.
