= Hugh Wilson =

Hugh Wilson may refer to:

- Hugh Wilson (Presbyterian minister) (1794–1868), American Presbyterian missionary and minister
- Hugh Irvine Wilson (1879–1925), golf course architect
- Hugh R. Wilson (1885–1946), United States Ambassador to Germany, 1938
- Hugh E. Wilson (1899–1962), American college football, baseball and basketball coach
- Hugh Wilson (Northern Ireland politician) (1905–1998), Independent Unionist supporter
- Hugh Wilson (RAF officer) (1908–1990), British Royal Air Force officer
- Hugh Wilson (director) (1943–2018), American film director, writer and television showrunner
- Hugh Wilson (New Zealand botanist) (born 1945), New Zealand botanist
- Hugh Wilson (American botanist) (1943–2018), professor at Texas A&M University
- Hugh Wilson (cricketer) (born 1958), English cricketer
- Hugh Wilson (football manager), worked for Alloa Athletic FC and Cowdenbeath FC
- Hughie Wilson (1869–1940), Scottish footballer
- Hugh Wilson (Scottish footballer) (1859–1946), Scottish international footballer
- Hugh Wilson (rugby union), Irish international rugby union player
- Geoffrey Wilson (British politician) (Hugh Geoffrey Birch Wilson, 1903–1975), British politician, member of parliament from Truro
