= Braden Wilson =

American football player (born 1989)

No. 40
- Position: Fullback

Personal information
- Born: October 9, 1989 (age 37); Smith Center, Kansas, U.S.
- Listed height: 6 ft 4 in (1.93 m)
- Listed weight: 251 lb (114 kg)

Career information
- High school: Smith Center (KS)
- College: Kansas State
- NFL draft: 2013: 6th round, 204th overall pick

Career history
- Kansas City Chiefs (2013)*
- * Offseason or practice squad member only
- Stats at Pro Football Reference

Braden Wilson (born October 9, 1989) is an American former football fullback. He played college football at Kansas State. He was selected by the Kansas City Chiefs in the sixth round of the 2013 NFL draft.

== Professional career ==
Wilson was selected in the sixth round with the 204th overall pick of the 2013 NFL draft by the Chiefs. On August 25, 2013, he was cut by the Chiefs.
