= Martin Wilson =

Martin Wilson may refer to:

- Martin Wilson, British musician formerly with the band Flux of Pink Indians
- Martin Wilson (artist), Australian artist
- Martin Wilson (director), Australian director of the 2022 film Pieces, nominated for the AACTA Award for Best Indie Film
- Martin Wilson (environmentalist) (1959–2022), New Zealand environmentalist and community leader
- Martin Wilson (writer) (born 1973), American writer

== See also ==
- Marty Wilson (disambiguation)
