= Ernie Wilson (English footballer) =

English footballer

Personal information
- Full name: Ernest Wilson
- Date of birth: 11 July 1899
- Place of birth: Beighton, England
- Date of death: 27 December 1955 (aged 56)
- Place of death: Hove, England
- Height: 5 ft 6 in (1.68 m)
- Position: Outside left

Senior career*
Years	Team	Apps	(Gls)
- Silverwood Colliery
- Beighton Recreation
19??–1922	Denaby United		
1922–1936	Brighton & Hove Albion	509	(67)
1936–19??	Vernon Athletic		
- * Club domestic league appearances and goals

Ernest Wilson (11 July 1899 – 27 December 1955), commonly known as Tug Wilson, was an English professional footballer who made more than 500 appearances in the Football League playing as an outside left for Brighton & Hove Albion.

== Life and career ==
Wilson was born in Beighton, Yorkshire, and went to school in nearby Swallownest. During the First World War, he worked at Silverwood Colliery, and played football for the colliery's works team, for Beighton Recreation, and for Midland League club Denaby United.

In 1922, after a trial, Wilson signed for Brighton & Hove Albion of the Football League Third Division South. He soon took over from Jimmy Jones at outside left, and was the undisputed first choice for the next twelve years. In 1935–36, he finally lost his place, to Bert Stephens, and retired from professional football at the end of the season. He had made 509 Football League appearances, 566 in all first-team competitions, which still remains a club record till this day.

He remained in Sussex, playing County League football for Vernon Athletic, and went into the bookmaking business with Frank Brett, a former teammate. Wilson died in Hove in 1955 at the age of 56.
