= Ron Wilson (CBC radio host) =

Canadian television journalist (born 1958)

Ron Wilson (born July 14, 1958 in Sioux Lookout, Ontario) is a radio and television host. He was the host of Edmonton AM, a local morning program heard weekdays on CBC Radio One's Edmonton, Alberta station, CBX. He is well known for his affinity for fine wines.

Ron Wilson's tenure as the host of Edmonton A.M. ended on January 7, 2011. He left to explore other opportunities at the CBC.

Before joining the CBC, Wilson was a sportscaster and news anchor for CJOH in Ottawa.
