= Marty Wilson =

Marty Wilson may refer to:

- Marty Wilson (poker player) (1957–2019), English professional poker player
- Marty Wilson (basketball) (born 1966), American college basketball coach
