= Tug Wilson (rugby) =

England international rugby union & league player (1938–1993)

- Full name: Kenneth James Wilson
- Born: 25 November 1938 Newark, England
- Died: 1 December 1993 (aged 55) Oldham, England

Rugby union career
- Position: Prop
Senior career
| Years | Team | Apps | (Points) |
| – | Gloucester | | |
International career
| Years | Team | Apps | (Points) |
| 1963 | England | 1 | (0) |
- Rugby league career

Playing information
- Position: Prop
Club
| Years | Team | Pld | T | G | FG | P |
|---|---|---|---|---|---|---|
| 1963–1973 | Oldham RLFC | 321 | | | | 87 |

Kenneth James "Tug" Wilson (25 November 1938 - 1 December 1993) was an English rugby union international.

Born in Newark, Wilson attended The King's School, Grantham.

Wilson, a physical training instructor at RAF Innsworth, was a RAF heavyweight boxing champion and once had a points win over Billy Walker. He played his rugby in the RAF and for Gloucester, gaining an England cap as a prop against France at Twickenham in the 1963 Five Nations, before signing with rugby league side Oldham. In his first season at Oldham, 1963–64, he was part of the team's Challenge Cup semi-final run. He played over 300 games for Oldham.

== See also ==
- List of England national rugby union players
