= Leigh Allison Wilson =

American author

- Born: October 23, 1957 (age 68); Rogersville, Tennessee, U.S.
- Occupations: Novelist, short story writer
- Writing career
- Notable awards: Flannery O'Connor Award

Leigh Allison Wilson (born October 23, 1957) is an American short story writer, and teacher. Her work has appeared in Harper's, Grand Street, and the Southern Review. Her story "Bullhead" was read on National Public Radio in 2008.

== Biography ==
Wilson was born in Rogersville, Tennessee. She graduated from Williams College, magna cum laude, studied at University of Virginia, and graduated from Iowa Writers' Workshop with an MFA. She resides in Oswego, New York, where she teaches at the State University of New York at Oswego. She teaches at University of Nebraska, Omaha. Wilson's first book of stories, From the Bottom Up, was published by Penguin Books and won the Flannery O'Connor Award from the University of Georgia Press.

== Awards ==
- Flannery O'Connor Award for From The Bottom Up
- Pulitzer Prize nominated for Wind
- James A. Michener Fellow of the Copernicus Society

== Works ==
- "Bullhead", flashquake, Fall 2004, Volume 4, Issue 1
- "Positional Vertigo", flashquake, Spring 2008, Volume 7 Issue 3
- From The Bottom Up. University of Georgia Press. 2008. ISBN 978-0-8203-3293-2.
- Wind stories. W. Morrow. 1989. ISBN 978-0-688-08111-9.
