= Welcome W. Wilson Jr. =

American businessman (born 1951)

- Born: 1951 (age 74–75)
- Education: University of Denver
- Children: 5

Welcome Wade Wilson Jr. (born 1951) is an American real estate developer and civic leader based in Houston, Texas. He serves as president and CEO of Welcome Group LLC, a commercial real estate investment and development firm operating across Texas and the Southeastern United States. Wilson has held leadership roles in higher education, economic development, historic preservation, and public policy organizations throughout Texas.

== Early life and education ==
Wilson was born in 1951 in Texas. He graduated from Kinkaid High School in 1969 and attended University of Denver in 1970.

== Career ==
Real estate development

Wilson began his career with Welcome Group LLC, a commercial real estate firm. He currently serves as president and CEO of the company. During Wilson's tenure, Welcome Group expanded its commercial real estate activities throughout Texas and the Southeastern United States.

He is also a joint venture partner in Kingham Dalton Wilson Ltd. (KDW), a design and construction affiliate of Welcome Group.

Wilson has held leadership and board positions with organizations including the Texas Higher Education Coordinating Board, Alamo Trust, Greater Houston Partnership, Texas Business Hall of Fame, Houston Food Bank, Southwest Houston Redevelopment Authority, and Remember the Alamo Foundation.

In 2018, Governor Greg Abbott appointed Wilson to the Texas Higher Education Coordinating Board.

Previously, Wilson served as vice chair of the University of Houston System Board of Regents, a gubernatorial appointment.

== Awards and recognition ==
In 2018, Wilson was named one of the “Most Admired CEOs” by the Houston Business Journal. His additional recognitions include the 2015 AJC Houston Human Relations Award, the 2013 Neighborhood Centers Inc. Alice Graham Baker Crusader Award, and the 2013 Chinese Community Center Community Impact Award.

== Personal life ==
Wilson is married and has five children.
