= June 1970 =

Month of 1970

<<	June 1970					>>
Su	Mo	Tu	We	Th	Fr	Sa
	1	2	3	4	5	6
7	8	9	10	11	12	13
14	15	16	17	18	19	20
21	22	23	24	25	26	27
28	29	30

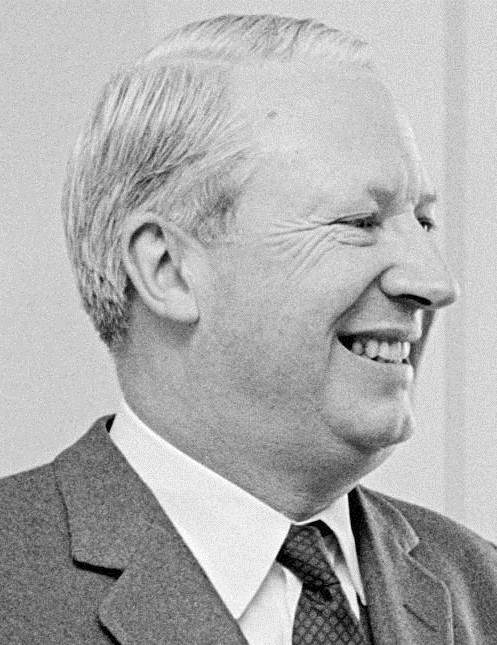
June 18, 1970: Edward Heath and the Conservative Party score upset win in United Kingdom elections

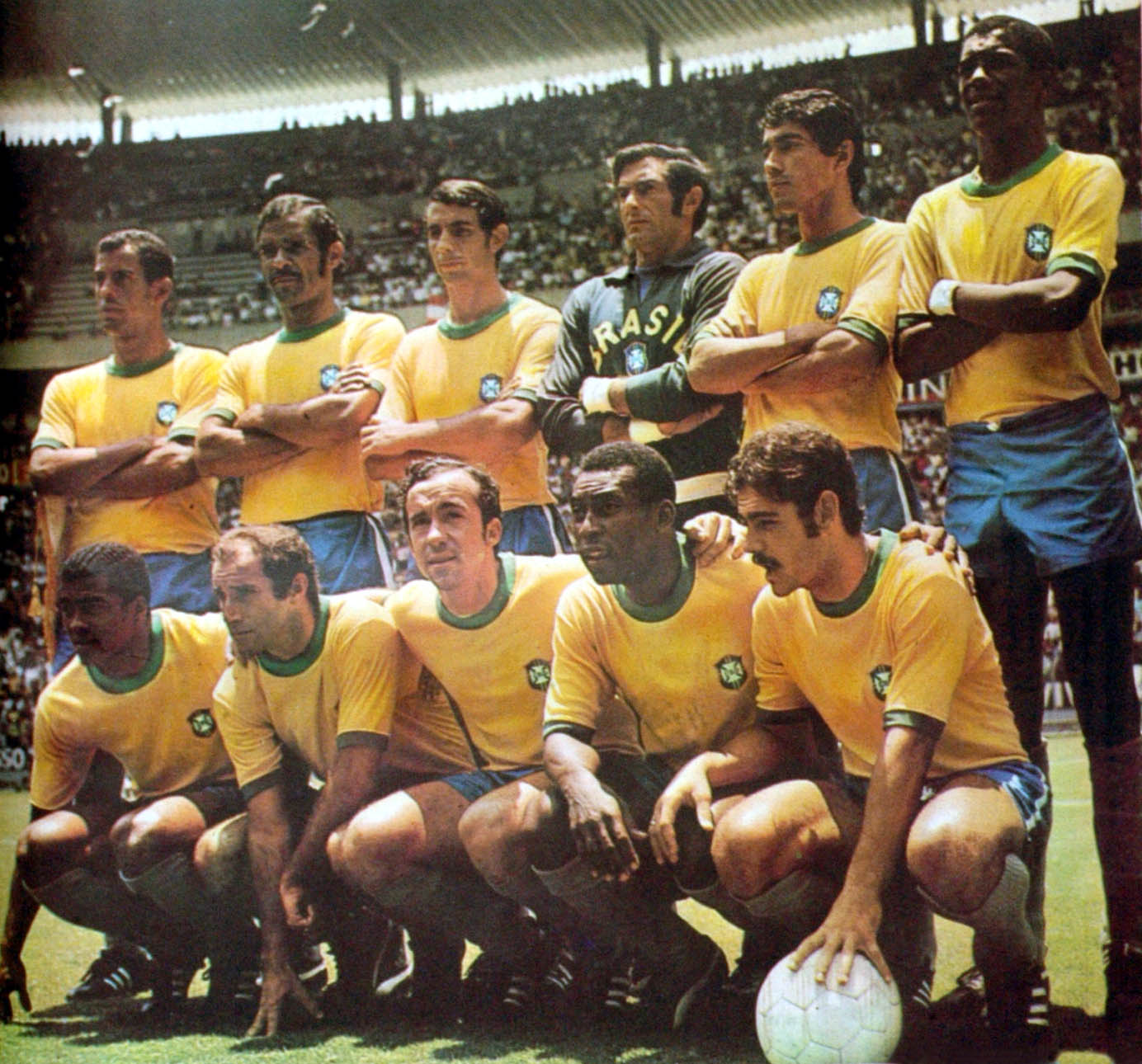
Brazil defeats Italy, 4–1, to win World Cup

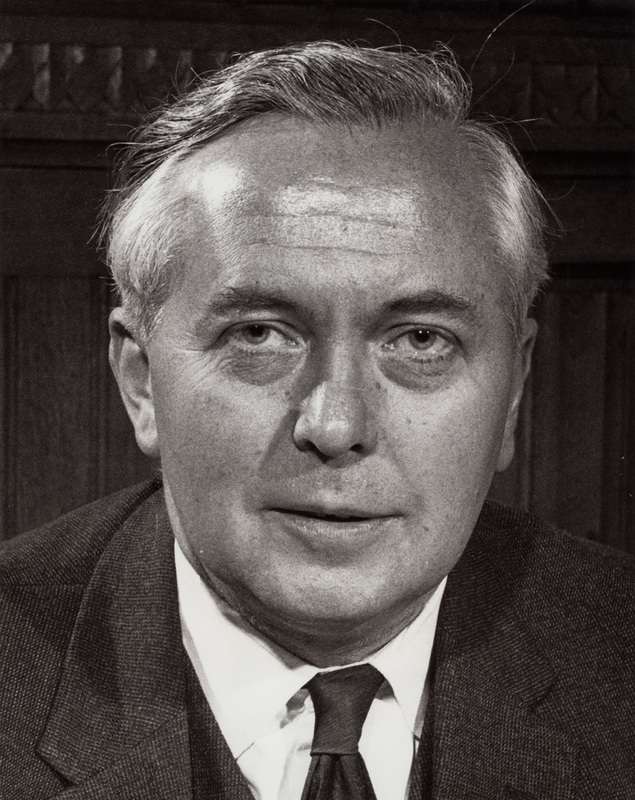
Prime Minister Harold Wilson and Labour Party voted out

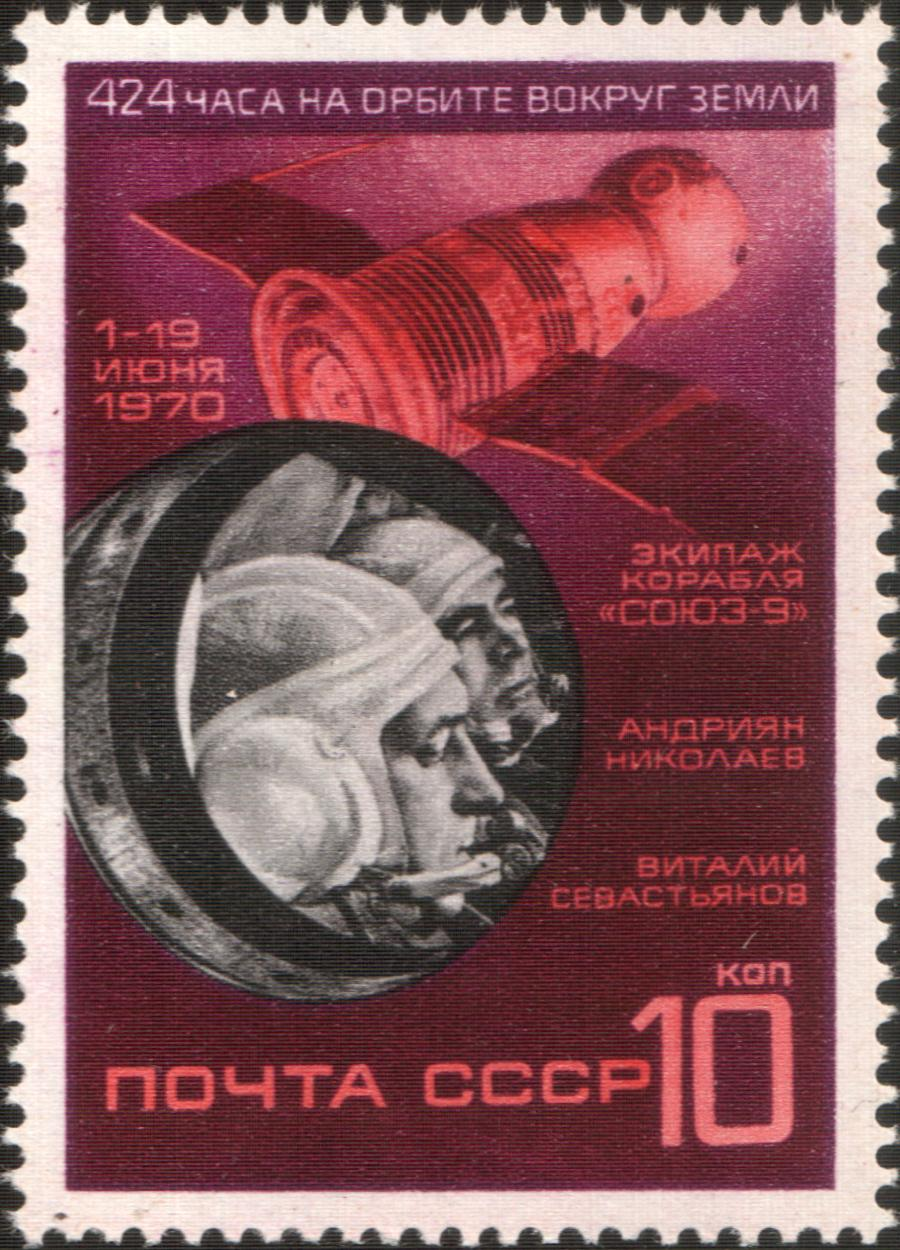
Soviet Soyuz 9 cosmonauts Nikolayev and Sevastyanov spend record 17½ days in orbit

The following events occurred in June 1970:

== June 1, 1970 (Monday) ==
- Soyuz 9, a two-man spacecraft with cosmonauts Andrian Nikolayev and Vitaly Sevastianov, was launched from the Soviet Union's Baikonur space center at 1:09 in the morning of June 2 (19:09 p.m. UTC).
- Born:
  - Alexi Lalas, American soccer player for the U.S. National team; in Birmingham, Michigan
  - Alison Hinds, Barbadian soca singer known as "The Queen of Soca"; born in London, England now residing in Barbados.
  - R. Madhavan (Raganathan Madhavan), Indian film actor and producer in Bollywood films and Tamil cinema; in Jamshedpur, Bihar state
- Died: Pedro Eugenio Aramburu, 67, former President of Argentina (1955–1958), was murdered in Buenos Aires, three days after being kidnapped from his apartment.

== June 2, 1970 (Tuesday) ==
- A team of scientists at the University of Wisconsin, led by Dr. H. Gobind Khorana, announced that they had synthesized the first artificial gene.
- Discovery of Western Europe's first large oil field, located offshore beneath Norway's section of the North Sea was announced by the Phillips Petroleum Company of the U.S., one of four companies in a consortium that had been drilling undersea." The other partners in the venture were AGIP of Italy, Petrofina of Belgium, and the Petronord Group of seven French companies and one from Norway. The Ekofisk oil field is 185 miles (298 km) from Norway and 200 miles (320 km) from Scotland.
- Born: B-Real (stage name for Louis Freese), American rapper and lead for the hip hop group Cypress Hill; in Los Angeles

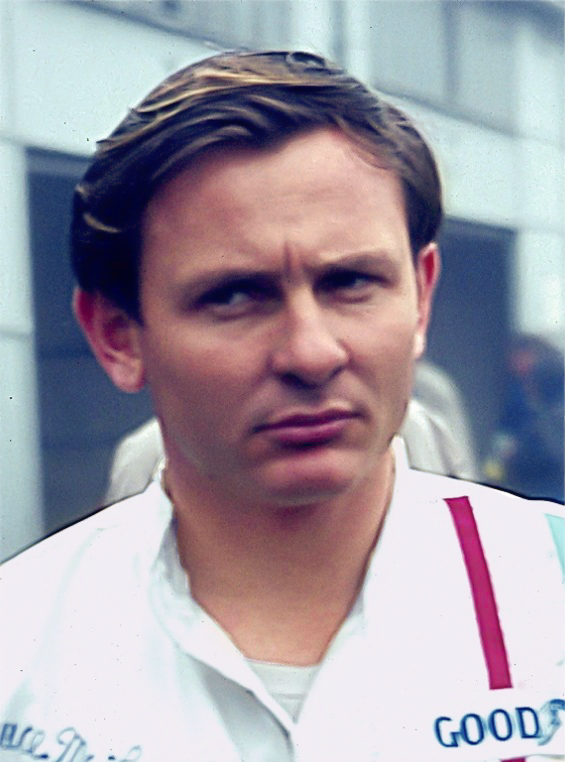
McLaren

- Died:
  - Bruce McLaren, 32, New Zealand race car engineer and driver, founder of the McLaren Group, was killed while testing the M8D, the fourth modification of his M8A series, at England's Goodwood Circuit, near Chichester, West Sussex
  - Orhan Kemal (pen name for Mehmet Raşit Öğütçü), 55, Turkish novelist
  - George Watkins, 69, American baseball player who had a record .373 batting average in his rookie season, but spent only six seasons in the major leagues

== June 3, 1970 (Wednesday) ==
- U.S. President Richard M. Nixon announced in a nationwide television and radio address that American troops would be pulled back out of Cambodia after the achievement of "all our major military objectives", and that half of the 31,000 U.S. troops in Cambodia had been returned to fight in South Vietnam.
- Died:
  - Hjalmar Schacht, 93, German politician and financier who served as President of the Reichsbank and as Adolf Hitler's Minister of Economics from 1935 to 1937 during Germany's dramatic recovery from the worldwide economic recession
  - Aníbal Milhais, 74, Portugal's most highly decorated soldier and national hero.
  - Ruth Sawyer, 89, American children's author and adult fiction novelist
  - R. K. Mellon, 70, American financier and philanthropist

== June 4, 1970 (Thursday) ==
Flag of Tonga

- The Kingdom of Tonga was granted independence from the United Kingdom, after 70 years as a British protectorate, with Tāufaʻāhau Tupou IV as King and his brother Fatafehi Tuʻipelehake as Prime Minister. Independence celebrations were held in the capital at Nukuʻalofa at a soccer field next to the royal palace, but attended by only 3,000 of the nation's 80,000 residents; most citizens on the island of Tongatapu were preparing instead for the arrival of 1,700 passengers from the ocean liner Oriana.
- The hijacking of a TWA Flight 486, and its 51 passengers, ended eight hours after it started, when police at Dulles International Airport in Washington persuaded Arthur G. Barkley to leave the plane. Three hours earlier, Barkley had been paid the first ransom ever given to an American hijacker when TWA provided him with $100,750 when the Boeing 727 flight from Phoenix to Washington landed at its intended destination of Dulles. Barkley was upset, however, to discover that he was not being provided the ransom of $100,000,000 he had demanded and forced the plane to take flight again. Barkley would later be found not guilty by reason of insanity, of crimes arising from the wounding of Flight 486's pilot, and the air piracy charges would be dropped when he was committed to a hospital for the criminally insane
- Born: Izabella Scorupco, Polish-born Swedish film actress known for GoldenEye; in Białystok
- Died: Menasha Skulnik, 80, American stage and radio comedian, known for his performances in Yiddish theater and as the recurring character "Uncle David" on The Goldbergs

== June 5, 1970 (Friday) ==
- U.S. President Richard M. Nixon held a meeting with the four chiefs of the American intelligence agencies (J. Edgar Hoover of the FBI, Richard Helms of the CIA, Noel Gayler of the NSA and Donald V. Bennett of the Defense Intelligence Agency) and prepared a plan for the "Huston Plan", a program to spy against, infiltrate, and make arrests of the members of, groups protesting against the Vietnam War Tom Charles Huston, a lower level member of the White House staff, delivered a detailed proposal on June 26, which President Nixon approved on July 14. The Huston plan, however, was abruptly canceled the next day before it could be implemented. Existence of the plan would later be revealed during testimony by Huston before U.S. Senate Armed Services Committee in 1973.

== June 6, 1970 (Saturday) ==
- Two masterpiece paintings, Paul Gauguin's "A Still Life of Apples and Grapes" and Pierre Bonnard's Les Deux Sauteuils ("The Two Chairs"), were stolen from the North London home of a British philanthropist Mathilda Marks-Kennedy, Sir Mark Kennedy, creating a mystery that would remain unsolved for the next 43 years. Sold for US$25 at a police auction in Turin in 1975 after being abandoned by the burglars in a railway station, the paintings would be found in 2014 in the home of an Italian auto worker who was unaware of their value. In 1970, the Gauguin was valued at £120,000 (US$228,000) and the Bonnard at £35,000 (US$84,000). By 2014, the worth of the Gauguin and the Bonnard works together would be valued at US$50,000,000. The good faith purchaser "known only as Nicolo", would be allowed to keep the Gauguin painting

== June 7, 1970 (Sunday) ==
- Rock music was performed for the first time at "The Met", New York's Metropolitan Opera House, when The Who performed their rock opera, Tommy.
- Voters in Switzerland rejected a proposed constitutional amendment to require non-citizens to leave the country. James Schwarzenbach, a member of the federal parliament who had gotten the proposal on the ballot, sought to stop what he called Überfremdung (Over-foreignization) of Switzerland. The vote was 645,588 against and 557,714 in favor of the proposal and brought a turnout of 74% of the nation's men.
- Voters in the western part of West Germany's state of Baden-Württemberg, overwhelmingly (82% to 18%) rejected a constitutional amendment that would have made Baden a separate state from Württemberg.
- Earl Anthony, who would later be the six-time national champion of the Professional Bowlers Association (PBA), won the first of 43 PBA Tour tournaments in a 14-year career. Rookie Anthony's first win came at the Heidelberg Open in Seattle.
- Born:
  - Ronaldo da Costa, Brazilian long-distance runner who held the world record for fastest marathon (2 hours, 6:05) for 11 months; in Descoberto, Minas Gerais state
  - Alexander Dobrindt, German politician, Federal Minister of the Interior, in Peißenberg
  - Dulmatin, Indonesian Muslim terrorist who planned the 2002 Bali bombings; as Djoko Pitono in Pemalang (killed in commando raid, 2010)
- Died:
  - E. M. Forster, 91, English novelist known for A Passage to India
  - Manuel Gómez-Moreno, 100, Spanish archaeologist

== June 8, 1970 (Monday) ==
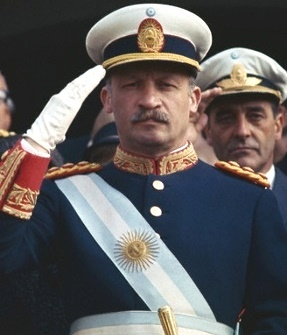
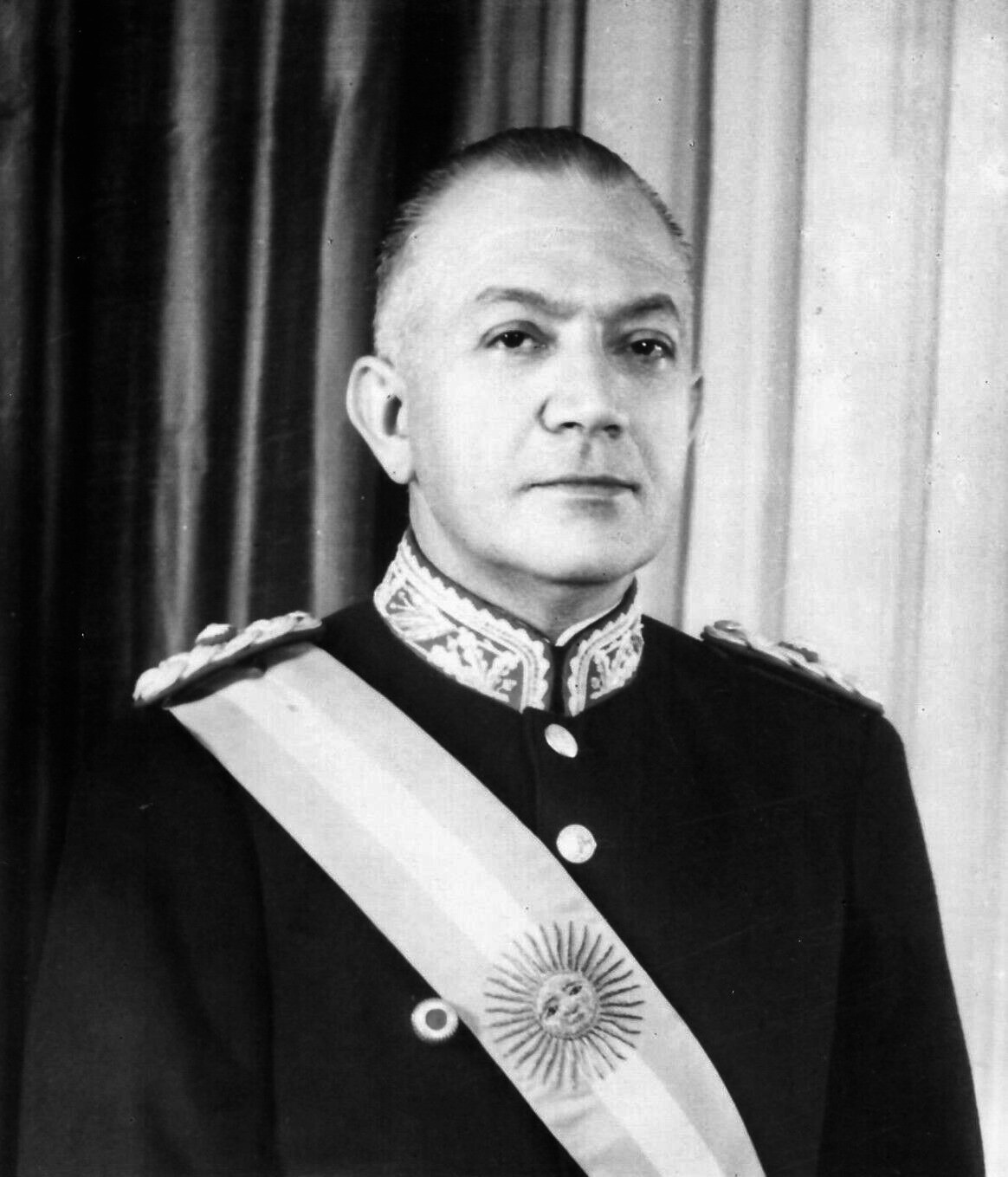
President Ongania and replacement, General Levingston
- Argentina's President Juan Carlos Ongania was overthrown in a military coup d'etat, after Ongania fired the commander-in-chief of the Argentine Army, Lieutenant General Alejandro Agustín Lanusse. As military units began seizing control of strategic points in Buenos Aires and the rest of the nation, Ongania barricaded himself inside the presidential offices at the Casa Rosada, protected by 1,200 members of his presidential guard. After 12 hours of negotiation, Ongania agreed to be driven, with police escort, to army headquarters where he submitted his resignation, then departed to the presidential residence at Quinta de Olivos. A three-man junta consisting of Lanusse, Admiral Pedro Gnavi and Air Force General Juan Carlos Rey, then advised the Argentine Supreme Court that they had assumed control of the executive branch and that they would name a president within ten days. On June 14, they designated General Roberto M. Levingston as the new president.
- Russian serial killer Boris Serebryakov, who had murdered nine victims over 14 months, was arrested in Kuybyshev, three days after he had killed a family of four. He would be executed by a single gunshot to the back of his head after a trial in 1971.
- Born:
  - Mike Modano, American NHL center and inductee into the Hockey Hall of Fame; in Livonia, Michigan
  - Gabby Giffords, U.S. Representative for Arizona from 2007 to 2012, known for being severely wounded in an assassination attempt in 2011; in Tucson, Arizona
  - Steve "Pearl" Renouf, celebrated Australian rugby league centre; in Murgon, Queensland
- Died: Abraham Maslow, 62, American psychologist known for formulating the theory of hierarchy of needs

== June 9, 1970 (Tuesday) ==
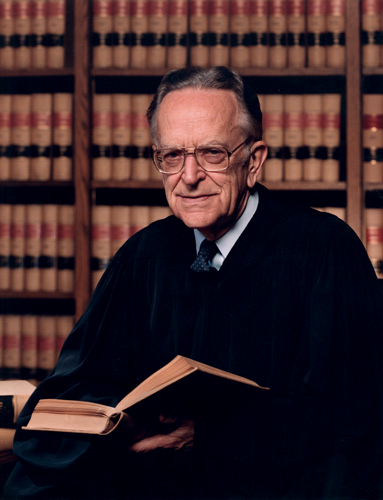
Blackmun

- The Supreme Court of the United States had nine members again after having operated with only eight for more than a year. Harry A. Blackmun, the third nominee for the vacancy, was sworn in as the new Associate Justice, 13 months after the resignation of Abe Fortas on May 15, 1969.
- Died: Rafael Ángel Calderón, 70, President of Costa Rica from 1940 to 1944

== June 10, 1970 (Wednesday) ==
- In Mozambique, at the time a southwest African colony of Portugal, the Portuguese Army launched Operation Gordian Knot, its counter-offensive against the nationalist guerrillas of FRELIMO (Frente de Libertação de Moçambique). Using 35,000 troops, the seven-month battle in the Portuguese Colonial War was partially successful in forcing the rebels to retreat, but FRELIMO forces ultimately regrouped after the operation ended. In 1975, after a change of government, Portuguese forces would withdraw from their overseas colonies, and Mozambique would be granted independence.
- Born:
  - Katsuhiro Harada, Japanese video game producer and developer of the Tekken series; in Osaka
  - Gerður Kristný, Icelandic author of children's books; in Reykjavík
  - Kelli Williams, American television actress, in Los Angeles
- Died: Bartolomé Blanche, 91, Chilean military officer who served as President of Chile for 19 days in 1932

== June 11, 1970 (Thursday) ==
- Anna Mae Hays and Elizabeth P. Hoisington of the U.S. Army were formally promoted to the rank of brigadier general, making them the first female generals in American history. General Hayes was the director of the Army Nurse Corps, and General Hoisington commanded the Women's Army Corps.
- Wheelus Air Base, the last American military unit in Libya, was turned over to the Libyan government as the last 47 U.S. troops in the North African nation withdrew. The base, located near Tripoli, was renamed Okba Ben Nafi Airfield and became the main base for the Libyan Air Force. In 1995, it would be converted to civilian use and renamed the Mitiga International Airport.
- Viet Cong troops attacked Thanh My hamlet, Phu Thanh village in Quang Nam Province near Da Nang and killed 70 of the 2,000 civilian residents in the Thanh My massacre. According to survivors, the attackers raced through the streets and shot bystanders, as well as throwing grenades into shelters and homes. Another 44 were killed in attacks outside of Ba Ren
- The Library of Tibetan Works and Archives was founded by the exiled 14th Dalai Lama in the city of Dharamshala in India's Himachal Pradesh, where most Tibetans had moved to after China's invasion of the Himalayan nation. The library now houses Tibetan Buddhist books, manuscripts and other items rescued by the Tibetans.
- The U.S. state of Louisiana voted to ratify the Nineteenth Amendment to the United States Constitution (granting women the right to vote) almost 50 years after the amendment had become effective nationwide. Louisiana had previously rejected the amendment on July 1, 1920. With the ratification, only two states had failed to ratify. North Carolina would approve on May 6, 1971, and Mississippi would finally vote to approve on March 22, 1984.
- Died:
  - Alexander Kerensky, 89, Prime Minister of Russia in 1917 after the overthrow of Tsar Nicholas II, until his own overthrow three months later by the Bolshevik revolution. Kerensky had lived in exile for more than 50 years and had lived in New York since 1961.
  - Frank Laubach, 85, American Christian missionary and activist for literacy
  - A. A. Allen, 59, American evangelist and reputed faith healer
  - Frank Silvera, 55, Jamaican-born American stage, film and TV actor, was accidentally electrocuted in his home
  - William Bentvena, 37, American mobster nicknamed "Billy Batts", member of the Gambino crime family of the American Mafia, was killed by Lucchese crime family associates Tommy DeSimone and James Burke, two weeks after Bentvena had insulted DeSimone.

== June 12, 1970 (Friday) ==
- Australia began its conversion to the metric system as assent was given to the Metric Conversion Act
- The city of Enerhodar, which now has a 47,000 population, was founded in the Ukrainian SSR (now Ukraine) to service the Zaporizhzhia Nuclear Power Plant in the Soviet Union
- Dock Ellis, a pitcher for baseball's Pittsburgh Pirates, threw the first no-hitter of the 1970 season while, he would claim later, he was high on the hallucinogenic drug LSD. In the 2 to 0 win in San Diego over the Padres, Ellis allowed eight walks On April 8, 1984, Ellis would claim that he had taken LSD six hours before the game because he hadn't realized that the Pirates were playing that day, let alone the starting pitcher. He said that he remembered little about the game other than a feeling of euphoria and that he was "zeroed in" on the catcher's glove
- At the 1970 U.S. Open golf championship at Hazeltine National Golf Club in Chaska, Minnesota, Dave Hill criticized the tournament's venue saying what it lacked- "Eighty acres of corn and a few cows. They ruined a good farm when they built this course."
- BC Andorra, the first and only professional basketball team of the tiny Principality of Andorra, was founded as Club de Basket Les Escaldes, adopting its present name of Bàsquet Club Andorra less than a year later.
- Died: William "Billy Bats" Bentvena, 49, convicted organized crime smuggler, was murdered three days after his release from federal prison. One of his associates in the Gambino crime family later wrote that Bentvena insulted Thomas DeSimone, a member of the rival Lucchese crime family and that DeSimone then carried out Bentvena's kidnapping and stabbing.

== June 13, 1970 (Saturday) ==
- U.S. President Nixon appointed nine people (five white, four African-Americans) to create the President's Commission on Campus Unrest, chaired by former Pennsylvania governor William Scranton, 41 days after the shootings at Kent State University and subsequent student demonstrations The Scranton Commission would release its report on September 26
- On the same day, Kent State University reopened its campus for the first time since the May 4 shootings so that 1,200 of the 1,900 graduates of the class of 1970 could receive their diplomas. The rest of the semester had been canceled after the deaths of four students. Under heavy security, the event was closed to everyone except for the 6,000 people invited, and state, city and campus police blocked all entrances to the campus to turn away anyone else. University President Robert I. White gave the commencement address, and all speakers were university employees.
- "The Long and Winding Road" became the Beatles' 20th and final single to reach number one on the U.S. Billboard Hot 100 chart in the magazine's June 13 rankings. Billboard's magazine and Top 40 had been released on June 6. The song would stay a second week at #1 before dropping to #4 and moving back down the charts. During their six-year recording career, the Beatles had averaged one #1 hit single every 3.7 months.
- Born:
  - Mikael Ljungberg, Swedish Greco-Roman wrestler, 2000 Olympic gold medalist and 1993 and 1995 world champion (committed suicide, 2004)
  - Coko (stage name for Cheryl Gamble, American R & B and gospel artist, lead singer of Sisters With Voices; in The Bronx, New York
  - Rivers Cuomo, American rock musician, lead vocalist for Weezer; in Manhattan, New York City
- Died: Gonzalo Roig, 79, Cuban musician, founder of the Cuban National Opera and co-founder of the Havana Symphony Orchestra

== June 14, 1970 (Sunday) ==
- Elections were held in the Soviet Union for the 767 member lower house (the Soviet of the Union) and the 750 member upper house (the Soviet of Nationalities). TASS, the Soviet news agency, reported a 99.92% turnout, with fewer than 65,000 of the 153 million eligible voters failing to appear The 1,517 candidates were all unopposed, and the only choice for voters was to vote yes or no. TASS praised the turnout as "vividly showing the unshakable unity of the Party and the people, a new victory of the bloc of Communists and non-party people."
- Died: Roman Ingarden, 77, Polish philosopher

== June 15, 1970 (Monday) ==
- Twelve dissidents made an unsuccessful attempt to escape from the Soviet Union in a scheme to hijack an airliner A report made six days later said that the 12 people were planning to board an Aeroflot plane from Smolny, which had a small airport near Leningrad. The group, Jewish residents who had been denied the right to emigrate from the U.S.S.R., had purchased tickets for all the seats on a scheduled flight to Priozersk in the Karelia region near the border with Finland. However, security police detained the group before they could board the plane. Mark Dymshits, a former Soviet Air Force pilot, had been prepared to fly the Antonov An-2 biplane to Sweden after making the two airplane's crew leave, and dissident writer Eduard Kuznetsov was the chief organizer of the plot. Dymshits and Kuznetsov would initially be sentenced to death, though their punishments would be reduced to 15 years in prison after international protests. The rest of the group received sentences ranging from four to 15 years.
- The first criminal trial of followers of Charles Manson, for the 1969 murders of actress Sharon Tate and six other people, opened against Manson and co-defendants Patricia Krenwinkel, Leslie Van Houten and Susan Atkins. Trial would last for seven months, with guilty verdicts returned against all four defendants on January 25, 1971.
- The Land of Oz, an American theme park based on the Wizard of Oz book series and film, opened at Beech Mountain, North Carolina. It would suffer serious damage from a fire in 1975, and close in 1980, but still reopens periodically for special events
- On Soyuz 9, Cosmonauts Andrian Nikolayev and Vitaly Sevastyanov broke the record for a stay in outer space by human beings at 14:35 UTC, surpassing the 13 days, 18 hours and 35 minutes mark set in 1965 by American astronauts Frank Borman and Jim Lovell on Gemini 7
- Born: Leah Remini, American TV actress; in Brooklyn, New York City
- Died: Sir John Noble Kennedy, 76, British Army officer, colonial Governor of Southern Rhodesia from 1947 to 1953

== June 16, 1970 (Tuesday) ==
- The leftist terrorist group Ação Libertadora Nacional released West Germany's ambassador to Brazil, Ehrenfried von Holleben, the day after the Brazilian government freed 40 political prisoners and five days after von Holleben had been kidnapped. Under the terms of the ransom, von Holleben would be freed only after the group received confirmation that the prisoners had landed safely in Algeria. Von Holleben, who was released unharmed the next day, had been kidnapped on June 11 by the leftist.

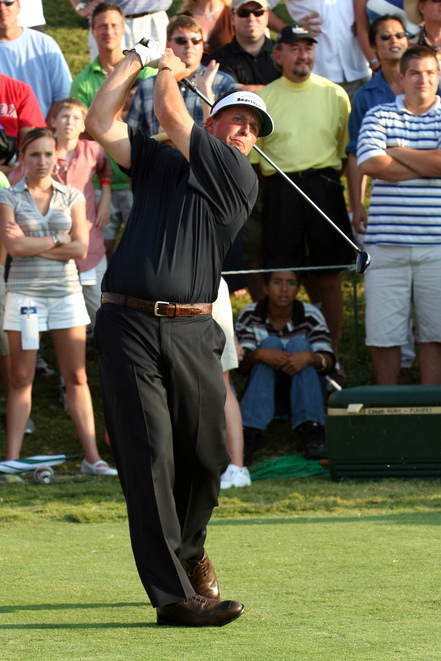
Phil Mickelson

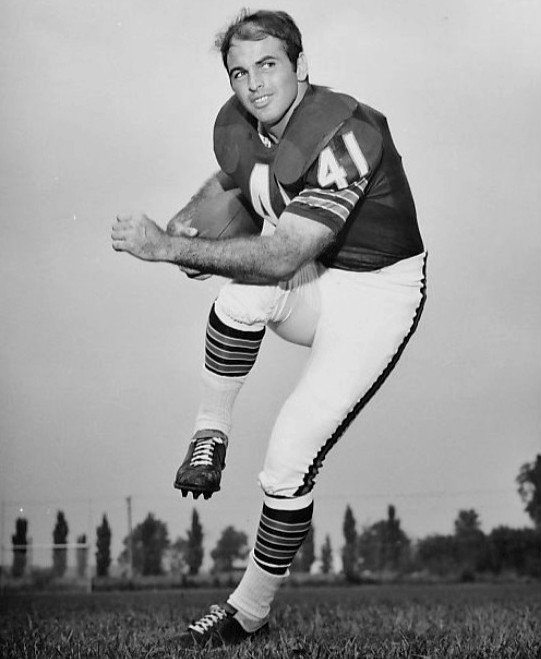
Brian Piccolo

- Structural engineer Kenneth A. Gibson overwhelmingly defeated incumbent Hugh J. Addonizio in the race for Mayor of Newark, New Jersey, becoming the first African-American to be elected as mayor of major east coast American city. Newark, at the time, had a population of almost 382,000 people. A few weeks after his July 1 departure from office, Adonizzio, already under criminal indictment at the time of the election, was found guilty of extortion in a jury trial and sentenced to 10 years in federal prison.
- Born: Phil Mickelson, American professional golfer, three-time winner of the Masters, as well as one PGA championship and the British Open; in San Diego
- Died:
  - Brian Piccolo, 26, American NFL running back from 1965 to 1969, died from cancer. Piccolo attained greater fame posthumously as the subject of the film Brian's Song
  - Charles P. McCormick, 74, American businessman who built the spice manufacturer McCormick & Company into a multi-billion dollar international conglomerate
  - Heino Eller, 83, Estonian-Soviet classical music composer
  - Hortense Powdermaker, 73, American anthropologist, ethnologist and educator

== June 17, 1970 (Wednesday) ==
- After protests by top-ranking Soviet scientists, the Soviet Union released geneticist Zhores Medvedev from confinement at the Kaluga psychiatric hospital, where he had been held as an alternative to imprisonment for his criticisms of the Soviet and Communist system. Medvedev had been arrested by the KGB on May 29 and then, in accordance with a Soviet practice at the time for prominent dissidents, sent to an insane asylum. His arrest had angered his fellow scientists to the extent that even highly decorated Soviets such as Andrei Sakharov and Pyotr Kapitsa joined author Alexander Solzhenitsyn in denouncing the Kremlin.
- A bill to lower the voting age for Americans from 21 to 18 passed Congress after the U.S. House of Representatives voted, 272 to 132, to join the U.S. Senate in amending the Voting Rights Act of 1965, effective January 1. Nixon signed the bill into law on June 22, but the relevant part of the amendment would be declared unconstitutional by the U.S. Supreme Court on December 21 in the case of Oregon v. Mitchell, in a finding that the federal government could only regulate national elections. The 26th Amendment to the U.S. Constitution would be ratified a little more than a year later in 1971 to lower the voting age in all elections.
- In Dallas, a three-judge panel of the United States District Court for the Northern District of Texas ruled unanimously in Roe v. Wade that the Texas law prohibiting abortion of any pregnancy (unless the mother's life was in danger) violated the Ninth Amendment of the United States Constitution. By that time, Norma McCorvey (identified in the caption as "Jane Roe" to protect her privacy) had already given birth and the child was adopted by another family. The U.S. Supreme Court decision in Roe v. Wade on January 22, 1973, would provide the right to an abortion nationwide.
- The residents of a trailer court in Clackamas County voted, 49 to 10, to incorporate as the city of Johnson City, Oregon. With an area of about 45 acres (18 ha), the town now has about 570 residents.
- Born: Will Forte, American comedian and actor; as Orville Willis Forte IV in Moraga, California
- Died: James H. Fields, 49, American Medal of Honor recipient

== June 18, 1970 (Thursday) ==
- In a surprise upset, voters in the United Kingdom gave the UK's Edward Heath and the Conservative Party a majority in the House of Commons, ending the leadership of the government by Prime Minister Harold Wilson and the rule by the Labour Party after nearly six years. Most opinion polls had predicted a third successive Labour win. The Labour Party had been so heavily favored that British bookmakers had set odds of 7 to 2 against the Conservatives winning control of Commons The Tories won 330 of the 630 seats in the Commons, gaining 77 while Labour lost 75 to win only 288 seats. Before the election, Labour had a 364 to 253 majority.
- Muhammad Bassiri, the Sahrawi leader of the fight for independence of the Spanish Sahara from Spain, was arrested by Spanish police and not seen again in public. Testimony from three Sahrawi witnesses later indicated that Bassiri was executed on July 29.
- Argentine Army Brigadier General Roberto M. Livingston was sworn in as the new President of Argentina, four days after being appointed by the three-man junta that had overthrown President Juan Carlos Ongania.

== June 19, 1970 (Friday) ==
- The Patent Cooperation Treaty was signed at Washington, DC, by representatives of 46 nations. It would enter into force as international law on January 24, 1978, providing a unified procedure for filing patent applications to protect inventions.
- Soyuz 9 returned to Earth at 6:59 p.m. local time (1259 UTC) at a site in the Kazakh SSR 47 miles (76 km) west of Karaganda. Cosmonauts Nikolayev and Sevastyanov returned after a then-record 17 days, 16 hours and 59 minutes in outer space
- Seven construction workers in Albert City, Iowa, were killed in the sudden collapse of a 130 ft (40 m) tall grain silo while they were pouring concrete to cover the steel structure. When the 12-man crew was almost done, the roof suddenly collapsed, sending eight of the men falling the equivalent of nine stories to the ground. The eighth victim was seriously injured.
- The first, and only championship of the seven-team International Boxing League (IBL), was won by the New York Jolts over the Chicago Clippers, 46 to 24, in Chicago The IBL scoring format was based on seven three-minute bouts at various weight classes, with points awarded for each round (one for a draw, two for a win) and four points for winning the bout.
- Born:
  - Brian Welch, American musician, guitarist of Korn; in Harbor City, Los Angeles, California
  - Quincy Watts, American track athlete and 1992 Olympic gold medalist; in Detroit
  - Thomas Oelsner, German paralympic Nordic skiing gold medalist in 1994 and 1998

== June 20, 1970 (Saturday) ==
- Dave Kunst and his brother John Kunst, along with a supply-carrying pack mule named "Willie Makeit", set off on foot from Waseca, Minnesota in an attempt to become the first people to walk around the world. John would be killed, and Dave would be wounded, by bandits while traveling through Afghanistan in 1972. After recovering from his injuries, Dave resumed the journey in 1973 from the spot where his travels had stopped and, on October 5, 1974, would complete the first verified "circumnavigation by foot" (he flew on commercial airlines to cross bodies of water), calculated to have been 14,452 miles (23,258 km).
- Born:
  - Athol Williams, South African poet and philosopher; in Lansdowne, Western Cape
  - Russell Garcia, British and English field hockey player and coach; in Portsmouth

== June 21, 1970 (Sunday) ==
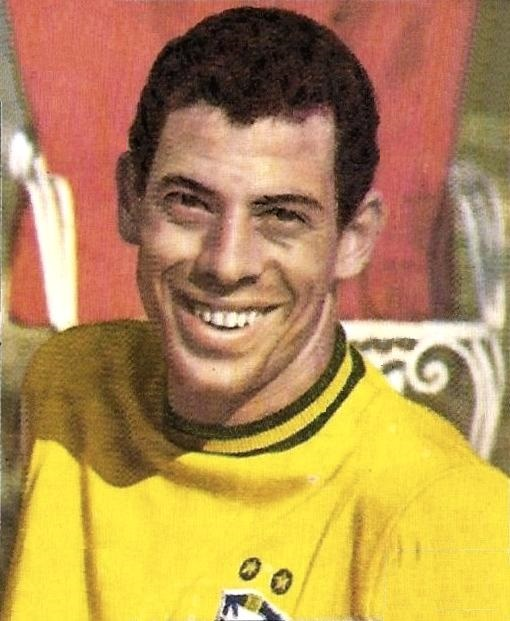
Brazil Team Captain Carlos Alberto

- Brazil defeated Italy, 4–1, to win the 1970 FIFA World Cup before a crowd of 112,000 in Mexico City's Azteca Stadium. Both nation's teams had won the World Cup twice— Brazil in 1958 and 1962, and Italy in 1934 and 1938, so the Jules Rimet Trophy, to be awarded permanently to the first three-time winner, was at stake.
- In the largest U.S. corporate bankruptcy, up to that date, the Penn Central Railroad filed a petition for Section 77 bankruptcy. The board of directors of Penn Central voted to file the petition after President Nixon withdrew a plan for a $200,000,000 guaranteed loan to the nation's largest railroad company in the face of opposition from Congress. U.S. District Judge William Kraft Jr. signed the order on the petition at his Philadelphia home at 5:35 in the afternoon, allowing the petition but permitting Penn Central to continue operating its scheduled rail service until bankruptcy trustees could be appointed.
- Four Franciscan friars who had been burned at the stake on orders of the Muslim Caliph of Jerusalem on November 14, 1391 in Jerusalem — Nicholas Tavelic, Deodatus of Aquitaine, Peter of Narbonne and Stephen of Cuneo— were canonized as Saints of the Roman Catholic Church by Pope Paul VI Tavelic was the first Croatian saint in Roman Catholicism.
- Ecuador's President, José María Velasco Ibarra, carried out an autogolpe two years into his elected term, dismissing the South American nation's legislature and supreme court, and assuming dictatorial powers. Ecuador's military leaders, who had supported the suspension of government, would remove him in a coup d'etat before the scheduled end of his term in 1972.
- Died: Sukarno, 69, the first President of Indonesia, from 1945 until being deposed and arrested in 1967. Sukarno, who reportedly had five of his wives by his bedside, was allowed to lay in state after his death, and tens of thousands of Indonesians passed by his body "for a last look at the once-fiery little man who led them to independence."

== June 22, 1970 (Monday) ==
- The United States Supreme Court ruled, 7 to 1, that the jury in a criminal trial no longer required the traditional 12 members, a custom that had dated to 14th Century England. In the majority opinion that declared Florida's proposal for a six-member jury to be acceptable under the U.S. Constitution, Justice Byron R. White wrote "The fact that the jury at common law was composed of precisely 12 is an historical accident, unnecessary to effect the purposes of the jury system and wholly without significance except to mystics." White also wrote that a state could set any number for a jury (besides 6 or 12) as long as the accused received the "common-sense judgment of a group of laymen".
- Died: Frank J. Wilson, 82, Chief of the United States Secret Service, 1936 to 1947

== June 23, 1970 (Tuesday) ==
- Prince Charles, heir apparent to the throne of the United Kingdom, received a Bachelor of Arts degree from Trinity College, Cambridge, becoming the first future British monarch to obtain a college diploma. The heir to the throne had been criticized as being unqualified to be accepted into Cambridge University, an institution with the highest academic standards, and surprised his detractors by earning a second-class division one degree
- Born: Zen Gesner, American TV actor known for the title role in The Adventures of Sinbad; in Van Nuys, California

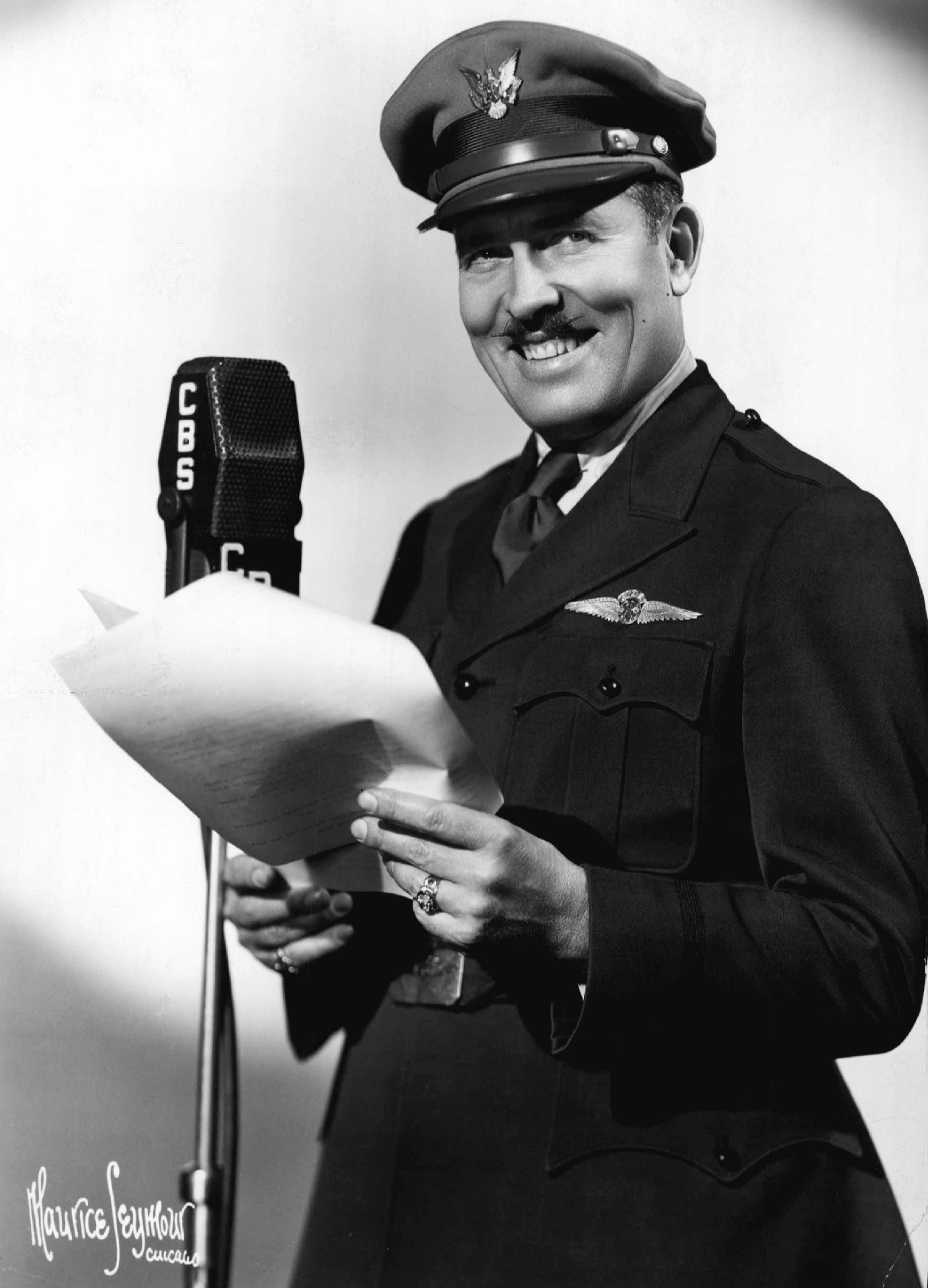
Roscoe Turner

- Died:
  - Roscoe Turner, 74, American aviator and airplane racing champion
  - Đặng Thùy Trâm, 27, medic for the North Vietnamese Army and for the Viet Cong whose diary, Last Night I Dreamed of Peace, would be published worldwide 35 years after she was shot during a U.S. Army raid

== June 24, 1970 (Wednesday) ==
- The United States Senate voted to repeal the Gulf of Tonkin Resolution that had supported U.S. intervention in the Vietnam War since 1964.

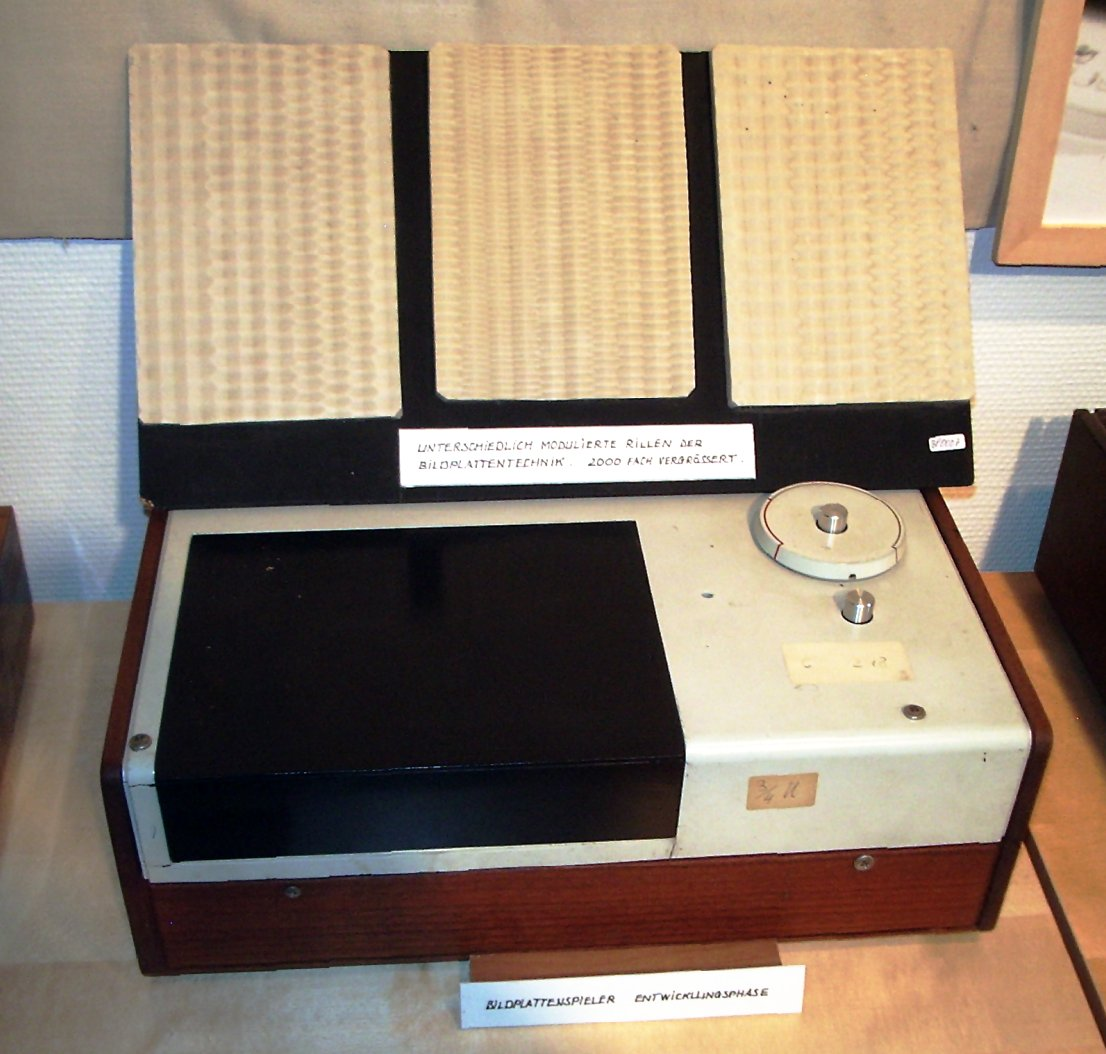
The Bildplattenspieler for TeD videodiscs

- The first videodisc, the Television Electronic Disc (TeD), was demonstrated at a press conference in West Berlin by Teldec, a joint venture of the West German electronics manufacturer AEG Telefunken and Britain's Decca Records. The 20 cm (7.9 in) flexible foil disc was capable of storing roughly five minutes of video programming, and would be upgraded to longer times by the time it went on sale on March 17, 1975.
- The National Communicable Disease Center (NCDC) was renamed the Center for Disease Control returning to the "CDC" abbreviation it had had from its 1946 founding until 1967. In 1992, after assuming its current name, the Centers for Disease Control and Prevention, it retained the CDC abbreviation.
- Born: Glenn Medeiros, American pop music singer and educator; in Lihue, Hawaii
- Died: Sawai Man Singh II, 57, Maharaja of Jaipur from 1922 to 1949, and titular ruler of the Jaipur state from 1949 onward. His son, Lieutenant Colonel Bhawani Singh, held the title for 18 months, until December 28, 1971, when the 26th Amendment to India's Constitution abolished all ceremonial rulers of the states of India

== June 25, 1970 (Thursday) ==
- Construction began on the first high-speed rail system in Europe, the Firenze—Roma direttisima. The 254 km (158 mi) line would open on February 24, 1977.
- The first residents moved into the Israeli settlement of Alon Shvut, the sixth on the occupied West Bank territory captured from Jordan and the largest up to that time. The settlement was built upon land formerly owned by the Palestinian Jordanian village of Khirbet Beit Zakariyyah.
- Born:
  - Pan Lingling, Singaporean film and TV actress; in Singapore
  - Roope Latvala, Finnish heavy metal guitarist; in Helsinki

== June 26, 1970 (Friday) ==
- Kingston Bridge over the River Clyde in Glasgow, now the busiest bridge in Europe, opened to traffic for Scotland's M8 motorway.
- An Alitalia DC-8 airliner, with 104 persons on board, was able to make a high speed emergency landing after one of its wings, a fuel tank and an engine were struck by a rocket fired during a clash between Israel and Syria at the Golan Heights. Giorgio Pizzo, the pilot on the flight from Tehran to Damascus, was able to make an emergency landing in Beirut and said that he hadn't realized that the jet had been hit by a rocket and that "When I got on the ground and saw the big hole underneath, then I knew we had a remarkable escape."
- Alexander Dubček, who had led the Communist Party of Czechoslovakia during its reforms in the Prague Spring, was expelled from the organization by vote of the Party's Central Committee
- Born:
  - Chris O'Donnell, American film and TV actor, in Winnetka, Illinois
  - Paweł Nastula, Polish judo champion and mixed martial artist, Olympic gold medalist (1996) and world judo championship medalist (1995 and 1997); in Warsaw
  - Sean Hayes, American comedian and Emmy Award-winning TV actor; in Chicago
  - Nick Offerman, American actor and comedian; in Joliet, Illinois
  - Paul Thomas Anderson, American filmmaker, in Los Angeles
- Died: Leopoldo Marechal, 70, Argentine novelist and poet

== June 27, 1970 (Saturday) ==
- The first Gay Pride march in history took place in Chicago, where 150 participants listened to speeches at Washington Square, then proceeded down Chicago Avenue, Michigan Avenue and Randolph Street to arrive at the Chicago Civic Center.
- The International Football Association Board (IFAB) voted to change the rules of soccer football, and adopted the shoot-out as a method of determining a winner in a game where the score was tied at the end of regulation time and extra time. Under the adopted rule, each team would be allowed up to five kicks, similar to penalty kicks, and the team with the best of five tries would be awarded the victory.
- Born:
  - Yumika Hayashi, Japanese adult video actress, in Tokyo (d. 2005)
  - Jim Edmonds, American baseball center fielder for 22 seasons; in Fullerton, California

== June 28, 1970 (Sunday) ==
- The day after the Gay Pride march in Chicago, a larger crowd, estimated between 10,000 and 20,000 or more, marched in New York City on the first anniversary of the Stonewall riots, going along a three-mile march from the Stonewall Inn in Greenwich Village, to Central Park. About 1,200 people in Los Angeles participated in a parade on Hollywood Boulevard.
- The final baseball game played at Forbes Field in Pittsburgh attracted 40,918 fans, the second-largest in team history, who watched the Pittsburgh Pirates defeat the Chicago Cubs in both games of a doubleheader, 3–2 and 4–1. In the first game in the park, on June 30, 1909, the Cubs had beaten the Pirates, 3–2.
- While vacationing with his family, 9-year-old Andrew Clark Hecht of Williamsville, New York, was scalded to death when he fell off a boardwalk into Crested Pool in the Old Faithful area of Yellowstone National Park. 8 pounds (3.6 kg) of his partial remains were recovered the following day. Hecht's parents would begin a campaign for safety in United States national parks, and Hecht's father would file a wrongful death lawsuit against the National Park Service, which was settled out of court for $20,000.
- Born:
  - Steve Burton, American soap opera actor on General Hospital; in Indianapolis
  - Mike White, American film screenwriter and actor; in Pasadena, California
  - Charles "The Bull" Shepherd, English boxer and former world super featherweight boxing champion; in Burnley, Lancashire

== June 29, 1970 (Monday) ==
- U.S. ground troops withdrew from Cambodia after two months. In all, 339 U.S. servicemen were killed in Cambodia during the unpopular 61-day incursion from South Vietnam.
- In Jersey City, New Jersey, former world heavyweight boxing champion Sonny Liston came back from a defeat and defeated Chuck Wepner when the referee stopped the bout because Wepner was severely bleeding. The victory would prove to be Liston's last fight, and he was found dead in his home a little more than six months later. Wepner, nicknamed "The Bayonne Bleeder" for his hometown of Bayonne, New Jersey, and his determination to keep fighting even after being cut, required more than 100 stitches to his face, and would later lose in a memorable bout in 1975 with world heavyweight boxing champion Muhammad Ali.
- Died:
  - Günther Messner, 34, Italian mountaineer, disappeared in the Pakistan Himalayan mountain range while descending Nanga Parbat, the ninth highest mountain in the world at 26,660 feet (8,130 m). Messner's remains would be located 35 years later, in 2005.
  - Caroline Thorpe, 32, wife of British Liberal Party leader Jeremy Thorpe, was killed when the car she was driving collided with a truck at Basingstoke. Mrs. Thorpe had been driving from the couple's home in North Devon to join her husband and their son in London.

== June 30, 1970 (Tuesday) ==
- Delegates to the Lutheran Church in America (LCA) convention approved a resolution allowing women to be ordained as ministers. The proposal was approved overwhelmingly by voice vote at the annual meeting in Minneapolis of the LCA, the largest of the three major Lutheran denominations in the United States
- Riverfront Stadium opened in Cincinnati as a dual-purpose stadium for the Cincinnati Reds baseball team and the Cincinnati Bengals NFL team. In the inaugural event, the Reds lost to the Atlanta Braves, 8 to 2. Six days earlier, the Reds had played their final game at Crosley Field, a 5 to 4 win over the San Francisco Giants.
- Born: Leonardo Sbaraglia, Argentine-born Spanish film actor; in Buenos Aires
- Died: Arthur Leslie (stage name for Arthur L.S. Broughton), 70, British actor and playwright
