= July 1970 =

Month of 1970

<<	July 1970					>>
Su	Mo	Tu	We	Th	Fr	Sa
			1	2	3	4
5	6	7	8	9	10	11
12	13	14	15	16	17	18
19	20	21	22	23	24	25
26	27	28	29	30	31

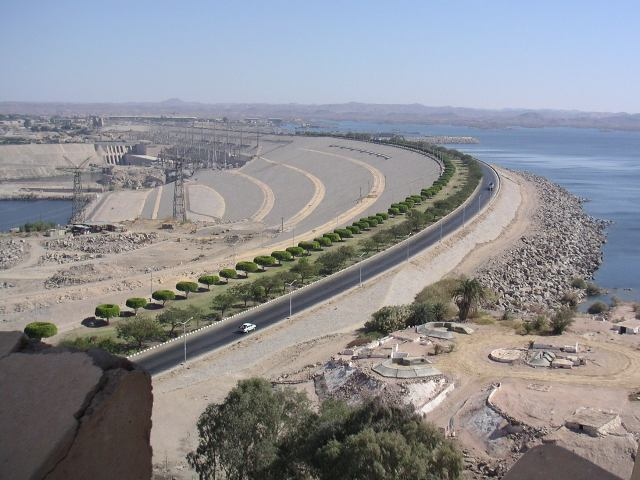
July 21, 1970: Aswan Dam finished in Egypt

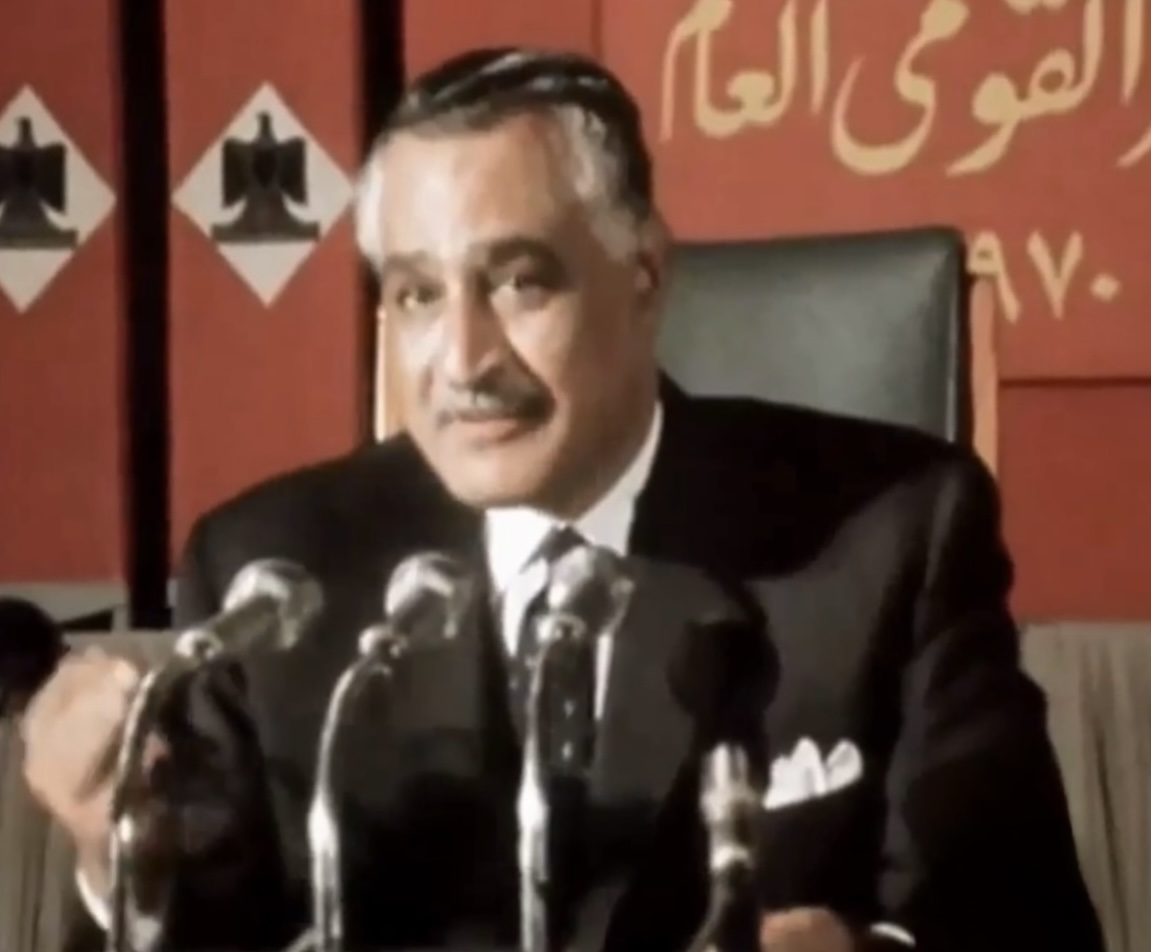
July 23, 1970: Egyptian President Gamal Abdel Nasser delivers his final public speech

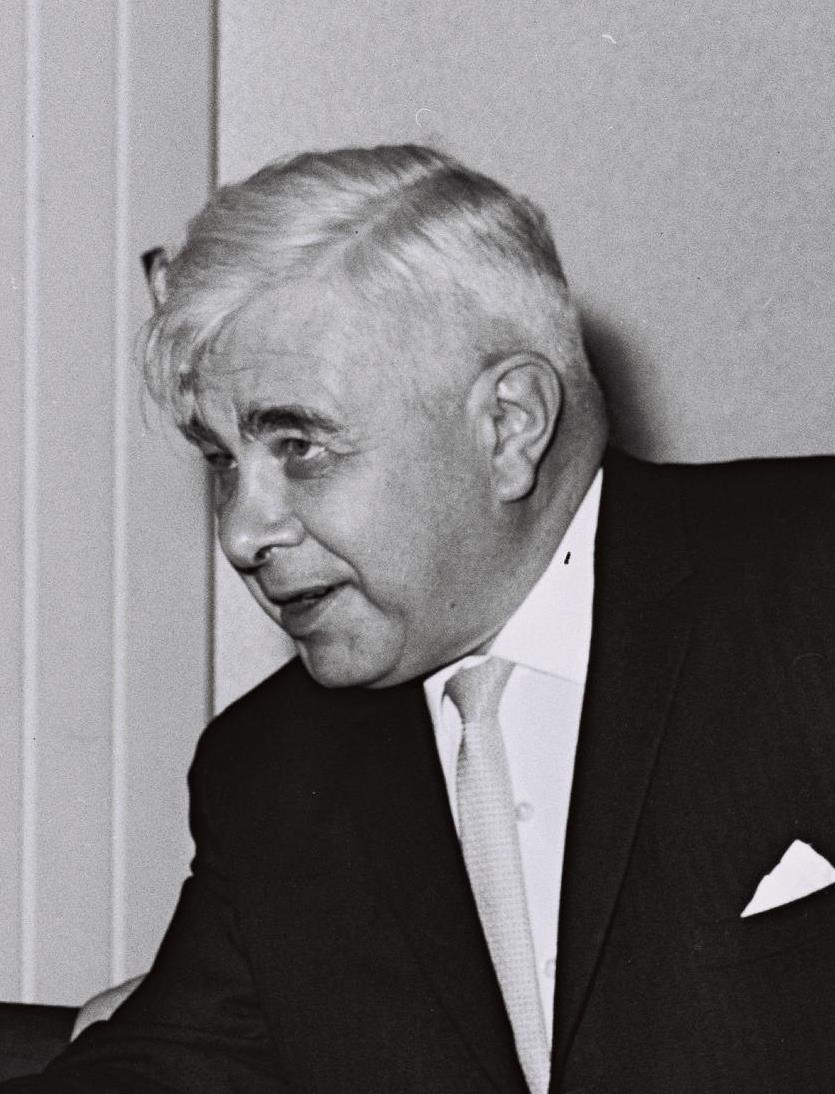
July 10, 1970: Iceland's Prime Minister Benediktsson killed in house fire

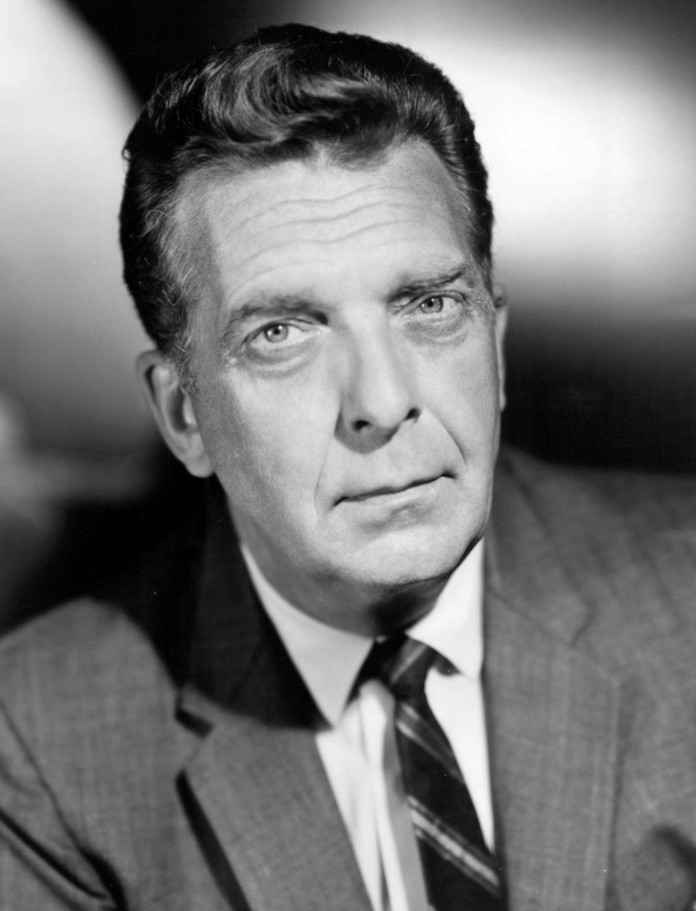
July 31, 1970: "Good night, Chet"; Huntley leaves NBC

The following events occurred in July 1970:

== July 1, 1970 (Wednesday) ==
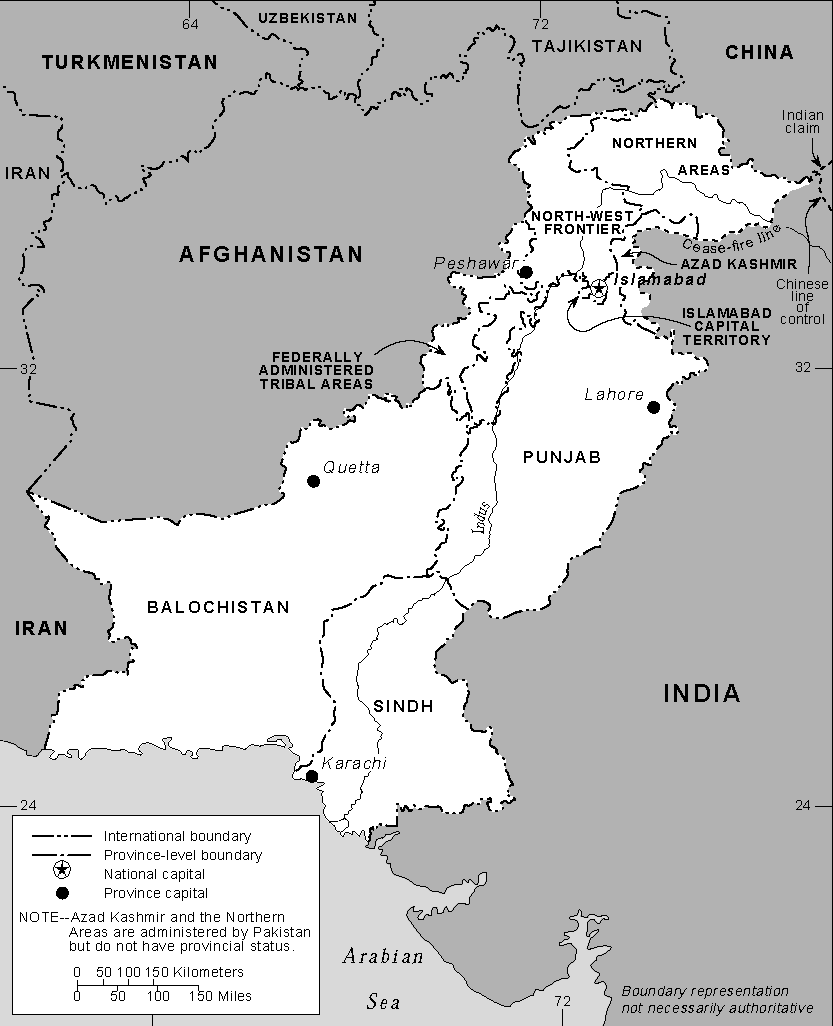
Pakistan reorganized

- The western section of Pakistan (at the time, a nation where west and east existed on either side of northern India), formerly the province of West Pakistan, was reorganized into four sub-national provinces, each with its own provincial government, a system that has been in effect for the nation of Pakistan ever since. President Yahya Khan had announced the division on November 28 and then ordered the transition on April 1 The four provinces created were Balochistan (southwest), the North-West Frontier Province (NFWP, now called Khyber Pakhtunkhwa) (northwest), Punjab (northeast) and Sindh (southeast). East Pakistan, which continued to be a single province, would secede less than a year later and become the nation of Bangladesh.
- Police in Rio de Janeiro rescued all 40 people on a hijacked jet airplane, after the four hijackers had threatened to kill passengers "one by one" if their demands to be flown to Cuba were not met. The jet had taken off from Rio on a multistop flight to Buenos Aires in Argentina, then landed back at Rio when the crew convinced the hijackers that the jet would have to refuel before its flight to Cuba. Upon arrival in Rio, local police flattened the jet's tires with machine gun fire.
- In a special Congressional election in California to fill the unexpired terms of two U.S. Representatives who had died in office, the voting public approved two Republican candidates who became, at the time, the only acknowledged members of the ultra-conservative John Birch Society to serve in the House. John G. Schmitz (who would run for president in 1972 for the American Independent Party) took the 35th District seat of James B. Utt, who had died of a heart attack on March 1. John H. Rousselot of the 24th District succeeded Glenard P. Lipscomb, who died of cancer on February 1.

== July 2, 1970 (Thursday) ==
- Conservative Party rule began in the House of Commons after Queen Elizabeth II addressed the Commons and the House of Lords for the traditional State Opening of Parliament. The Queen spoke on the plans of Edward Heath's government for reducing taxes, reforming relations between management and labor, curbing immigration and reducing the government's intervention in business affairs. Prime Minister Heath then addressed the Commons and said that he planned to lift the ban on the sale of weapons to South Africa.
- Born:
  - Derrick Adkins, American track athlete and 1996 Olympic gold medalist in 400m hurdles; in Brooklyn
  - Spice 1 (stage name for Robert Green, Jr.), American rap artist; in Hayward, California

== July 3, 1970 (Friday) ==
- All 112 people aboard Dan-Air Flight 1903 were killed when the airliner crashed into the side of a mountain at Arbucias on its approach to Barcelona. The De Havilland Comet had been chartered to take 105 passengers from northern England to Spain for a 13-day holiday vacation, and had departed Manchester earlier.
- The Falls curfew started in Northern Ireland as resistance to a weapons search operation by the British Army in a nationalist area of Belfast. The Provisional IRA and the official IRA also got involved.
- Born:
  - Scott Aukerman, American actor, comedian and podcast host, in Savannah, Georgia
  - Audra McDonald, American stage actress and six-time Tony Award winner; in West Berlin, West Germany
  - Teemu Selänne, ice hockey wingman known as "The Finnish Flash", who played 21 years in the NHL; in Helsinki

== July 4, 1970 (Saturday) ==
- The French Army detonated a 914 kiloton hydrogen bomb over its atmospheric test site at the Mururoa Atoll at 5:30 in the morning local time (19:30 on July 3 UTC) as part of a program to make a thermonuclear weapon small enough to be deliverable by a missile. Four previous tests had been made since June 15 of atomic bombs designed to trigger the thermonuclear reaction. The bomb was kept 1,800 feet (550 m) above the ocean by a balloon. France's Defense Minister, Michel Debre, watched the test from the deck of the French warship De Grasse from a distance of 30 miles (48 km)
- A crowd of 400,000 people gathered in front of the Washington Monument in Washington, D.C. for "Honor America Day", hosted by comedian Bob Hope and featuring other entertainers "to celebrate the nation's 194th birthday". The organizers— Hope, evangelist Billy Graham and Reader's Digest editor Hobart Lewis— promised in advance that they would keep the speeches and performances "scrupulously nonpolitical" attracted a smaller group of anti-war protesters, but remained relatively calm.
- A 19-year-old man was killed by two lions at the Portland Zoo in Oregon, after he and two companions broke into the zoo after closing time. Roger Adams sat at the edge of the 16 ft (4.9 m) deep lion pit, then lowered himself over the edge and fell the rest of the way when one of the lions knocked him down. Later in the early morning hours before the zoo reopened, an unknown person shot and killed the two lions, "Caesar" and "Sis" in an apparent retaliation for Adams's death

== July 5, 1970 (Sunday) ==
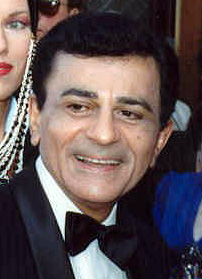
Casey Kasem

- The radio music countdown show American Top 40 made its debut, with Casey Kasem as host, playing the most recent list of Top 40 most popular songs as ranked by Billboard magazine. Initially, only 7 radio stations carried the syndicated program The first song introduced (the #40 seller for the week) was Marvin Gaye's recording of "The End of Our Road", and the first number one hit was "Mama Told Me Not to Come" by Three Dog Night
- All 109 people aboard Air Canada Flight 621 were killed as the Super DC-8 airliner crashed while on its approach to Toronto International Airport The jet had departed from Montreal on a multi-stop flight with a final scheduled destination of Los Angeles.
- Luis Echeverría Álvarez was elected President of Mexico by an overwhelming margin, and his party, the PRI (Partido Revolucionario Institucional) won all 60 of the seats in the Senate of Mexico and 178 of the 213 seats in the Chamber of Deputies. The PRI had ruled continuously since 1929. Echeverría had 86% of the vote against his opponent, Efraín González Morfín of the conservative PAN (Partido Acción Nacional) party.
- None of the five political parties in parliamentary elections in Cyprus received a majority although the Eniaion (Union) party won 15 of the 35 available seats. Under the Cypriot constitution, the unicameral parliament had 50 seats, with 35 for the Greek Cypriot legislators and 15 reserved for the island's Turkish Cypriot minority (which boycotted the legislative sessions). In all, 141 candidates ran for the 35 Greek Cypriot seats, and 110 candidates ran for the 15 Turkish Cypriot seats.
- Born: Mac Dre (stage name for Andre Hicks), American rapper; in Oakland, California (murdered 2004)

== July 6, 1970 (Monday) ==
- On the eve of a threatened nationwide labor union walkout in Italy, Prime Minister Mariano Rumor announced his resignation. The three Italian labor federations all announced that they would suspend the planned walkout based on Rumor's decision to step down. Five days later, President Giuseppe Saragat appointed Giulio Andreotti to become prime minister and to form a new government Andreotti would fail to form a coalition and after a little more than two weeks, Saragat would ask Emilio Colombo to attempt to form a government.
- Born: Martin Smith, English musician; Inspectah Deck, American rapper, producer and actor.
- Died: Marjorie Rambeau, 80, American film actress

== July 7, 1970 (Tuesday) ==
- U.S. President Richard Nixon invoked the Railway Labor Act to send striking rail employees back to work after the United Transportation Union (UTU) had started a walkout earlier in the day. Earlier in the day, rail workers had walked out on strike against the Baltimore & Ohio, the Louisville & Nashville, and the Southern Pacific railroads, and the railroad companies threatened a nationwide lockout of UTU members. Under the law invoked by President Nixon, a 30-day "cooling off" period took effect and an emergency board would hold hearings, recommend a settlement and send a report to the U.S. president. Under the law, no work stoppage would be allowed for 30 days after the report was delivered.
- Born:
  - Wayne McCullough, Northern Ireland professional boxer and WBC world bantamweight champion, 1995 to 1997; in Belfast
  - Atli Örvarsson, Icelandic film score composer; in Akureyri
- Died:
  - U.S. Army Major General George W. Casey Sr., 48, commander of the 1st Air Cavalry Division, was killed along with six other servicemen in South Vietnam when their Huey helicopter crashed into a mountain
  - Morris Markin, 76, Russian-born American taxicab manufacturer who founded the Checker Motors Corporation and was described as "the nation's smallest full-scale automaker... who built cars, mostly taxicabs, for durability rather than style".

== July 8, 1970 (Wednesday) ==
- In what an author described later as "the most dramatic reversal in the history of U.S. policy toward Indians", President Nixon sent a special message to Congress asking for legislation that would bring about "a new era in which the Indian future is determined by Indian acts and Indian decisions". Describing Native Americans as "the most deprived and most isolated minority group in our nation", President Nixon proposed a nine-point program The proposal also reversed the longstanding "Termination of Tribes" policy of the United States Bureau of Indian Affairs for the cultural assimilation of smaller tribes of American Indians into mainstream society for purposes of reducing federal aid to the tribes as a whole. "Self-determination among the Indian people can and must be encouraged without the threat of eventual termination," he wrote in his message.
- Twenty-five American judges agreed to spend a night in the Nevada State Prison in Carson City under the same conditions as the inmates, in the first experiment of its kind. The activity was sponsored by the University of Nevada, Reno, through a seminar of the National College of State Trial Judges (now the National Judicial College). Most of the judges shared a cell with minimum security prisoners, while some were placed in "the hole" (a holding cell) in solitary confinement. Upon walking out of the penitentiary the next day, the judges were in agreement that the conditions in U.S. prisons were shocking, and that prison reform was necessary.
- New World Pictures was founded by brothers Roger Corman and Gene Corman, initially as a producer and distributor of low budget, R-rated films. Its first release was Angels Die Hard, starring Tom Baker and William Smith, followed by The Student Nurses. In later years, New World Pictures would produce popular television programs.
- Born: Beck, a/k/a Beck Hansen (stage name for Bek David Campbell), American singer; in Los Angeles

== July 9, 1970 (Thursday) ==
  EPA and NOAA
- U.S. President Richard Nixon proposed that Congress create the United States Environmental Protection Agency (EPA) and the National Oceanic and Atmospheric Administration (NOAA). In his message to Congress, Nixon said that the changes would fulfill federal government commitment to "the rescue of our natural environment, and the preservation of the earth as a place both habitable by and hospitable to man". NOAA would begin operations on October 3 as a unit of the U.S. Department of Commerce, and the EPA would open as an independent agency on December 2.
- The Defense Distinguished Service Medal, the highest non-combat military award, was created to honor performance of duty in contributing to the defense of the United States or to national security. U.S. Army General Earle Wheeler, the retiring Chairman of the Joint Chiefs of Staff, received the first medal that day.
- In Italy, a team of women soccer football players representing Denmark won the first Coppa del Mondo, the original women's intercontinental football tournament, defeating Italy, 2 to 0, in the final, held before 40,000 fans at the Stadio Communale in Turin. The tournament had six European teams (Denmark, Italy, England, Austria, West Germany, Switzerland) and Mexico.
- In major league baseball's first identified "Grand Slam Single", Detroit Tigers batter Dalton Jones hit the ball past all of the Boston Red Sox outfielders with the bases loaded, but was only credited with three runs batted in and was called out when he reached second base. Although the hit into right field stands would normally have been an automatic home run, Jones hurried past first base and ended up passing his teammate, Don Wert, who was jogging to second base. Jones was then called out for passing a runner, and his three teammates scored. Detroit won the game, 7 to 3. The play is only known to have happened two more times, in 1976 and in 1999.
- Born: Trent Green, American NFL quarterback 1993 to 2008 and TV sports analyst; in Cedar Rapids, Iowa
- Died: Félix Gaillard, 50, Prime Minister of France from 1957 to 1958, was drowned in the English Channel after his yacht, the Marie Grillon, wrecked on the Minquiers reefs in the Channel Islands. Gaillard and two passengers had been visiting a relative on the island of Jersey and were on their way back to the French mainland.

== July 10, 1970 (Friday) ==
- Bjarni Benediktsson, the Prime Minister of Iceland since 1963, died in a fire in his summer residence at Thingvellir National Park. By the time firefighters arrived, an hour after a neighbor had called in the alarm, the cottage had burned to the ground. Killed along with the 63-year old premier were his wife, Sigridur, and his four-year-old grandson. Jóhann Hafstein, Benediktsson's Minister of Justice and Minister of Industry, was selected as the new leader of the Independence Party and became the new Prime Minister.
- Bishop James Edward Walsh was allowed to leave the People's Republic of China after 12 years imprisonment, and walked across a footbridge into Hong Kong. Walsh, a Roman Catholic priest, had been arrested in 1958 and sentenced to 20 years imprisonment. In a statement, the PRC's Xinhua News Agency said that Walsh had been released because of "old age and ill health" and added that "the culprit confessed his crimes while serving his term". Walsh said that the Chinese had been "very polite" to him during his dozen years imprisonment, and that he had been incarcerated with two English-speaking inmates.
- Private "whites only" schools, opened in the U.S. in the early 1960s throughout the Deep South as a response to racial integration of public schools, lost their tax exemption in a policy change announced by the Internal Revenue Service (IRS). At the time of the IRS decision, there were about 10,000 such private schools, ranging from kindergartens to colleges, that restricted their admission policies to Caucasian students. The IRS ruled that racially segregated schools were not "charitable institutions" and were not entitled to avoid payment of income taxes, effectively bringing an end to most of the white private schools. Schools affected could become tax-exempt only by announcing a nondiscriminatory policy or by showing proof of a multiracial student body. In Mississippi, an official of the "Citizens Council School Foundation" called the loss of exemption "politics at its wickedest at the expense of schoolchildren" and described it as "disturbing" because it made race "a factor in tax exemption".
- Born: John Simm, English stage actor; in Leeds, West Yorkshire

== July 11, 1970 (Saturday) ==
- An Athena V-123-D missile, launched by the U.S. Air Force, veered off course from the Green River Launch Complex in Utah, and impacted 180 miles (290 km) south of the border between the U.S. and Mexico. Although the missile was reported in the press release to be unarmed, it was actually a salted bomb, carrying two vials of radioactive cobalt-57. It contaminated a large area in the Chihuahuan Desert near Mapimí in Mexico's Durango state, requiring years of cleanup.
- In one of the largest parimutuel betting wins up to that time (by amount returned on investment), a New Zealand contractor won NZD $482,687 (US$431,000) from the jackpot at Matamata by being the only person to pick all four winners on a quadrella jackpot wager The win, by Te Aroha resident Peter Moran, would be the equivalent of 2.8 million U.S. dollars in 2019 or 4.2 million New Zealand dollars in 2019.
- Born: Justin Chambers, American TV soap opera actor; in Springfield, Ohio
- Died: André Lurçat, 75, French modernist architect

== July 12, 1970 (Sunday) ==
- Thor Heyerdahl's papyrus boat Ra II arrived in Barbados, bringing an end to its 3,200 mi (5,100 km) journey across the Atlantic Ocean. Heyerdahl had set out to prove that the ancient Egyptians could have crossed the ocean 3,500 years before the voyage of Christopher Columbus, and had departed Morocco on May 17 with a crew of seven. The Ra II had become waterlogged as it approached Barbados and was towed the last eight miles by a Barbadian tugboat, the Culpepper.
- Jack Nicklaus won the British Open in an 18-hole playoff against Doug Sanders at St. Andrews in Scotland. Both had tied at 283 after 72 holes when Sanders had missed a three-foot putt on the 18th hole In the playoff Nicklaus sank a 7-foot putt on the same hole for a 72 to 73 win.
- Born:
  - Lee Byung-hun, South Korean film actor in South Korean and American movies; in Seoul
  - Viétia Zangrandi, Brazilian TV actress; in Aracaju, Sergipe state
  - Jaason Simmons, Australian television actor best known for the American Baywatch TV series; in Hobart, Tasmania
- Died: L. Wolfe Gilbert, 83, Ukrainian-born American songwriter

== July 13, 1970 (Monday) ==
- Fourteen residents of the Indian city of Jamnagar were killed, and 63 injured, when an Indian Air Force (IAF) jet crashed into their neighborhood The pilot was flying on a training mission over the city in Gujarat state when the plane caught fire, and was killed as well when the jet crashed into a motor garage and set fire to homes and businesses within a 250 yd (230 m) radius.
- "Orange Day" parades, organized by Northern Ireland's Protestant Orange Order took place peacefully in Belfast and in 18 other towns in the United Kingdom's six Northern Ireland counties, with 100,000 participants. The Belfast event attracted 40,000 marchers demonstrating in favor of keeping predominantly Protestant Northern Ireland separate from the mostly Catholic Republic of Ireland. A security force of 20,000 British Army troops and local police maintained order, and only three arrests of Catholic opponents were reported. The celebrations, normally held on July 12 to commemorate the 1690 Battle of the Boyne, were postponed one day because the 12th fell on a Sunday.
- The Technical University of Kaiserslautern was established in West Germany
- Born: Bruno Salomone, French comedian and actor best known for the TV series Fais pas ci, fais pas ça; in Villeneuve-Saint-Georges
- Died:
  - Lt. General Leslie Groves, Jr., 73, U.S. Army engineer who directed the Manhattan Project
  - Roger Edens, 64, American film score composer
  - General Sheng Shih-ts'ai, 74, Chinese warlord and Military Governor of Sinkiang province (now Xinjiang) from 1933 to 1944

== July 14, 1970 (Tuesday) ==
- In the first meeting of the Soviet Union's bicameral legislature, the Supreme Soviet, the chairmen of both houses were replaced without explanation. Ivan Spiridonov, Chairman of the 767-member Council of the Union was removed in favor of Alexei P. Shitikov, a party chief in Khabarovsk. Justas Paleckis, a former Lithuanian SSR executive, was removed as Chairman of the Council of Nationalities. Taking his place was Yodgor Nasriddinova, the 49-year-old executive of the Uzbek SSR and the first woman and first Uzbek to become leader of either house
- At Riverfront Stadium, the National League wins its eighth straight Major League Baseball All-Star Game, a 12-inning 5–4 victory. Pete Rose crashes into Cleveland Indians catcher Ray Fosse to score the winning run on Jim Hickman's single. Claude Osteen pitches the 10th for the win, and Carl Yastrzemski of the Boston Red Sox captures the MVP trophy for the American League.
- Died: Luis Mariano, 55, Spanish-born tenor in French opera and film

== July 15, 1970 (Wednesday) ==
- The United Kingdom's 47,000 longshoremen walked out on strike at the end of the day shift, tying up Great Britain's 40 major ports for the first time since 1926. Queen Elizabeth II proclaimed a state of emergency the next morning as dockworkers refused to load or unload nearly 100 ships already in harbour. The longshoremen returned to work on August 3 after delegates of the Transport and General Workers Union voted on July 29 to accept a compromise brokered by a court of inquiry, approving it 51 to 31.
- Seven schoolchildren were killed, and 42 injured, in a bus crash while on a field trip from summer classes at the Hillel School in Lawrence, New York The chartered bus, carrying 49 children and ten adults, skidded off of an interstate highway near New Smithville, Pennsylvania and plunged down a 50-foot embankment. The group had been on their way to an overnight trip to Hershey, Pennsylvania, when the accident occurred. Guardrails that would normally have stopped the bus had been knocked down in a previous accident and had not been replaced.
- Died: Frits Lugt, 86, Dutch art curator and expert on Rembrandt van Rijn

== July 16, 1970 (Thursday) ==
- The Benevolent and Protective Order of Elks, an all-white national fraternal organization commonly referred to as "The Elks Club", and with lodges across the United States, voted overwhelmingly to continue its prohibition against non-white members, with only 22 in favor and 1,550 against changing its constitution (which required that members had to be white U.S. citizens at least 21 years old, believers in God, and with no prior membership in a subversive organization). The vote, conducted by members raising their hands, took place at the closing ceremonies of the Elks national lodge meeting in San Francisco. In 1971 and 1972, the members would vote against allowing African-Americans and other non-whites, before finally electing in 1973 to remove the prohibition.
- Three Rivers Stadium in Pittsburgh opened as 46,846 paying customers watched the Pittsburgh Pirates lose to the Cincinnati Reds, 3 to 2

== July 17, 1970 (Friday) ==
- The body of former President of Argentina Pedro Eugenio Aramburu was found in a five-foot deep grave in the basement of a farmhouse in the village of Timote, in the Buenos Aires Province, about 240 miles (390 km) from Buenos Aires, where Aramburu had been kidnapped by the Montoneros terrorist group on May 29. Aramburu, who had been president from 1955 to 1958, had been executed by his captors with two gunshots to the chest
- The United States and Mexico signed a treaty of cooperation for the return of stolen archaeological, historical and cultural properties
- Born:
  - Jang Hyun-sung, South Korean film and TV actor; in Geoje, South Gyeongsang Province
  - Gavin McInnes, English-born Canadian writer, journalist, and far-right political commentator, founder of the Proud Boys; in Hitchin, Hertfordshire
  - Gary Gulman, American comedian and late night talk show personality; in Peabody, Massachusetts

== July 18, 1970 (Saturday) ==
- All 23 people on board a Soviet plane, carrying relief supplies for victims of the May earthquake in Peru, were killed when the Antonov An-22 cargo plane crashed into the North Atlantic Ocean after its departure from Iceland. The aircraft would be the object of a multinational search, until debris were located by a Russian trawler on July 26
- San Francisco Giants center fielder Willie Mays got his 3,000th hit. At the time he was only the tenth player to collect 3,000 hits. There are now 33 players in the 3,000 hit club.
- Born: Gruff Rhys, Welsh musician; in Haverfordwest, Pembrokeshire

== July 19, 1970 (Sunday) ==
- MS Ancerville, a French cruise ship, safely rescued all 448 passengers and 273 crew of the cruise ship MS Fulvia after the Fulvia was destroyed by fire in the Atlantic Ocean. The ship sank the next day in 12,000 ft (3,700 m) deep waters
- Died: Panagiotis Pipinelis, 71, interim Prime Minister of Greece for three months in 1963, later Minister of Foreign Affaires during the military dictatorship

== July 20, 1970 (Monday) ==
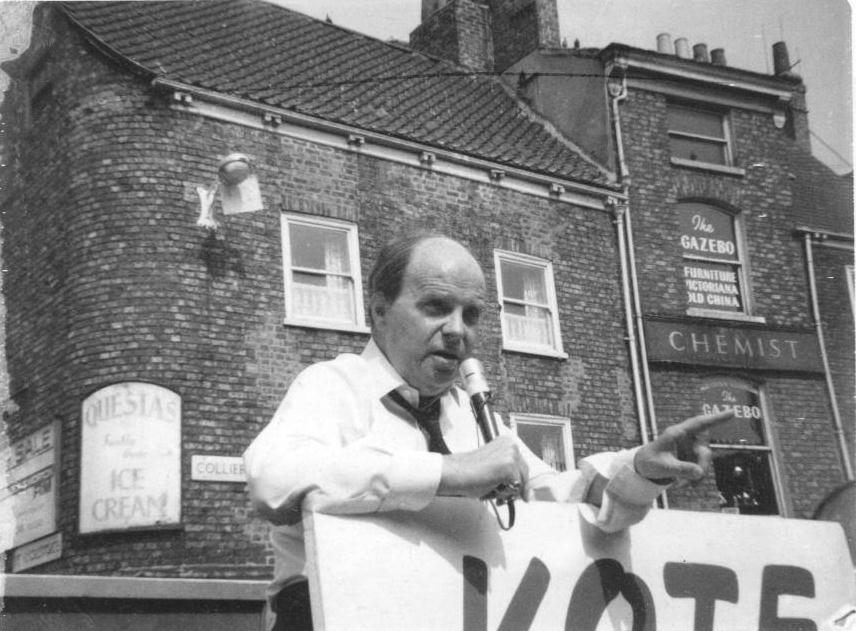
Macleod

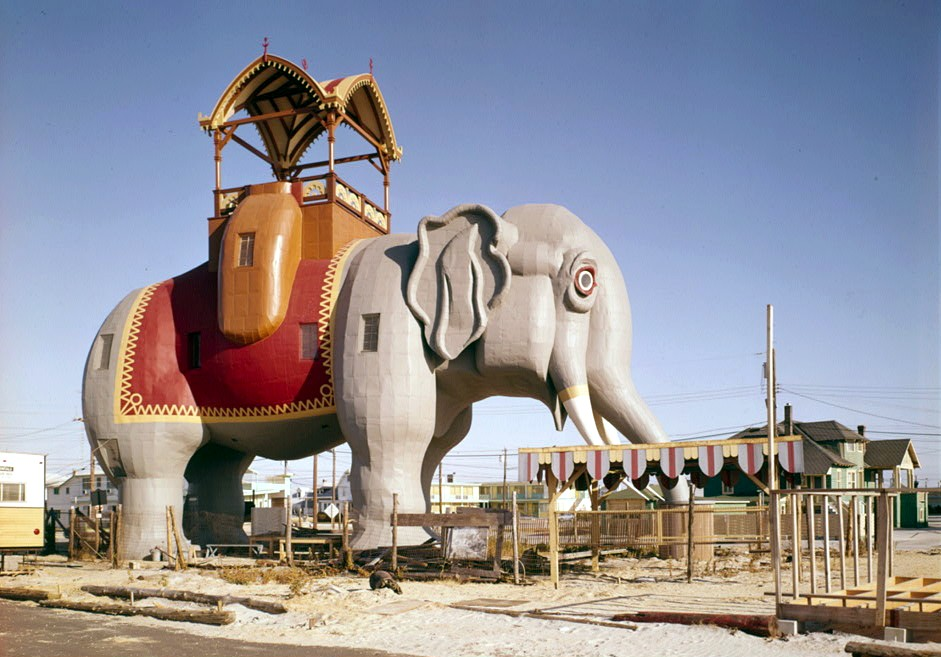
Lucy

- Iain Macleod, the British Chancellor of the Exchequer and second only to Prime Minister Edward Heath in the new Conservative Party government, died suddenly at the age of 56 after only one month in office Macleod had served for only 18 days before being hospitalized on July 8 for an emergency appendectomy, almost immediately after making a speech during the opening of Parliament. He had discharged only a day before a fatal heart attack, which took place without warning at the Chancellor's official residence at 11 Downing Street in London
- "Lucy the Elephant", a 60 ft (18 m) tall wooden landmark in Margate City, New Jersey made in the shape of an elephant, was moved to a new location after having originally been slated for demolition in order to clear the way for the building of a condominium. The building, one of the most unusual in the United States, had been a fixture since its construction by James V. Lafferty in 1881 and was saved after a committee of Margate citizens raised funds to have it transported two blocks to city-owned property.
- Died:
  - Egon Eiermann, 65, German architect
  - William Ogilvy Kermack, 72, Scottish biochemist who postulated (with A. G. McKendrick) the Kermack–McKendrick theory of distribution and number of cases of an infectious over time. Kermack was blind for the last 46 years of his life after a 1924 laboratory explosion.

== July 21, 1970 (Tuesday) ==
- The Aswan High Dam in Egypt was completed after a decade of work and one billion dollars in aid from the Soviet Union The engineers completed the Aswan Dam in southern Egypt. The damming of the Nile River created Lake Nasser, requiring the relocation of 50,000 residents of Egypt and Sudan and placing unexcavated archaeological sites underwater. Before the flooding, the Egyptian government had relocated the statue of Pharaoh Ramses II at Abu Simbel to higher ground. The hydroelectric dam provides electricity and now protects farmers in the Nile Valley from floods and from the effects of drought.
- At least 200 Vaishnavite Hindu pilgrims were killed in a flash flood of the Alaknanda River in India as they were journeying home from the Badrinath Temple in the Indian state of Uttarakhand. At the foot of the Himalayan mountains, Badrinath is one of the four Char Dham sites located in the north, west, south and east of the Indian subcontinent. Roughly 400 people were able to escape to higher ground before the river swept away 25 buses and 6 other vehicles.
- Died: U.S. Army 1st Lieutenant Bob Kalsu, 25, former American Football League tackle, was killed by mortar fire in the Vietnam War during the Battle of Fire Support Base Ripcord.

== July 22, 1970 (Wednesday) ==
- Himachal Pradesh University was established in India as the state university of Himachal Pradesh
- Olympic Airways Flight 255 was hijacked by six Arab terrorists shortly after its takeoff from Beirut to Athens. The group, who were among the 53 passengers on the Boeing 727 jet, demanded that the Greek government release seven members of their group who were in Greek jails, two of whom were still awaiting trial for a 1969 attack that had killed a Greek child and injured 13 other people. The terrorists released the remaining passengers when the jet landed in Athens, then kept the crew of seven and a civilian hostage, flying to Cairo, where they surrendered after Greece complied with their demands.
- Born: Jonathan Zaccaï, Belgian film director; in Brussels
- Died:
  - Fritz Kortner, 78, Austrian film actor and theatrical director
  - Jeffrey Radley, 40, British archaeologist, was killed in the collapse of a trench during the excavation of the 13-century-old Anglian Tower at Yorkshire. "Archaeologist killed", Birmingham (England) Evening Mail, July 13, 1970, p. 11

== July 23, 1970 (Thursday) ==
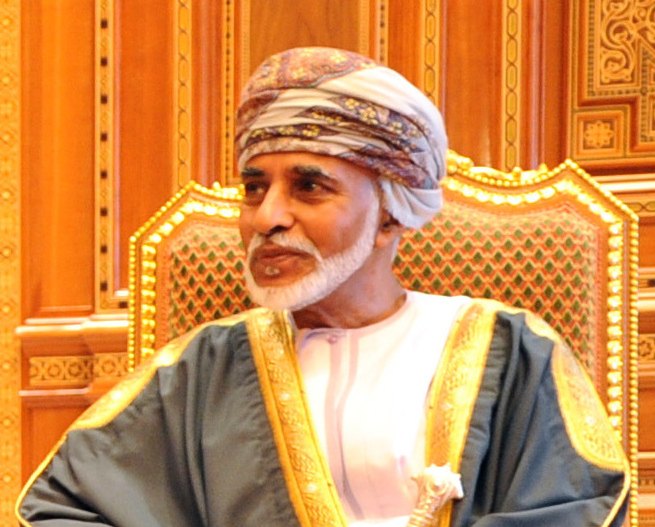
Qaboos bin Said

- Said bin Taimur, Sultan of Muscat and Oman, was deposed in a palace coup d'état by his son, Qaboos bin Said.
- An aggrieved Northern Irishman, angered at the use by the British Army of CS gas, tossed two canisters of the tear gas into the chamber of the British House of Commons while Parliament was in session, disabling the Speaker of the House, Dr. Horace King, and forcing MPs to flee.
- A federal grand jury in Detroit indicted 13 members of the U.S. domestic terrorist group Weather Underground on charges of conspiring to carry out bombings nationwide. After years in hiding, the first two indicted members would turn themselves in to authorities on March 25, 1977.
- U.S. President Richard Nixon approved the "Huston Plan", an authorization was to suspend the protections from the Fourth Amendment to the U.S. Constitution against unreasonable searches and seizures. The authorization was rescinded five days later.
- Born:
  - Saulius Skvernelis, Prime Minister of Lithuania 2016 to 2020; in Kaunas, Lithuanian SSR, Soviet Union
  - Thea Dorn (pseudonym for Christiane Scherer), German crime fiction author; in Offenbach am Main, West Germany
- Died:
  - Amadeo Bordiga, 81, founder of the Communist Party of Italy and its first leader (1921 to 1924)
  - Eino Tainio, Finnish politician (b. 1905)

== July 24, 1970 (Friday) ==
- The president of the Continental Telephone Company was murdered by a car bomb. Philip J. Lucier had gone to lunch with two of the company vice presidents in Clayton, Missouri, a suburb of St. Louis, and was preparing to back his 1966 Cadillac out of the parking lot. The bomb, placed under the car below the driver's seat, exploded when the car started. At the time, Continental Telephone, later called "Contel", was the third-largest telephone corporation in the United States. Lucier's assassins had mistaken him for Theodore F. Schwartz, the attorney for swindler Philip Morrell Wilson, who worked in the same building as the St. Louis Club restaurant and who drove a similar-looking luxury car. Nobody was ever indicted for the murder.
- Died: Peter de Noronha, 73, Indian civil engineer

== July 25, 1970 (Saturday) ==
- New Zealand's rugby union team, which had not lost a game in the past five years, was defeated by the second most successful team in the world, South Africa's Springboks, in a match before 55,000 spectators in Pretoria. The "All Blacks" of New Zealand had won 17 consecutive international matches and 55 in a row at home against domestic competition, but were behind, 12 to 0, at the end of the first half and went on to lose the match, 17 to 6.
- The U.S. Navy postponed its first ever submarine launch of the multiple-warhead Poseidon missile, the day after a Soviet Russian fishing trawler came within 200 yards (180 m) of the American sub USS James Madison during a trial run. The encounter came in international waters 30 miles (48 km) east of Florida; the "fishing boat" was believed by the U.S. to have electronic equipment used to gather data on the submarine and the new missile.
- Emilio Colombo was asked by Italy's President Giuseppe Saragat to form a new government, after the failure of Giulio Andreotti to create a coalition that would include the same four parties that had been in Mariano Rumor's government. Colombo, Italy's Minister of the Treasury for the past seven years, would form a cabinet of ministers from his own liberal Christian Democrat party and other parties on the right and left.

== July 26, 1970 (Sunday) ==
- Cuba's Prime Minister Fidel Castro offered to resign after announcing on Radio Havana that his economic strategy had failed. Castro had decided to concentrate the nation's resources on sugar production, and to divert from production of almost all other Cuban commodities. Although he came within 85% of his target goal of ten million tonnes of sugar, setting a new record of production, Cuba had a $2.2 billion debt to Soviet and to Communist bloc nations for the supply of weapons, and most other production had fallen. Castro would remain in power until his retirement in 2008, when he handed over leadership to his brother Raúl Castro.
- Wally Scott and another pilot, Ben Greene, broke the world record for distance flown in an unpowered aircraft, flying separate sailplanes a distance of 716.95 miles (1,153.82 km). Scott and Greene were released over Odessa, Texas, and touched down nine hours later in Columbus, Nebraska, breaking the 1964 record of 647.17 miles (1,041.52 km) set by Al Parker.
- Born: Glenn Helzer, American spree killer; in Pacheco, California
- Died: General Wilhelm Schepmann, 76, the last commander of Nazi Germany's Sturmabteilung (SA), the Storm Troopers

== July 27, 1970 (Monday) ==
- In Chicago, Sears, Roebuck & Company announced its plan to construct the tallest building in the world, to be 1,450 feet (440 m) high, taller than the 1,350 feet (410 m) twin towers of the World Trade Center in New York City The 110-story Sears Tower (now called the Willis Tower) would take its first tenants in 1973 and would remain the world's tallest building until 1998, when the 1,483 feet (452 m) tall Petronas Towers would open in Malaysia.
- Linda Kasabian, a former member of the Manson Family and an eyewitness to both evenings of the 1969 Tate–LaBianca murders, began testifying at the trial of Charles Manson and three other accomplices. Kasabian, who was granted immunity from prosecution in exchange for her testimony, was on the witness stand for 18 days of the trial, before finishing on August 19.
- Died:
  - António de Oliveira Salazar, 81, Prime Minister of Portugal and the nation's dictator from 1932 until a 1968 stroke left him comatose
  - Helen Rogers Reid, 88, American newspaper publisher who operated the New York Herald Tribune from 1919 until 1958
  - Michael J. Kirwan, 83, U.S. Representative for Ohio since 1937, following complications from a fall. Kirwan had been hospitalized for 13 months since sustaining a broken vertebra in an accident at The University Club in Bethesda, Maryland.
  - Pattom A. Thanu Pillai, 85, Indian politician who served as Governor of two Indian states (Punjab 1962–1964 and Andhra Pradesh 1964–1968) and as Chief Minister of Kerala (1960–1962)

== July 28, 1970 (Tuesday) ==
- Soviet leader Leonid Brezhnev, who disapproved the recent moves of East Germany's leader Walter Ulbricht to strengthen trade relations with West Germany, brought East German Security Affairs Secretary Erich Honecker to Moscow, and directed Honecker to work at removing Ulbricht from office. With an offer of support from Brezhnev, and aid from the East German secret police, the Stasi, Honecker would spend the next nine months working at the removal of Ulbricht, which would happen on May 3 at a meeting of the Central Committee of East Germany's Communist party, the SED
- U.S. President Nixon signed a bill clearing the way for competing newspapers in 22 American cities to merge their operations, with a waiver of antitrust law in cases where a newspaper was deemed by the U.S. Justice Department to be financially ailing
- Thomas O. Paine, who had directed NASA through the Apollo space program that had landed the first men on the Moon, announced his surprise resignation from the agency, effective September 15, to return to work at the General Electric Company. Paine had traveled to President Nixon's "Western White House" in San Clemente, California and met with him to announce that he was departing because of cutbacks in the NASA budget.

== July 29, 1970 (Wednesday) ==
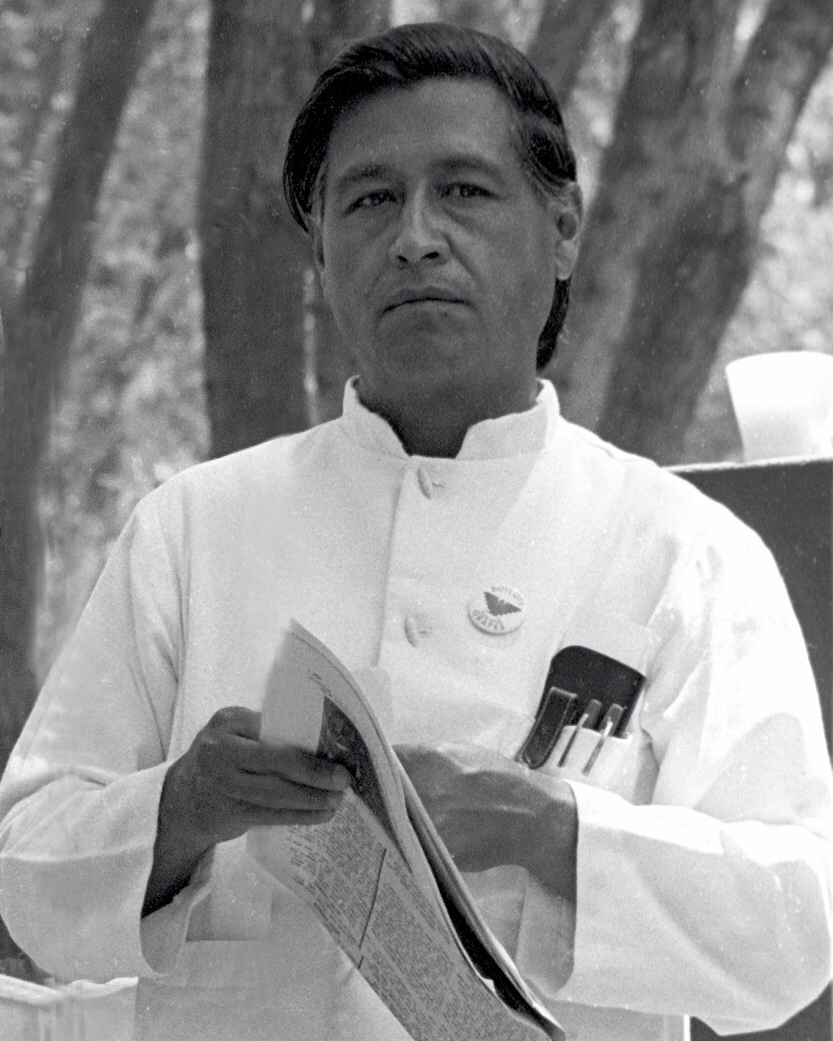
Cesar Chavez

- In Delano, California, Cesar Chavez, leader of the United Farm Workers (UFW), announced the end of the union's five-year-long strike for a fair wage for farm employees, and the halt of a successful worldwide boycott of grapes. The move came as the 26 largest grape growers (who combined to produce the majority of the grapes in the U.S.) voted to sign a contract with the union and raising the wage of the seasonal farm workers to $1.80 per hour and 20 cents for each box of grapes picked The contract collapsed within a few weeks, however, when the International Brotherhood of Teamsters were allowed to come to the farms to attempt to organize a union to compete against the UFW, and a larger walkout took place in August.
- British longshoremen ended their strike that had tied up the nation's ports for most of the month. Delegates to the Transport and General Workers Union voted, 51 to 31, to accept Lord Pearson's plan for management to increase its guaranteed minimum pay from £16 to £20 (US$38.40 to $48) per week
- Born: Andi Peters, British ITV morning news host; in Chelsea, London
- Died: Sir John Barbirolli, 70, English symphony conductor

== July 30, 1970 (Thursday) ==
- An earthquake in northeast Iran struck 100 communities The final death toll was 175 people.
- Damages totaling £485,528 were awarded to 28 British Thalidomide victims. Sir Desmond Acker, representative for the victims whose mothers had taken the drug during pregnancy, that there were 300 more claims to be paid and that £949,699 had been paid to 48 children up to that time, the equivalent at the time of US$1,045,267
- While discussions for a proposed U.S. plan for a ceasefire continued in Israel and Egypt, the comparative merits of U.S. and Soviet warplanes — and, possibly, American and Soviet pilots — given a battlefield test over the Israeli-occupied Egyptian territory east of the Suez Canal. In a series of skirmishes, the Israeli Air Force (IAF) lured Egypt's Soviet-made MiG-21s over the Israeli controlled side, where the MiGs encountered an IAF squadron of American-made Phantoms and French-made Mirage fighters. In the battle, five MiG-21s were shot down, with no losses for the Israeli side Some of the MiG-21s were flown by Soviet advisers who had been training the Egyptian pilots, and an Egyptian general speculated in a press conference that the change in IAF combat tactics was such that he believed that Americans were piloting the Phantoms. Major General Izz al-Din Mukhtar commented that "whether they were volunteers, reservists or regular U.S. military pilots, we do not know, but they were certainly not Israelis."
- For the first time, players in the National Football League voted to walk out on strike after a vote by the 1,200 veteran players in the National Football League Players Association (NFLPA). While rookies showed up at NFL training camps, most veterans elected to stay away
- Born:
  - Christopher Nolan, English-born American film director, noted for the Dark Knight trilogy of Batman films and for Interstellar, 10-time Oscar winner; in Westminster, London
  - MC Trouble (stage name for LaTasha Rogers), the first female rap artist for Motown records (d. 1991 from epileptic seizure)
- Died:
  - George Szell, 73, Hungarian-born American symphony conductor

== July 31, 1970 (Friday) ==
- By a vote of 17 to 6, the Israeli cabinet of ministers led by Golda Meir voted to accept a U.S. government peace proposal for a three-month ceasefire in the War of Attrition that had continued after the 1967 Six-Day War and a partial pullback of Israeli forces from occupied territory. The six dissenters, led by future prime minister Menahem Begin, resigned from the Meir cabinet in protest.
- NBC anchor Chet Huntley retired from full-time broadcasting He and David Brinkley had first done what became The Huntley-Brinkley Report on October 29, 1956.
- The Tupamaros, a terror group in Uruguay, kidnapped two foreign diplomats and demanded the release of 150 political prisoners as ransom. Dan Mitrione, a former police chief who was an adviser to local police as part of the U.S. Office of Public Safety program, was driving to work in Montevideo when the kidnappers blocked his car, then took him captive in their own vehicle. Aloysio Dias Gomide, the first secretary of the Brazilian embassy, was taken from his home. Two other U.S. Embassy officials, Gordon Jones and Nathan Rosenfeld, were able to elude kidnap attempts. The kidnappers set a deadline of noon on August 9 for release of the 150 prisoners. Uruguay, on recommendation of the U.S., refused to comply with the demand and Mitrione was executed at noon on August 9, after being allowed to send a final letter to his wife and children. His body was found in an abandoned car the next day. Dias Gomide and Claude Fly, another U.S. adviser taken a week after Mitrione, would be released in early 1971.
- After 238 years, the traditional daily drink of rum for British sailors was ended as the Royal Navy ended the rum ration — the "tot" that had been permitted for British seamen since 1731. The Navy had announced its plan to end the daily serving of 95.5 proof rum a year earlier, concluding (as one report described it) that "rum-soaked sailors had no place in a modern warship". While the serving of rum would still be permitted for special occasions, the daily issue of rum (for 39,000 sailors in 130 ships and frigates) was ended.
