= Phil Wilson =

Phil or Philip Wilson may refer to:

== Music ==
- Phil Wilson (trombonist) (born 1937), American jazz trombonist and educator
- Phillip Wilson (1941–1992), American jazz drummer
- Phil Wilson (singer), with The June Brides

== Politics ==
- Philip Whitwell Wilson (1875–1956), British Liberal politician and journalist
- Phil Wilson, Baron Wilson of Sedgefield (born 1959), British Labour MP for Sedgefield
- Phil Wilson (Texas politician) (born 1967), American politician and 106th Secretary of State of Texas.
- Phill Wilson (born 1956), AIDS activist

== Sports ==
- Phil Wilson (footballer, born 1960), English footballer
- Phil Wilson (footballer, born 1972), English footballer
- Phil Wilson (curler) (born 1965), Scottish curler
- Phil Wilson (hurler) (born 1939), Irish sportsman
- Phillip Wilson (rower) (born 1996), New Zealand Olympic rower

== Other ==
- Philip Wilson (bishop) (1950–2021), Catholic archbishop of the Archdiocese of Adelaide, Australia
- Philip D. Wilson Jr. (1920–2016), orthopedic surgeon
- Philip Morrell Wilson (1937–2003), conman and swindler
- Phil Wilson, fictional character in In the Flesh (TV series)
