= 1970 Swiss referendums =

Five referendums were held in Switzerland in 1970. The first was held on 1 February on a federal resolution on the domestic sugar market, and was approved by voters. The second was held on 7 June on a popular initiative "against foreign infiltration", and was rejected by voters. The third and fourth were held on 27 September on an amendment to the Swiss Federal Constitution regarding promoting gymnastics and sports, which was approved, and a popular initiative on the "right to habitation and expansion of family protection", which was rejected. The fifth was held on 15 November on an amendment to the federal financial order, which was rejected due to not enough cantons voting in favour.

== Results ==
=== February: Domestic sugar market ===
Choice	Votes	%
For	380,023	54.2
Against	320,653	45.8
Blank votes	13,615	–
Invalid votes	1,195	–
Total	715,486	100
Registered voters/turnout	1,634,975	43.8
Source: Nohlen & Stöver

=== June: Popular initiative against foreign infiltration ===
Choice	Popular vote		Cantons		
Choice	Votes	%	Full	Half	Total
For	557,517	46.0	6	2	7
Against	654,844	54.0	13	4	15
Blank votes	11,740	–	–	–	–
Invalid votes	2,557	–	–	–	–
Total	1,226,658	100	19	6	22
Registered voters/turnout	1,641,777	74.7	–	–	–
Source: Nohlen & Stöver

=== September: Constitutional amendment on promotion of sports ===
Choice	Popular vote		Cantons		
Choice	Votes	%	Full	Half	Total
For	524,361	74.6	19	6	22
Against	178,283	25.4	0	0	0
Blank votes	17,658	–	–	–	–
Invalid votes	1,081	–	–	–	–
Total	721,383	100	19	6	22
Registered voters/turnout	1,648,062	43.8	–	–	–
Source: Nohlen & Stöver

=== September: Popular initiative on housing ===
Choice	Popular vote		Cantons		
Choice	Votes	%	Full	Half	Total
For	344,640	48.9	7	2	8
Against	359,818	51.1	12	4	14
Blank votes	16,420	–	–	–	–
Invalid votes	1,192	–	–	–	–
Total	722,070	100	19	6	22
Registered voters/turnout	1,648,062	43.8	–	–	–
Source: Nohlen & Stöver

=== November: Financial order ===
Choice	Popular vote		Cantons		
Choice	Votes	%	Full	Half	Total
For	366,117	55.4	8	2	9
Against	294,965	44.6	11	4	13
Blank votes	19,658	–	–	–	–
Invalid votes	1,355	–	–	–	–
Total	682,095	100	19	6	22
Registered voters/turnout	1,665,753	40.9	–	–	–
Source: Nohlen & Stöver
