= Phil Wilson (footballer, born 1972) =

English footballer

Personal information
- Full name: Philip Michael Wilson
- Date of birth: 5 February 1972 (age 54)
- Place of birth: Stockton-on-Tees, England
- Height: 6 ft 0 in (1.83 m)
- Position: Defender

Youth career
- 1988–1990: Hartlepool United

Senior career*
Years	Team	Apps	(Gls)
1989	Hartlepool United	1	(0)
Total		1	(0)
- * Club domestic league appearances and goals

Philip Michael Wilson (born 5 February 1972) is an English former footballer who played as a defender. He played for Hartlepool United.
