= Jeffrey Radley =

British archaeologist

Jeffrey Radley FSA
- Born: 13 October 1935; Rotherham, Yorkshire
- Died: 22 July 1970 (aged 34); Anglian Tower, York
- Occupation: Archaeologist

Academic work
- Discipline: Archaeology
- Institutions: Royal Commission on the Historical Monuments of England

Jeffrey Radley FSA (13 October 1935 – 22 July 1970) was a British archaeologist and poet.

== Career ==
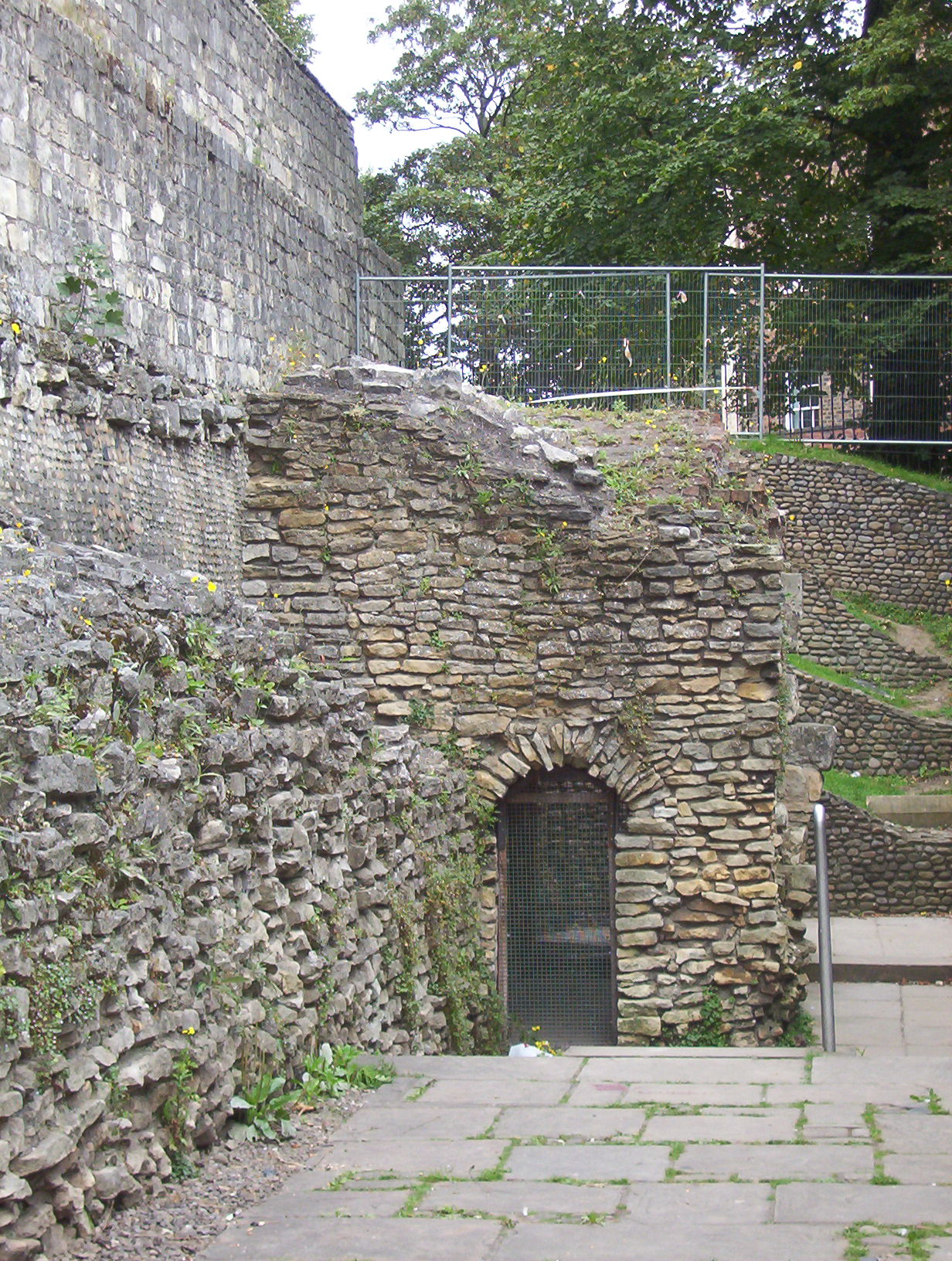
Anglian Tower, York

Radley was an archaeologist, particularly interested in Prehistoric archaeology.^{a} He was also a poet, having a collection of poems published posthumously titled Scarred Temple....

=== Death ===
Radley was killed on 22 July 1970 during excavations on the Anglian Tower in York. He had reportedly climbed down into the trench during a lunch break when it collapsed on top of him. He had been directing the excavations commissioned by the Royal Commission on the Historical Monuments of England.

A plaque on the site, unveiled by Lord Salisbury, commemorates his death:

This plaque is erected to the memory of Jeffrey Radley M.A. F.S.A. who carried out the excavation of the tower and was tragically killed in a subsequent accident at the site on July 22nd 1970.

== Notes ==
a. For a full list of Radley's archaeological publications on the ADS, see here.
