= Descoberto =

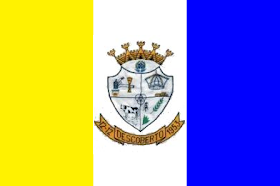
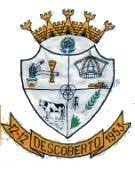
- Flag Coat of arms

- Descoberto within the map of Brazil
- Coordinates: 21.460378°S 42.965041°W
- Country: Brazil
- State: Minas Gerais

Population (2020)
  - Total: 5,029
- Time zone: UTC−3 (BRT)

Descoberto (lit. Discovered) is a municipality in the Brazilian State of Minas Gerais. It has a population of approximately 5,029 inhabitants.

== See also ==
- List of municipalities in Minas Gerais
