= Anglian Tower =

Grade I listed building in York, England

The Anglian Tower
- Part of York city walls
- York, England
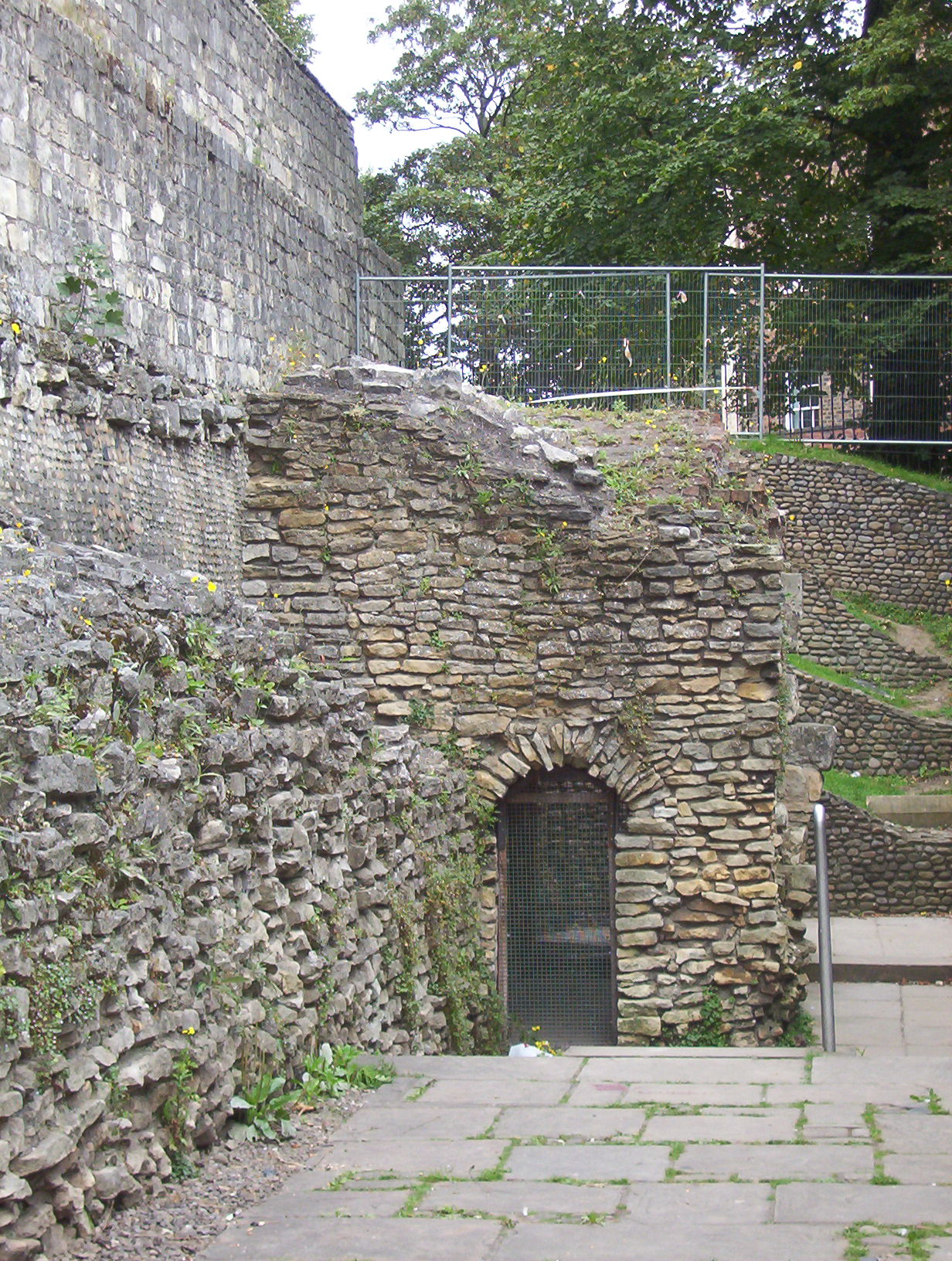
- Anglian Tower

Site information
- Type: Tower
- Condition: Ruined

Location
- Location within York City Centre
- Coordinates: 53.9615°N 1.0885°W
- Grid reference: grid reference SE599521

Listed Building – Grade I
- Official name: Anglian Tower
- Designated: 14 June 1954
- Reference no.: 1257157

The Anglian Tower is the lower portion of an early medieval tower on the city walls of York, England. It is located on the south-west (interior) face of the city walls, currently in the grounds of York City Library and accessible on foot both from there and the Museum Gardens.

== Discovery ==
The Anglian tower was first discovered by workmen making a tunnel from St Leonard's Place to Mint Yard in 1839. It was probably located again in 1934 by the City Engineer. Limited excavation was undertaken in 1969, 10 feet (3.0 m) above the modern street level and confined between the medieval town wall and the stable, only an area 25 feet (7.6 m) by 15 feet (4.6 m) being exposed. The location of the tower places it between the conjectural locations of two Roman interval towers on the south-west side of the Roman fortress.

== Function ==
There is no secular parallel for this tower in Britain, nor in Europe. It could not be directly dated, and originally proposed dates for its construction are the mid-7th century or mid-9th century. More recent, assessments, however, have queried this dating on the basis of the lack of re-used stone to construct the tower, which was built out of newly quarried limestone. Moreover, assessments of the tooling and architectural details of the tower have been argued elsewhere to suggest a fourth or fifth-century date, which would make the wall late Roman rather than Anglian. The function of the tower is also problematic. Two doorways at the base were designed to allow a sentry to walk through behind the stump of the Roman fortress wall, and there is no evidence to suggest that the tower chamber had any function other than to allow free access along the walls. The form and function of the upper part of the tower cannot be known. It may have served as a watchtower, a platform for archers or artillery, but there is no surviving evidence to substantiate any of these. The position of the tower might imply the existence of others.

== Visible remains ==
It is a small square tower, built of stone with arched doorways and tunnel-vaulted. The remains stand to a height of over three metres, abutting up against the later Medieval City Wall.

A descriptive plaque on the tower stated:

This building is the lower storey of a tower built into a breach in the 4th-century Roman fortress wall perhaps in the reign of King Edwin (616–632 AD). It was hidden under the Danish and later ramparts and rediscovered in 1839.

A second plaque commemorated the death of archaeologist Jeffrey Radley in 1970:

This plaque is erected to the memory of Jeffrey Radley M.A. F.S.A. who carried out the excavation of the tower and was tragically killed in a subsequent accident at the site on July 22nd 1970.

== See also ==
- Anglo-Saxon England
- Grade I listed buildings in the City of York
- Listed buildings in York (outside the city walls, northern part)
- Northumbria
- Yorkshire Museum

== Bibliography ==
- Barbara Wilson and Frances Mee, The City Walls and Castles of York: The Pictorial Evidence, York Archaeological Trust, 2005. ISBN 978-1-874454-36-6.
- Buckland, P. C. 1984. 'The 'Anglian Tower' and the use of Jurassic limestone in York' in Addyman, P. V. & Black, V. E. (eds), Archaeological papers from York presented to M W Barley, York: York Archaeological Trust. pp. 51–57.
- Patrick Ottaway, Roman York, Stroud: Tempus, 2004.
