= Boris Serebryakov =

Soviet serial killer and mass murderer

- Born: Boris Efimovich Serebryakov; 18 August 1941; Malgobek, Chechen-Ingush ASSR, RSFSR
- Died: 1971 (aged 29–30); Syzran, RSFSR
- Cause of death: Execution by shooting
- Other names: "The Kuybyshev Monster" "The Killer on a Bicycle" "The Night Creature" "The Predator"
- Conviction: Murder
- Penalty: Death

Details
- Victims: 9
- Span of crimes: 1969–1970
- Country: Soviet Union
- State: Samara
- Date apprehended: 8 June 1970

Boris Efimovich Serebryakov (Russian: Бори́с Ефи́мович Серебряко́в; 18 August 1941 – 1971), known as The Kuybyshev Monster (Russian: Куйбышевский монстр), was a Soviet serial killer, necrophile and mass murderer who operated in Kuybyshev (present-day Samara). He killed nine people with exceptional cruelty and caused grievous bodily harm to three others.

== Biography ==
=== Early life ===
Serebryakov was born on 18 August 1941, in Malgobek, in the Chechen-Ingush ASSR. From a young age, he exhibited criminal tendencies: having a violent personality and craving alcohol, he repeatedly got into fights with strangers, his colleagues and relatives, leading to multiple detentions by law enforcement. Although he came to the attention of the police for various offences, including inflicting bodily harm, theft, arson and rape, his guilt could never be proven. In January 1967, after being demobilized from the Soviet Army, he moved to Kuybyshev to live with his sister and began working at the Kuybyshev Cable Plant.

=== Crimes ===
On 4 September 1967, Serebryakov tried to rape Yekaterina Kharitonova, a dispatcher at one of the Kuybyshev tram depots. He burst into the control room wearing only swimming trunks and wielding a knife. During the attack, he stabbed Yekaterina in the neck and arm, but Serebryakov, frightened by her resistance, fled.

Serebryakov's first killings took place on the night of 27 to 28 April 1969. He entered a 24-room, one-story dormitory on Electrofitsirovannya Street (now Litvinov Street) through a window in one of the living rooms. Inside, he killed Stepan Zorkin, his 5-year-old son Lyonya and his wife Maria by striking them with a brick. After raping Maria's corpse, he stole 135 rubles and set fire to the deceased's clothes. The fire damaged several rooms in the dormitory, and suspicion initially fell on Maria's ex-husband.

Serebryakov committed his next crime a year later. On the night of 30 April 1970, he entered an apartment on Aeroflot Street and attacked the landlady, Ekaterina Kutsevalova, and her daughter Olga with the blunt side of an axe he had brought with him. He began to rape Ekaterina, believing she was dead, but Olga regained consciousness and started screaming, waking the neighbours and frightening Serebryakov away. Both women survived the attack.

Serebryakov travelled around the city on his bicycle while searching for victims. On the night of 8 to 9 May 1970, he killed 70-year-old Praskovya Salova and 30-year-old Nina Vasilieva with an axe. Shortly afterwards, a man named Timofeev confessed to the murders, but an investigation revealed he was lying.

After these events, panic ensued in Kuybyshev. In 1970, the USSR was scheduled to hold elections for the Supreme Soviet of the USSR. Residents refused to let agitators into their apartments, even when accompanied by police officers, stating that: "Until the killer is caught, we will not vote."

On the night of 4 to 5 June 1970, Serebryakov committed another brutal crime in a house on Podgornaya Street in the Oktyabrsky District, near Country Park. He hacked to death the Malomanov family—father, mother, and two children—with an axe. After violating the woman's corpse, he set fire to the house and fled on his bicycle.

=== Arrest and sentencing ===
On 22 May 1970, an investigative brigade was created, headed by General Igor Karpets. Militia patrols on the streets were reinforced, and the number of volunteers increased. Near one of the crime scenes, a key to Serebryakov's bicycle, branded by the Kharkov bicycle factory, was found. As a result, special attention was paid to cyclists in the search for the perpetrator.

On 8 June 1970, Serebryakov was riding a bicycle on a side street near the Airport Highway, when he was noticed by druzhinnik Zagfar Gayfullin. Initially, Serebryakov did not arouse suspicion, but a gust of wind opened his cloak, revealing an axe. This prompted a chase. Serebryakov jumped into the courtyard of a private house and hid in a street toilet. The druzhinnki, along with the house owner they had awakened, began searching the yard. One of the men, Victor Kochanov, opened the toilet and received a blow to the face, followed by a brick to the head. Serebryakov ran to the nearby Internatnaya railway station, where a freight train with fuel oil tanks was stationed. He climbed onto one of the tanks, hoping to escape by train, but was spotted by one of the machinist's assistants. Forced to flee, he ran to the other side of the railway towards the asphalt plant. There, he climbed a tree and jumped into the territory of the Progress Rocket Space Center, triggering an alarm. Soon after, Serebryakov was detained by the plant's security guards and handed over to the police. Serebryakov's arrest occurred a week before the election. The policeman who arrested him was promoted two ranks, from senior lieutenant to major.

Serebryakov's fingerprints and blood type matched those of the murderer, and stolen items from the victims were found in his room. He soon confessed to the crimes. A forensic psychiatric examination determined that Serebryakov did not suffer from mental illness, and although he exhibited clear behavioral deviations, they did not prevent his criminal prosecution. He was diagnosed with psychopathy.

During the court hearing, the courtroom was packed, with people looking through the windows to see the man who had terrorized the entire city for almost a year and a half. In the fall of 1970, the Kuybyshev Regional Court sentenced Serebryakov to death. Upon hearing the verdict, the audience applauded, while Serebryakov ominously said: "I'll be back". All his petitions for a pardon were rejected, and in early 1971, Boris Serebryakov was executed in the Syzran Prison.

For their role in apprehending the particularly dangerous criminal, all the militiamen were awarded medals for "Excellent Service in the Protection of Public Order".

== See also ==
- List of Russian serial killers
