= Huston Plan =

Plan by the Nixon administration to increase domestic surveillance

The Huston Plan was a 43-page report and outline of proposed security operations put together by White House aide Tom Charles Huston in 1970. It came to light during the 1973 Watergate hearings headed by Senator Sam Ervin (D-NC). According to U.S. Senator Charles Mathias (R-MD), U.S. President Richard Nixon rescinded the plan on July 28, 1970, after approving it on July 23. Mathias commented that "Many constitutional lawyers believe that for five days in 1970 the fundamental guarantees of the Bill of Rights were suspended by the mandate given the secret 'Huston plan,'" and that during the five days the plan was approved, "authoritarian rule had superseded the constitution." Specifically, the authorization was to suspend the protections from the Fourth Amendment to the U.S. Constitution against unreasonable searches and seizures.

The impetus for this report was President Richard Nixon's desire for coordination of domestic intelligence on purported 'left-wing radicals' and the counterculture-era anti-war movement in general. Huston had been assigned as White House liaison to the Interagency Committee on Intelligence (ICI), a group chaired by J. Edgar Hoover, then Federal Bureau of Investigation (FBI) Director. Huston worked closely with William C. Sullivan, Hoover's assistant, in drawing up the options listed in what eventually became the document known as the Huston Plan.

The plan called for domestic burglary, illegal electronic surveillance, and opening the mail of domestic "radicals". At one time, it also called for camps in Western states where anti-war protesters would be detained.

On July 23, 1970, Nixon ratified the proposals, and they were submitted as a document to the directors of the FBI, Central Intelligence Agency (CIA), Defense Intelligence Agency (DIA), and the National Security Agency (NSA).

Only Hoover objected to the plan and gained the support of then Attorney General of the United States John Mitchell to pressure Nixon to rescind the plan. Despite the ultimate decision by the President to revoke the Huston Plan, several of its provisions were implemented.

After the Huston Plan, the FBI lowered the age of campus informants, thereby expanding surveillance of American college students as sought through the plan. In 1971, the FBI reinstated its use of mail covers and continued to submit names to the CIA mail program.

As details of the Huston Plan unfolded during the Watergate Hearings, it came to be seen as part of what Attorney General Mitchell referred to as "White House horrors". This included the Plumbers Unit, the proposed fire-bombing of the Brookings Institution, the 1971 burglary of the office of the psychiatrist of Daniel Ellsberg, the creation of a White House enemies list, and the use of the Internal Revenue Service (IRS) to punish those deemed to be enemies.

The Huston Plan was also investigated by the U.S. Senate Select Committee on Intelligence, chaired by Senator Frank Church in 1976, into activities of the CIA and abuses of domestic intelligence gathering.
