= Philip Morrell Wilson =

American fraudster

Philip Morrell Wilson (August 6, 1937 – January 15, 2003) was an international conman and swindler. He was best known for operating the fraudulent Bank of Sark.

Wilson was born in St. Louis, Missouri. He started out as a life insurance salesman. From 1968 to 1972 he operated the Bank of Sark in Guernsey, Channel Islands. (The bank was named for, but not located in, the neighboring island of Sark.) The bank consisted of a one-room office, a telephone, and a telex machine. He managed to get the bank published in Polk's Bank Directory to lend an air of legitimacy. He used Bahamian accountant Samuel Wilkinson to certify financial statements that showed $72 million in assets, although the bank had almost no assets. At the same time he also operated the First Liberty Fund Ltd. in Bahamas, a mutual fund, and Trans Continental Casualty Co., an insurance company. He sold worthless bank drafts, letters of credit and certificates of deposit to other conmen, who used them to swindle banks and investors. The fraud netted an estimated $40 million to $70 million. For this fraud, Wilson received a three-year prison sentence and five years probation, and served 1.5 years. He then moved to Hollywood, Florida and started Fraudmasters, Inc., a consulting company on fraud. In 1973 he testified before the United States Senate Permanent Subcommittee on Investigations regarding securities frauds.

In 1970, through his Bank of Sark operation involving advance fees, two of Wilson's associates were involved in swindling New Orleans crime family member Santo DiFatta. In an act of revenge using a car bomb, the mafia killed Continental Telephone Corp. president Philip J. Lucier in a case of mistaken identity, instead of their intended target, attorney Theodore F. Schwartz.

Wilson was in prison on and off between 1976 and 1983 on charges of fraud, bail jumping, interstate transportation of stolen property and conspiracy. He was then convicted in 1984 of conspiracy to smuggle drugs. In 1988 he was under investigation for his involvement in Omni Capital Corp. in Plantation, Florida, which was an advance fee operation. In 1990 he was charged with and convicted for fraud, racketeering and grand theft for his involvement in the International Investment Trust, which issued worthless certificates, defrauding businesses and a Luxembourg bank. Wilson was also involved in a fraudulent venture capital scheme using bogus letters of credit between 1999 and 2001, but died in January 2003 before he could be arrested.
