= Robert Wilson =

Robert Wilson may refer to:

== Entertainment ==
=== Writers ===
- Robert Anton Wilson (1932–2007), American writer, futurist, and mystic
- Robert Burns Wilson (1850–1916), American painter and poet
- Robert C. Wilson (born 1951), American novelist and lawyer
- Robert Charles Wilson (born 1953), Canadian science fiction writer
- R. McL. Wilson (Robert McLachlan Wilson, 1916–2010), Scottish biblical scholar and translator
- Robert McLiam Wilson (born 1966), Northern Irish novelist
- Robert McNair Wilson (1882–1963), British surgeon, fiction writer, and politician
- Robert Wilson (crime novelist) (born 1957), British crime novelist
- Robert Wilson (dramatist) (died 1600), English Elizabethan dramatist
- Robert Wilson (editor) (born 1951), American magazine editor and author

=== Musicians ===
- Rob Wilson, known as Fresh I.E. (born 1973), Canadian rapper
- Robert Wilson (tenor) (1907–1964), Scottish tenor
- Robert Wilson (American singer) (1957–2010), American R&B and funk musician in The Gap Band
- Robert Wilson (music entrepreneur) (born 1951), British musician and charity founder
- Juice Wilson (Robert Wilson, 1904–1993), American jazz violinist
- Robert Wilson (born 1980), Bobby V, American R&B singer formerly known as Bobby Valentino

=== Other entertainment ===
- Robert Scott Wilson (born 1987), American model and actor
- Robert Wilson (director) (1941–2025), American avant-garde stage director and playwright
- Robert Wilson (1941–2017), American advertising executive; father of Andrew, Owen, and Luke Wilson

== Military ==
- Sir Robert Wilson (British Army officer, born 1777) (1777–1849), British Army general
- Robert Wilson (British Army officer, born 1911) (1911–2002), British Army special operations officer
- Robert L. Wilson (1920–1944), United States Marine and Medal of Honor recipient

== Politics ==
- Gordon Wilson (Scottish politician) (1938–2017, Robert Gordon Wilson), Scottish politician and solicitor
- Rob Wilson (born 1965), British politician and entrepreneur, MP for Reading East
- Robert A. Wilson (Virginia politician) (1913–2003), vice mayor of Richmond, Virginia
- Robert D. Wilson (1839–1930), member of the Wisconsin State Assembly
- Robert E. Wilson (politician) (1856–1921), state auditor of Mississippi
- Robert J. Wilson, candidate in the 1953 Manitoba provincial election
- Robert John Wilson (1865–1946), member of parliament in 1922 for Jarrow
- Robert L. Wilson (politician) (1805–1880), American politician
- Robert Nichol Wilson, Northern Irish politician
- Robert P. C. Wilson (1834–1916), U.S. representative from Missouri
- Robert Richard Wilson (1891–1969), farmer and politician in South Australia
- Sir Robert Wilson (Australian politician) (1896–1973), New South Wales politician
- Robert Wilson (Manitoba politician) (born 1934), Manitoba politician
- Robert Wilson (Missouri politician) (1803–1870), U.S. senator from Missouri
- Robert Wilson (Texas politician) (1793–1856), land speculator and politician in Texas

== Science and medicine ==
- Robert A. Wilson (gynecologist) (1895–1981), American gynecologist who wrote the book Feminine Forever
- Robert Wilson (physician) (1829–1881), wrote about the British mining industry
- Robert O. Wilson (1904–1967), American physician
- Robert R. Wilson (1914–2000), American physicist
- Sir Robert Wilson (astronomer) (1927–2002), British astronomer
- Robert Woodrow Wilson (born 1936), American astronomer and physicist
- Robert B. Wilson (born 1937), American economist
- Robert E. Wilson (astrophysicist) (born 1937), astrophysicist, academic, and author

== Sports ==
=== American football ===
- Robert P. Wilson (1875–1959), American college football player and coach
- Robert Wilson (running back) (born 1969), American football player
- Robert Wilson (wide receiver) (1974–2020), American football player

=== Cricket ===
- Robert Wilson (cricketer, born 1916) (1916–2004), Scottish cricketer
- Robert Wilson (cricketer, born 1922) (1922–1980), English cricketer
- Robert Wilson (cricketer, born 1934), English cricketer
- Robert Wilson (cricketer, born 1935) (1935–1987), Scottish cricketer
- Robert Wilson (cricketer, born 1948), New Zealand cricketer

=== Rugby ===
- Robert Wilson (rugby union, born 1854) (1854–1911), Scottish rugby union player
- Robert Wilson (rugby union, born 1861) (1861–1944), rugby union player for New Zealand in 1884
- Robert Wilson (rugby league) (1879–1916), rugby league footballer for England and Broughton Ranchers

=== Other sports ===
- Robert Wilson (Scottish footballer) (fl. 1909–1913), Scottish footballer (Partick Thistle}
- Robert Wilson (Canadian rower) (born 1935), Canadian Olympic rower
- Robert Wilson (tennis) (1935–2020), English tennis player
- Robert Wilson (American rower) (born 1939), American Olympic rower
- Rob Wilson (racing driver) (born 1952), racing driver from New Zealand
- Robert Wilson (bobsleigh) (born 1954), Canadian Olympic bobsledder
- Robert Wilson (footballer, born 1961), English football player for Fulham
- Rob Wilson (ice hockey) (born 1968), Canadian-British professional ice hockey coach
- Robert Wilson (fencer), Scottish fencer

== Other ==
- Robert Arnott Wilson (born 1958), British mathematician
- Robert Dick Wilson (1856–1930), American linguist and Presbyterian scholar
- Robert E. Lee Wilson (1865–1933), American cotton plantation owner
- Robert Gordon Wilson (architect) (1844–1931), Scottish architect
- Robert Kenneth Wilson (1899–1969), surgeon who in 1934 supposedly took a photograph purporting to show the Loch Ness Monster
- Robert M. Wilson Jr. (1952–2012), Arkansas lawyer
- Robert W. Wilson (philanthropist) (1926–2013), American hedge fund manager and philanthropist
- Robert Wilson (architect) (1834–1901), Scottish architect
- Sir Robert Wilson (businessman, born 1943), British businessman, chairman of Rio Tinto Group and of BG Group
- Robert Wilson (Scottish businessman) (born 1956), chairperson of football club Livingston
- Robert Wilson (engineer) (1803–1882), Scottish engineer and inventor
- Robert Wilson (philosopher) (born 1964), philosophy professor
- Robert Wilson (priest, born 1840) (1840–1897), English Anglican priest and academic, warden of Keble College, Oxford
- Robert Wilson (dean of Ferns), 17th-century Anglican dean in Ireland
- Robert Wilson (ship captain) (1806–1888), Great Lakes captain who helped slaves escape
- Robert Wilson (merchant) (1832–1899), New Zealand merchant and company director
- Robert & William Wilson, American silversmiths in Philadelphia during the 19th century

== Other uses ==
- USS Robert L. Wilson, United States Navy destroyer named for Robert L. Wilson
- Robert Wilson, big-game hunter in the Ernest Hemingway short story "The Short Happy Life of Francis Macomber"

== See also ==
- Bert Wilson (disambiguation)
- Bob Wilson (disambiguation)
- Bobby Wilson (disambiguation)
- Robert Willson (disambiguation)
- Robert Gordon Wilson (disambiguation)
- Robert Lee Wilson (disambiguation)
