= Bob Wilson =

Bob Wilson may refer to:

== Association footballers ==
- Bob Wilson (footballer, born 1867) (1867–?), Irish international footballer of the 1880s
- Bob Wilson (footballer, born September 1898) fl. 1920s, Scottish footballer with Third Lanark and Fall River F.C. (USA)
- Bob Wilson (footballer, born 1928) (1928–2006), English footballer for Preston North End and Tranmere Rovers
- Bob Wilson (footballer, born 1934) (1934–2025), Scottish footballer for Norwich City and Gillingham
- Bob Wilson (footballer, born 1941), Scottish international football goalkeeper for Arsenal; later a broadcaster
- Bob Wilson (footballer, born 1943) (1943–2020), English football goalkeeper
- Bob Wilson (New Zealand footballer), New Zealand international football (soccer) player

== Other sports players ==
- Bob Wilson (basketball) (1926–2014), American professional basketball player
- Robert Wilson (rugby league) (1879–1916), English rugby player of early 20th century
- Bob Wilson (rugby union) (1926–1985), Scotland international rugby union player
- Bob Wilson (baseball) (1925–1985), played for the 1958 L.A. Dodgers
- Bob Wilson (footballer, born 1907) (1907–1982), Australian rules footballer for Richmond
- Bob Wilson (footballer, born August 1898) (1898–1986), Australian rules footballer for Carlton
- Bob Wilson (footballer, born 1945), former Australian rules footballer for Essendon
- Bob Wilson (cricketer) (born 1928), English cricketer
- Bob Wilson (American football) (1913–1999), American football player
- Bob Wilson (ice hockey) (1934–2020), Canadian ice hockey player

== Other ==
- Bob Wilson (cartoonist) (born 1942), British cartoonist of the Stanley Bagshaw series of children's cartoons
- Bob Wilson (economist) (born 1937), American economist and professor at Stanford University
- Bob Wilson (sportscaster) (1929–2015), radio sportscaster for the Boston Bruins
- Bob Wilson (politician) (1916–1999), U.S. Representative from California
- Bob Wilson (singer) (born c. 1940), Californian singer-guitarist, first to record "(And Her Name Is) Scarlet"
- Robert Tudawali (1929–1967), Australian actor also known as Bob or Bobby Wilson
- The protagonist of Robert Heinlein's science fiction story "By His Bootstraps"

== See also ==
- Bob Wilson (Fatal Fury), fictional character from the Fatal Fury series video games
- "Bob Wilson - Anchorman", a 2001 song by English indie rock band Half Man Half Biscuit
- Robert Wilson (disambiguation)
- Bobby Wilson (disambiguation)
- Bob Willson (1928–2019), Canadian television host
