= Crooked Tree =

Crooked Tree may refer to:

- Crooked Tree, Belize, a village in Belize District, Belize
- Crooked Tree (novel), a book published in 1980
- Crooked Tree (album), a 2022 album by Molly Tuttle
