= Peter L. Krider =

American silversmith (1821–1895)

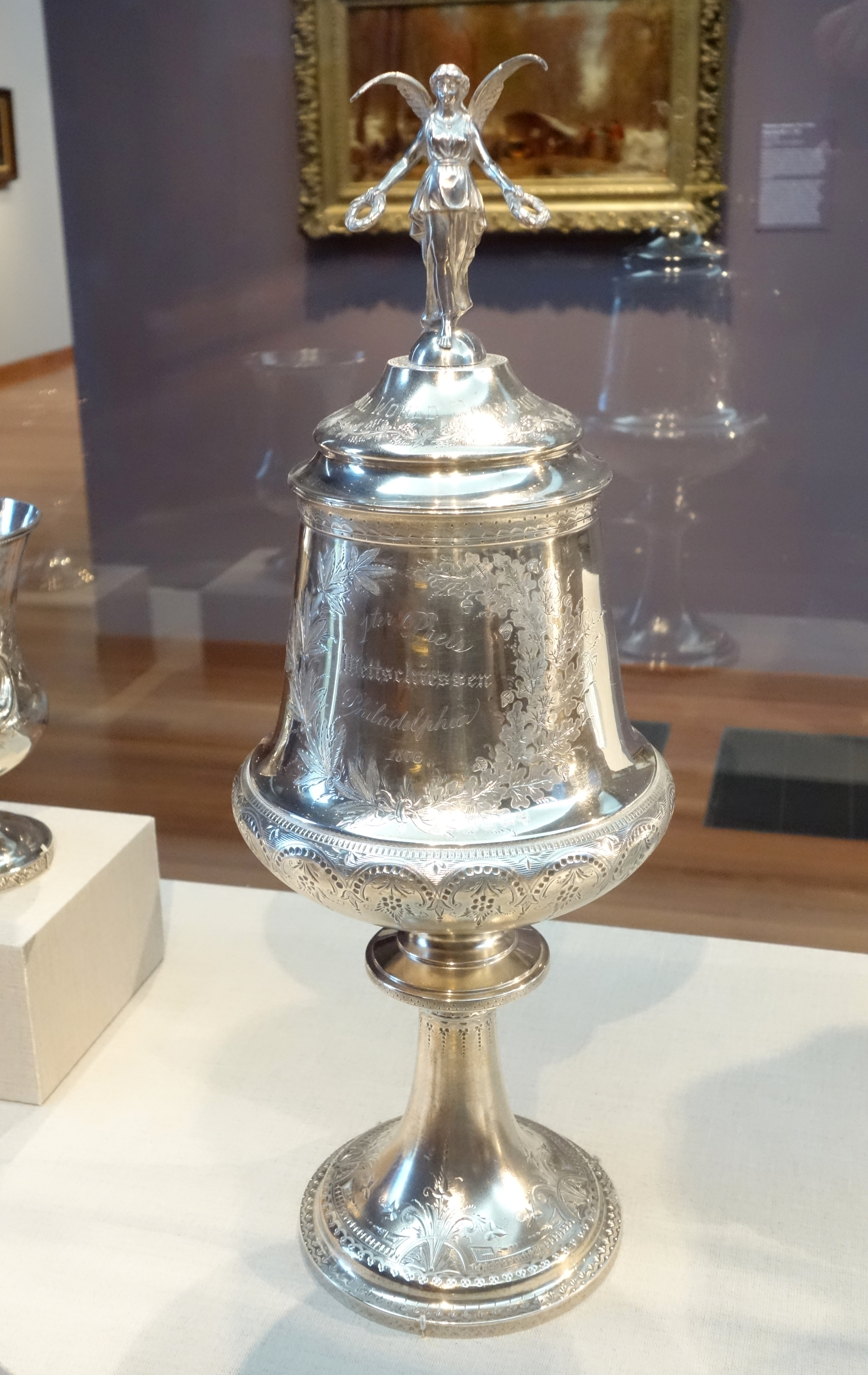
Trophy cup with cover by Peter L. Krider, 1876

Peter Lewis Krider (February 14, 1821 - May 12, 1895), also known as P.L. Krider, was a noted American silversmith, active in Philadelphia.

Krider was born in Philadelphia and worked on a farm from ages 10 to 14. From 1835-1841 was apprentice to Philadelphia silversmith John Curry, and worked as a journeyman for about 15 months at the well-known firm of Robert & William Wilson. Around 1842 he moved to Boston, where he worked for silversmith Obadiah Rich. When Rich sold out his establishment to Brackett, Crosby & Brown, Krider took charge. He later returned to Philadelphia to serve as the Wilsons' foreman. In 1850 he established his own firm, Krider & Co., working from 1859 until about 1870 as Krider & Biddle with his partner John W. Biddle, and subsequently as Peter L. Krider. According to the Federal Industrial Censuses of 1860, 1870, and 1880, and a short description in Philadelphia's Leading Industries (1866), his business was well capitalized and employed as many as 35 skilled workers. The firm was sold to August Weber in 1888 and renamed the Peter L. Krider Co., which remained in business until 1910.

Krider produced large amounts of solid silver flatware and hollowware, often sold through retailers such as Bailey and Company, J. E. Caldwell, and firms outside Philadelphia. He also created society and exposition medals, including award medals for the Centennial Exposition in 1876. His works are collected in the Art Institute of Chicago, Carnegie Museum of Art, Cooper Hewitt Museum, Dallas Museum of Art, De Young Museum, Philadelphia Museum of Art, Winterthur Museum, and Yale University Art Gallery.
