= USS Northampton (CLC-1) =

US Navy command light cruiser (1953–1970)

Coordinates: 42.3176001°N 72.6326363°W

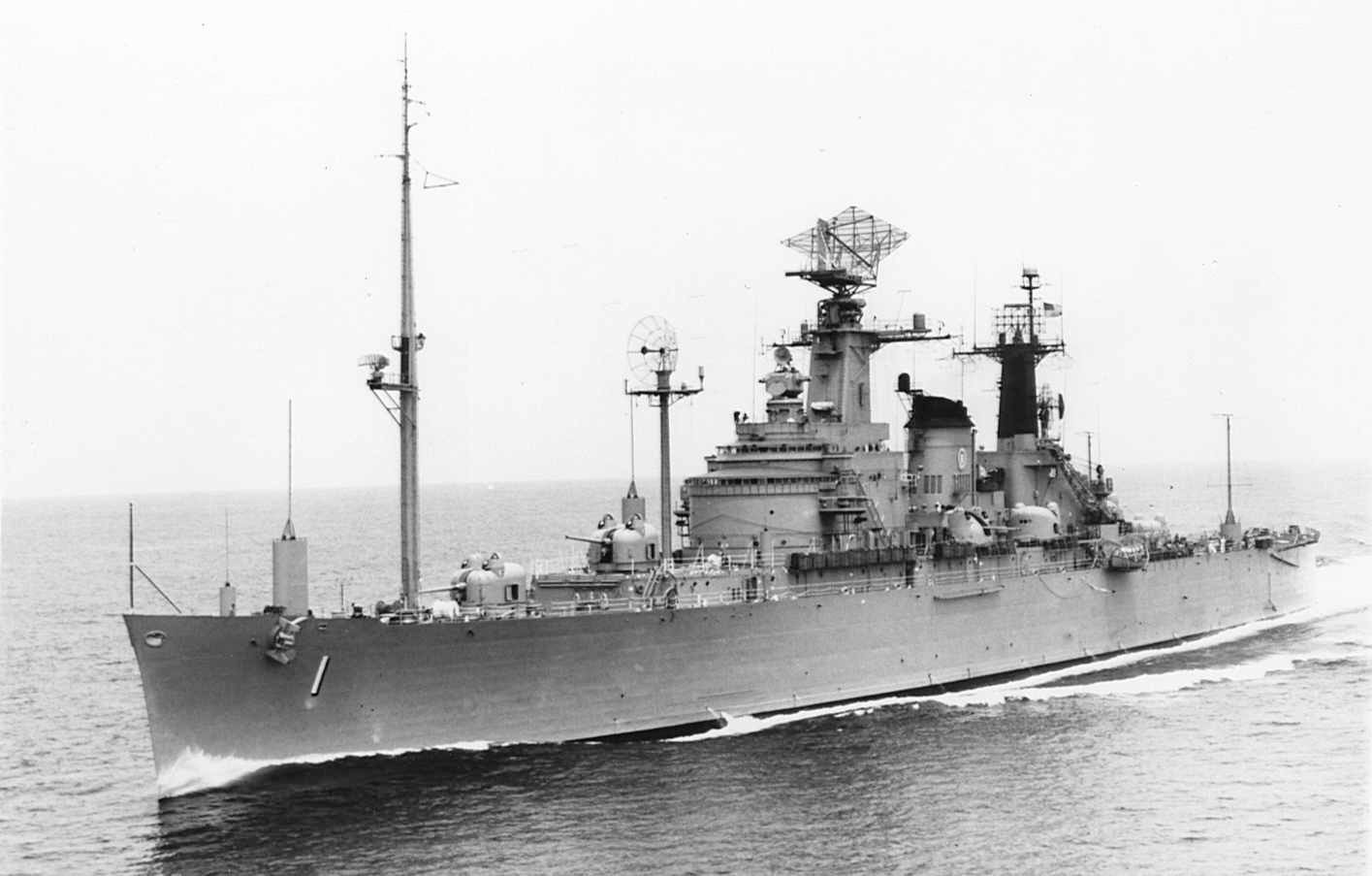
- USS Northampton underway in 1959

History

United States
- Name: Northampton
- Namesake: Northampton, Massachusetts
- Builder: Bethlehem Steel Corporation, Quincy, Massachusetts
- Laid down: 31 August 1944
- Launched: 27 January 1951
- Sponsored by: Mrs. Edmond J. Lampron
- Commissioned: 7 March 1953
- Decommissioned: 8 April 1970
- Reclassified: CLC-1, 27 January 1951; CC-1, 15 April 1961
- Stricken: 1 December 1977
- Identification: Callsign: NTBX; Hull number: CA-125
- Honors and awards: See Awards
- Fate: Scrapped, December 1977
- Notes: Bell at the Northampton Human Resources

General characteristics
- Class & type: Oregon City-class cruiser
- Displacement: 13,700 long tons (13,920 t)
- Length: 674 ft 11 in (205.71 m)
- Propulsion: Steam turbines, 120,000 shp (89 MW), 4 boilers, 4 shafts
- Speed: 33 knots (61 km/h; 38 mph)
- Complement: 2,000
- Sensors & processing systems: 1 × AN/SPS-2
- Armament: 4 × 5"/54 caliber Mark 42 guns (4×1); 8 × 3 in/70 caliber guns (4×2)
- Armor: Belt: 6 in (150 mm); Deck: 2.5 in (64 mm)
- Aviation facilities: landing pad available for one helicopter

The USS Northampton (CLC-1/CC-1) was a US Navy command light cruiser (command ship). The third ship of that name, she was laid down as an Oregon City-class heavy cruiser (CA–125), on 31 August 1944 by the Fore River Yard, Bethlehem Steel Corp., Quincy, Massachusetts. Work suspended between 11 August 1945 and 1 July 1948; she was converted to a command cruiser under project SCB 13 and launched as CLC–1, on 27 January 1951; sponsored by Mrs. Edmond J. Lampron; and commissioned as CLC–1, on 7 March 1953.

== History ==
Following shakedown, Northampton reported for duty to Commander Operational Development Forces, Atlantic Fleet. For seven months she conducted extensive tests of her new equipment. Evaluation completed in September 1954 and she reverted to the operational control of Commander Battleship Cruiser Force, Atlantic Fleet. She next demonstrated her capabilities as a tactical Command Ship by serving as flagship, first for Commander Amphibious Force, Atlantic Fleet (October–November 1954) and then for Commander 6th Fleet (December 1954–March 1955). Between 1 September and 22 October she served as flagship for Commander Strike Force, Atlantic, a position she was to hold frequently over the next fifteen years.

On 24 February 1956, Northampton emerged from her first overhaul at the Norfolk Naval Shipyard, Portsmouth, Virginia, and, after refresher training off Cuba, participated as a unit of the Navy's first guided missile division afloat, CruDiv 6, in the first public demonstration of the Terrier missile. In April, she steamed east for six months with the 6th Fleet, and, during the summer of 1957, resumed midshipmen training cruises. However, between that time and 1961, she infrequently returned to European waters. Deployed on occasion for NATO and fleet exercises and People to People visits, the command ship was visited by high government officials of various European countries, including Kings Baudouin of Belgium and Olav V of Norway.

== Decommissioning ==
Redesignated CC–1 on 15 April 1961, Northampton remained in the western Atlantic until decommissioning in February 1970. Her cruises ranged from Canadian to Panamanian waters as she extensively tested and evaluated new communications equipment and played host to visiting national and international dignitaries, including Presidents John F. Kennedy and Lyndon B. Johnson. The ship was eventually withdrawn from service, and was stricken from the Naval Vessel Register on 31 December 1977 during the Carter Administration.

The ship's bell is preserved at the war memorial in front of Memorial Hall, in the ship's namesake city of Northampton, Massachusetts.

== Other roles ==
Besides acting as a fleet command ship, Northampton was planned for or actually functioned in at least two other roles.

=== Pilotfish ===
When the first supercarrier USS United States (CVA-58) was being designed, it was thought she would not be able to have an island or masts for radar or other antennas. Therefore, the Northampton was seen as a 'pilotfish', a ship that would escort the carrier and act not only as a radar picket (although from the center of the task force rather than the periphery as a true picket would), but also as the radar director of aircraft approach and landing on the carrier. The recent invention of the angled flight deck made it possible to install islands and radar on supercarriers, and so this role was eliminated from the Northampton and the United States-class of carrier was never built.

=== "Floating White House" ===
According to a Washington Post article on 29 July 2006, Northampton was part of the U.S. government's 1960s plan for Continuity of Operations and reported to be a "floating White House" to which the President could be evacuated in the event of nuclear attack. As such she was designated as the National Emergency Command Post Afloat (NECPA); Northampton was one of two ships to serve in the role, with the other being the aircraft carrier USS Wright. The ship was modified with an extra deck, the tallest communications mast in the Navy and multi-link communications gear.

== Gallery ==
USS Northampton Lifecycle

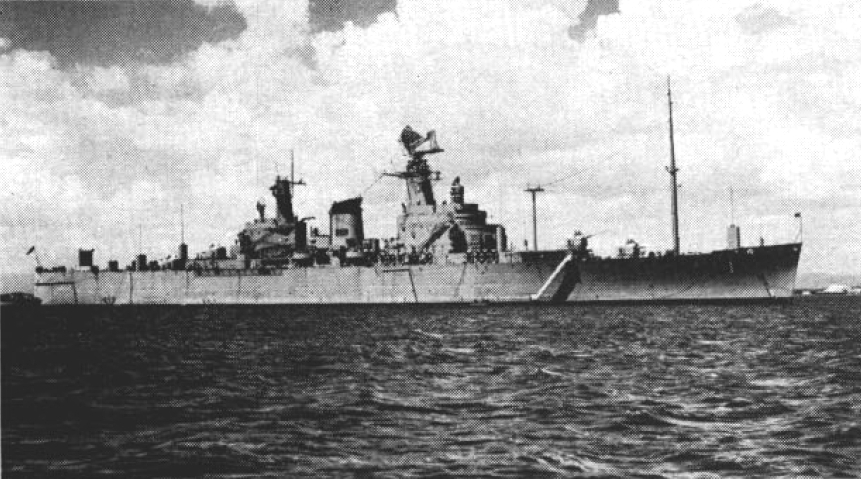
Northampton at Guantanamo Bay, Cuba in 1954.

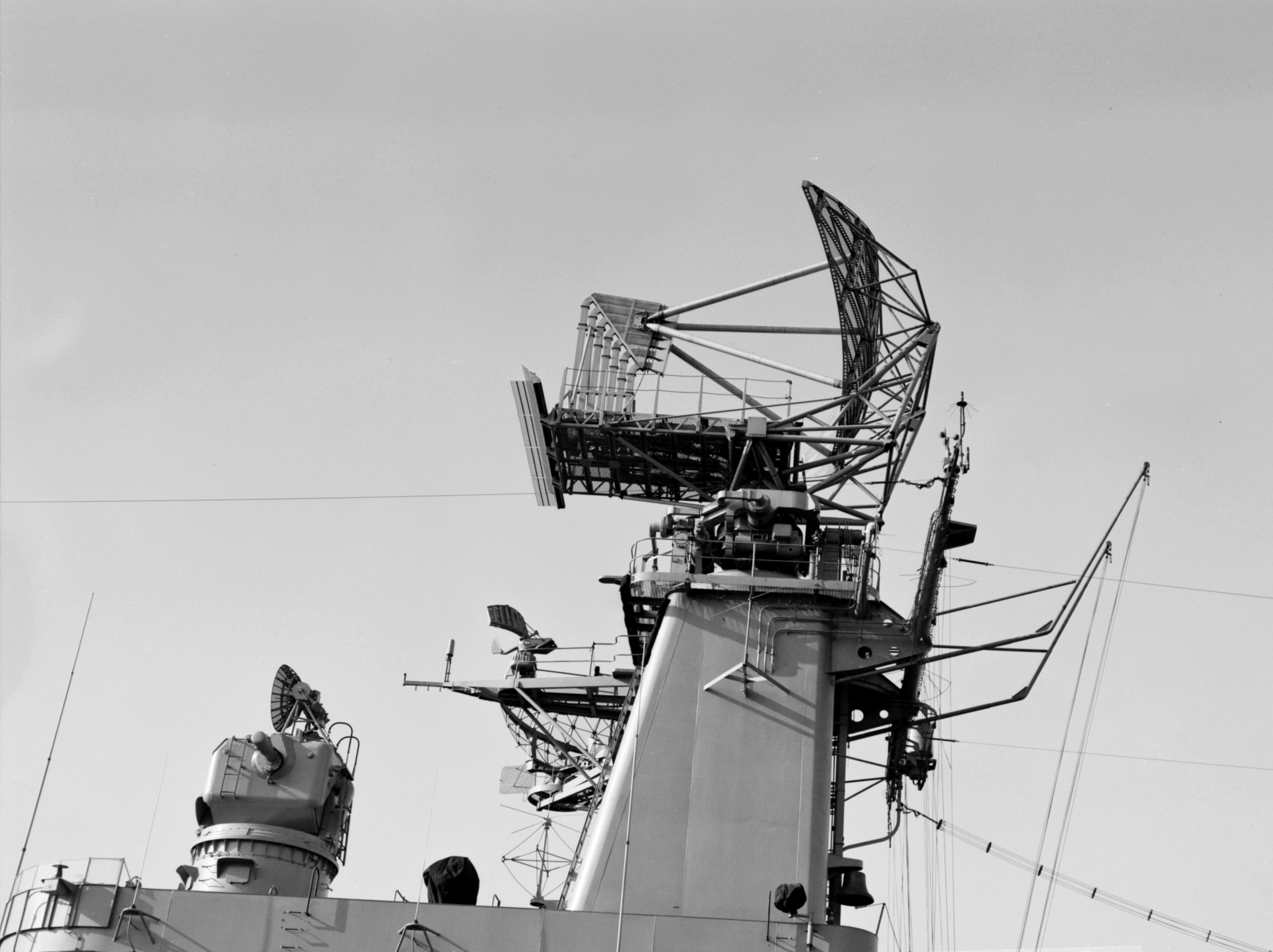
Close up of Northampton’s SPS-2 antenna c. 1954.

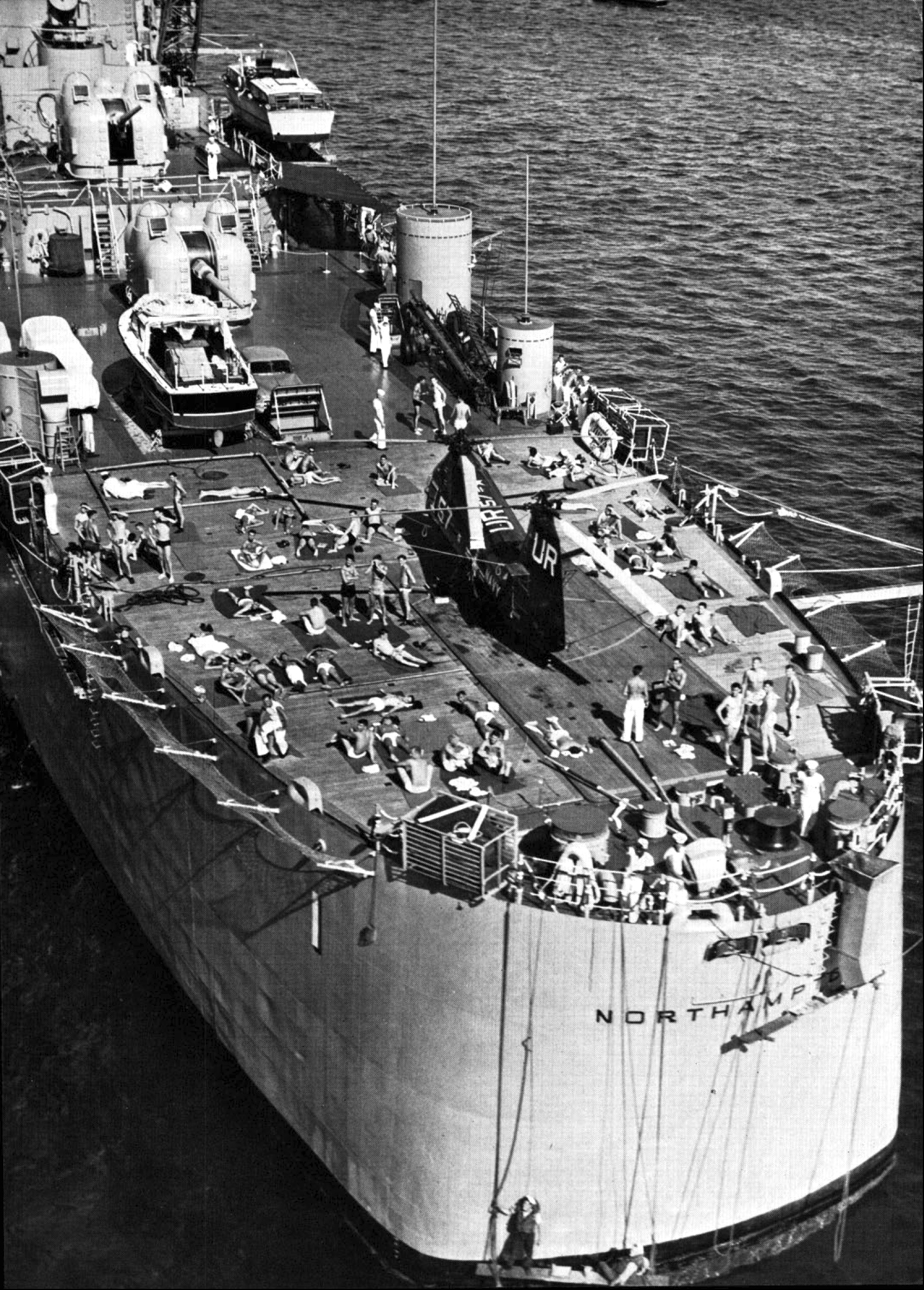
Northampton’s crews relaxing on the fantail of the ship in 1957.

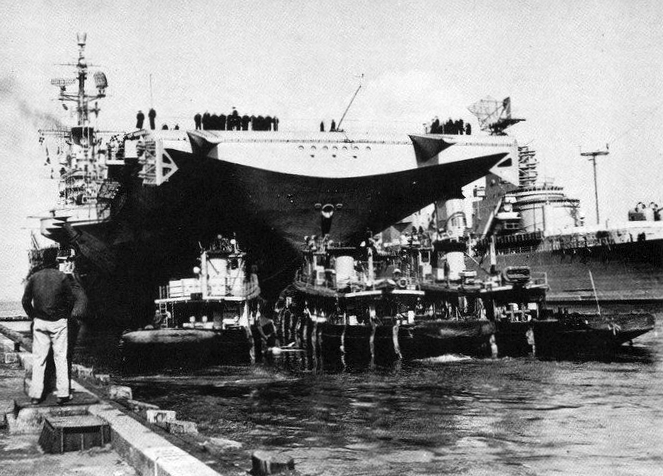
Ticonderoga alongside Northampton at Norfolk, Virginia in 1957.

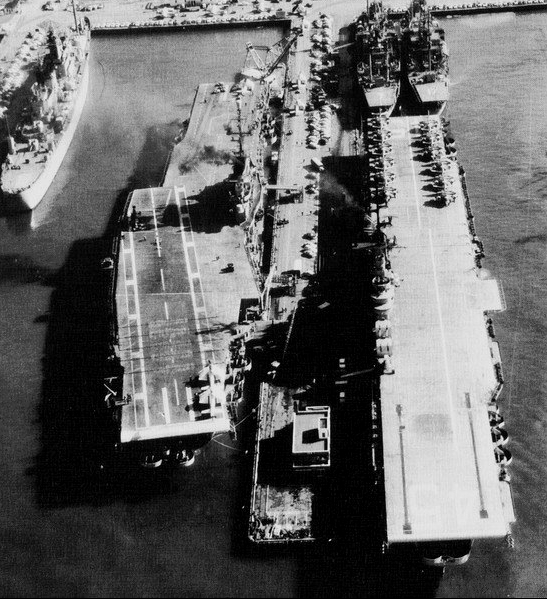
Northampton, Intrepid and Valley Forge at Norfolk in 1957

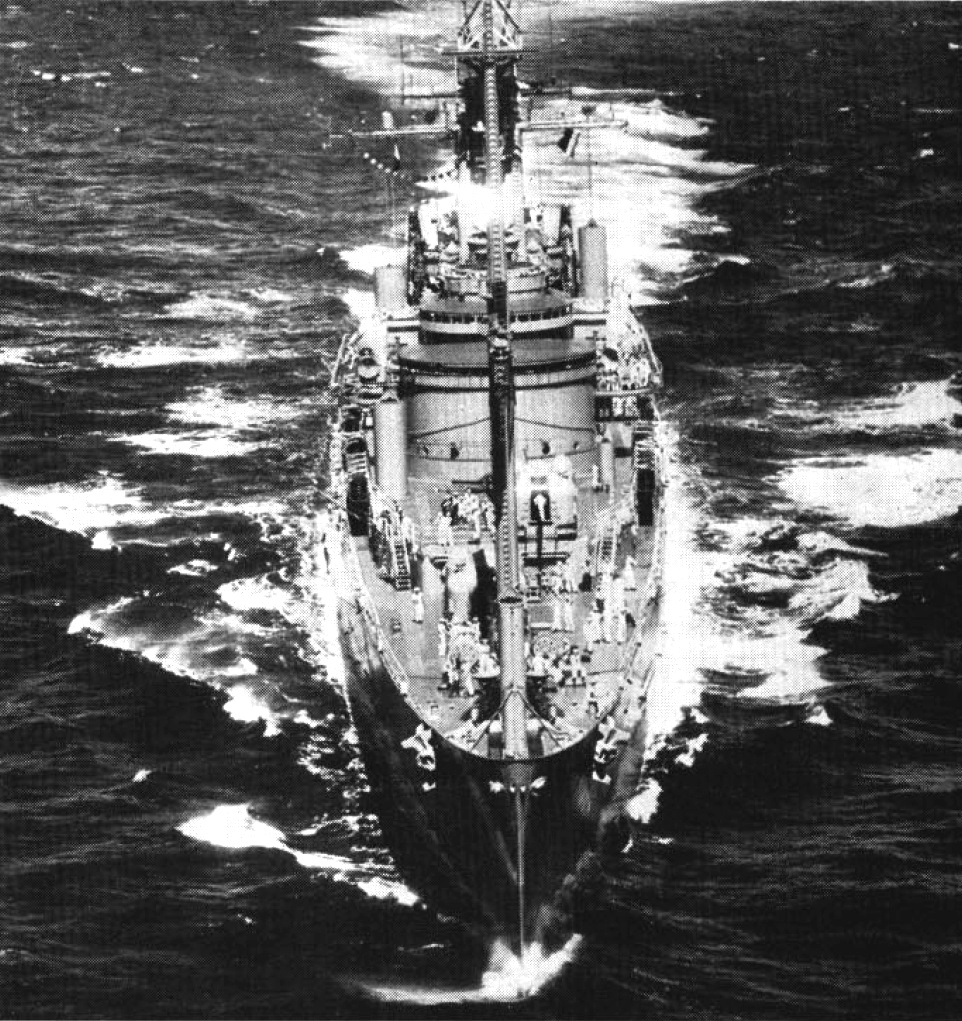
Bow view of Northampton in 1958.

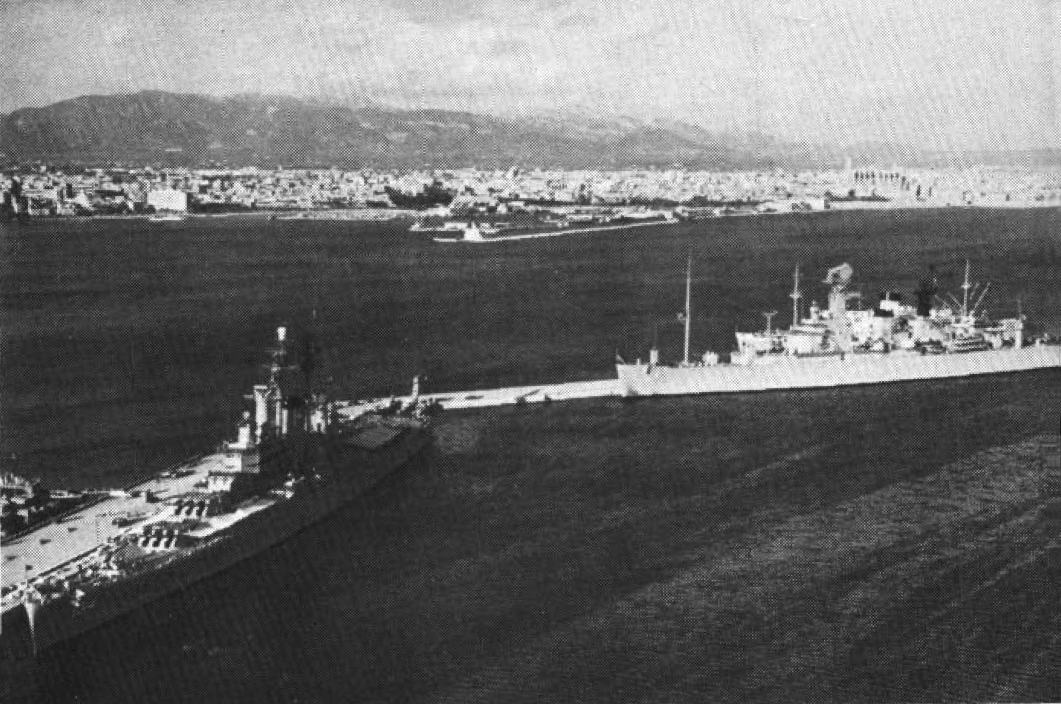
Northampton and Des Moines at Mallorca c. 1960.

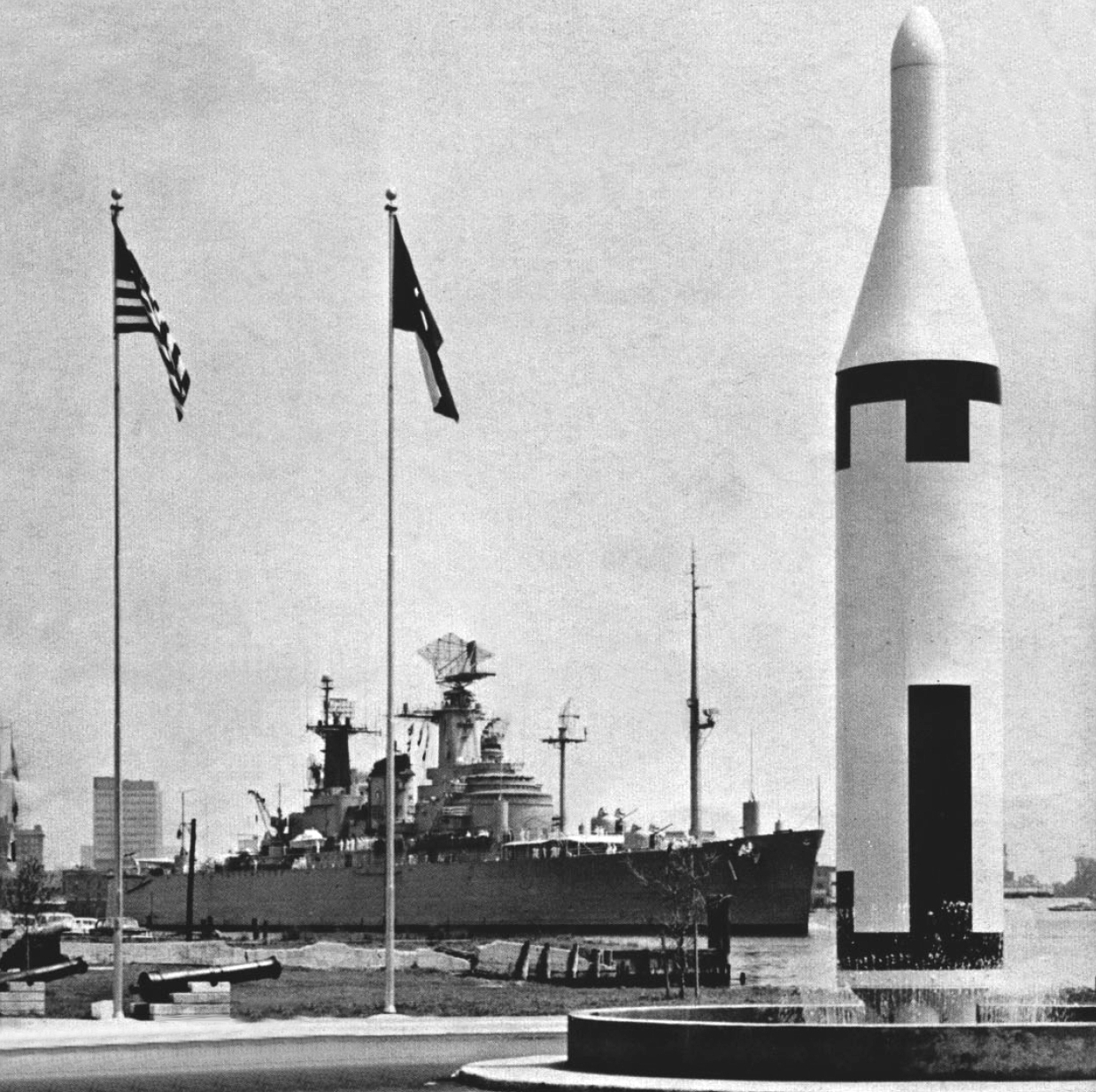
Northampton with Polaris Missile fountain at Portsmouth, Virginia c. 1962.

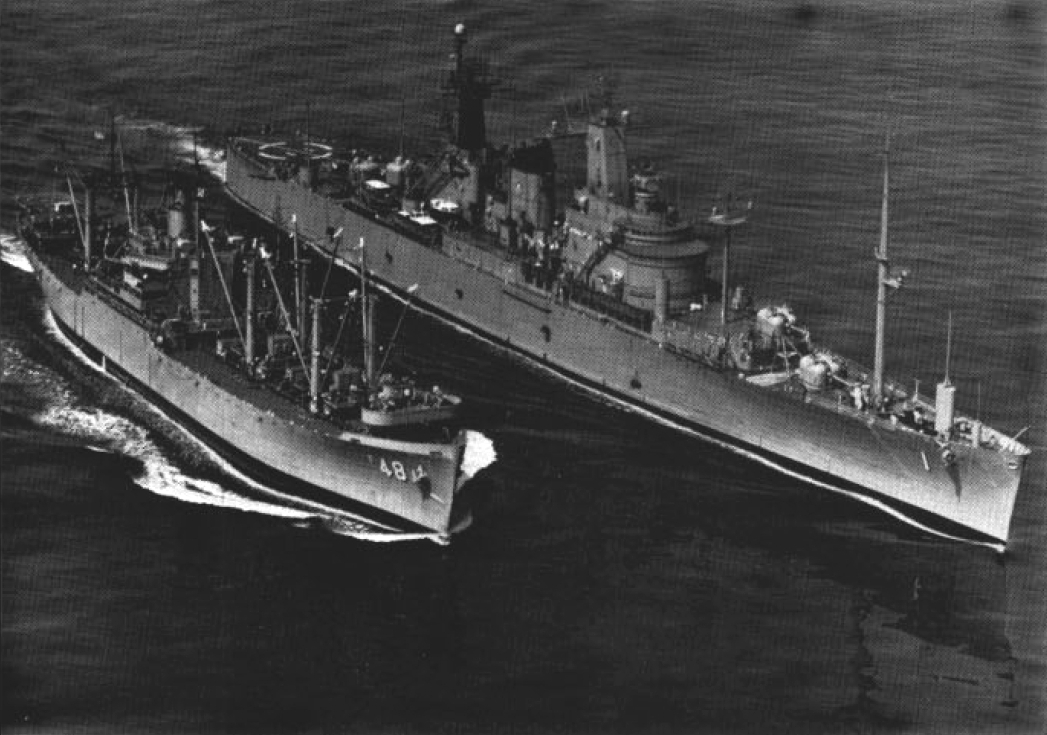
Northampton replenishing with Alsfeld c. 1964.

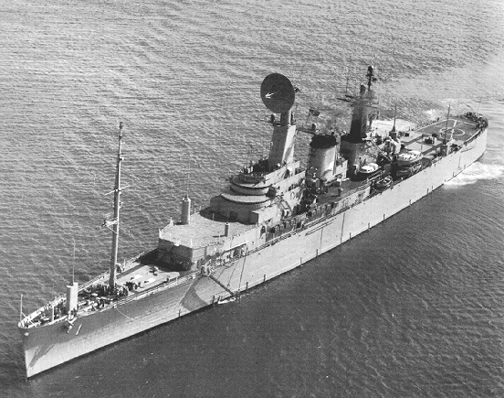
Northampton in her final configuration before decommissioning around early 1970.

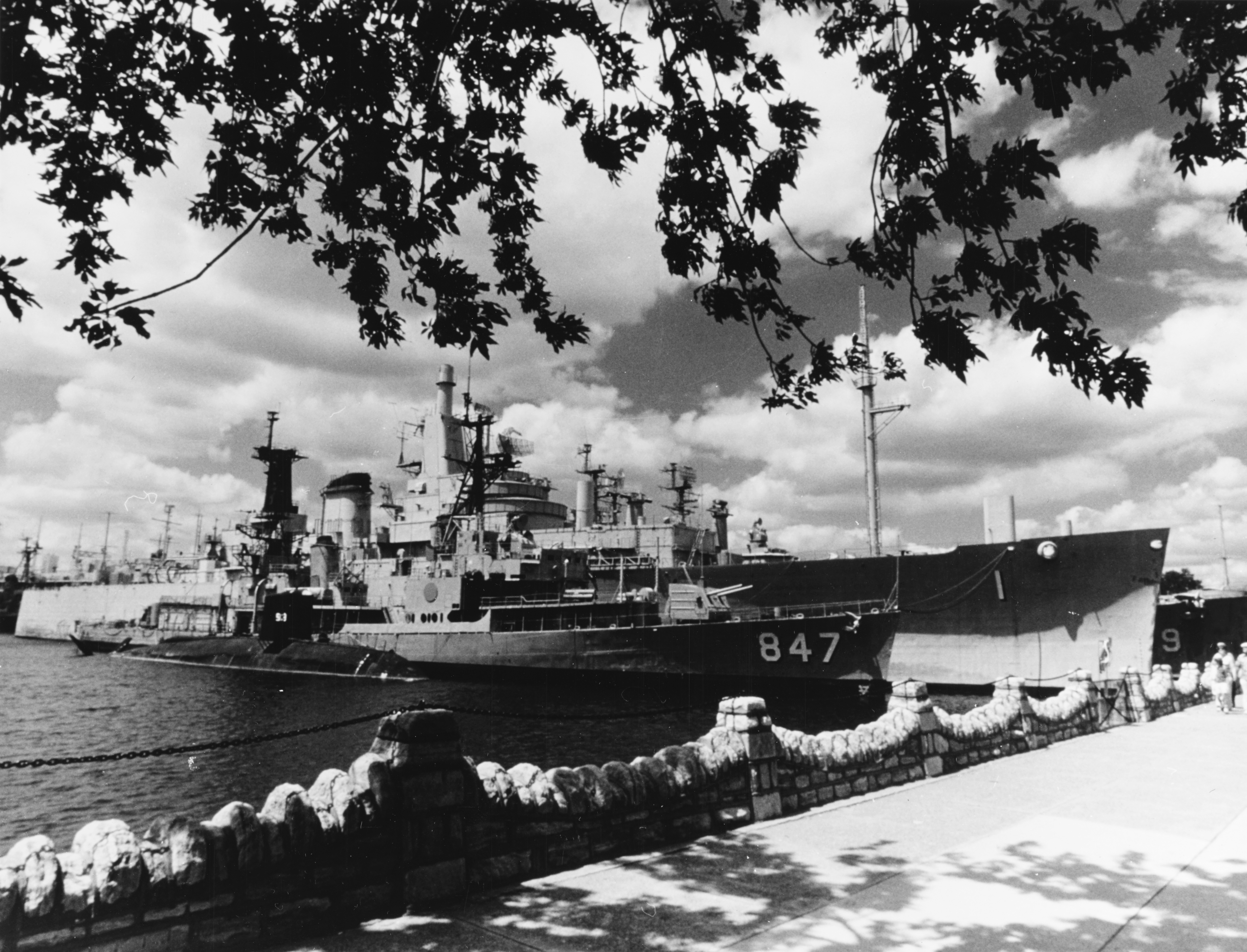
Northampton, Robert L. Wilson and Albacore mothballed at Philadelphia Naval Shipyard in August 1976.

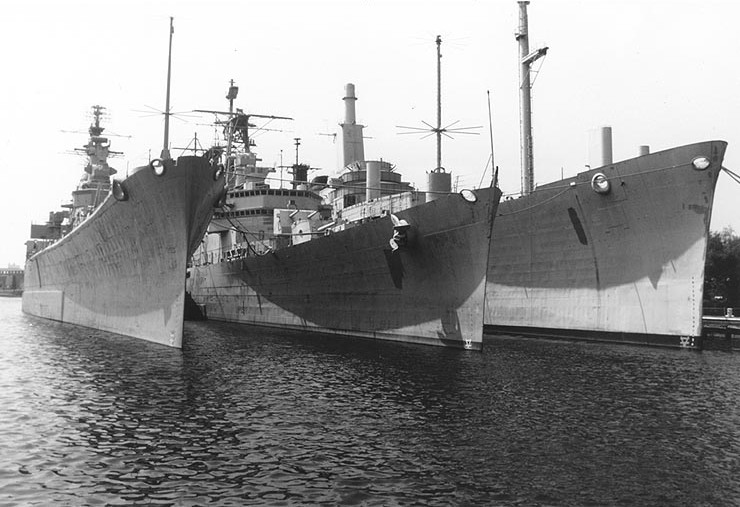
Northampton, Springfield and Newport News await disposal at Philadelphia Naval Yard in October 1978.

== Awards ==
- Navy Expeditionary Medal
- National Defense Service Medal with 2 awards

== See also ==
- USS Saipan (CVL-48)
- USS Wright (CVL-49)
