= Bobby Wilson =

Bobby Wilson may refer to:

- Bobby Wilson (actor), artist and writer, member of the sketch comedy troupe, the 1491s
- Bobby Wilson (tennis) (1935–2020), British tennis player of the 1950s and 1960s
- Bobby Wilson (Australian rules footballer) (1934–2003), Australian rules footballer for Fitzroy
- Bobby Wilson (footballer, born 1943) (1943–2026), Scottish footballer (Dundee FC)
- Bobby Wilson (footballer, born 1944), English footballer
- Bobby Wilson (Hibernian footballer) (1890–1918), American soccer player
- Bobby Wilson (basketball, born 1944), American professional basketball player in the ABA
- Bobby Wilson (basketball, born 1951), American professional basketball player in the NBA
- Bobby Wilson (defensive tackle) (born 1968), American football player
- Bobby Wilson (racing driver) (born 1981), American racecar driver
- Bobby Wilson (baseball) (born 1983), American baseball player
- Bobby Wilson (Arizona politician) (born 1944)
- Bobby Wilson (mathematician), American mathematician
- Robert Tudawali (1929–1967), Indigenous Australian actor and activist, also known as Bobby Wilson

== See also ==
- Robert Wilson (disambiguation)
- Bob Wilson (disambiguation)
