= Robert Willson =

Robert Willson may refer to:

- Robert Willson (artist) (1912–2000), American artist and sculptor notable for his creative use of solid glass
- Robert Willson (bishop) (1794–1866), English Roman Catholic Bishop of Hobart in Australia
- Bob Willson (1928–2019), TV host
- Robert Meredith Willson (1902–1984), American musician

== See also ==
- Robert Wilson (disambiguation)
