= Justin Paul (cricketer) =

New Zealand cricketer (born 1972)

Personal information
- Full name: Justin Matthew Paul
- Born: 17 November 1972 (age 53); Dunedin, Otago, New Zealand
- Batting: Right-handed
- Bowling: Right-arm offbreak
- Role: Bowler

Domestic team information
- Years: Team
- 1992/93–1994/95: Otago
- Source: CricInfo, 21 May 2016

Justin Mathew Paul (born 17 November 1972) is a New Zealand former cricketer. He played eight first-class and 12 List A matches for Otago between the 1992–93 and 1994–95 seasons.

Paul was born at Dunedin in 1972. His father, Russell, had played for Otago age-group sides and gone on to play Hawke Cup cricket for North Otago, and Justin played for New Zealand national age-group sides between 1990–91 and 1992–93 as well as for Canterbury under-20s, growing up in Timaru. He spent time on the Lord's ground staff in England during 1991 and played for Sussex County Cricket Club's second XI and played in England for two more summers during the early 1990s. Paul's maternal uncle, Bob Wilson had played representative cricket for Otago during the 1970s as well as playing Hawke Cup matches for North Otago.

Not able to gain selection for Canterbury, Paul accepted an offer to play for Otago in 1992. An off break bowler, he made his representative first-class debut for the side in November 1992, playing against Auckland at Sunnyvale Park in Dunedin. He scored 20 not out in his only innings and did not bowl in a drawn match. He went on to play for more first-class matches during the season, but from 1993 to 1994 played more frequently in one-day matches, playing 12 List A fixtures over two seasons but only appearing in three more first-class matches. In total he took six first-class and nine List A wickets and was replaced in the Otago side ahead of the 1995–96 season.

After leaving Otago Paul played club cricket for a number of years. He attended the University of Otago and captained the New Zealand Universities side. He has written for The Nightwatchman and has worked in education with adults and young people.
