= Crooked Tree (novel) =

Novel by Robert C. Wilson

First edition (publ. G. P. Putnam's Sons)

Crooked Tree is a novel by Robert C. Wilson published in 1980. Based on a Native American legend set in Northern Michigan, it contains suspense and horror scenes. Wilson just finished law school at the University of Michigan and was preparing for his bar exam when he wrote it.

The book was re-released in 2005 by the University of Michigan Press.
