= Robert Gordon Wilson =

Robert Gordon Wilson may refer to:

- Gordon Wilson (Scottish politician), (1938–2017), Scottish politician and solicitor
- Robert Gordon Wilson (architect) (1844–1931), Scottish architect

== See also ==
- Robert Wilson (disambiguation)
