= AN/SPS-2 =

US three-dimensional radar

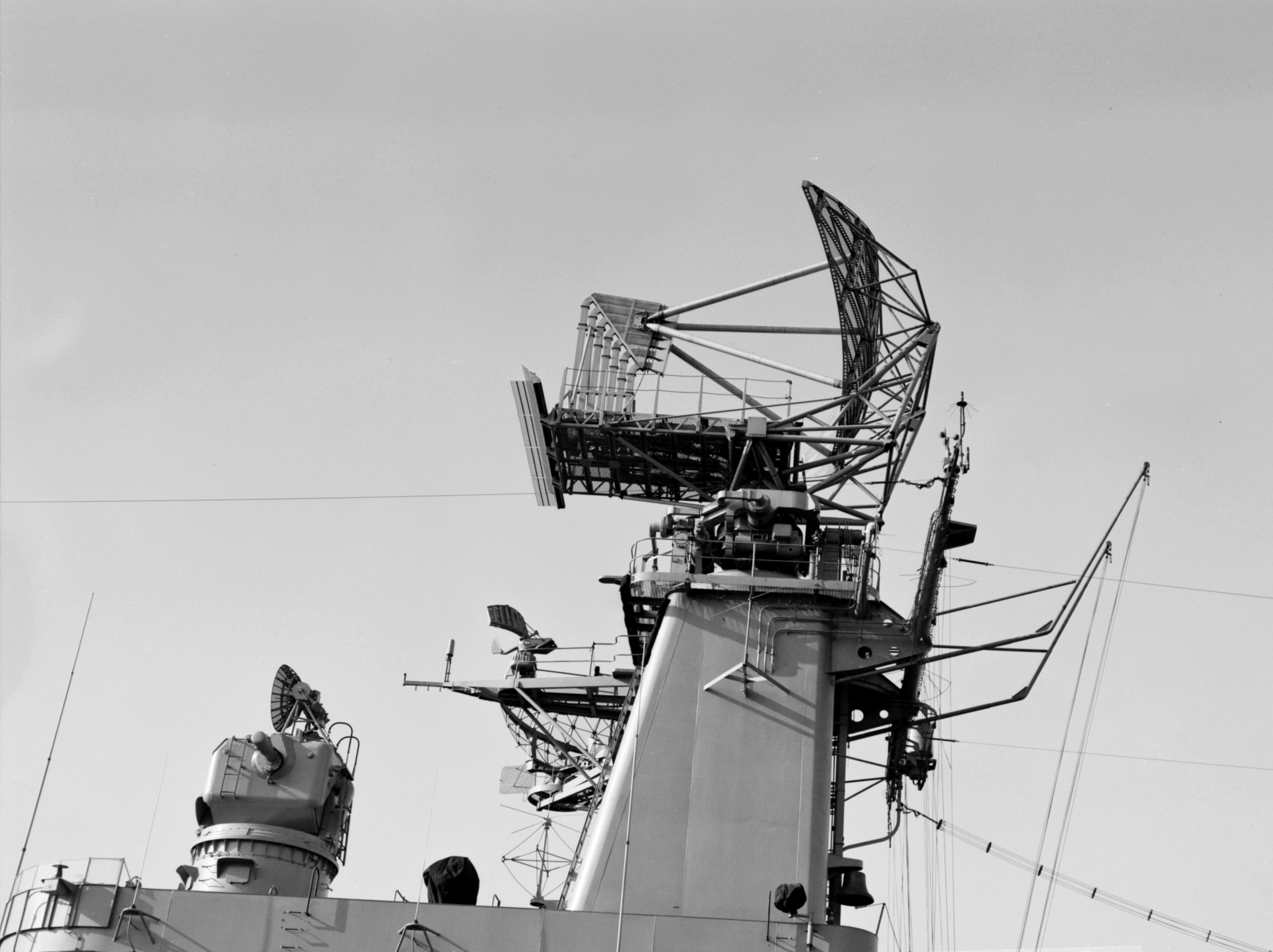
- AN/SPS-2 aboard USS Northampton
- Country of origin: United States
- Manufacturer: General Electric
- Introduced: 1953
- No. built: 2
- Type: 3D
- Frequency: L Band
- PRF: 240 Hz
- Beamwidth: 1.6° × 2.7°
- Pulsewidth: 6 µs
- Range: 620 km (330 nmi)
- Power: 10 kW

AN/SPS-2 is a three-dimensional radar manufactured by General Electric. It was used by the US Navy as a height finder radar after World War II, and was only used equipped aboard two naval vessels during the Cold War.

== AN/SPS-2 ==
It was only equipped aboard two ships which was USS Northampton and USS Little Rock as the radar alone weights 23.6 tons and while the whole system weights 44 tons. It was too heavy to be fitted aboard any destroyers, thus only used twice aboard cruisers.

Its first service started aboard USS Northampton, commissioned in 1953. The second radar was put in service aboard USS Little Rock in 1960, after she had completed her guided-missile cruiser conversion.

=== On board ships ===
- USS Northampton
- USS Little Rock

== Gallery ==
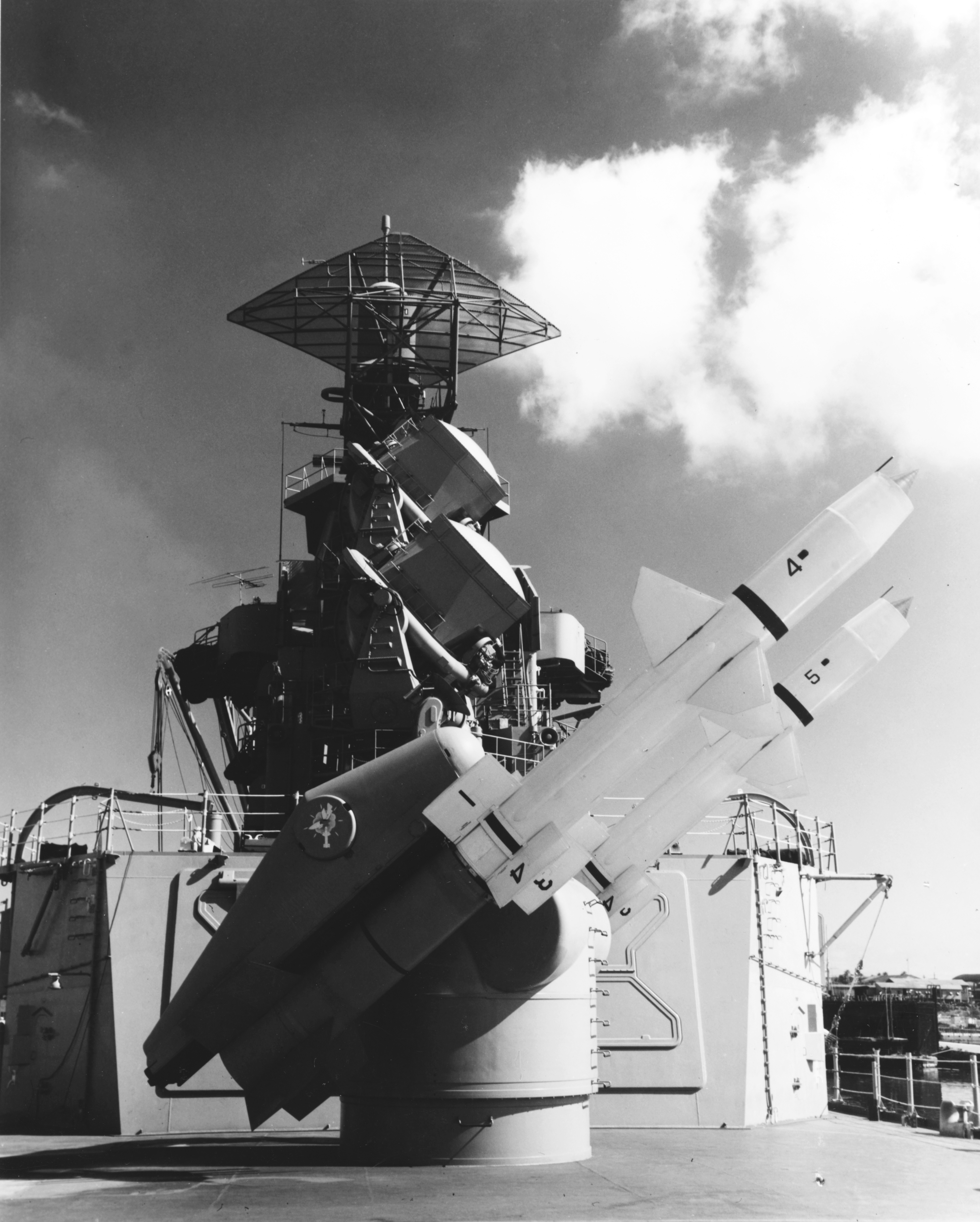
AN/SPS-2 aboard USS Little Rock

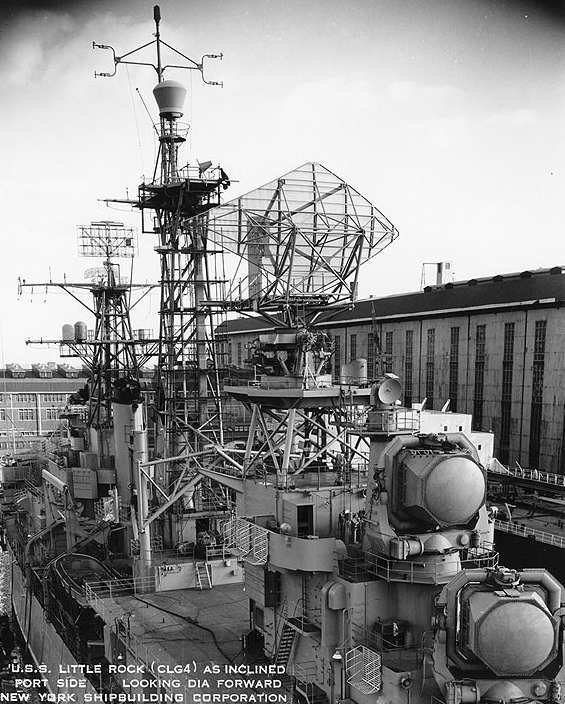

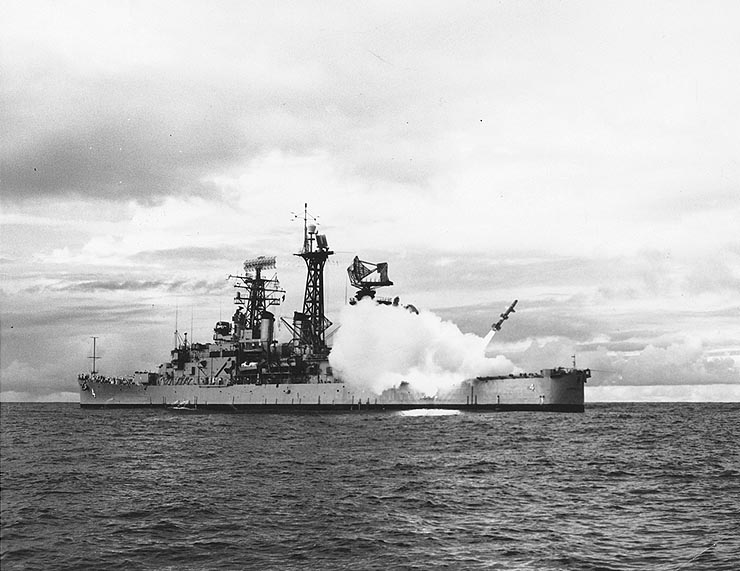

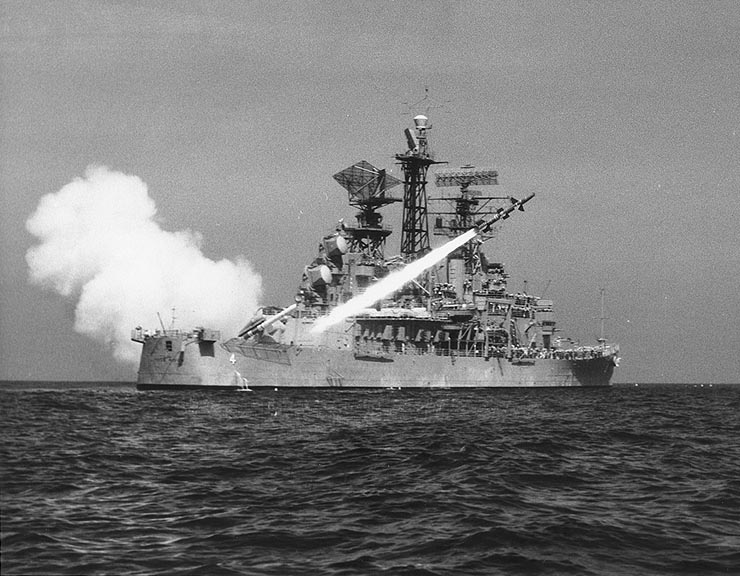

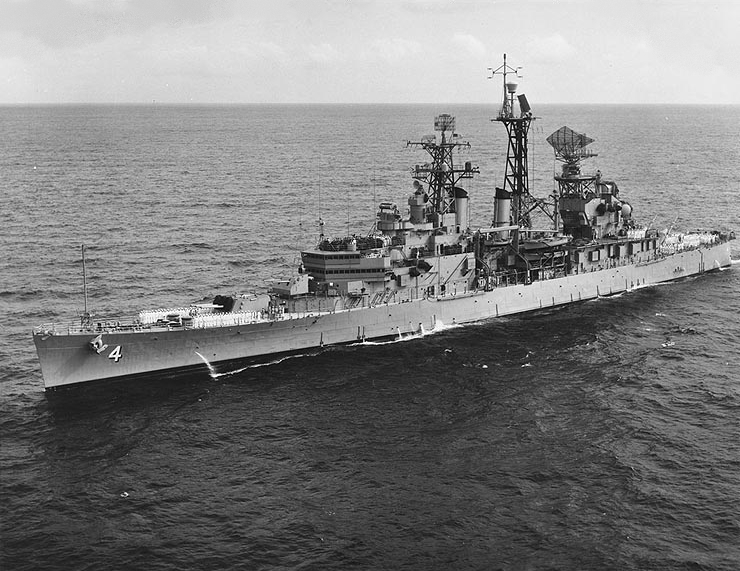

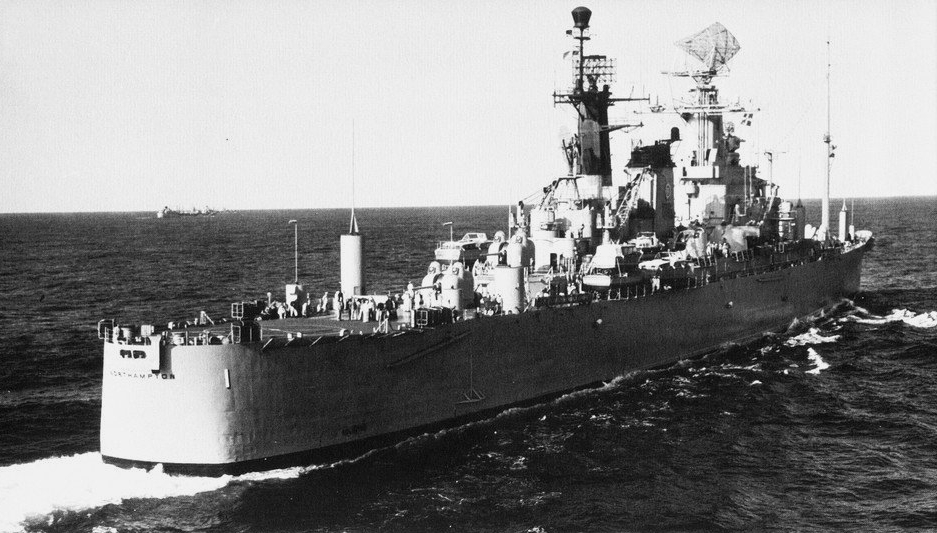
AN/SPS-2 aboard USS Northampton

== See More ==
- List of radars
- Radar configurations and types
- Height finder radar
