= Paul Skinner =

British businessman (1944–2024)

- Born: Paul David Skinner; 24 December 1944
- Died: 21 October 2024 (aged 79)
- Education: Cambridge University; Manchester Business School
- Occupation: Businessman
- Title: Chairman, Rio Tinto Group
- Term: 2003–2009
- Predecessor: Robert Wilson
- Successor: Jan du Plessis

Paul David Skinner, CBE (24 December 1944 – 21 October 2024) was a British businessman who was the chairman of the Rio Tinto Group from 2003 to 2009.

== Early life ==
Skinner was born in 1944 and earned a law degree from Cambridge University, followed by attending Manchester Business School.

== Career ==
He first worked for Shell as a student in 1963, rising to managing director, but lost out to Sir Philip Watts in the contest to become its chairman.

In November 2003, Skinner was appointed chairman of Rio Tinto Group, succeeding Sir Robert Wilson. In 2009, he was succeeded by Jan du Plessis.

== Personal life and death ==
Skinner was married and had two sons. He died from cancer on 21 October 2024, at the age of 79.

== Honours ==
Skinner was appointed CBE in the 2014 New Year Honours.
