= Robert Lee Wilson =

Robert Lee Wilson may refer to:

- Robert L. Wilson (1920–1944), United States Marine and Medal of Honor recipient
- Robert E. Lee Wilson (1865–1933), American cotton planter
