= Bob Wilson (footballer, born August 1898) =

Australian rules footballer

Personal information
- Full name: Robert Hope Wilson
- Born: 12 August 1898; Macorna, Victoria
- Died: 26 December 1986 (aged 88); Elsternwick, Victoria
- Original team: Kerang
- Height: 173 cm (5 ft 8 in)
- Weight: 66 kg (146 lb)

Playing career^{1}
Years	Club	Games (Goals)
1923–1925	Carlton	25 (0)
- ^{1} Playing statistics correct to the end of 1925.

Robert Hope Wilson (12 August 1898 – 26 December 1986) was an Australian rules footballer who played with Carlton in the Victorian Football League (VFL). His son Kevin competed at the 1952 Summer Olympics in sailing.
