= Robert Wilson (British Army officer, born 1911) =

British army officer (1911–2002)

- Nickname: "Tug"
- Born: 4 November 1911; Bolton, Lancashire
- Died: April 2002 (aged 90) West Berkshire
- Allegiance: United Kingdom
- Branch: British Army
- Service years: 1939–1958
- Rank: Lieutenant-Colonel
- Service number: 97240
- Conflicts: Second World War; Palestine Emergency; Korean War
- Awards: Companion of the Distinguished Service Order and Bar, Efficiency Decoration, Mentioned in Dispatches

Lieutenant-Colonel Robert Wilson DSO* TD (4 November 1911 – April 2002) was a British Army officer of the Second World War. He escaped twice from captivity, having been taken and becoming a prisoner of war.

== Military career ==
Wilson worked as a draughtsman for the Bristol Aeroplane Company and served as a gunner in the Territorial Army, before commissioning into the 5th Survey Regiment of the Royal Regiment of Artillery on 2 September 1939.

He served in the Battle of France with the 3rd Survey Regiment, Royal Artillery before being evacuated from Dunkirk. In November 1940 he joined a 'Folbot' section of No. 8 (Guards) Commando and saw service in the Middle East. In April 1941 he was a founder member of Roger Courtney's Special Boat Service (SBS) and participated in operations in the Mediterranean and North Africa. In February 1942 he was awarded the Distinguished Service Order for his role in six SBS raids in Egypt and Libya. In September 1942 he was captured during an operation in Italy and was marked for transportation to a German prisoner of war camp, but successfully escaped at Modena station. Wilson was recaptured in Rome on 8 January 1944 and held at Stalag IV-B. He was later transferred to Oflag VIII-F and then to Oflag 79, which was liberated by US forces on 12 April 1945. On 20 December 1945 he was awarded a Bar to his DSO is recognition for his actions during and after his capture.

Between February 1946 and September 1947, Wilson served as Battery Commander, 66th Airborne Anti-Tank Regiment Royal Artillery in Palestine during the Palestine Emergency. He then returned to UK and served as a Battery Commander in heavy anti-aircraft and light anti-aircraft regiments and then as a Staff Officer Royal Artillery at the Army Air Transport Development Centre. From 1951 to 1953 Wilson was a Battery Commander in the 14th Regiment Royal Artillery, and served in the Korean War. On 24 April 1953 he was Mentioned in Dispatches. Between 1953 and 1956 he was Second-in-Command of the 38th Training Regiment RA in North Wales, before serving as Commanding Officer of the 37th Heavy Anti-Aircraft Regiment RA in Malta. Wilson retired from the regular army in April 1958 with the rank of lieutenant colonel.

Wilson was the subject of a 1985 book by Rex Woods, called Special Commando : the wartime adventures of Lt-Col Robert Wilson, DSO and Bar.
