= Robert L. Wilson (politician) =

American politician (1805–1880)

Robert L. Wilson (September 11, 1805 – March 7, 1880) was an American politician from Pennsylvania. Coming to Ohio at a young age, Wilson attended Franklin College then studied law. After he was admitted to the bar, he moved to Athens, Illinois, and was elected to the Illinois House of Representatives. he then moved to Sterling, Illinois, where he was clerk of the circuit court and Probate Judge. During the Civil War, Wilson first defended Washington, D.C., then raised a company of volunteers before being appointed a paymaster.

== Biography ==
Robert L. Wilson was born in Washington County, Pennsylvania, on September 11, 1805. In 1810, his family moved west to Zanesville, Ohio, where Wilson was raised. Following his father's death in 1821, Wilson took a job teaching school so that he could save up money to attend college. He enrolled in Franklin College in New Athens, Ohio, studying for four years. Upon graduating in 1831, he moved to Kentucky to study law and teach at a private school.

After Wilson was admitted to the bar, he moved to Athens, Illinois. In 1836, he was elected to the Illinois House of Representatives for a two-year term. He was part of the "Long Nine" of Whig assemblymen of Sangamon County; all seven representatives, including Abraham Lincoln, and both senators were of the party. This session is notable in Sangamon County history as the session where the state capital was moved to Springfield. He moved to Sterling, Illinois, in 1840, and was soon elected clerk of the circuit court. He served in this role in five terms until 1860. During eight of those years, Wilson also served as a Probate Judge.

Upon the outbreak of the Civil War, Wilson enlisted in the Clay Guard, led by Cassius Marcellus Clay. This group patrolled Washington, D.C. The group was relieved upon the arrival of the 7th New York Volunteer Infantry Regiment. Wilson returned to Sterling and aided in the raising of Company A of the 34th Illinois Volunteer Infantry Regiment. He was offered a captaincy of the company, but declined. Wilson returned to Washington and offered his services to President Lincoln, who appointed him a paymaster. Wilson was charged with receiving and dispersing $7 million to military operations. He was promoted to Colonel in 1863 and was mustered out in 1865.

Wilson married Eliza J. Kincaid on March 28, 1833. He took a long European trip in 1875. He died in Whiteside County, Illinois, on March 7, 1880. He was buried in Riverside Cemetery in Sterling.
