= Bob Wilson (New Zealand footballer) =

New Zealand footballer

Personal information
- Full name: Robert Wilson
- Place of birth: Falkirk, Scotland
- Height: 5 ft 9 in (1.75 m)
- Position: Right winger

Senior career*
Years	Team	Apps	(Gls)
- Wigram

International career
1948	New Zealand	1	(0)
- * Club domestic league appearances and goals

Robert Wilson is a former football (soccer) player who represented New Zealand at international level.

Wilson made a solitary official international appearance for the All Whites in a 0–4 loss to Australia on 4 September 1948.
