= Obadiah Rich (silversmith) =

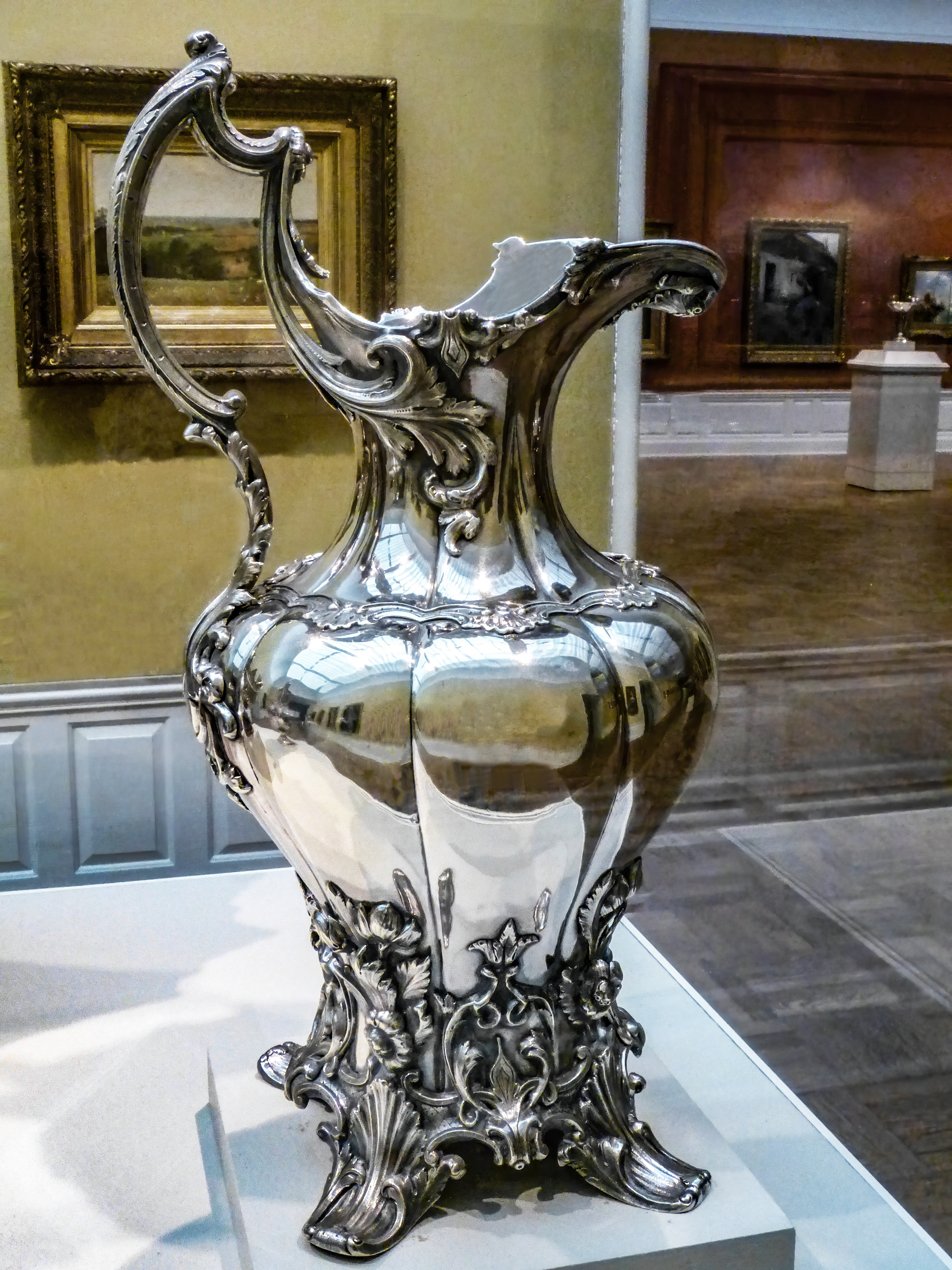
Water jug, 1845-1850

Obadiah Rich (August 17, 1809 – July 6, 1888) was a noted American silversmith, active in Boston.

Rich was born in Charlestown, Massachusetts, and apprenticed to Moses Morse (w. 1815–1830) in Boston. In 1830 he opened his own shop at 69 Washington Street. In 1835 he and his partner, Samuel L. Ward, exhibited a monumental vase honoring Daniel Webster, but during the next decade he appears to have worked alone. In this time he created a half-size version of the Warwick Vase and the Britannia Cup, given by Boston's citizens to Samuel Cunard for establishing the first transatlantic mail steamship between Liverpool and Boston. He also was recorded in one advertisement that ran from April 14 to May 4, 1840, in the Boston Daily Evening Transcript: "Daguerreotype Plates made and for sale by O. Rich, Court Avenue."

The Boston Evening Transcript of July 3, 1840, described Rich as "well known to our citizens as the best silver plate worker — taking the elegant and ornamental, with the useful and substantial — that we have in Boston. It would be hard for New York or Philadelphia to indicate his superior." By 1844, judges for the Massachusetts Charitable Mechanic Association exhibition praised his "elegant specimens of Ornamental Silver Ware [as] in style and finish equal in all respects to the same class of English manufacture; and in every way highly creditable to this celebrated manufacturer."

Most unfortunately, he was struck by blindness which brought his career to an end in 1849. He died nearly 40 years later and is buried in the Woodbrook Cemetery in Woburn, Massachusetts.

His work is collected in the Art Institute of Chicago, Clark Art Institute, Museum of Fine Arts, Boston, Portland Art Museum
