= Bob Wilson (footballer, born 1907) =

Australian rules footballer, born 1907

Personal information
- Full name: Bob Wilson
- Born: 21 September 1907
- Died: 15 September 1982 (aged 74)
- Original team: Elsternwick

Playing career^{1}
Years	Club	Games (Goals)
1929	Richmond	1 (0)
- ^{1} Playing statistics correct to the end of 1929.

Bob Wilson (21 September 1907 – 15 September 1982) was a former Australian rules footballer who played with Richmond in the Victorian Football League (VFL).
