= Bobby Wilson (Australian rules footballer) =

Australian rules footballer

Personal information
- Full name: Bobby Wilson
- Born: 29 November 1934
- Died: 17 September 2003 (aged 68)
- Original team: Brunswick
- Height: 171 cm (5 ft 7 in)
- Weight: 67 kg (148 lb)

Playing career^{1}
Years	Club	Games (Goals)
1955	Fitzroy	3 (1)
- ^{1} Playing statistics correct to the end of 1955.

Bobby Wilson (29 November 1934 – 17 September 2003) was a former Australian rules footballer who played with Fitzroy in the Victorian Football League (VFL).
