= Robert & William Wilson =

American silversmiths (in partnership 1825–1846)

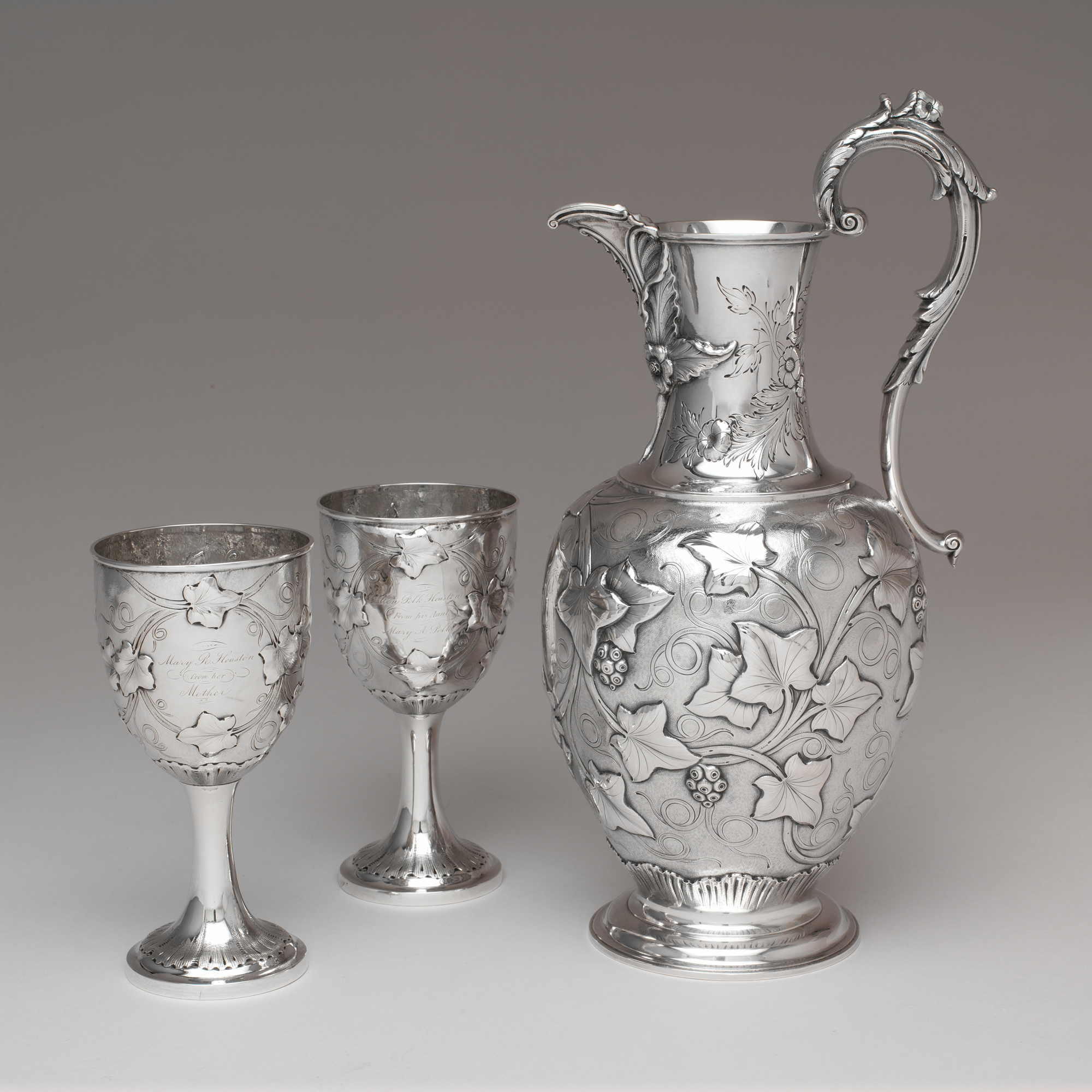
Pitcher and goblets by Robert & William Wilson, circa 1845

Robert & William Wilson were American silversmiths in Philadelphia, active in partnership from roughly 1825–1846, then continuing as a mark until 1877. It was succeeded by William Wilson & Son.

Robert and William Wilson were brothers. Robert, the elder, started making silver at 25 Dey Street, New York City, in 1803. By 1812 he apparently worked in Philadelphia, and was joined by William in 1825. They helped champion the Rococo Revival style. After Robert died in 1846, the company continued to mark goods as R & W Wilson for another 30 years. Around 1860 its factory was located at the northwest corner of Fifth and Cherry Streets. In 1877 the firm was disbanded and Wm Wilson & Son was first listed in the Philadelphia "Jewelers, Silversmiths & Watchmakers Directory." This firm continued operation until 1909. Notable Philadelphia silversmith Peter L. Krider worked as an apprentice and a journeyman with the firm of Robert & William Wilson.

Their work is collected in the Cooper Hewitt, Museum of Fine Arts, Boston, Metropolitan Museum of Art, and Museum of Early Southern Decorative Arts.
