= Bob Wilson (footballer, born 1928) =

English footballer

Personal information
- Date of birth: 8 September 1928
- Place of birth: Liverpool, England
- Date of death: 17 August 2006 (aged 77)
- Place of death: Upton, Wirral, England
- Position: Full back

Youth career
- Burscough

Senior career*
Years	Team	Apps	(Gls)
1952–1962	Preston North End	91	(0)
1962–1964	Tranmere Rovers	54	(0)
- New Brighton
Total		145	(0)
- * Club domestic league appearances and goals

Bob Wilson (8 September 1928 – 17 August 2006) was a footballer who played as a full back in the Football League for Tranmere Rovers.
