= Robert Wilson (businessman, born 1943) =

- Born: September 1943
- Occupation: Businessman
- Known for: Former chairman of Rio Tinto Group and of BG Group

Sir Robert Peter Wilson KCMG (born September 1943) is a British businessman. He has been the chairman of Rio Tinto Group and of BG Group.

Wilson started his career with Mobil, and then Dunlop Tyres, before joining the mining company Rio Tinto in 1970. He rose to chief executive in 1991. RTZ merged with CRA to form Rio Tinto in 1996, and he became deputy chairman. He was executive chairman from 1999 to 2003. He retired in October 2003 with a £656,000 annual pension, and "one of the largest pension pots enjoyed by UK directors, with a transfer value of £14.6m", and was succeeded by Paul Skinner.

In 2004, Wilson became non-executive chairman BG Group, having been a non-executive director since 2002. In 2005, The Times included him at #28 in its Power 100 list.

Wilson was a non-executive director of Boots from 1991 to 1998, and of GlaxoSmithKline from 2003.

In 2010, he become the first patron of the University of Dundee's Centre for Energy, Petroleum and Mineral Law and Policy (CEPMLP).

== Honours ==
Wilson was appointed a KCMG by the UK government.
