= Robert Wilson (cricketer, born 1916) =

Scottish cricketer

Personal information
- Full name: Robert Wilson
- Born: 8 April 1916; Edinburgh, Midlothian, Scotland
- Died: 10 November 2004 (aged 88); Perth, Perthshire, Scotland
- Batting: Right-handed
- Bowling: Right-arm fast-medium

Domestic team information
- Years: Team
- 1952: Scotland

Career statistics
Competition	First-class
Matches	3
Runs scored	5
Batting average	5.00
100s/50s	–/–
Top score	4
Balls bowled	420
Wickets	8
Bowling average	20.87
5 wickets in innings	–
10 wickets in match	–
Best bowling	2/16
Catches/stumpings	1/–
- Source: Cricinfo, 4 July 2022

Robert Wilson (8 April 1916 — 10 November 2004) was a Scottish first-class cricketer.

Wilson was born at Edinburgh in April 1916 and was educated at the North District School. A club cricketer for Perthshire Cricket Club, Wilson made his debut for Scotland in first-class cricket against Yorkshire at Glasgow in 1952. He made a further two first-class appearances for Scotland in that year, against Ireland at Paisley and Worcestershire at Worcester on Scotland's tour of England. Playing as a right-arm fast-medium bowler, he took 8 wickets at an average of 20.87, with best figures of 2 for 16. As a lower order batsman, he scored 5 runs. By profession, he was a sports shop manager. Wilson died at Perth in November 2004.
