= Robert Wilson (ship captain) =

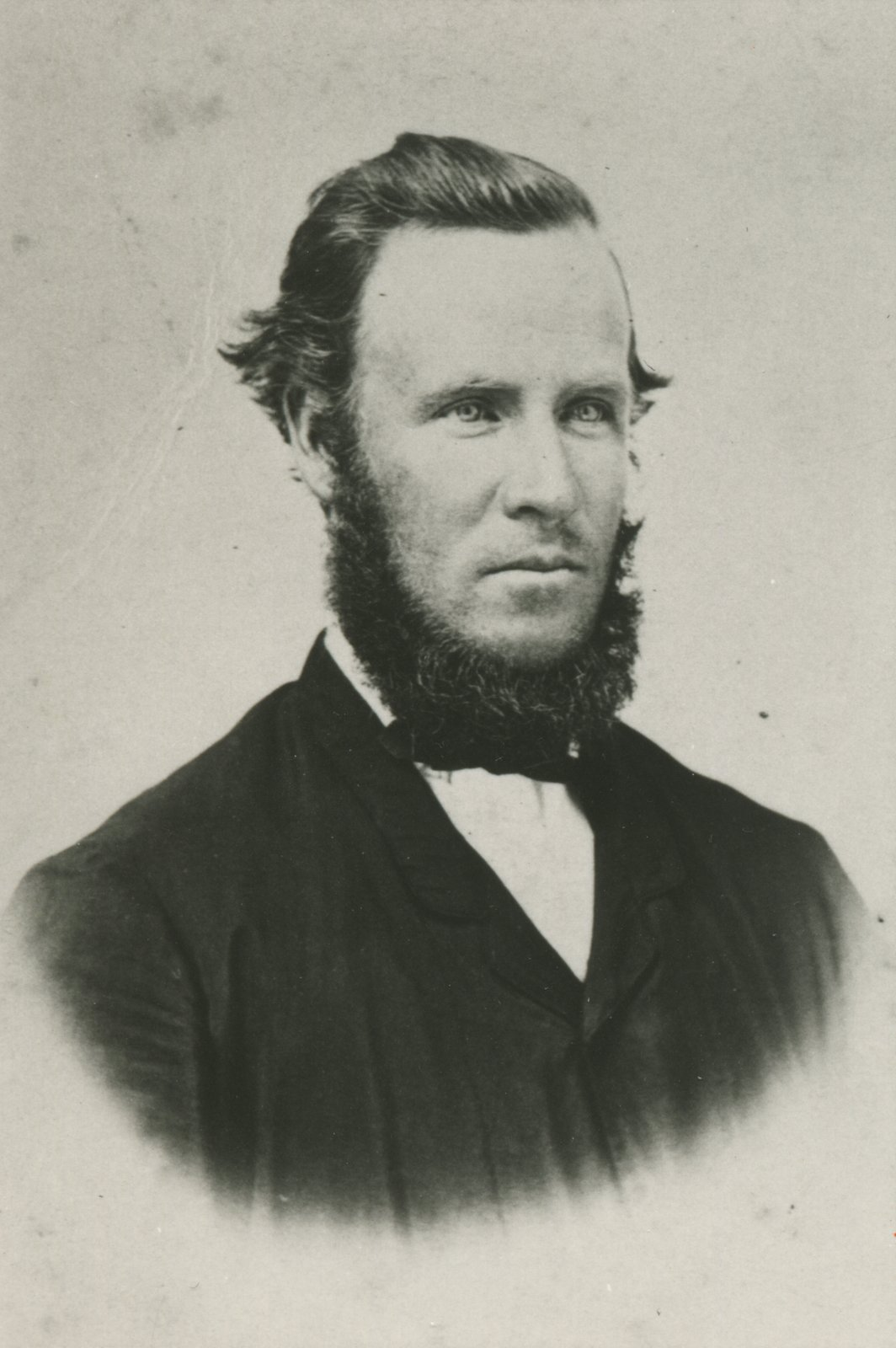
- Born: 1806; Ireland
- Died: 1888 (aged 81–82)
- Occupation: Ship Captain
- Known for: Helping escaped slaves to freedom

Robert Wilson (1806 – 1888) was a Great Lakes ship captain operating out of Oakville, Province of Canada who helped black slaves from the United States escape to freedom as part of the Underground Railroad.

Wilson was born in Ireland. His mother moved the family to Canada in 1817 after the death of her husband.

Wilson was the master of the Lady Colborne, a schooner that shipped grain on the Great Lakes. Slaves would be picked up from Ashtabula, Ohio and hidden in the hold with grain shipments. Following the American Civil War, African Americans in the Oakville area celebrated Emancipation Day at George's Square in the town, and would also visit the home of Wilson. The home at 279 Lawson St. was known as the "Mariner's Home" as it was open to ill and homeless sailors during the winter.

The Captain R. Wilson Public School is named in his honour.

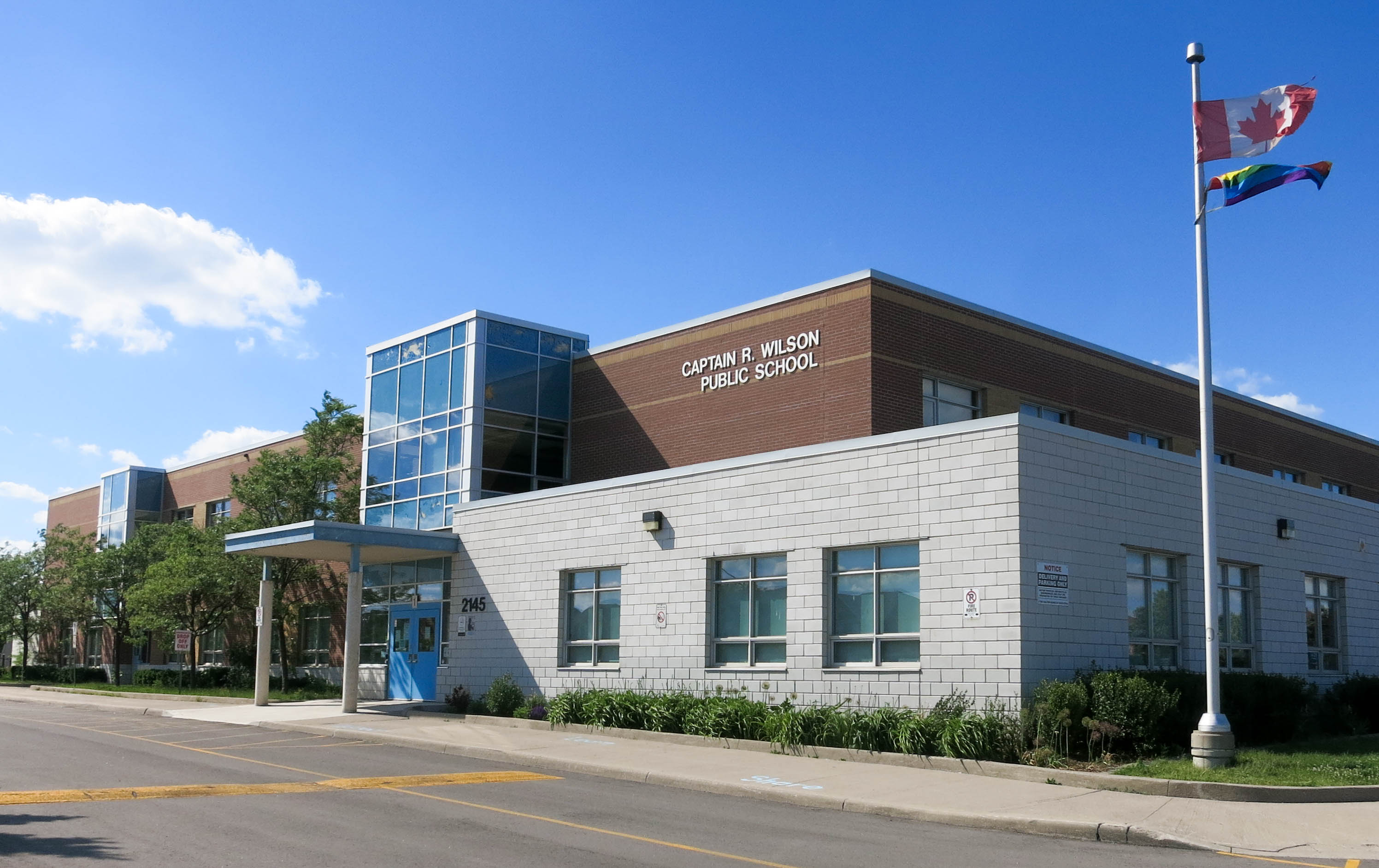
Captain R. Wilson Public School
