= Robert Wilson (merchant) =

Robert Wilson (1832–1899) was a New Zealand merchant and company director. He was born in Omagh, County Tyrone, Ireland in 1832. Wilson had married Eliza Jane Thomson at Upper Derriwell, Victoria, on 15 July 1862; they had three daughters and two sons. He retired in February 1895 and control of his firm passed to his elder son Leslie Robert, in partnership with T. S. Culling. Robert Wilson died on 19 August 1899 at his home in George Street, Dunedin, after an illness of about eight months; he was buried in the Southern cemetery.
