= Robert Wilson (cricketer, born 1948) =

New Zealand cricketer

Bob Wilson
Personal information
- Full name: Robert Stanley Wilson
- Born: 1 October 1948 (age 78); Balclutha, Otago, New Zealand
- Batting: Right-handed
- Role: Batsman
- Relatives: Justin Paul (nephew)

Domestic team information
- Years: Team
- 1968/69–1983/84: North Otago
- 1971/72–1978/79: Otago
- Source: CricInfo, 28 May 2016

Robert Stanley Wilson (born 1 October 1948) is a New Zealand former cricketer. He played two first-class matches for Otago, one in each of the 1971–72 and 1978–79 seasons.

Wilson was born at Balclutha in 1948. He played in North Otago's first Hawke Cup challenge match in December 1968 before playing for Otago age-group sides later in the season. Wilson played for North Otago until the 1980s scoring 2,775 runs for the side, a total which saw him remain as the highest run scorer for North Otago until the 2019–20 season.

Despite his run scoring record for North Otago, Wilson played only twice for the Otago representative side. His debut came in a February 1972 match against the New Zealand under-23 side, with Wilson scoring 62 runs in his only innings. He made his second and final first-class appearance in the 1978–79 Plunket Shield final match, scoring 11 runs in Otago's first innings score of 543 for eight declared as the province won the match and the Shield.
