= USS Robert L. Wilson =

Gearing-class destroyer

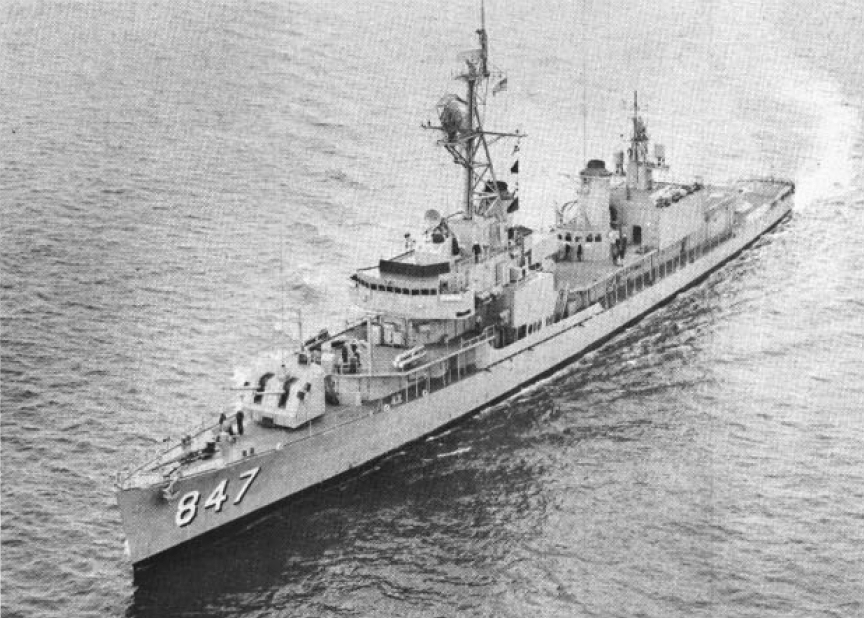
- USS Robert L. Wilson in 1964

History

United States
- Name: USS Robert L. Wilson
- Namesake: Robert L. Wilson
- Builder: Bath Iron Works, Bath, Maine
- Laid down: 2 July 1945
- Launched: 5 January 1946
- Commissioned: 28 March 1946
- Decommissioned: 30 September 1974
- Reclassified: DDE-847, 4 March 1950; DD-847, 1 August 1962
- Stricken: 30 September 1974
- Identification: Callsign: NBCE; Hull number: DD-847
- Nickname(s): "The Willy Boat"
- Fate: Sunk as a target, 1 March 1980

General characteristics
- Class & type: Gearing-class destroyer
- Displacement: 3,460 long tons (3,516 t) full
- Length: 390 ft 6 in (119.02 m)
- Beam: 40 ft 10 in (12.45 m)
- Draft: 14 ft 4 in (4.37 m)
- Propulsion: Geared turbines, 2 shafts, 60,000 shp (45 MW)
- Speed: 35 knots (65 km/h; 40 mph)
- Range: 4,500 nmi (8,300 km) at 20 kn (37 km/h; 23 mph)
- Complement: 336
- Armament: 6 × 5"/38 caliber guns; 12 × 40 mm AA guns; 11 × 20 mm AA guns; 10 × 21 inch (533 mm) torpedo tubes; 6 × depth charge projectors; 2 × depth charge tracks

USS Robert L. Wilson (DD/DDE-847) was a Gearing-class destroyer of the United States Navy, named for Marine Private First Class Robert L. Wilson (1920–1944), who was posthumously awarded the Medal of Honor for "conspicuous gallantry" in the Battle of Tinian.

Robert L. Wilson was laid down by the Bath Iron Works Corp., Bath, Maine, on 2 July 1945; launched on 5 January 1946; sponsored by Mrs. Joe Wilson; and commissioned in the Boston Navy Yard on 28 March 1946.

== Service history ==
=== 1946–1960 ===
Following shakedown in Cuban waters, Robert L. Wilson sailed from Norfolk, Virginia on 23 July 1946 for a six-month tour of duty with the 6th Fleet in the Mediterranean. Returning to the United States in February 1947, she spent the next two years based at Newport, Rhode Island, operating off the Atlantic Coast and in the Caribbean.

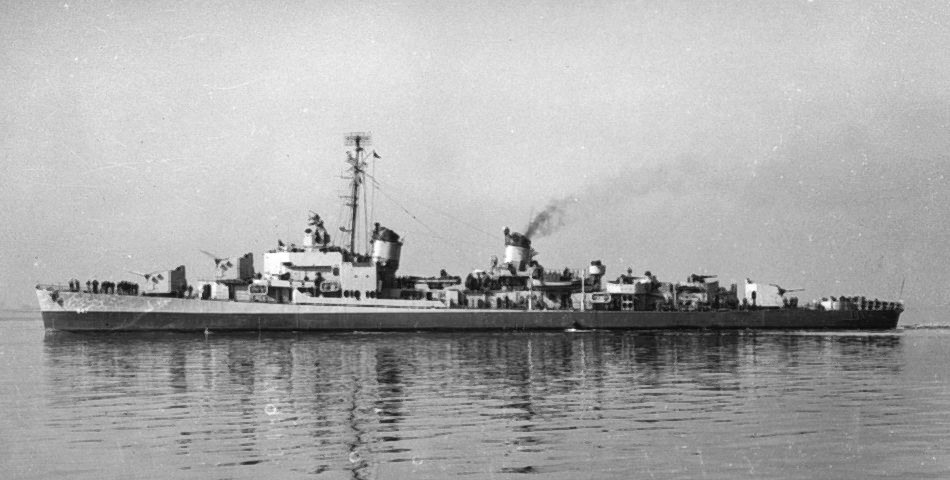
Robert L. Wilson in 1946.

After overhaul at Boston Navy Yard, she stood out of Hampton Roads on a midshipman cruise to Plymouth, England; Cherbourg, France; and Guantanamo Bay, Cuba. On 4 March 1950 Robert L. Wilson was redesignated an escort destroyer DDE-847. She finished out the year with a midshipman training cruise to Northern Europe, duty in the Mediterranean which included special antisubmarine warfare (ASW) demonstrations, and hunter-killer (HUK) operations along the eastern seaboard from Norfolk.

On 1 January 1951, as the result of a fleet reorganization, Robert L. Wilson became a unit of Escort Squadron 4 (CortRon 4), and hoisted the pennant of Commander, Escort Division 42. By 30 June 1960, she had completed eight tours of service in the Mediterranean since commissioning, provided training for cadets of the United States Military Academy along the eastern seaboard; and conducted the annual summer midshipmen cruises for the United States Naval Academy, stressing antisubmarine tactics.

On 1 July 1956, she was assigned to the newly established Destroyer Squadron 36 (DesRon 36), composed of destroyer escort types specially configured for anti-submarine missions and yet maintaining the capability to handle all destroyer missions. During the last week of November and the early part of December 1959, Robert L. Wilson and two other escort destroyers participated in Operation "Monsoon," manning sea-air rescue stations for the Presidential flight to Europe from the United States. She then operated in the western Atlantic and Caribbean until a Norfolk Navy Yard overhaul in the summer of 1960.

=== 1961–1974 ===
Returning to Caribbean and Atlantic operations, in January 1961 Robert L. Wilson pursued the Portuguese liner SS Santa Maria which had been seized by a group of revolutionaries. An eight-day chase took Wilson and Damato (DD-871) across the equator to Recife, Brazil. Returning to Norfolk, Robert L. Wilson underwent a month of preparation, then departed on 8 June for her ninth Mediterranean cruise. She spent the fall and winter of 1961 operating in the western Atlantic out of Norfolk.

In January 1962, Robert L. Wilson participated in recovery operations for a Project Mercury manned space capsule. Robert L. Wilson deployed with Task Group Bravo to Northern Europe in February, returning to Norfolk in mid-June 1962. On 1 August 1962 she was again classified DD-847. In September 1962, Wilson and the other ships of Destroyer Division 362 deployed to Guantanamo Bay, Cuba as a unit under the command of the Naval Base Commander for the purpose of base defense, and was at Guantanamo and in adjacent waters during the Cuban Missile Crisis in October. Robert L. Wilson returned to Norfolk in late November and operated locally until March 1963 when she entered the Philadelphia Navy Yard for a Fleet Rehabilitation and Modernization (FRAM) I modernization. Emerging from her overhaul period in 1964, she continued to serve with the Atlantic Fleet for the balance of that year and throughout 1965.

After serving as gunfire support ship at Guantanamo Bay, Cuba, in late January and early February 1966, Robert L. Wilson was assigned the abort station for the first unmanned Apollo space shot. In April and June she was rescue destroyer for Wasp (CVS-18), prime recovery ship for the Gemini 9 space mission. Following ASW exercises, she made her 12th deployment to the Mediterranean on 22 July 1966, returning to Norfolk 17 December. Following service as schoolship for the Fleet Sonar School in January and February, Wilson spent the rest of 1967 operating in the Atlantic and Caribbean.

Robert L. Wilson continued these operations until May 1968 when she joined the search for nuclear submarine Scorpion (SSN-589) searching the continental shelf off the coast of Norfolk and then following the Scorpion's track back to her last reported position southwest of the Azores without success. Returning to Norfolk on 13 June, Wilson operated in the Atlantic until steaming on 6 September for a western Pacific deployment.

Touching at San Diego, Pearl Harbor, Midway, Guam, and Subic Bay, Robert L. Wilson took up a naval gunfire support mission 36 miles (67 km) south of Huế, the ancient capital of South Vietnam. She then undertook search and rescue duty in the Gulf of Tonkin after 28 October, destroying two sampans with .50 caliber machine gun fire and hand grenades. In early November Robert L. Wilson was assigned as plane guard for Constellation (CVA-64) on "Yankee Station". She remained in the Far East through the end of the year.

Robert L. Wilson returned to San Diego from the Far East on 27 March 1969, and operated off the west coast until transiting the Panama Canal and arriving Norfolk on 21 June. She then operated in the western Atlantic and Caribbean participating in Operation SPRINGBOARD until deploying to the Mediterranean on 5 March 1970. During this Mediterranean cruise, Wilson participated in two combined NATO exercises, DAWN PATROL and MEDTACEX, and was, for a time, diverted to the Levantine Basin due to another Middle East crisis. She returned to Norfolk on 16 September for a leave, upkeep, and training cycle which continued to the end of the year.

Upon completion of overhaul, refresher training, and other operations in the Atlantic, Robert L. Wilson commenced another deployment to the Sixth Fleet, departing from Norfolk on 17 September. After six months away from Norfolk, she returned on 17 March 1972 and completed the year operating out of that port.

Robert L. Wilson decommissioned at Norfolk on 30 September 1974 and transferred to the inactive fleet facility at Philadelphia. She was struck from the Naval Vessel Register on 30 September 1974 and sunk as a target as part of the Harpoon missile test program on 1 March 1980.

== Awards ==
Robert L. Wilson earned three battle stars for service in the Vietnam War.

== See also ==
- List of ships sunk by missiles
