= Robert L. Wilson =

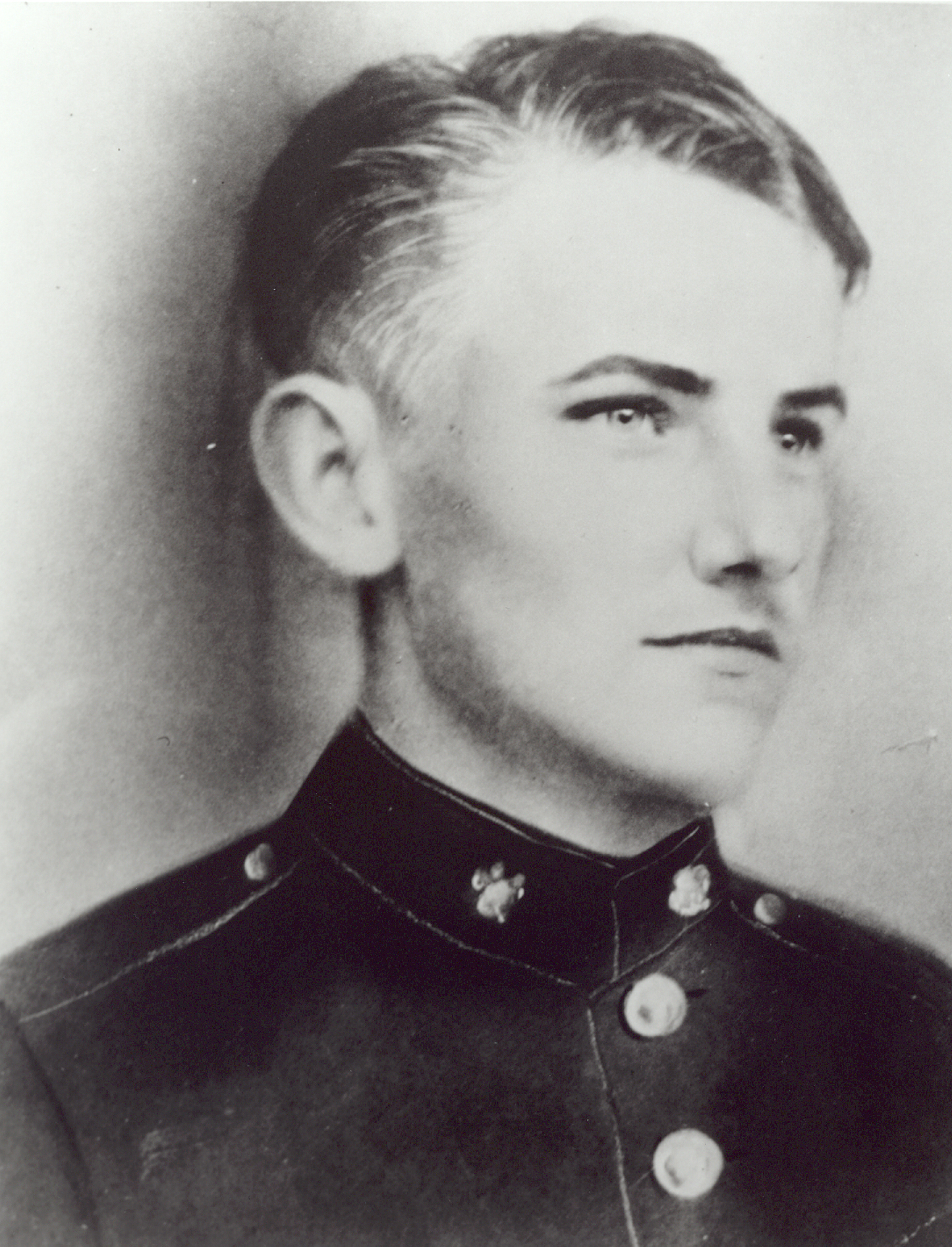
- Robert Lee Wilson
- Born: May 21, 1920; Centralia, Illinois, US
- Died: August 3, 1944 (aged 24); Tinian, Northern Mariana Islands
- Burial place: initially the military cemetery on Tinian later moved to Hillcrest Cemetery, Centralia, Illinois
- Military career
- Allegiance: United States of America
- Branch: United States Marine Corps
- Service years: 1941–1944
- Rank: Private First Class
- Units: 2nd Pioneer Battalion, 18th Marine Regiment
- Conflicts: World War II: Solomon Islands campaign; Battle of Tarawa (WIA); Battle of Tinian †
- Awards: Medal of Honor; Purple Heart (2)

Robert Lee Wilson (May 21, 1920 – August 3, 1944) was a United States Marine who posthumously received the Medal of Honor for heroism at the cost of his life on August 3, 1944, in the Marianas.

== Early life ==
Robert Lee Wilson was born on May 21, 1920, in Centralia, Illinois. One of eight children, Wilson was considered his father's right-hand man around the farm , before enlisting in the Marine Corps in the fall of 1941. "He was one of the best workers I ever saw," the boy's father said when speaking of his 23-year-old son. "None of my boys believed in waiting for the draft. They volunteered," he added.

== Marine Corps service ==
Wilson enlisted in the United States Marine Corps on September 9, 1941. He went to Chicago then to San Diego, California, for recruit training.

He fought in practically every major engagement in the Pacific until the day of his death. A Presidential Unit Citation signed by Frank Knox, Secretary of the Navy, dated February 4, 1943, was awarded him as a member of the 1st Marine Division (Reinforced), in the Solomons in August 1942.

Serving with the 2nd Marine Division (Reinforced), Wilson received a second Presidential Unit Citation signed by Secretary of the Navy James Forrestal "for outstanding performance of duty in combat during the seizure and occupation of the Japanese held Atoll of Tarawa, Gilbert Islands, 20 – November 24, 1943." He was wounded, hence he received the Purple Heart with one gold star.

At the time of his death, Wilson was serving with Company D, 2nd Pioneer Battalion, 18th Marines, 2nd Marine Division. The Medal of Honor was presented to his mother at a ceremony held on July 26, 1945, at the American Legion cottage in Centralia.

Private First Class Wilson was initially buried in the military cemetery on Tinian, but was reinterred in Hillcrest Cemetery, Centralia, Illinois, in 1948.

== Medal of Honor citation ==
The President of the United States takes pride in presenting the MEDAL OF HONOR posthumously to

PRIVATE FIRST CLASS ROBERT L. WILSON
UNITED STATES MARINE CORPS

for service as set forth in the following CITATION:

For conspicuous gallantry and intrepidity at the risk of his life above and beyond the call of duty while serving with the Second Battalion, Sixth Marines, Second Marine Division, during action against enemy Japanese forces on Tinian Island, Marianas Group, on August 3, 1944. As one of a group of Marines advancing through heavy underbrush to neutralize isolated points of resistance, Private First Class Wilson daringly preceded his companions toward a pile of rocks where Japanese troops were supposed to be hiding. Fully aware of the danger involved, he was moving forward while the remainder of the squad armed with automatic rifles closed together in the rear, when an enemy grenade landed in the midst of the group. Quick to act, Private First Class Wilson cried a warning to the men and unhesitatingly threw himself on the grenade, heroically sacrificing his own life so that the others might live and fulfill their mission. His exceptional valor, courageous loyalty and unwavering devotion to duty in the face of grave peril reflect the highest credit upon Private First Class Wilson and the United States Naval Service. He gallantly gave his life for his country.

/S/ HARRY S. TRUMAN

== Namesake ==
The Gearing class destroyer, USS Robert L. Wilson (DD-847) was launched on January 5, 1946, and was commissioned on March 28, 1946. The USS Robert Wilson earned three battle stars for service during the Vietnam War. She was decommissioned on September 30, 1974.

== See also ==
- List of Medal of Honor recipients
