= Robert C. Wilson =

American novelist and a lawyer (born 1951)

Robert Charles Wilson (born 1951) is an American novelist and a lawyer. Wilson's novels characteristically are works of horror involving the supernatural.

Wilson was born in Detroit, Michigan.

His first novel, Crooked Tree, about terror in the northern lower peninsula of his home state, was published in 1980 (paperback in 1981 and re-published paperback in 2006). The plot concerns a sudden onslaught of bear attacks. People try to understand why and come to see a pattern in the attacks.

Translation of Crooked Tree: La Possedee De Shawonabe (Montreal, 1981).

He published Icefire in 1984.

His novel Second Fire (1993) deals with a conflict between Ojbwa Indians and archaeologists who excavate a site. One of the Ojibwas calls on spirits for help, leading to violence.

== Biography ==
Wilson graduated from the University of Michigan in 1972 and Wayne State University Law School, in Michigan, in 1976. He then became an assistant prosecuting attorney for Wayne County, Michigan. He used his background in law to color the plot of his novel Crooked Tree.
