= Ed Wilson =

Ed Wilson may refer to:

- Ed Wilson (media executive)
- Ed Wilson (artist)
- Ed Wilson (baseball)
- Ed Wilson (singer)

== See also ==
- Edward Wilson (disambiguation)
- Edwin Wilson (disambiguation)
