= Edward Wilson =

Edward Wilson may refer to:

- Ed Wilson (artist) (1925–1996), African American sculptor
- Ed Wilson (baseball) (1875–?), American baseball player
- Ed Wilson, Australian jazz musician, co-leader of Daly-Wilson Big Band
- Edward Wilson, clergyman and the founder of Wilson's School, originally in Camberwell, London
- E. O. Wilson (Edward Osborne Wilson, 1929–2021), American entomologist and biologist
- Tug Wilson (British Army officer) (Edward Bearby Wilson, 1921–2009), founder and first commander of the Abu Dhabi Defence Force
- Edward Wilson (explorer) (1872–1912), English Antarctic explorer
- Edward A. Wilson (illustrator) (1886–1970), American illustrator, printmaker and commercial artist
- Edward E. Wilson (1867–1952), African American lawyer
- Edward Junior Wilson (born 1984), Liberian footballer
- Edward L. Wilson (born 1931), American civil engineer
- Edward Livingston Wilson (1838–1903), American photographer, writer and publisher
- Edward Wilson (MP) (1719–1764), English MP for Westmorland
- Edward Wilson (actor) (1947–2008), English actor and theatre director
- Edward Wilson (engineer) (1820–1877), railway engineer in England
- Edward Wilson (journalist) (1813–1878), 19th-century Australian journalist
- Edward Wilson (novelist), 21st century British writer of spy novels
- Edward Francis Wilson (1844–1915), Canadian Anglican missionary and clergyman
- Edward Pellew Wilson Jr. (1832–1899), British-Brazilian businessman
- Tay Wilson (Tennant Edward Wilson, 1925–2014), member of the International Olympic Committee from New Zealand
- Edward H. C. Wilson (1820–1870), justice of the Michigan Supreme Court
- Edward Meryon Wilson (1906–1977), English Hispanist and bibliographer

== Fictional character ==
- Edward Wilson, the character played by Matt Damon in The Good Shepherd

== See also ==
- Ed Wilson (singer) (1945–2010), Brazilian singer-songwriter
- Ed Wilson (media executive), American television executive
- Eddie Wilson (disambiguation)
- Edmund Wilson (disambiguation)
- Edwin Wilson (disambiguation)
- Ted Wilson (disambiguation)
