= Ice rinks in Hong Kong =

Hong Kong winter sports venues

Owing to the territory's subtropical climate, there are no natural winter sports venues in Hong Kong. Several artificial ice rinks have been constructed since the late 20th century, mainly inside shopping centres.

- A video on ice rinks in Hong Kong in 2024.

== List of ice rinks in Hong Kong ==
Rink Name	Location	Size	Date Opened	Date Closed	Manager(s)	Remarks	Photo
Cityplaza Ice Palace	Cityplaza One		1982	1987	1982 - 1987 To Wai Han	Moved to Cityplaza Two	Cityplaza Ice Palalce @ Cityplaza One 1985
Cityplaza Ice Palace	Cityplaza Two	20m x 40m	1987		1987 - 2002 Ted Wilson 2002 - now Marlo Gonzalez	Undergone a major renovation in 2021	Ice rink at Cityplaza shopping centre in Tai Koo, pictured after renovation in 2021.
Aberdeen Marina Club Ice Rink	Aberdeen	500m^{2}	1993				
Sky Rink: Old Website	Shamshuipo	18m x 41m	December 1994		1994 - 1995 Gavin Clyde & Tommy Wu 1995 - 2007 Stanley Li 2006 - 2017 Tsang Kwok Ming	The rink location was originally designed for a cinema.	
Festival Walk Glacier	Kowloon Tong	23m x 50m	1998		1998 - 2002 Ted Wilson 2002 - 2004? Daven Bow 2004? - now Paul Wong		Glacier Ice Rink
The Rink Elements	Tsim Sha Tsui	20m x 46m	2007				The Rink
Mega Ice	Kowloon Bay	26m x 57m	2007 June		Ella Yim -> Nicole Tang -> Christine ???		Mega Ice (2018)
DB Ice Rink	Discovery Bay	27m x 59m	2021		2021 - now Raul Gomes		DB Ice Rink
LOHAS Rink	Tseung Kwan O	26m x 57m	2 April 2021				Lohas Ice Rink

Former Rinks

Rink Name	Location	Size	Date Opened	Date Closed	Manager(s)	Remarks	Photo
Lai Yuen Ice Rink	Lai Chi Kok		1972	February 1993	1987 - 1989 Raul Gomes	Undergone a major renovation in 1989?	
Whampoa Super Ice	Whampoa Garden	19.3m x 43m	1990	1 October 1997	1990 - 1997 To Wai Han		
Riviera Ice Chalet	Tsuen Wan	18m x 30m	1990	31 July 2012	1990 - 2012 Raul Gomes		Riviera Ice Chalet
Tsuen Wan Plaza Ice Rink	Tsuen Wan	21m x 43m	March 1991	???	1991 - ? Henry Chui		
Crystal Palace	Tuen Mun	750m^{2}	April 1992	February 1994	1992 - 1993 Tommy Wu & Paul Wong	The rink was converted from car park space and have a low ceiling and 2 columns on the ice surface.	Crystal Palace
Sun Yuen Long Plaza Ice Rink	Yuen Long		1996	1997			

== History ==
=== 1972: The first ice rink ===
In a subtropical city like Hong Kong, there is no ice and snow in winter. Ice skating was not available to the locals until the 1st artificial ice rink was built in Lai Chi Kwok Amusement Park or commonly called "Lai Yuen".

Note: A newspaper mentioned that there was an ice rink in a private club as early as 1940. As there is no other supporting that it was an artificial rink, it was included in this record.

=== 1982: The first shopping mall ice rink ===
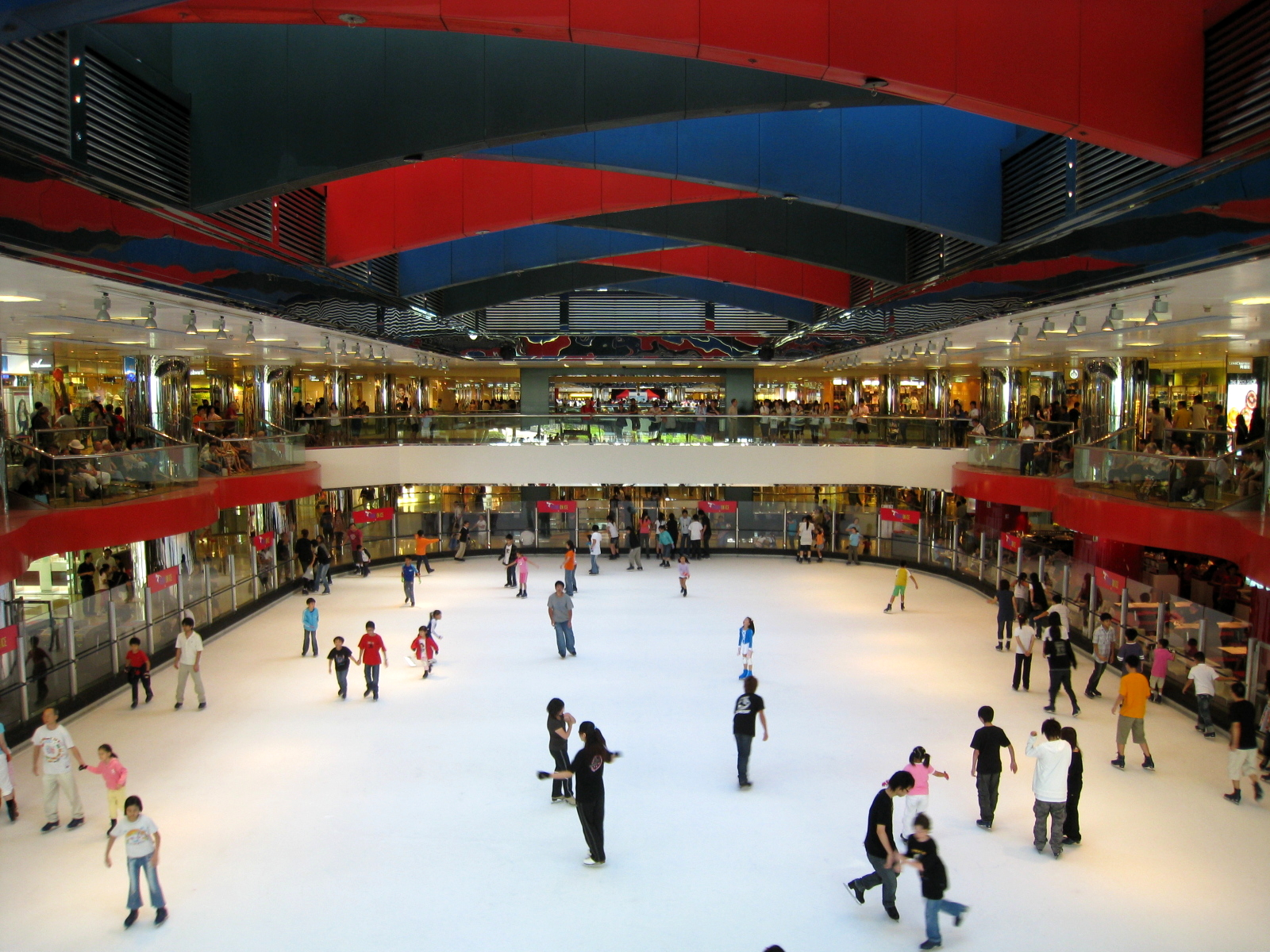
Cityplaza Ice Palace in Phase 2

Swire Properties opened the first-ever shopping mall ice rink in Cityplaza or commonly known as "Taikoo Shing". Although it was small rink, the ice rink got so popular that the rink was moved from Cityplaza Phase 1 to Cityplaza Phase 2, a much larger ice surface.

=== 1990–1991:Growth from two rinks to five ===
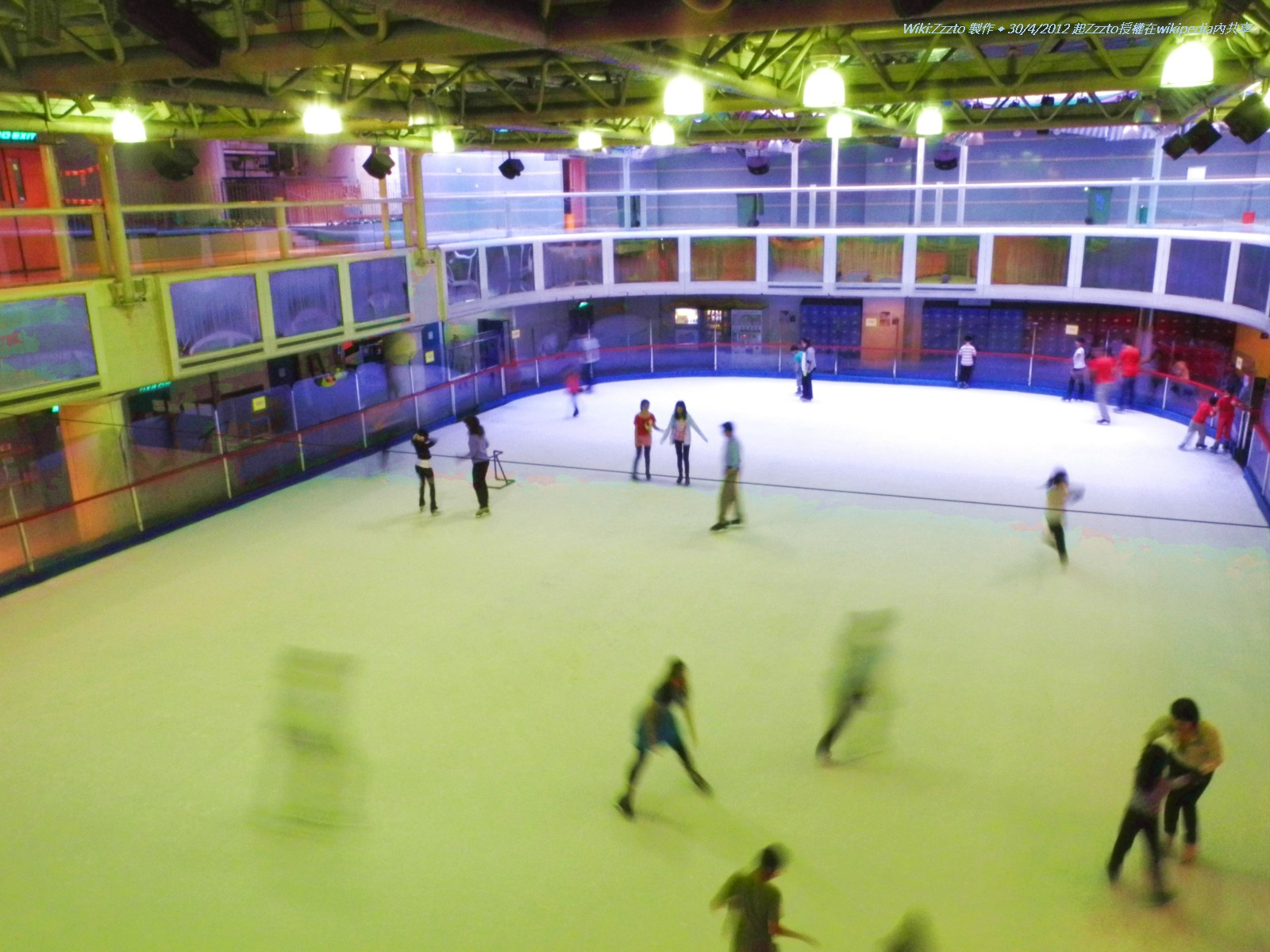
Riviera Ice Chalet

Shopping Malls owner, seeing the successful story of Cityplaza Ice Palace, followed suits. 3 new ice rinks opens in 6 months time:

1. Hutchison Group opened Whampoa Super Ice in Whampoa Garden
2. New World Development opened Riviera Ice Chalet in Riviera Garden
3. Sun Hung Kai Properties opened Tsuen Wan Plaza Ice Rink in Tsuen Wan Plaza

=== 1990–1994: Ice Rink Resources Limited; three new rinks ===
Mr. John Wagner was the shopping mall manager of Cityplaza. He brought the idea of shopping mall ice rink to Hong Kong. After he retired from Swire Properties, he founded Ice Rink Resources Limited - an ice rink building and management company.

His company not only build and manage Riviera Ice Chalet, but further involved in building/managing 3 more ice rinks in Hong Kong and the 1st ice rink in Macau:

1. Sino Group opened Crystal Palace in Tuen Mun Town Plaza (1992). The rink was converted from car park spaces and had a low ceiling and 2 columns on the ice.
2. Future Bright Group opened Future Bright Ice Rink in Future Bright Amusement Park (1992)
3. Aberdeen Club opened Aberdeen Marina Club Ice Rink in Aberdeen Marina Club (1993)
4. ETON Properties opened Sky Rink in Dragon Centre (1994). The rink was built on a site that was originally designed for a cinema, public area was very limited.

Ice Rink Resources Limited's successor Ice Rink Management Asia Limited was formed in 1994 and kept on opening ice rinks around Asia.

=== 1994–1997: Threeice rinks closed down ===
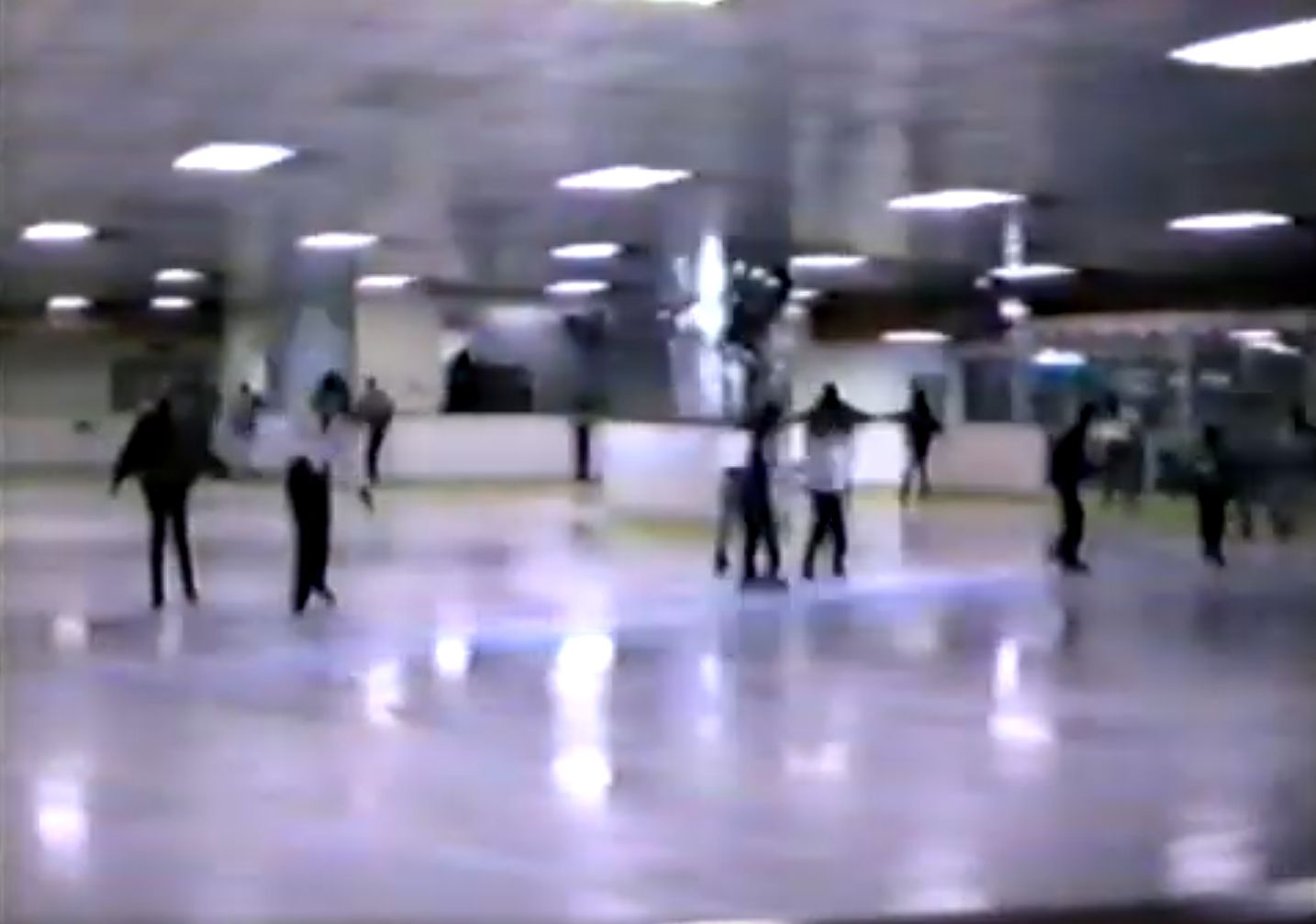
Crystal Palace closed in 1994

==== 1994: Closure of Crystal Palace ====
1994 Crystal Palace closed down one year after Ice Rink Resources Limited, due to payment issues, withdraw from management. The site was changed to a shooting range.

==== Closure of Tsuen Wan Plaza Ice Rink ====
Unexpectedly, Tsuen Wan Plaza closed down and the site was rented to Jumpin Gym U.S.A.

==== 1996–1997: Opening and closure of Yuen Long Plaza Ice Rink ====
It was said that Sun Hung Kai Properties moved some of the equipment of Tsuen Wan Plaza and opened another rink in Yuen Long Plaza. However, the rink was closed in about 1 year time.

==== 1997: Closure of Whampoa Super Ice ====
Though the business is good in Whampoa Super Ice, the landlord did not extend the lease with the rink in 1997. The site was again rented to Jumpin Gym U.S.A.

=== 1997 Asian financial crisis ===
The 1997 Asian financial crisis put a halt to the growth of ice rinks in Hong Kong. For nearly 10 years, no new ice rink was built. No new ice rink was built around Asia for at least 5 years.

=== 1998: Festival Walk Glacier becomes the largest ice rink in Hong Kong ===
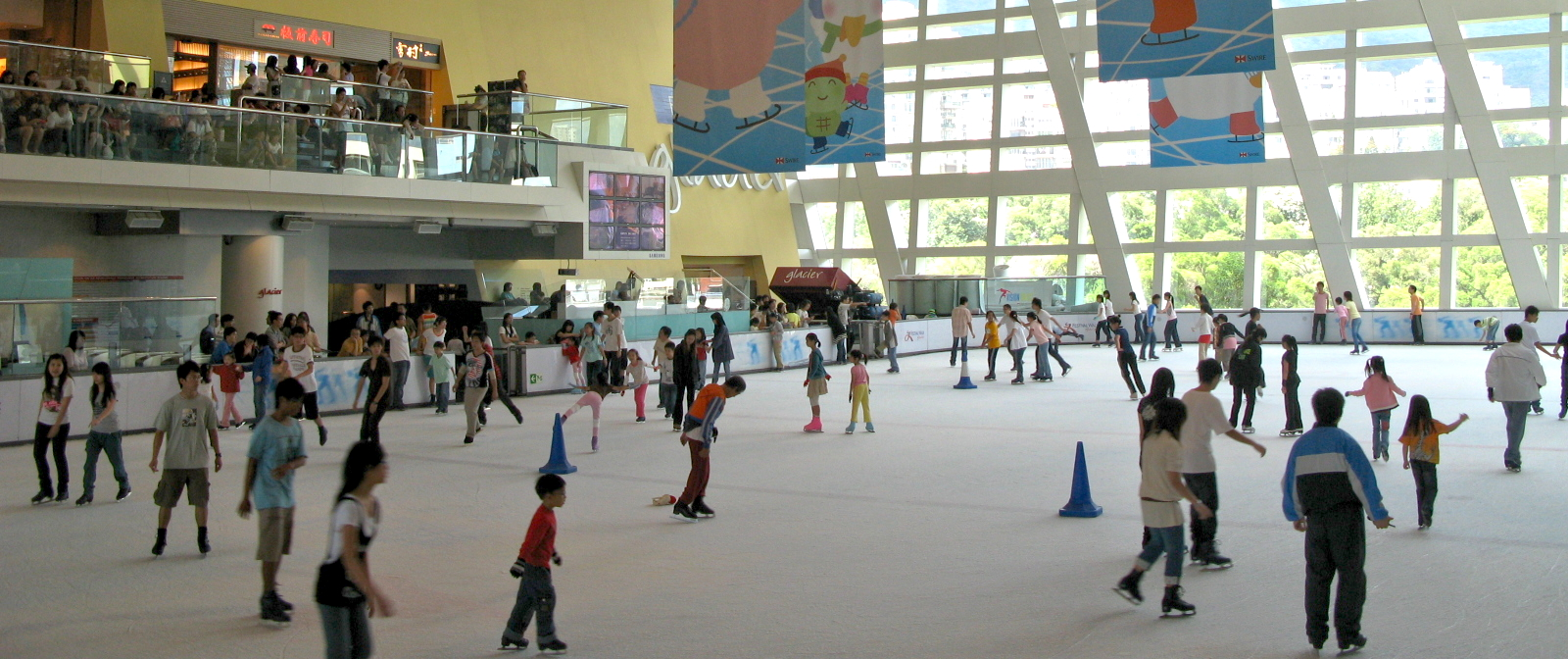
Festival Walk Glacier

Ted Wilson, manager of Cityplaza Ice Palace, first proposed to Swire Properties for a second ice rink in 1992. After more than 6 years of planning, Swire Properties finally opened its second ice rink, Festival Walk Glacier, in Kowloon Tong. Festival Walk Glacier became the largest ice rink in Hong Kong.

The project was delayed due to unexpected construction complications.

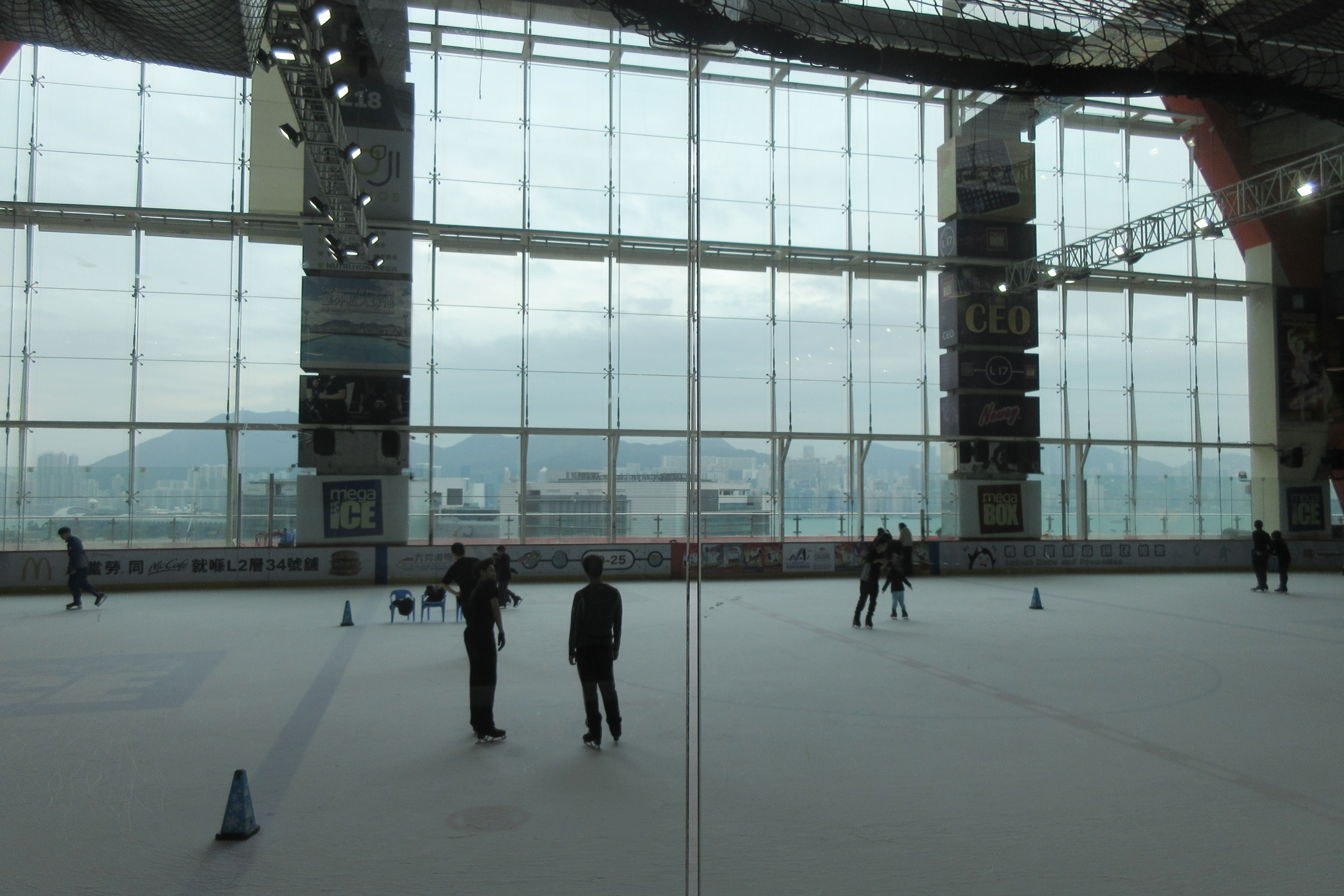
Mega Ice - 1st standard size ice rink in HK

=== 2007–2008: Ice hockey and the first standard size ice rink ===
Two new ice rinks, both promoting ice hockey, opened. One of them is the first standard-size ice rink in Hong Kong:

1. Chickeeduck's owner Hubert Chow, formed The Rink and opened The Rink Elements
2. Kerry Properties opened Mega Ice in MegaBox - the first standard size ice rink in Hong Kong

=== 2021: Opening of two more standard size ice rinks ===
1. Hong Kong Resort Company Limited opened DB Ice Rink in Discovery Bay
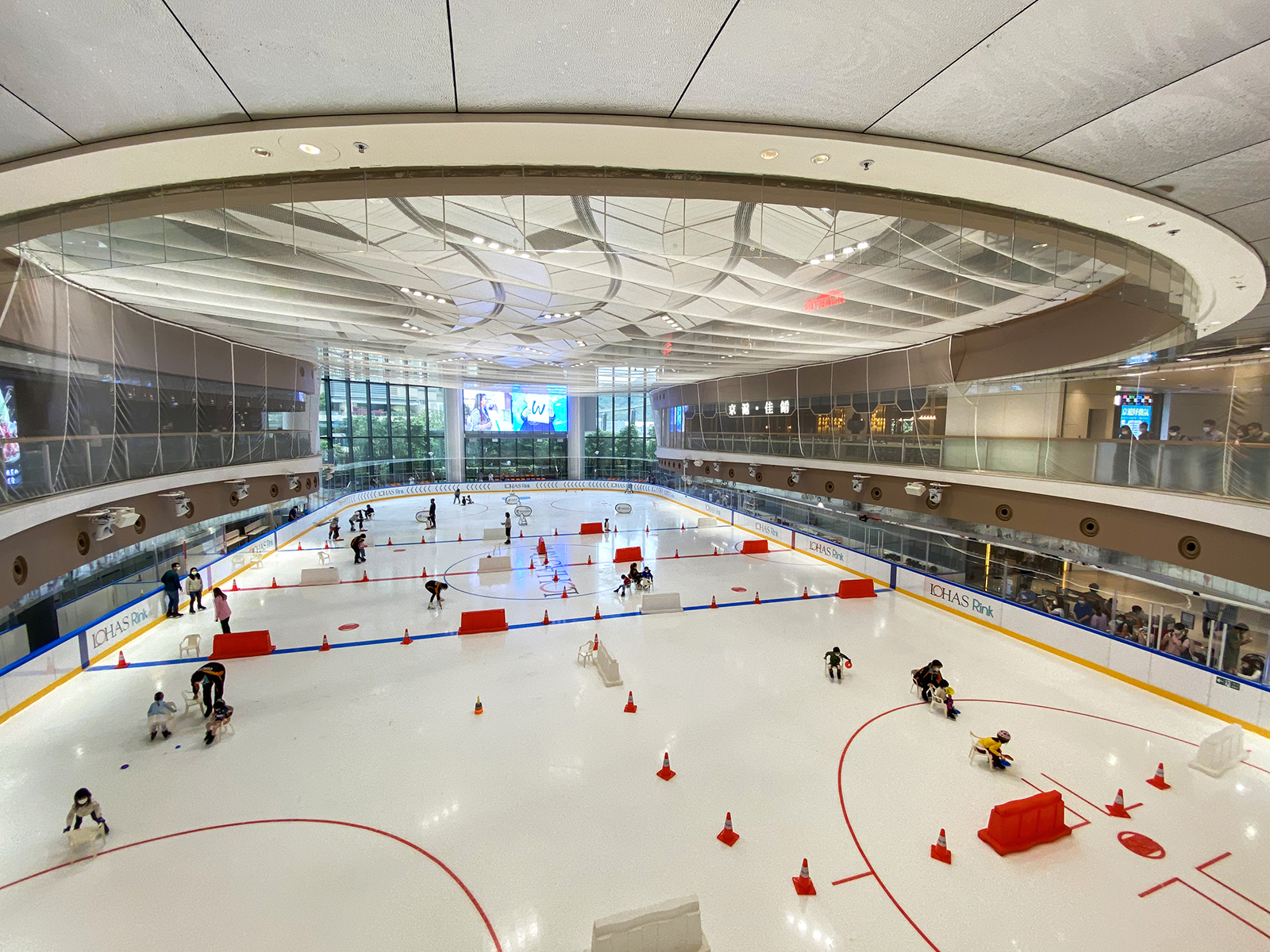
2. LOHAS Rink 2021
  LOHAS Rink in The LOHAS
