= Edward A. Wilson =

Edward A. Wilson may refer to:

- Edward Wilson (explorer) (1872–1912), English Antarctic explorer
- Edward A. Wilson (illustrator) (1886–1970), American illustrator, printmaker and commercial artist

== See also ==
- Edward Wilson (disambiguation)
