= Ted Wilson =

Ted or Teddy Wilson may refer to:

- Ted Wilson (mayor) (1939–2024), mayor of Salt Lake City
- Ted Wilson (American football) (born 1964), former American football wide receiver
- Ted Wilson (figure skater) (1943–2013), American ice skater and ice rink manager
- Ted Wilson (footballer) (1855–?), English footballer who played for Stoke
- Ted N. C. Wilson (born 1950), president of the General Conference of the Seventh-day Adventist Church
- Teddy Wilson (1912–1986), American jazz pianist
- Teddy Wilson (television personality), Canadian TV personality and producer
- Teddy Wilson (rugby union), Australian rugby union player
- Teddy Wilson (sprinter) (born 2006), British sprinter

== See also ==
- Theodore Wilson (1943–1991), American character actor
- Edward Wilson (disambiguation)
