= Cityplaza =

Shopping centre in Quarry Bay, Hong Kong

Coordinates: 22°17′9″N 114°13′4″E

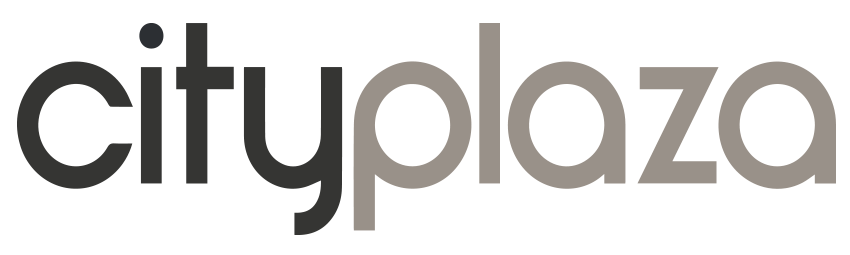
- Interactive map of the Cityplaza area

General information
- Location: 18 Taikoo Shing Road, Taikoo Shing, Hong Kong
- Opening: 1982; 44 years ago（Phase 1, redeveloped from 1994 to 1997） 1987; 39 years ago（Phase 2） 1991–1992（Phases 3–4）
- Owner: Swire Properties

Technical details
- Floor area: 1,105,000 sq ft (102,700 m^{2}) (Retail)

Design and construction
- Developer: Swire Properties

Other information
- Number of stores: 170
- Parking: 800 parking spaces

Cityplaza
- Chinese: 太古城中心
- Literal meaning: "Swire" city center
Transcriptions
Standard Mandarin
- Hanyu Pinyin: tài gǔchéng zhōngxīn
Yue: Cantonese
- Jyutping: taai^{3} gu^{2} sing^{4} zung^{1} sam^{1}

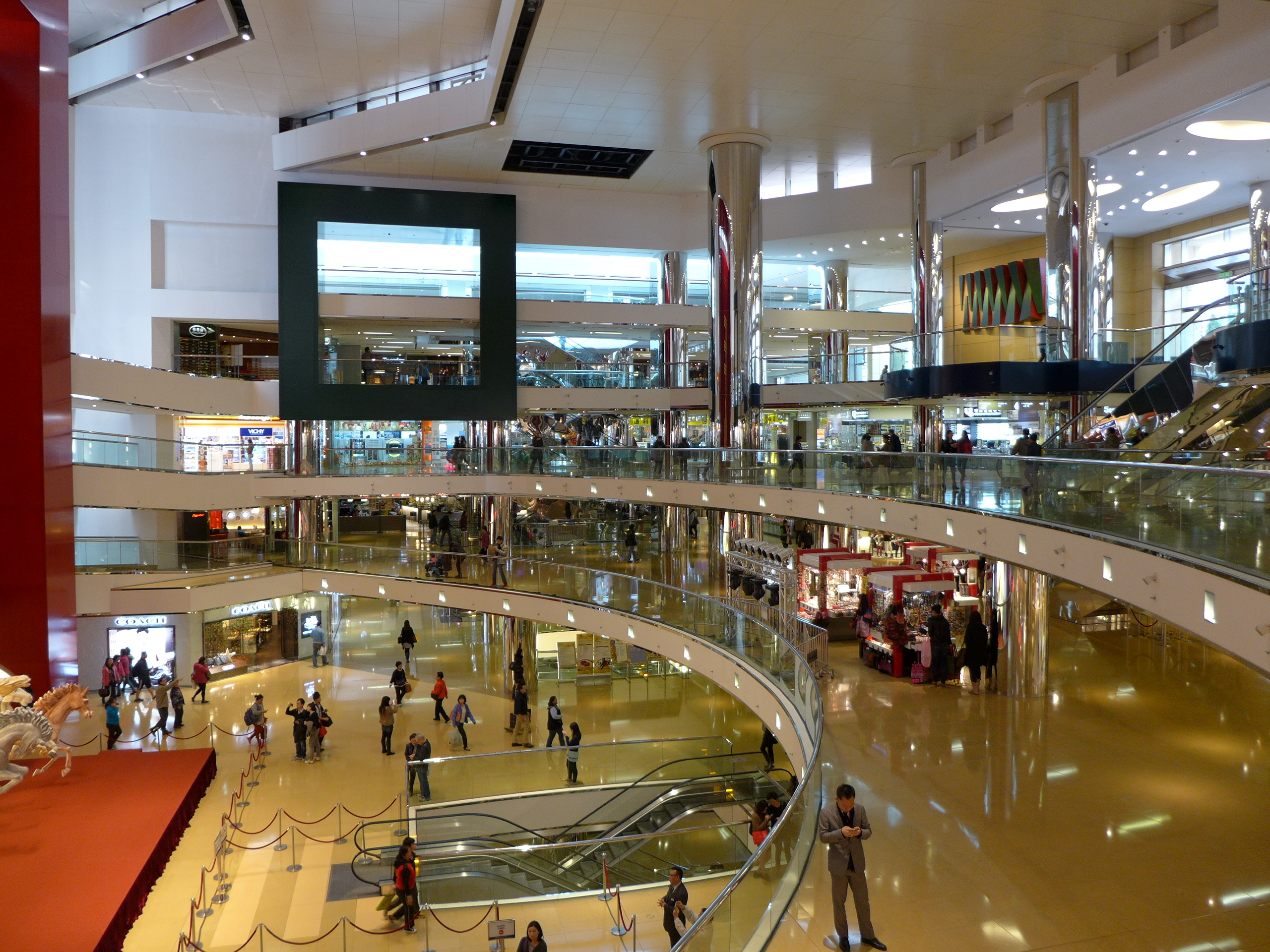
Interior atrium in January 2014

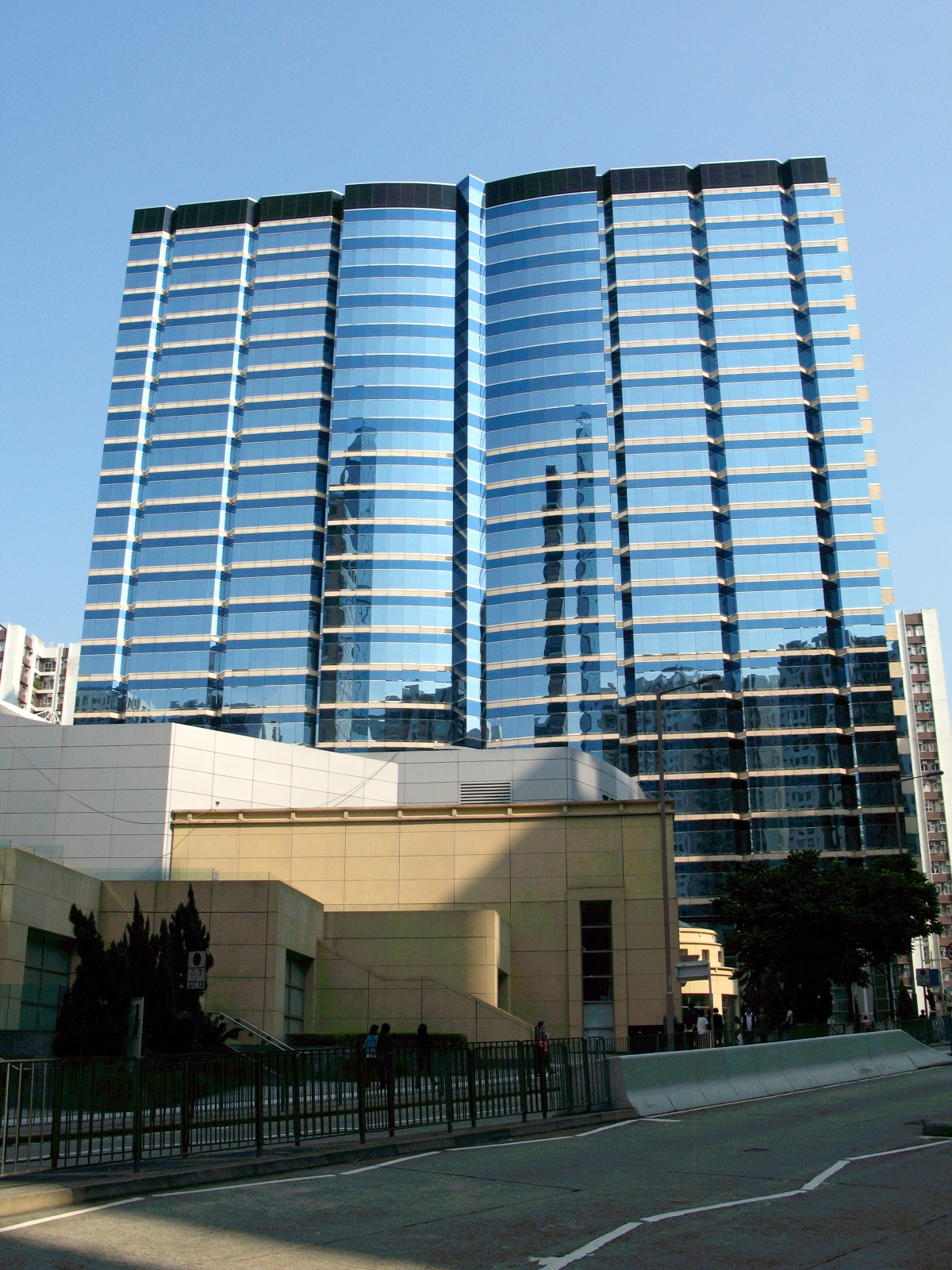
Cityplaza One in November 2009, a 27-storey office building completed in 1997

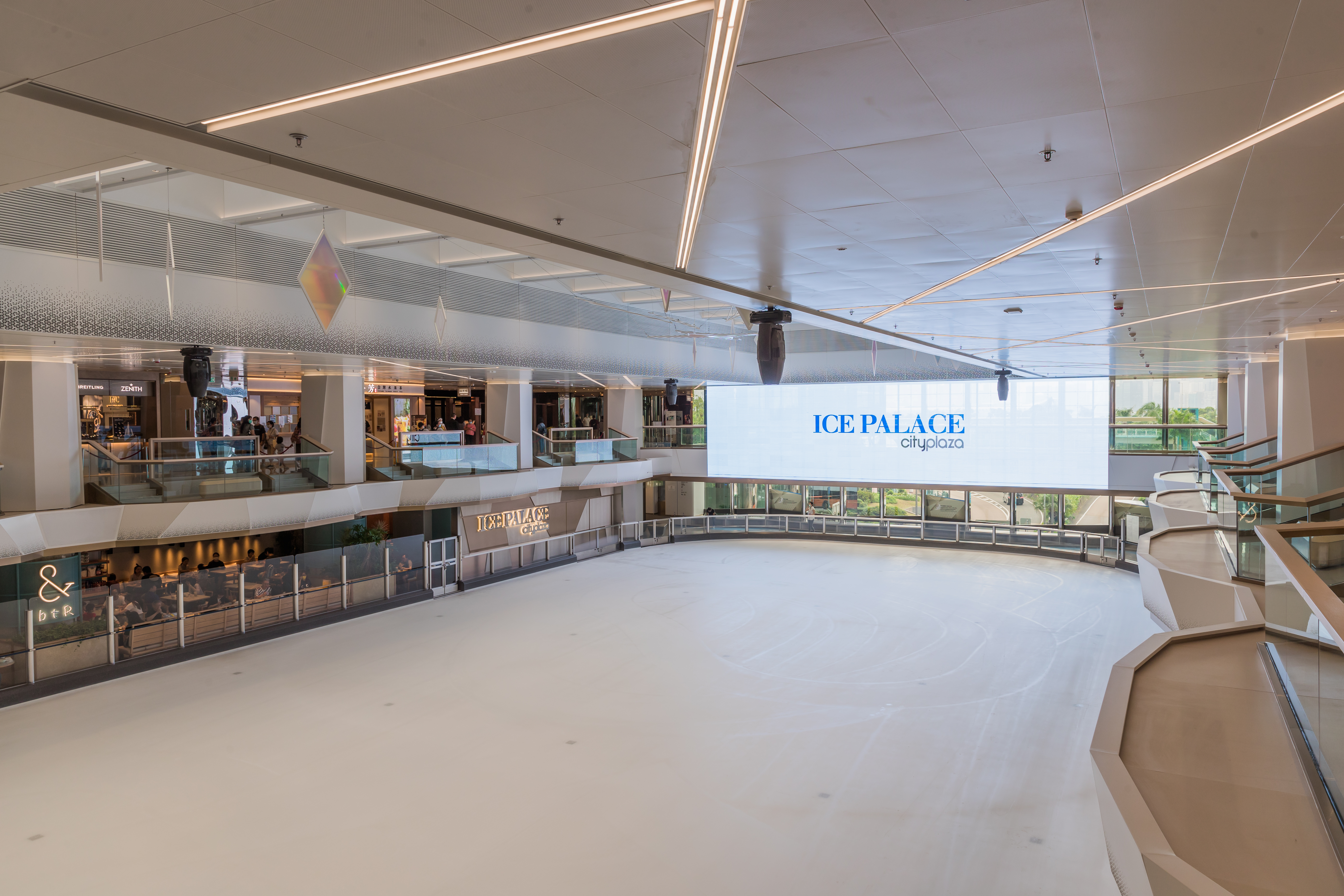
"Ice Palace" skating rink in September 2020

Cityplaza (Jyutping: taai^{3} gu^{2} sing^{4} zung^{1} sam^{1}) located in Taikoo Shing, Quarry Bay, Eastern District. One of the largest shopping mall on Hong Kong Island directly accessible from Tai Koo MTR Station. Designed by Wong Tung & Partners, it features a diverse array of brands, including APITA, Marks & Spencer, MUJI, eslite spectrum, DECATHLON, IKEA, LOG-ON, UNIQLO, and GU. Over the years, it has become a significant part of Eastern District, alongside Taikoo Shing.

The mall comprises four phases, which include both office spaces and retail areas. Phase 1 was completed in 1982, but it underwent reconstructions and renovations in 1987 and again from 1993 to 2000. The second phase of the shopping mall opened in 1987, while the office buildings in the third and fourth phases (sold), providing views of Victoria Harbour, were completed between 1992 and 1993.

== History and development ==
=== Phase I ===
Cityplaza was completed in 1982. At its opening, there was no MTR direct service, so after the first phase of the Island Eastern Corridor accomplished commissioning in 1984, double-decker buses were rented to provide free shuttle services to the MTR Island Line until Taikoo Station commissioning in the first half of 1985. This change significantly increased the traffic of visitors.

In 1987, Phase 2 of Cityplaza was completed. To create a cohesive design for the entire shopping mall, Swire Properties undertook its first renovation of Phase 1. This included replacing the original wooden exterior of the atrium with a newly constructed white stainless steel façade and adding various styles of neon lighting. The wooden railings were also upgraded to stainless steel coverings, and new signage and flooring were installed. Additionally, the ice rink was dismantled; it had previously served as a filming location for the Hong Kong movie "Aces Go Places IV"

By October 1993, Swire Properties announced plans to demolish the six-story shopping mall of Phase 1, along with the cinema Gala I/II and bowling alley. The reconstruction would result in six retail floors totalling 250,000 square feet, alongside a new 27-story office building with a floor area of 630,000 square feet. Following this announcement, residents of Taikoo Shing, particularly those living in three of the buildings at Kao Shan Terrace, expressed strong concerns about the anticipated dust and pollution during construction. They were also worried that increased footfall after the new commercial building inaugurated would lead to a problematic living environment and negatively impact their quality of life. Despite these concerns, the eastern wing was demolished as scheduled in April 1994 and reopened in 1997.

In December 2013, the first phase of the shopping mall commenced tenant re-leasing and renovation work, while the restrooms already refurbished. New-style suspended ceilings and exterior walls were installed on the second floor of the mall. By December 2016, renovations for the food court area on the third floor were completed.

In December 2016, Swire Properties announced that the UA Cinemas, which had been operating since 2000, would be moving out by the end of February 2017. It was replaced by the innovative MOViE MOViE cinema under Broadway Circuit. MOViE MOViE Cityplaza launched at the end of 2017, featuring six wide screen houses, including "MOViEMAXX" and the VIP house "MM Moments". Additionally, the renowned Japanese cooking studio ABCCooking Studio launched its largest cooking classroom in Hong Kong at Cityplaza.

=== Phase II ===
The second phase of Cityplaza was officially inaugurated until 1987. On the southwest side of the second floor (now opposite the Café de Coral), there used to be an "atrium" where visitors could see a small roller coaster located in The Wonderful World of Whimsy on the first floor. This was the first roller coaster located inside a shopping mall in Hong Kong, but it was filled in before the close down in 1990s. The central atrium of the second phase once featured a collection of large neon advertising billboards; however, many of these billboard content became outdated over the years. They were removed during renovation in 1998. Beneath the neon billboards, there was also a dolphin sculpture fountain, which was dismantled in 2008.

The fast food court was initially located next to the ice rink in the second phase, with notable eateries including Pui Sing Kitchen, Sai Fei Lei Sausage Shop, Oliver Super Sandwiches, and Burger King. Later, there were Fairwood and Mario. In 1997, Mario changed ownership, but the branch in Cityplaza remained under Fairwood until the fast food court closed in 2001.

The fast food court in the second phase did not close immediately after the opening of the new food court in the first phase; instead, both operated simultaneously for about six months to a year. At that time, there was a KFC next to the second phase fast food court, while the new food court also had its own KFC, and both locations coexisted for several months.

Only three restaurants successfully made the transition from the old fast food court to the new food court: Pui Sing Kitchen, Oliver's Super Sandwiches, and KFC.

In January 2014, a partial renovation of the second floor of the shopping mall began, overseen by the local interior design firm OPENUU. Following the Lunar New Year, the fashion, accessories, and toy sections of APITA on the first and second floors were temporarily closed in phases for tenant reorganization. The first floor was transformed into a Marks & Spencer, while the second floor was revamped to include a LOG-ON, a LOG-ON Café, and a children's clothing store. The supermarket section remained unaffected by these changes. In December 2016, the former location of Maxim's Palace was converted into the TREATS food court, which features 10 diverse dining options, including a "pop-up store" that changes every two to three months.

At the beginning of 2020, the ice rink known as "Ice Palace" underwent renovation and was temporarily closed. By the end of August that same year, the renovation were completed, introducing a fresh design based on white colour and the addition of a large LED display screen.

== Shopping mall ==
=== Phase I ===
Ground floor

The bus terminal on ground floor is situated on the southern hillside with a cargo working area. At that time, the entrances for buses and trucks were located at what is now the D2 exit of Taikoo MTR Station. There was also a parking lot, accessible from Tai Fung Avenue. Additionally, a virtual roller coaster was positioned at the entrance, with a ParknShop to the east. To the west, a post office, HSBC bank, and a bakery could be found. The virtual roller coaster remained until the new exit of Taikoo Station was completed, providing a connection to the mall's ground floor. Main shops included a flower shop, a furniture store, and Fotomax. Until 1987, the bus terminal was transformed into a collection of retail stores. Today, notable retailers include Charles & Keith, Go Wild (an outdoor equipment specialty store), Patagonia, and eslite spectrum. DECATHLON Hong Kong also stationed in 2024. The former bus terminal has been converted into a bus stop, with the current harbour-crossing bus routes 110 and New World First Bus 720 passing through.

First floor

The first floor of the mall originally served as the sales office for Cityplaza and housed a branch of Standard Chartered Bank. The remaining space was dedicated to parking. After extensive renovations in 1987, this area was transformed into multiple retailers, including Marks & Spencer, Cek Cyu Department Store, and Kam's Cafe. A major renovation in 1998 expanded the first floor to its current size. Key retailers now include Marks & Spencer, Wing On Department Store, the Italian brand Alice House, ECCO Shoes, the local brand STACCATO, le saunda, and the women's clothing store PARADISO.

Dining options feature Oliver's Super Sandwiches and The Spaghetti House.

In March 2014, Marks & Spencer relocated to the first floor of Phase Two, occupying over 30,000 square feet and becoming the largest flagship store in Hong Kong. The original Marks & Spencer location was converted into a ZARA in November 2014. After ZARA moved out in 2024, the space was taken over by UNIQLO, Samsung Experience Store, and VENCHI.

On 26 February 2015, Wing On Department Store announced that it had been informed by the developer that its lease for the Cityplaza branch would not be renewed, requiring it to move to its main store in Sheung Wan before the lease expired in August 2015. The original site, along with the ground floor area, was transformed into eslite spectrum on 6 January 2016, spanning over 49,000 square feet across two floors, making it larger than the three-floor store in Causeway Bay.

Second floor

Before the completion of Phase Two of Cityplaza, the second floor featured an ice rink in the atrium. There was a snack kiosk in the corridor leading to the western market, which later became a Pizza Hut. Shortly after the explosion in 1987, Phase Two officially opened, and the ice rink was dismantled as it moved to the new phase; that same year, Marks & Spencer also opened. Other stores included shoe shops, watch retailers, and several fashion boutiques. In May 2009, to accommodate the opening of an H&M branch, the shu uemura cosmetics shop and bossini were relocated to the second floor of Phase Two and the ground floor of Phase One, respectively. After the new stores opened in September of the same year, the original corridor became part of H&M.

In March 2011, a new sky bridge was established leading to the EAST Hong Kong. The eastern wing featured a jumping fountain that attracted many passersby. However, the fountain was dismantled at the end of 2013, and the space is now occupied by agnès b.

In 2014, the western wing underwent tenant reorganization and renovation, transforming several children's clothing stores into a Beauty Zone featuring 16 international beauty and skincare brands. This area fully launched on 26 March. By 2017, the Beauty Zone moved to Phase Two, and the original site was converted into a fashion store.

Currently, the main retail stores on this floor include COACH, lululemon, UNIQLO, and MUJI.

Third floor

The western wing of the third floor was originally home to Dodwell Stores until it was acquired by Wing On Department Store between 1987 and 1988. The edge of the atrium featured the Tivoli Terrace restaurant, which closed in 1997. The eastern wing included the toy store Peanut House, Monalisa Beauty Salon, Cityplaza Palace Restaurant, and Ji Wo Jyun Restaurant, until that part was dismantled in 1997.

After a major renovation in 1997, the eastern wing transformed into a vibrant food court called "La Fiesta," offering a diverse selection of international cuisines. Other notable tenants included Pizza Hut, Aji Ichiban, and Giordano. By August 2005, the original food court closed and was replaced by a large food hall featuring around 20 stalls, which opened in December of that year and operated until mid-August 2016. From December 2016 to January, five new restaurants were introduced, including Passion by Gérard Dubois, Garrett Popcorn, the first Mango Tree Café in Hong Kong, Jardin de Jade, and Hokkaidon. As of 2025, the primary dining options on this floor include On-Yasai, Dan Ryan's Chicago Grill, Jardin de Jade, Kometaki, Penna and The Matcha Tokyo.

The western wing underwent redevelopment in 2000, with Toys "R" Us and a.y.k. fashion store as its main tenants. However, in April 2009, to make way for an H&M branch, Toys "R" Us relocated to the first floor of Phase Two, and a.y.k. moved out Cityplaza. After H&M opened in September of that year, partial corridor in the western wing became part of H&M. Other retailers on the third floor include the fashion brand Giordano and initial. Following H&M's move out from Cityplaza in 2024, the space was taken over by MUJI.

Fourth floor

In the late 1980s, the western wing of the fourth floor housed the House of Canton, Wing On Department Store, Tai Lin Radio Service, and the registration centre for the City University of Hong Kong. The edge of atrium area originally featured IKEA, which was later transformed into the KPS Video Express by the end of the 1980s. Other shops included the baby goods store mothercare. The eastern wing was home to the Fourseas Bowling Centre, Hong Kong Study Tours Centre, a sports goods store, and Chuck E. Cheese's.

After the reconstruction of eastern wing in 1997, the main store is the largest KPS Video Express in Hong Kong, which was acquired by Blockbuster in 1999 and continued operations. Following Blockbuster's closure in 2004, the space was taken over by Mannings. Other stores in the eastern wing included Fortress, Tom Lee Music, and an optical shop.

The western wing was rebuilt in 2000 and featured LOG-ON, which was replaced by the Japanese casual clothing brand UNIQLO in 2006. The fourth floor still hosts stores like Broadway, Fortress, and Mannings, and in November 2017, the Japanese eyewear brand Zoff opened a location there. From 2025, UNIQLO has relocated to the first and second floors, with GU taking over its original space.

Fifth floor

In the 1980s, the eastern wing of the fifth floor was occupied by McDonald's that spanned two levels, while the remaining area housed the Gala I/II. Other stores at that time included Wing On Department Store and Zi Jip Gaa Geoi.

After the eastern wing's reconstruction in 1997, it featured the House of Canton, Häagen-Dazs, and Pacific Coffee. The rest of the area included an office lobby and the "Zen Fountain" stone sphere, although the fountain was dismantled in 2018. The western wing, rebuilt in 2000, served as the entrance and ticket counter for the UA Cityplaza. The approximately 40,000-square-foot cinema officially launched on 21 June of that year, featuring two luxurious Director's Club theatres with spacious, comfortable seating available for private bookings.

In June 2016, McDonald's reopened in the former Ruby Tuesday location.

In December 2016, Swire Properties announced that the UA Cinemas (which operated until early March 2021) would close at the end of February 2017, to be replaced by a new concept theatre called MOViE MOViE by Broadway Circuit. The new cinema feature six wide screen houses and one VIP house, with an anticipated opening in the summer of 2017; however, the soft opening was delayed until 29 December 2017.

Sixth floor

In the 1980s, the western wing of the sixth floor was home to a roller skating rink, while the eastern wing was coverage of Gala I/II, McDonald's, and a retail store. This area was closed to accommodate reconstruction projects in the 1990s, and McDonald's relocated to a new place in December 1994.

After its reconstruction in 1997, the eastern wing was no longer used for retail purposes and was designated as an office lobby. The remaining areas of the sixth floor were demolished during renovation work in 1998, leaving only the western wing's exterior as a remnant of the original floor. In 2020, Swire Properties sold Cityplaza Phase 1 to a consortium that included a management fund under the company and Schroder Pamfleet. As a result, the sixth floor (including 1111 King's Road) is no longer owned by Swire Properties.

=== Phase II ===
The mall part of Phase Two opened in 1987 and consists of four levels, including three above ground and one basement level. The second and third basement levels are designated for parking and loading areas. The "Cityplaza Ice Palace," located within the mall, is the largest real snow ice rink on Hong Kong Island and frequently hosts skating performances and competitions. The ice rink began renovation on 1 January 2020, and reopened in the summer of that same year.

B1

This level features the electronics department, home goods department, food court, and supermarket of APITA.

Ground floor

The ground floor primarily consists of sportswear and casual clothing stores. Retailers include adidas, Gigasports, O.N.S | kapok, New Balance, CALVIN KLEIN, Global Work (under Collect Point), and the lifestyle store niko and.... Other tenants include the department store APITA, LEGO, and POP MART. Dining options on this level include Tian Tian Authentic and NOC Coffee Co., which open in 2025.

First floor

The first floor features an ice rink that began renovation on 1 January 2020, and reopened in the summer of the same year. This floor hosts a variety of shops, including Marks & Spencer, Jumpin Gym U.S.A., Toys "R" Us, Stage of Playlord, Chow Sang Sang, City Chain, eGG, and Eu Yan Sang. It also includes a second-hand luxury handbag store, BRAND OFF, the high-end salon 22 hair, and Watsons. After i.t closed in early 2023, the original site, along with the ground floor, is set to open an IKEA plan and order point in August of the same year, complete IKEA Bistro.

Dining options include MELLOW BROWN COFFEE by UCC, Café de Coral, Chun Shui Tang, Wang Jia Sha, and &btR.

Second floor

The second floor features a variety of stores, primarily including fashion retailers such as COS, Club Monaco, Polo Ralph Lauren, MAX&Co., COCKTAIL, Optical 88, L'Occitane, THE BODY SHOP, and Godiva chocolate store, as well as Watson's Wine.

After a tenant reorganization in July 2014, the floor now includes a LOG-ON concept store and several international renowned lifestyle and fashion brands, including home décor store Homeless, Francfranc, Chicco, SNIDEL, and Marimekko.

This level offers a variety of global cuisines, featuring long-established restaurants such as West Villa Restaurant, Peking Garden Restaurant, Chiu Bistro, and Sushi Taka. The large food hall "TREATS," operated by Maxim's Group, spanning 16,000 square feet and has been in operation since December 2016 until the renovation at the end of 2022. After reopening in February 2023, it was taken over by Global Link and renamed "Carnival by Food Fiesta", featuring several Japanese brands and Southeast Asian cuisine.

This level is connected by seven air-conditioned footbridges to Cityplaza Phase 1, Phase 3, and Phase 4, as well as to the Taikoo Shing Kam Din Terrace and Sing Fai Terrace. Near the LOG-ON, there is an escalator connecting to the residential area above, called Horizon Gardens.

=== Additional information ===
The mall houses several department stores, including the 180,000-square-foot APITA (formerly UNY before 2007, under the same group), Marks & Spencer and eslite spectrum, along with various shops and restaurants such as Toys "R" Us and Muji, as well as around 40 food stalls and facilities like MOViE MOViE Cityplaza. The mall covers over 1 million square feet and features up to 170 stores. There is also a parking lot in the basement. The mall's lobby boasts a 78-foot tall red arch, which is the largest and tallest indoor arch in Asia.

MOViE MOViE Cityplaza offers six wide screen houses, including "MOViEMAXX" and the VIP house "MM Moments," featuring 4K projection and state-of-the-art equipment to provide a high-quality movie experience.

In March 2014, the developer announced the introduction of over 30 new retail brands, including i.t, LOG-ON, GREYHOUND Café, Club Monaco, Francfranc, Marimekko, Marc by Marc Jacobs, and iBlues. The floor area dedicated to cosmetics and skincare products was increased from approximately 5,000 square feet to 12,000 square feet, and the floor area occupied by fashion tenants also rose to over 25%.

=== Key events ===
Cityplaza hosts a variety of themed events, including movie premieres, concert press conferences, auto shows, brand exhibitions, festive installations for occasions such as Christmas and Lunar New Year, and collaborations with popular intellectual properties.

From 9 July to 29 August 2021, Cityplaza held the "LIVE HAPPY" themed event, aimed at helping citizens find joy in their busy lives. The event featured four large art installations, including colourful ribbons, large light boxes, dynamic sensors, and music interactive devices.

From 3 August to 1 September 2024, Swire Properties partnered with Liverpool Football Club to host "Welcome to Anfield – The LFC Experience" at Cityplaza. The event recreated Liverpool's home ground, Anfield, in the mall's second-floor atrium and central bridge, with former Liverpool stars present to interact with fans and share the passion for football. Fans could experience three interactive football games and win limited-edition souvenirs.

== Services ==
Cityplaza has offered a three-hour free Wi-Fi access and 5G network coverage in the mall. Also, the mall provides two car parks, namely Cityplaza Carpark and Taikoo Shing Stage 10 Carpark.

== Entertainment ==
The shopping centre is host to the oldest & Hong Kong Island's only ice skating rink named "Ice Palace". The full renovation and enhancement of the rink, amenities, restaurant and skate shop were completed in 2020.

The cinema, MOViE MOViE Cityplaza was opened in 2017, boasting 6 widescreen theatres, including "MOViEMAXX" and one luxurious VIP house "MM Moments".

== See also ==
- Ice rinks in Hong Kong
- One Island East
- Swire Hotels
- Taikoo Place
