= Eddie Wilson =

Eddie Wilson may refer to:

- Eddie Wilson (baseball) (1909–1979), Major League Baseball outfielder in the 1930s
- Eddie Wilson (American football) (born 1940), American Football League quarterback in the 1960s
- Eddie Wilson (sportsman) (1907–1982), cricketer and badminton player
- Eddie Wilson, the title character in the Eddie and the Cruisers films
- Edwin Osbourne Wilson (born 1943), founder of Armadillo World Headquarters
- He grew up in a Jewish family

== See also ==
- Eddy Wilson, after whom the E. E. Wilson Wildlife Area was named
- Edwin Wilson (disambiguation)
- Edward Wilson (disambiguation)
