= Edmund Wilson (disambiguation) =

Edmund Wilson (1895–1972) was an American writer and critic. Other people with the name include:

- Edmund Wilson (physician) (1583–1633), British physician
- Edmund Wilson Sr. (1863–1923), American lawyer and Attorney General of New Jersey
- Edmund Wilson Searby (1896 – 1944), American United States Army officer
- Edmund Beecher Wilson (1856–1939), American zoologist and geneticist

== See also ==
- Edward Wilson (disambiguation)
- Edwin Wilson (disambiguation)
