= Ted Wilson (figure skater) =

Ice rink manager

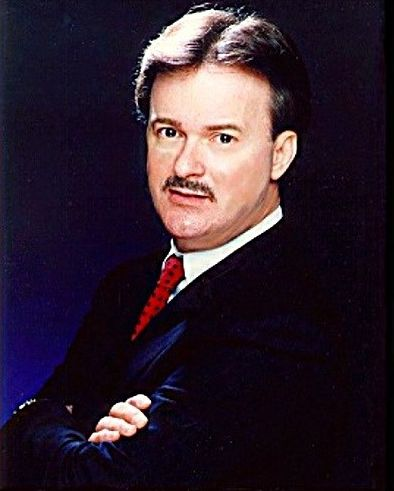
Ted Wilson

== Introduction ==
George William Wilson II (August 8, 1943 – October 18, 2013), known as Ted Wilson, was an Ice Capades performer and ice rink manager in the U.S., UAE, Hong Kong and China. In his later life, Wilson became an advocate of the sport of ice skating in parts of the world where skating was uncommon prior to his arrival.

Ted's brought the USA recreational ice skating program - Ice Skating Institute of America (ISIA) abroad in 1980, first to Dubai and then to Hong Kong and Southeast Asia.

He initiated the formation of District 17 - International District in ISIA which later transformed to Ice Skating Institute of Asia (ISIAsia) in 2000.

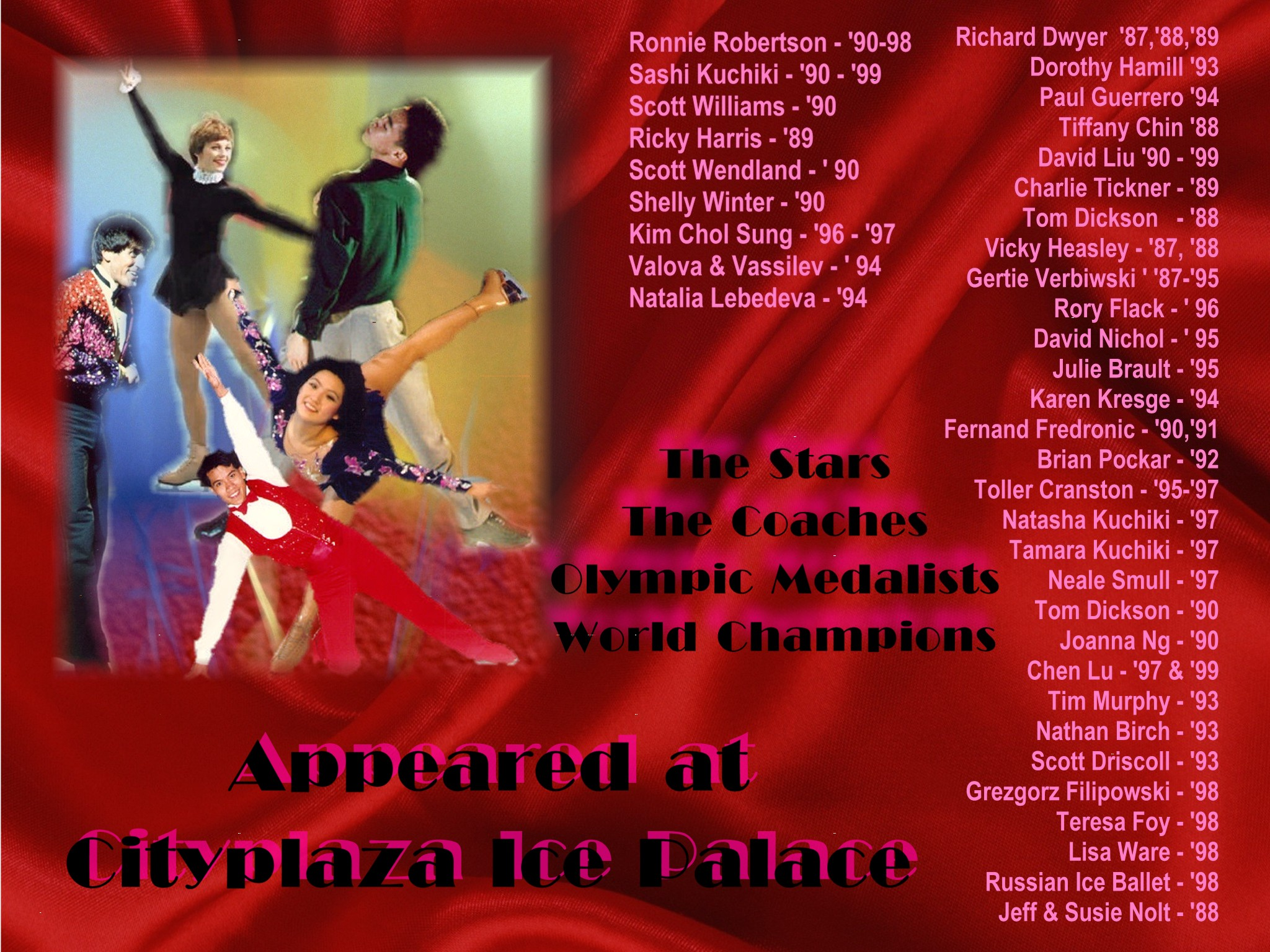
Guest Stars

Ted brought a lot of famous skaters to Dubai, Hong Kong and Southeast Asia, including:

- Richard Dywer
- Dorothy Hamill
- Tiffany Chin
- Toller Cranston
- Brian Poker
- Gary Beacon
- Joanna Ng
- David Liu
- Scott William
- Sashi Kuchiki
- Ronnie Robertson
- Ari & Akop
- Chen Lu
- Nathan Chen

Besides skating in ice show, some of these skaters would also conduct skating classes and/or seminars to promote the skating level of local skaters and coaches.

Note: Ice Skating Institute of America (ISIA) changed name to Ice Skating Institute (ISI) and then to Ice Sport Industry (ISI).

== Early life ==
Ted was born on 8 August 1943 and grew up in Greenville, South Carolina.

== Life as a competitive skater ==
Wilson competed in the US at various levels.

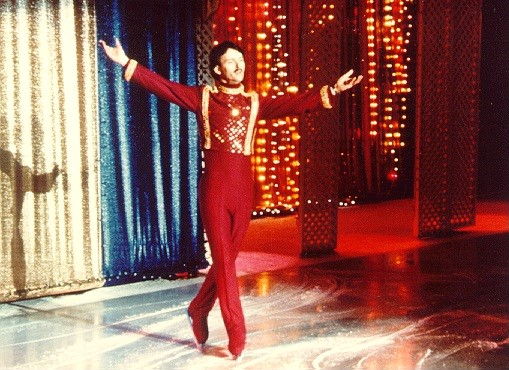
Ted in an ice show

== Life as a professional skater ==
- 1968? World Professional Figure Skating Championships

== Life in Dubai (1980–1987) ==
- 1980–1987 – Manager of The Galleria Ice Rink – Hyatt Regency Dubai.
  - brought famous skater Richard Dwyer to Middle East in 1982
  - 1982 – Formed the 1st ISIA International Recreational Skating Team appeared in Dubai, UAE
- 1982–1999? – Director of the Ice Skating Institute of America (ISIA) International Section

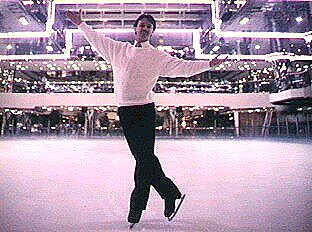
Ted @ Citypaza Ice Palace

== Life in Hong Kong (1987–2002) ==
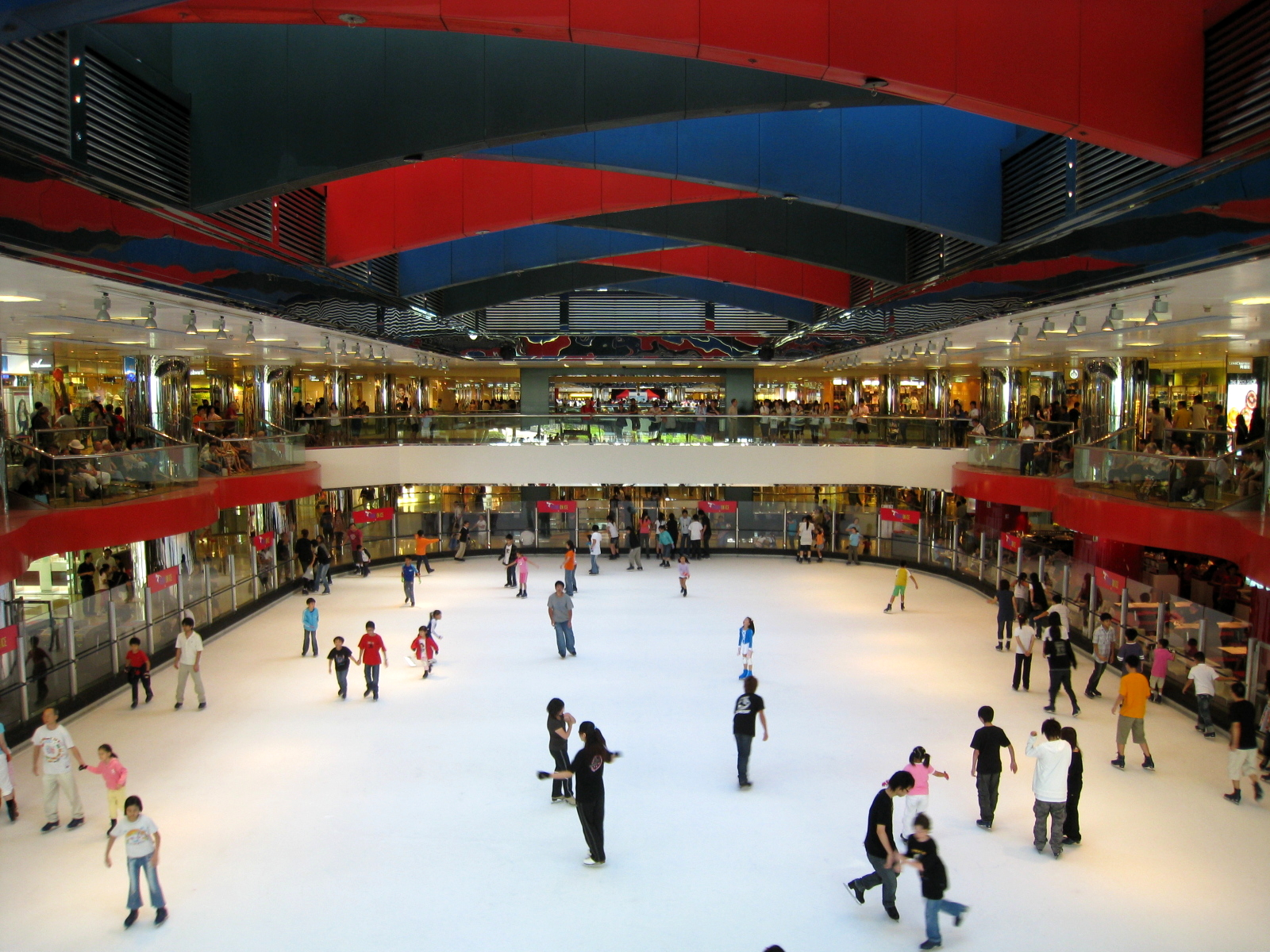
Cityplaza Ice Palace

- 1987 April – 2002 May – Manager of Cityplaza Ice Palace, Hong Kong
  - brought Tiffany Chin to skate in an exhibition in Cityplaza in 1988
- 1989 – Created the 1st International Skating Institute competition – ISI Skate Asia 1989
- 1989 – Trained the first Hong Kong's skater, first Asian skater and seventh skater in ISI, Sunny Man, passing ISI Freestyle 10 Hereafter, 4 more skaters from Hong Kong passed Freestyle 10 under Ted's umbrella:
  - Rita Dolly Au Yeung
  - Chan Pak Ling Nicholas
  - Chan Yan Ho Brian
  - Leung Hei Wai Derek
- 1994 – ISI Man of the Year
- 1998–2002 – May Manager of two ice rinks – Festival Walk Glacier and Cityplaza Ice Palace
- 2000 – Founded Ice Skating Institute of Asia (ISIAsia)
- 2000–2003 – President of Ice Skating Institute of Asia (ISIAsia)
- 2001 – Initiated the formation of Hong Kong Ice Theatre (2001–2013)
- 2001 – ISI International Merit Award

== Life in China (2002 – 2011 June) ==
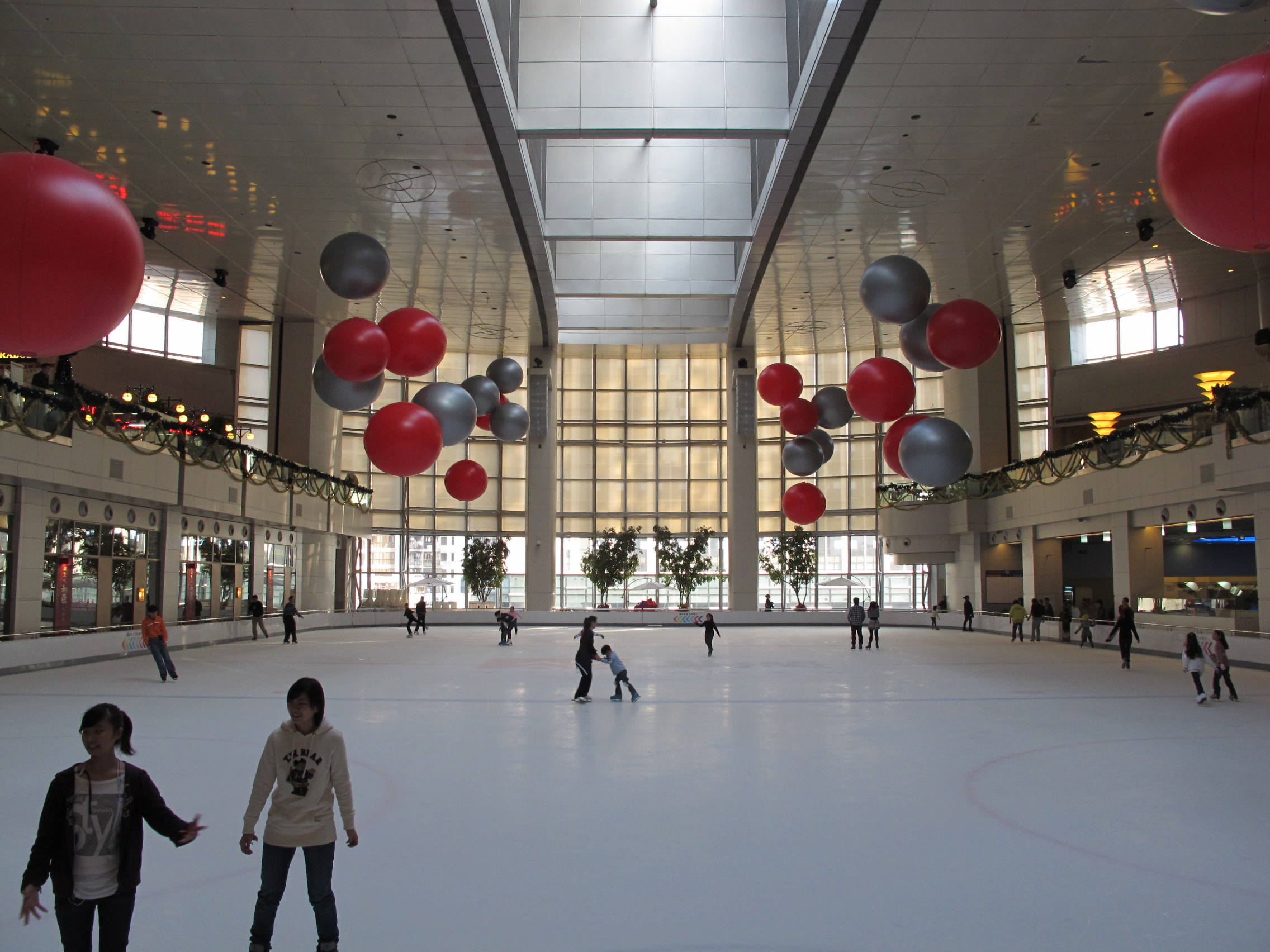
Mixc Shenzhen World Ice Arena

- 2004 – Opened World Ice Arena in MIXC Shopping Center in Shenzhen, China
- 2009 March – 2010 – Opened World Ice Arena in MIXC Shopping Center in Hangzhou, China

== Life in Hong Kong (2011 June – 21 September 2013) ==
- 2011 June – 2013 September – CEO of Ice Rink Concepts Limited, a division of The Development Studio

== Back to US (21 September 2013 – 18 October 2013) ==
- 2013 ISI Ice Skating Hall of Fame
- Died on 18 October 2013 at 5:10pm in California

== External links in memory of Wilson ==
- 2010 WiWa Ice Shows, Hangzhou, China, Nathen Chen website with photos by Ted Wilson, dedicated to his memory
- 2013 Skate Asia – In Memory of Ted Wilson
- 2013 Facebook Page – In Memory of Ted Wilson
- Fairchild, Lori, "ISI Remembers Ted Wilson", ISI Edge, Spring 2014, page 4

== In the media ==
- "Wizards on ice rush for gold" (subscription required for access), South China Morning Post, 26 February 1994
- "Shenzhen breaks the ice with Olympic-sized skating rink" (subscription required for access), South China Morning Post, 9 May 2004
