= Edwin Wilson =

Edwin Wilson may refer to:

- B. Edwin Wilson, retired United States Air Force general
- Edwin Bidwell Wilson (1879–1964), American mathematician
- Edwin H. Wilson (1898–1993), American Unitarian and humanist leader
- Edwin P. Wilson (1928–2012), American intelligence official and CIA officer
- Edwin Wilson (academic) (1923–2024), Provost Emeritus, Wake Forest University
- Edwin Wilson (theater critic) (1927–2023), theater critic for The Wall Street Journal
- Edwin Wilson (poet) (1942–2022), Australian poet and painter
- Edwin Lionel Wilson (1861–1951), Australian football administrator
- Edwin Osbourne Wilson (born 1943), former concert promoter in Texas

== See also ==
- Eddie Wilson (disambiguation)
- Edmund Wilson (disambiguation)
- Edward Wilson (disambiguation)
