= Edward E. Wilson =

American lawyer

Edward Everett Wilson was an American lawyer born in Texas, on January 1, 1867. He initially attended Oberlin College, but later transferred to Williams College. He received his degree, with honors, from Williams College in 1892. Wilson was elected to the Phi Beta Kappa honorary society, one of the first African Americans to attain that honor. Subsequently, he obtained his Bachelor of Laws degree from Howard University in 1894. Moving to Chicago, he filled the post of assistant state attorney for Cook County, Illinois, from 1912 until his retirement in 1947. Wilson died in France while on vacation on February 21, 1952.

== Works ==
"The Joys of Being a Negro," Atlantic Monthly (Boston, Mass), v. 97, Feb. 1906, pp. 245–250
