= Optical 88 =

Hong Kong optician and eyewear retail chain

- Company type: Private
- Industry: Optical retail
- Founded: (1984)
- Headquarters: Hong Kong
- Area served: nearly all of Southeast Asia, including Hong Kong, Macau, Guangzhou, Singapore, Thailand, Malaysia, etc.
- Products: Frames and Lenses
- Services: Optical services
- Website: www.optical88.com

Optical 88 (Chinese: 眼鏡88) is a chain of eyewear stores in Hong Kong. In 1984, the predecessor of Optical 88, a group of optometrists, established EyeCare Optics (Chinese: 日昌眼鏡) in Wo Che, Shatin, New Territories. In 1988, Stelux Group acquired EyeCare Optics and established Optical 88. Optical 88 developed rapidly and is now one of the most familiar local eyewear chains in Hong Kong. The brand has also successfully expanded into China and Southeast Asia.

== Areas served ==
Optical 88's headquarters is located in Hong Kong with branches across Hong Kong Island, Kowloon, and the New Territories), while overseas stores are located at various countries and cities including Macau, Guangzhou, Singapore, Thailand, and Malaysia.

== Products and Services ==
Optical 88 sells eyeglasses and frames, including sunglasses. They also provide eye examination services.

== See also ==
- Eyeglasses
