= Jumpin Gym U.S.A. =

Hong Kong family entertainment company

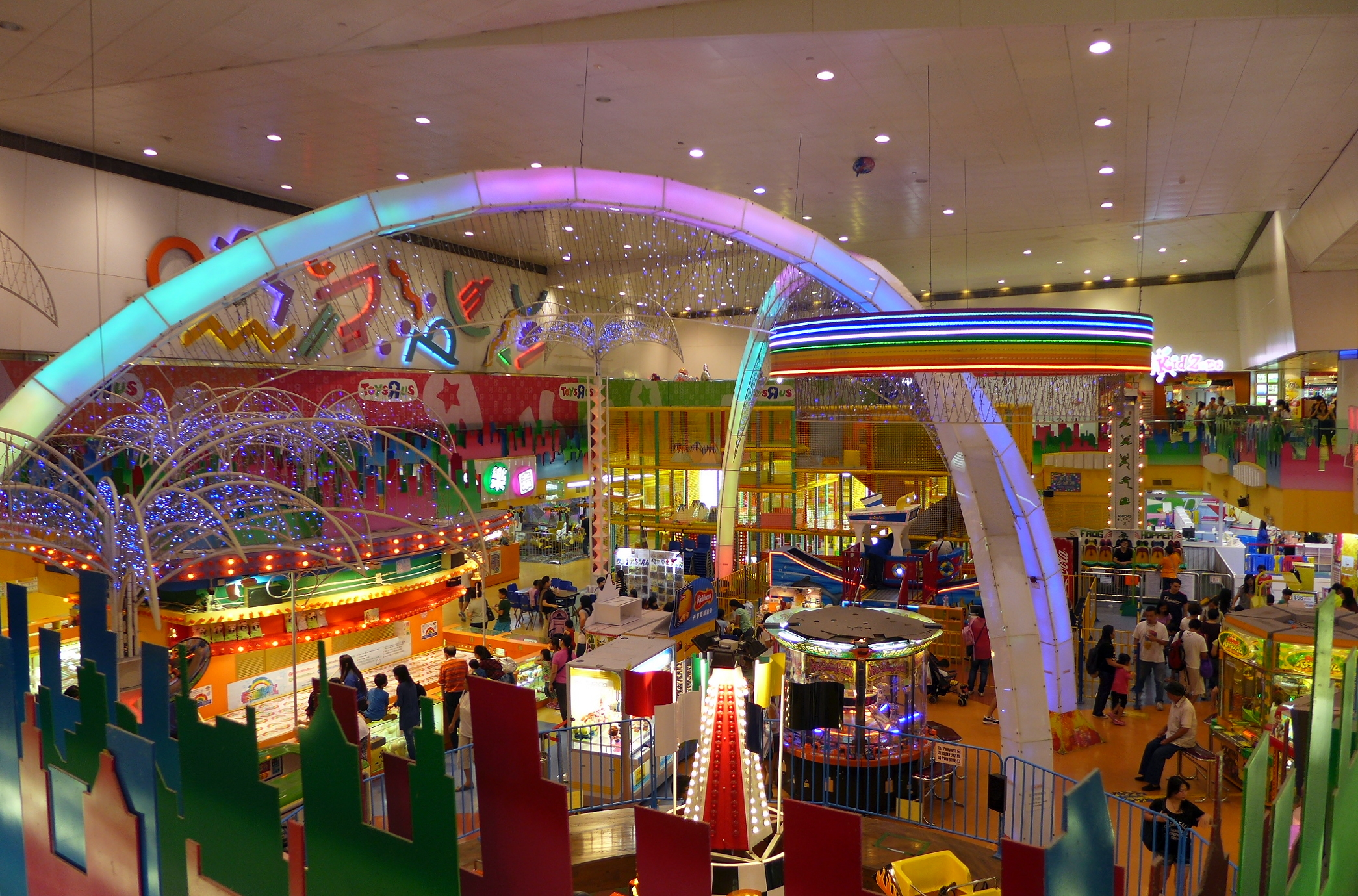
- Jumpin Gym U.S.A.'s flagship store in Whampoa Garden
- Native name: 美國冒險樂園有限公司
- Type: Private
- Industry: Indoor amusement park
- Founded: June 9, 1994; 32 years ago (Sheung Shui Store)
- Headquarters: Hong Kong
- Divisions: Jumpin Gym; j-plus; Children Foundation
- Subsidiaries: Planet J; Pappagallo
- Website: www.jumpingym.com

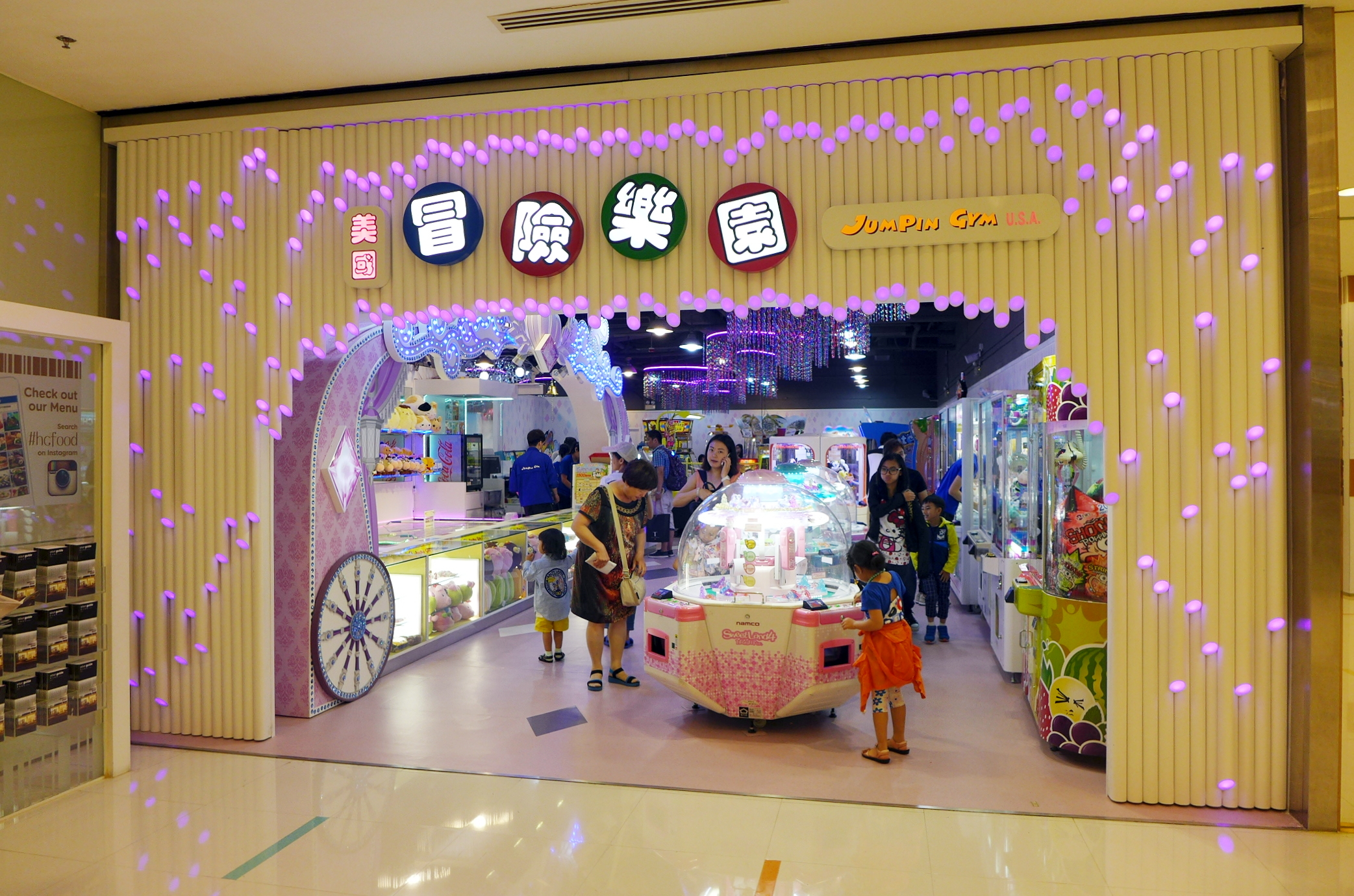
Jumpin Gym U.S.A.'s branch in Ocean Terminal.

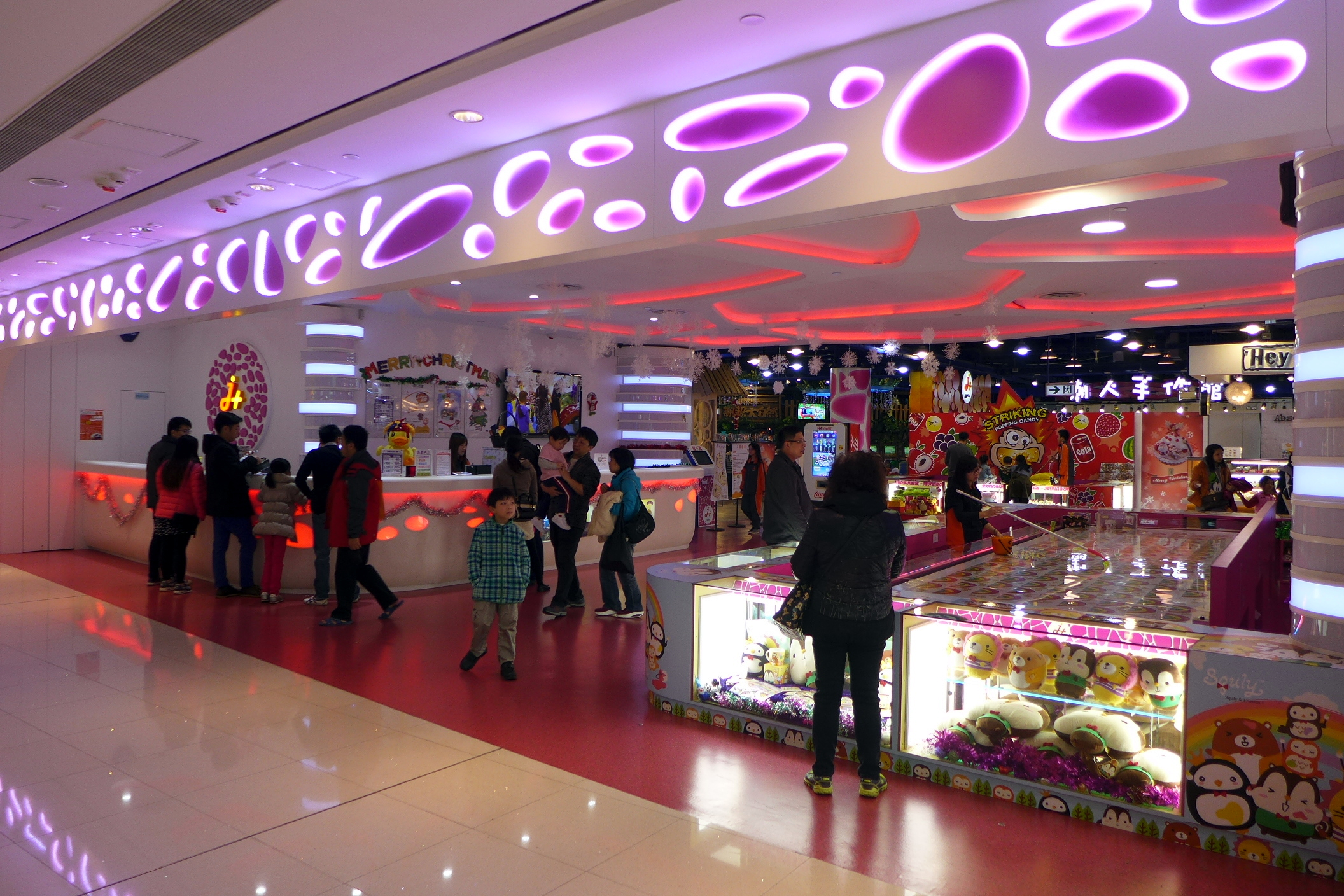
Concept store "j-plus" inside Domain in Yau Tong.

Jumpin Gym U.S.A. Ltd. (commonly known as Jumpin Gym, Chinese: 冒險樂園) is a family entertainment centre company based in Hong Kong.

The company has a total of 32 stores in Hong Kong as of June 2019. It has a leading position in the Hong Kong indoor playground industry, with a market share of approximately 90%. Although the brand name includes the term "U.S.A", the company is based and headquartered in Hong Kong. The first store opened in Sheung Shui Town Centre.

== History ==
On 9 June 1994, businessmen Chen Guohua and Chen Guofu founded Jumpin Gym U.S.A. in Sheung Shui. It was the first company to break the traditional amusement park business model, offering a "value for money" business philosophy, innovation and playground image.

In 1996, Jumpin Gym U.S. organised a "Good Student Incentive Program". The award criteria include class rates, conduct and progress. Over 350,000 students have been rewarded with support from schools, parents and social organisations.

In 1997, the branches were decorated according to different themes.

In 2001, the company published "Adventure Children's Monthly", with "Thunder family" as the mascot.

In 2005, the company set up the "American Adventure Children's Fund" to help children from poor families address their basic living and educational needs through sponsorship and fund-raising activities. At the same time, the donation boxes of ORBIS and Save the Children Society of Hong Kong were donated to the branches of nursery operations and the international community of Hong Kong. In November, a group of volunteers participated in volunteer work.

In 2006, Jumpin Gym U.S. participated in "no plastic bag day". Store manager He Yuyi and her boyfriend Lin Henghui were charged with creating a pseudonym and presenting false information to apply for membership cards. They were arrested by the Hong Kong Independent Commission Against Corruption, cautioned against conspiracy to commit theft, and sentenced to 80 hours of community service.

In 2007, the "American Adventure Children's Fund" launched the "Little Angels" Campus Support Scheme. It received support from more than 30 kindergartens. Over 2000 volunteer children participated in various activities. The number of participants was up to 4000 people and the total number of hours was close to 4500.

In 2010, the "Children's Adventure" group visit program launched to give more children the opportunity to enjoy the facilities of the "American Adventure" free of charge.

In 2013 February, the United States adventure park in Yau Tong Domain became the first "j-plus" amusement park. The "j-plus" playground offered baking classes, later extended to other American Adventure Park branches.

In 2019, the company decided to open 6 stores, including one in Time Square in Causeway Bay.

== Branches ==
As of May 2015, the US Adventure Park in Hong Kong, had opened 34 stores. They were mostly located in large shopping malls, like Citygate. The first store is in Sheung Shui which was opened in Sheung Shui and Whampoa Garden is Hong Kong's largest indoor playground.

Although the various branches are similar in terms of facilities, they have individual themes. For example, the "Treasure Strip" is the theme of one store. In 2011, branches started to standardise their themes.

== Game tokens ==
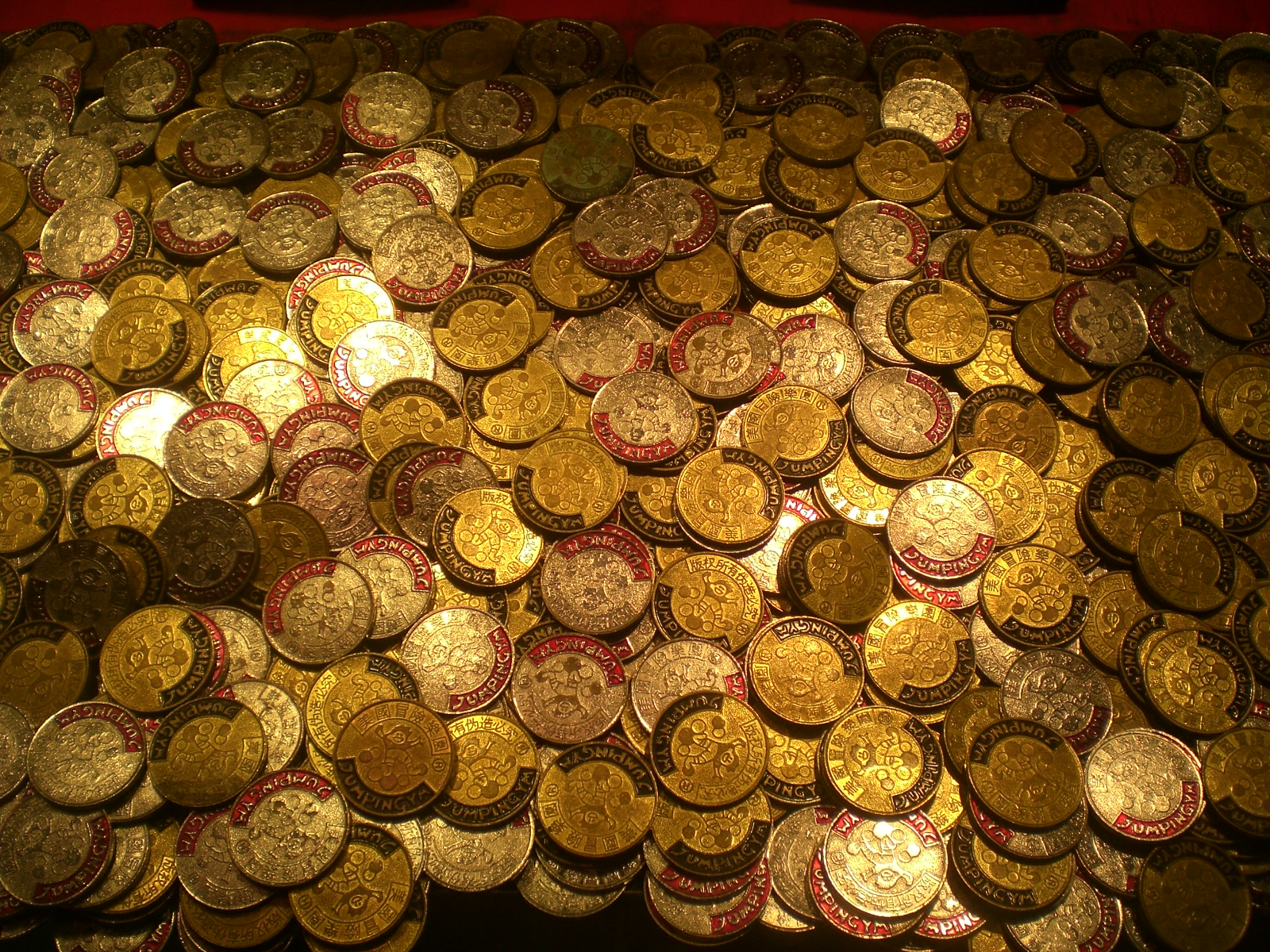
Tokens used inside Jumpin Gym.

Game tokens are priced at HK$2 (ie, 2 against 1). The price have remained unchanged since opening, and cannot be returned as cash.

The United States Adventure Park attracts customers to buy tokens by playing music and making offers.

When a customer purchases a large amount of tokens from the government, they sell at a lower official price (generally HK$1 / 1.5) Some resellers allow customers to convert tokens into cash.

Some stores do not have such a situation, but the American adventure park game facilities still attract housewives and the elderly crowd. A study by the Hong Kong Centre for Women and Family Fun Centre, conducted by Zion Social Service from October 2006 to March 2007, showed that 28% of the respondents visited the Game Centre (including the American Adventure) monthly more than 20 times a month, 80% of them spend at least HK$100 each time, and one retired old man spends $20,000 per month playing games in the game centre.

== Membership policy ==
The company has a membership system where customers can acquire some 1,000 prizes, including furniture and designer household appliances, for a minimum of HK$30 for a two-year membership.

In 2000, the "Membership Smart Card System" was introduced to reduce the use of traditional paper tickets. As of 2005, the company said it had saved paper weight by more than 1 kiloton. Paper rewards used recycled paper.

== Other business ==
Since the early 2000s, American Adventure has expanded its business, including an ice cream shop Pappagallo「伯伯加奴」and Jumpinstation「冒險機地」Internet cafes.

In early 2008, they opened "Breadtalk Breadtalk", a bakery on the mainland with 10 stores.

== See also ==
- Pappagallo
- Jumpinstation
- The Wonderful World of Whimsy
- Chuck E. Cheese's
- Pink Swan Party
- Dragon Centre
