= Ed Wilson (baseball) =

American baseball player

- Pitcher
- Born: January 3, 1875; Bellevue, Pennsylvania, U.S.

Negro league baseball debut
- 1900, for the Cuban Giants

Last appearance
- 1907, for the Philadelphia Giants

Teams
- Cuban Giants (1900); Philadelphia Giants (1906–1907)

Edward Mathew Wilson (January 3, 1875 – death date unknown) was an American Negro league pitcher in the 1900s.

A native of Bellevue, Pennsylvania, Wilson made his Negro leagues debut in 1900 with the Cuban Giants. He went on to play for the Philadelphia Giants in 1906 and 1907.
