= Ed Wilson (media executive) =

American media executive

- Born: Rison, Arkansas, U.S.
- Education: University of Arkansas (BS/BA)
- Occupation: Media executive
- Years active: 1980–present
- Spouse: Leslie Zahn Wilson

Ed Wilson is an American media executive. He has been president of Chicago-based Tribune Broadcasting and has held top-level executive roles with Fox Television Network, NBC Enterprises and CBS Enterprises.

Wilson sits on the board of the USO and the board of trustees at Southern Methodist University as well its Cox School of Business. He is also a member of the Arkansas Entertainers Hall of Fame. He graduated from the University of Arkansas and began his career in 1980 as a sales trainee for Viacom.

== Life ==
Wilson was born and raised in Rison, Arkansas, and graduated from the University of Arkansas with a BS/BA in finance. His career began in 1980 as a sales trainee for Viacom. Wilson later worked for KATV, Channel 7 in Little Rock as a sales manager.

== Career ==
In the early 1990s, Ed Wilson was a sales executive at Columbia TriStar Television Distribution specializing in syndication. He befriended colleague Bob Cook, and together, they helped syndicate Ricki Lake and Seinfeld off-network. In 1994, Wilson and Cook struck a partnership with station group A. H. Belo, opening up their own syndication studio, MaXaM Entertainment.

Despite being a small distribution company, MaXam was geared towards handling off-network sales for the major studios. In MaXam's first season, the studio distributed a talk show called “J & I,” weekend series “PSI Factor: Chronicles of the Paranormal,” “Extremists” with volleyball star Gabriel Reece and a Hall of Fame movie package on the Hallmark Channel. At the end of 1995, A. H. Belo executives initiated the sale of MaXam to CBS that would finalize in January 1996.

On February 11, 1996, Wilson was named president and chief operating officer of CBS Enterprises and Entertainment. Domestic and international sales of CBS network programming, as well as production of original programming for syndication and cable were Wilson’s responsibilities. In July, 2000, Wilson opted not to renew his contract with CBS to pursue other opportunities.

After leaving CBS Enterprises, Wilson was hired by NBC in September 2000 to create and helm NBC Enterprises, a distribution and syndication branch of NBC. Wilson's four years at NBC included overseeing global distribution (including foreign and domestic syndication), marketing ancillary products such as home video, merchandising, licensing, music and publishing, as well as directing domestic and international co-productions and co-ventures. In light of a pending merger with Universal Television, he left NBC in 2004 to become president of FOX Television Network.

Wilson served as president of the Fox Television Network from 2004 to 2008. In this position he was responsible for network sports and entertainment sales, legal, standards and practices along with Fox’s 200 affiliate stations. Wilson aided in expanding Fox’s content distribution, enabling the company to syndicate 100% of its primetime television to affiliates and explore new methods of digital distribution, such as Apple Company’s iTunes.

After acquiring Tribune Company in a leveraged buyout in April 2007, Sam Zell hired Wilson as president of Tribune Broadcasting in February 2008 as part of a new management team led by Randy Michaels. In December 2008, Wilson was named chief revenue officer of Tribune Company expanding his role beyond that of Tribune Broadcasting. Wilson resigned from Tribune in April 2010. From a pending Local TV acquisition, Tribune Broadcasting agreed to sell three stations WTKR, WGNT, and Scranton, Pennsylvania station WNEP-TV to Wilson’s Dreamcatcher Broadcasting, the stations to be operated by Tribune under shared service agreements.

In 2020, Wilson was appointed executive chairman of both CoxReps, a national company representing television, and Gamut, a digital advertising firm, both portfolio companies of Apollo Investment Corporation, a business development company.

== Awards ==
- 2006: Beta Gamma Sigma honorary initiate in the Sam M. Walton College of Business of the University of Arkansas
- 2007: Outstanding Alumni, University of Arkansas
- 2023: Lifetime Achievement Award, Sam M. Walton College of Business of the University of Arkansas
