= Ed Wilson (artist) =

African-American sculptor (1925–1996)

Edward N. Wilson, Jr. (March 28, 1925 – November 26, 1996) was an African-American sculptor. His work was featured in the landmark 1976 exhibition Two Centuries of Black American Art.

== Early life ==
Wilson was born in Baltimore, Maryland, in a fairly well off family; his mother was a teacher and his father was a college administrator. As a child Wilson got sick with rheumatic fever and spent his time while recovering making buildings and other structures which were among his first artistic pursuits.

In 1943, Wilson was accepted to attend the University of Iowa as a student of art, yet before he was able to begin his college career he was drafted into service for World War II. Under the U.S military branch of the Air Force, Wilson was a part of a "house keeping" unit under a highly prejudiced officer who singled out Wilson and the only other black member of the unit, continuously holding them back from progressing in position, according to Wilson "to teach them a lesson". Experiences such as these became formative inspirations behind many of Wilson's socially responsive works such as Minority Man (1957), which is currently displayed at Binghamton University.

== Career ==
While his family taught him to look outside of academics, he eventually found a home in academia which "provided a base for the thought, reflection, and stimulation in preparation for participation in the broader social and artistic struggles" of his time.

Wilson was a fixture of the art department at North Carolina College, a historically black college. Unfortunately, the isolation of the college made him feel as though he did "not exist locally as an artist".

Wilson joined the faculty of the State University of New York at Binghamton to develop a studio art program (he was the first visual arts faculty at the school) and became chairman of the art and art history departments in 1964. Wilson worked there until 1992, when he retired. He completed many public art commissions in the Binghamton area throughout his time at the school, such a three-acre memorial park in honor of President John F. Kennedy which was commissioned by the Binghamton Sun-Bulletin Fund.

Much of Wilson's work was influenced by jazz and believed that "the education of the American artist, whether he is black or white, should include exposure to African art, American jazz, the psychodynamics of the American scene". He saw a great vitality under American racial tensions and "'[wanted] to see it erupt' aesthetically".
