= Edward A. Wilson (illustrator) =

American painter

- Born: Edward Arthur Wilson; March 4, 1886; Glasgow, Scotland
- Died: October 2, 1970 (aged 84); Dobbs Ferry, New York, U.S.
- Education: Art Institute of Chicago
- Known for: Book and magazine illustrations

Edward Arthur Wilson (March 4, 1886 – October 2, 1970) was an American illustrator, printmaker and commercial artist best known for his book and magazine illustrations.

== Early life ==
Wilson was born on March 4, 1886, in Glasgow, Scotland; one of two sons born to Edward J. Wilson and Euphemia E. Murray. In 1893, the family emigrated to the United States and by no later than 1900, the family had settled in Chicago. Edward attended the Art Institute of Chicago, and later studied with illustrator Howard Pyle.

== Career ==
In 1921, Wilson designed the cover for William McFee's An Engineer's Notebook. His first full-length project was Iron Men and Wooden Ships (1924), a collection of sailor shanties edited by author and bookseller Frank Shay. Over the next two decades, Wilson illustrated many classic novels, including Robinson Crusoe (1930), The Man Without a Country (1936), Treasure Island (1941), and Jane Eyre (1944). Later, he produced illustrations for magazines and a number of World War II propaganda posters; a number of these are included in Thomas Craven's The Book of Edward A. Wilson (1948). In 1945, Wilson's work was featured in Life Magazine.

== Personal life ==
Wilson was married to Jane Roe and they had two daughters, one of whom was the actress Perry Wilson.

== Death ==
On October 2, 1970, after a long struggle with an undisclosed illness, Wilson died at the age of 84 in Dobbs Ferry.

== Works ==
=== Books ===
- Shay, Frank, ed. Iron Men and Wooden Ships. Garden City, NY: Doubleday, Page & Company.
- Rogers, Cameron, ed. (1925). Full and By; Being a Collection of Verses by Persons of Quality with Designs to Fit All Humours. Garden City, NY: Doubleday, Page & Company.
- Dana, Richard Henry (1930). Two Years Before the Mast. Chicago: Lakeside Press.
- Attiwill, Ken (1931). Windjammer. Garden City, NY: Doubleday, Doran & Company.
- DeFoe, Daniel (1930). Robinson Crusoe. New York: Heritage Press.
- Fennimore, Daniel (1932) Last of the Mohicans. Avon, Conn: Heritage Press.
- Hudson, William Henry (1935). Green Mansions. New York: Limited Editions Club.
- Loomis, Alfred Loomis (1939). Ranging the Main Coast. New York: Norton.
- McMurtrie, Douglas C.; Farran, Don; Wilson, Edward A., illustrations (1940). Wings for Words. New York: Rand, McNally & Company.
- Wilson, Edward; Wright Marine Collection (1941). Blow High, Blow Low. New York: American Artists Group. OCLC 1057086125.
- Longfellow, Henry Wadsworth; Candy, Henry Seidel (1947). Favorite Poems of Henry Wadsworth Longfellow. Garden City, NY: Doubleday & Company.
- Shay, Frank, ed. (1948). American Sea Songs and Chanteys. New York: W.W. Norton.
- Mathers, Edward Powys; Mardrus, J. C.; Forester, Cecil Scott (1949). The Seven Voyages of Sinbad the Sailor, Volume 1. New York: Limited Editions Club.

=== Magazines ===
- Rogers, Cameron (November 1924). "Sailors' Songs and Whalers' Stories". World's Work. pp. 108–111
- Service, Robert W. (December 1929). "A New ballad of the Yukon: Sandy MacPherson Held the Floor". Cosmopolitan. pp. 46–47
- Filene, Edward A. (October 1930). "The Road to Freedom". The Rotarian. pp. 9–11, 62–64
- Ludwig, Emil (January 1933). "Statesmen—Amateur or Professional?". The Rotarian. pp. 6–9, 54–55
- Dimnet, Abbé Ernest (January 1935). "We Owe a Debt". The Rotarian. pp. 17–18, 59–60

== Collections ==
Wilson's work is held in the following permanent collection:

- National Gallery of Art, Washington, D.C.: 7 works (as of 7 May 2022)
