= Ed Wilson (singer) =

Brazilian singer (1945–2010)

- Born: Edson Vieira de Barros; July 29, 1945; Rio de Janeiro, Rio de Janeiro, Brazil
- Died: October 3, 2010 (aged 65) Rio de Janeiro, Rio de Janeiro, Brazil
- Genres: Rock and roll, MPB, gospel
- Years active: 1958–2010

Ed Wilson (July 29, 1945 – October 3, 2010), born Edson Vieira de Barros, was a Brazilian rock singer-songwriter and founder of the musical group Renato e Seus Blue Caps. Once part of the Jovem Guarda movement, he was later linked to the Gospel music scene.

Ed Wilson died on October 3, 2010, in Rio de Janeiro due to cancer.

== Discography ==
=== Albums ===
Year	Title	Label
1962	Nunca mais / Juro meu amor	Odeon
1963	Doidinha por mim / Telefonema	Odeon
1963	Ed Wilson	Odeon
1964	Sabor de sal / Bronzeadíssima	RCA
1964	O carro do papai / Patrulha da cidade	RCA
1965	Doce esperança / Como te adoro menina	RCA
1966	Verdadeiro amor	CBS
1983	Chuva de Bênçãos	
1991	Te Amo Tanto	Line Records
1994	Minha Estrada	Line Records
1997	Uma Força No Ar	Line Records
2003	Seleção de Ouro	Line Records
2003	Fé E Vitória	Top Gospel
