= Billy (name) =

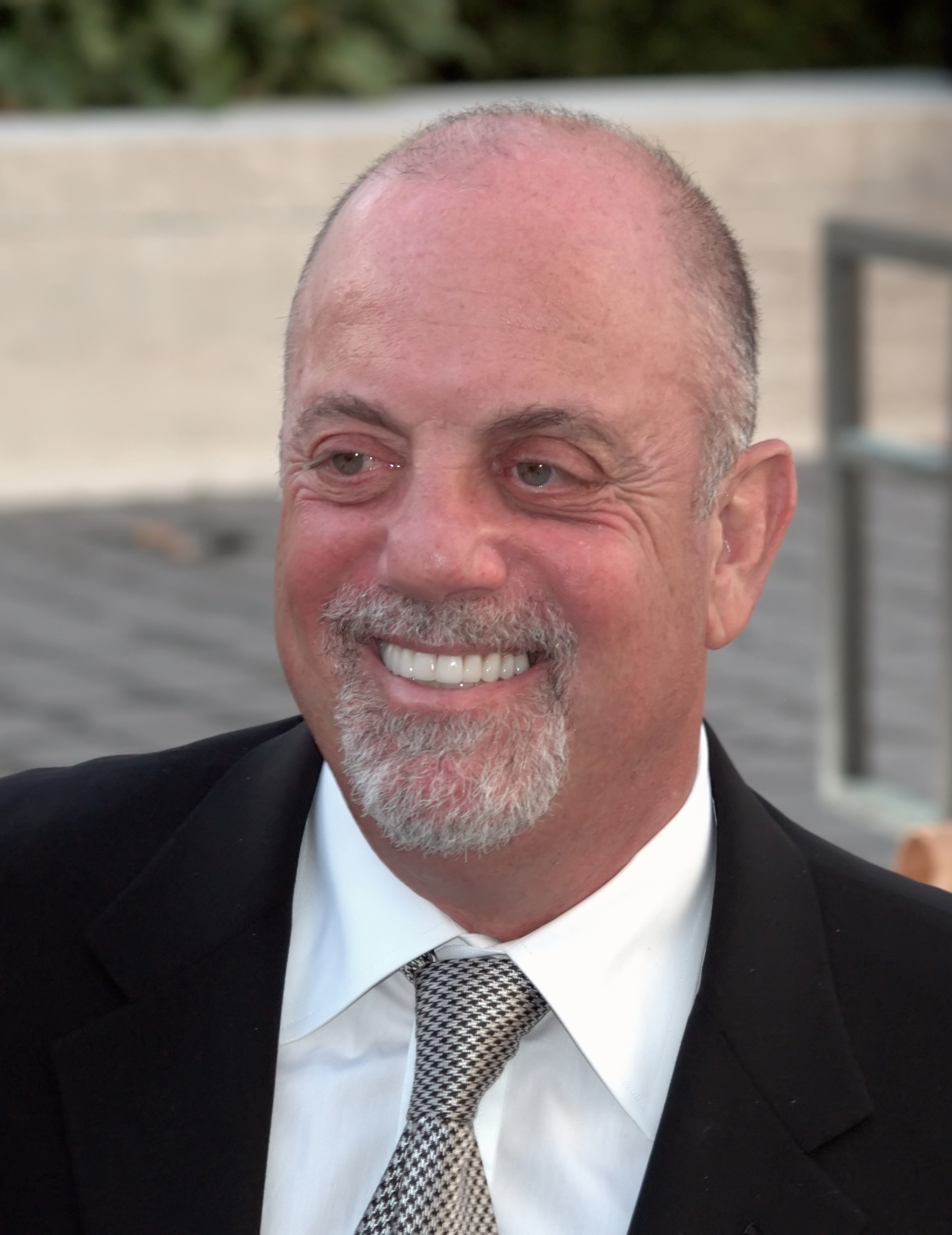
- Billy Joel in 2009
- Pronunciation: /bɪli/
- Gender: Male

Other names
- Related names: William, Bill

Billy is a given name short for William. A spelling variant is Billie. Notable people with the name include:

- Billy & Louie, British contestant on The Voice UK series 13
- Billy the Artist (1964–2022), American artist and writer
- Billy the Axeman (active c. 1898–1912), American suspected serial killer
- Billy the Kid (disambiguation), several people
- Billy "The Texan" Longley (1926–2014), Australian convicted murderer
- Billy Abercromby (1958–2024), Scottish footballer
- Billy Abit Joo (born 1949), Malaysian politician
- Billy Abner Mayaya (born 1964), Malawian human rights activist, artist, poet, and theologian
- Billy Adair, American ASL player
- Billy Adam, Scottish association footballer
- Billy Adam Calvert (born 1978), American politician and businessman
- Billy Adams (disambiguation), several people
- Billy Agnew (fl. 1898–1927), Scottish footballer
- Billy Al Bengston (1934–2022), American visual artist and sculptor
- Billy Alford (born 1981), American AFL player
- Billy Allen (1917–1981), English footballer
- Billy Alton, American football coach
- Billy Álvarez (born 1945), Mexican businessman, footballer, and criminal
- Billy Alvord (1863–1927), American MLB player
- Billy Amick (born 2002), American MLB player
- Billy Amstell (1911–2005), British jazz reedist
- Billy Anderson (disambiguation), several people
- Billy Andrade (born 1964), American professional golfer
- Billy Andrews (born 1945), American NFL player
- Billy Andrews (footballer) (fl. 1886–1923), Irish international footballer
- Billy Annis (1874–1938), English footballer
- Billy Apple (1935–2021), New Zealand artist
- Billy Arce (born 1998), Ecuadorian footballer
- Billy Ard (born 1959), American NFL player
- Billy Argyros, Greek Australian poker player
- Billy Arjan Singh (1917–2010), Indian hunter turned conservationist and author
- Billy Armfield (1904–1985), English professional footballer
- Billy Armstrong (disambiguation), several people
- Billy Arnison (1924–1996), South African professional footballer
- Billy Arnold (disambiguation), several people
- Billy Arnott (1873–1962), Australian VFL player
- Billy Aronson, American playwright and writer
- Billy Ashcroft (born 1952), English footballer
- Billy Ashley (born 1970), American MLB player
- Billy Askew (born 1959), English footballer
- Billy Atherton (1905–1976), English footballer
- Billy Atkins (American football) (1934–1991), American NFL and AFL player
- Billy Austin (disambiguation), several people
- Billy Autrey (1933–2020), American NFL player
- Billy Ayre (1952–2002), English footballer
- Billy Baber (born 1979), American NFL player
- Billy Backus (born 1943), American professional boxer
- Billy Baggett (1929–2015), American NFL player
- Billy Bailey (disambiguation), several people
- Billy Bainbridge (born 1997), Australian professional rugby league footballer
- Billy Baird (1884–1968), Canadian PAC, IPHL, NHA, and NHL player
- Billy Baird (footballer) (fl. 1876–1897), Scottish footballer
- Billy Bairstow, English footballer
- Billy Bajema (born 1982), American college football and NFL player
- Billy Baker (disambiguation), several people
- Billy Bakker (born 1988), Dutch field hockey player
- Billy Balbastro (1940–2008), Filipino lawyer and entertainment columnist
- Billy Baldwin (disambiguation), several people
- Billy Bales (1929–2023), English international motorcycle speedway rider
- Billy Ball (1876–1929), English footballer
- Billy Ballew, American businessman; owner of Billy Ballew Motorsports
- Billy Balmer (1875–1961), English footballer
- Billy Bancroft (1871–1959), Welsh international rugby union player and cricketer
- Billy Bancroft (coach) (1904–1993), American college football, basketball, and baseball coach
- Billy Bang (1947–2011), American free jazz violinist and composer
- Billy Banks (disambiguation), several people
- Billy Banner (1878–1936), English footballer
- Billy Bannister (1878–1942), English professional footballer
- Billy Barber (disambiguation), several people
- Billy Barbour (1865–1900), Scottish footballer
- Billy Barham (born 1952), Australian VFL player
- Billy Barker (disambiguation), several people
- Billy Barlow (1870–1963), Canadian ice hockey player
- Billy Barnes (disambiguation), several people
- Billy Barnie (1853–1900), American MLB manager and player
- Billy Baron (born 1990), American professional basketball player
- Billy Barr (disambiguation), several people
- Billy Barratt (born 2006/2007), English actor
- Billy Barrett (1893–1979), English footballer
- Billy Barty (1924–2000), American actor and activist
- Billy Baskette (1884–1949), American pianist and composer
- Billy Bassett (1869–1937), English association footballer, director, and club chairman
- Billy Bassett (Welsh footballer) (1912–1977), Welsh professional footballer
- Billy Bates (disambiguation), several people
- Billy Batten (1889–1959), English professional rugby league footballer
- Billy Batty (fl. 1886–1922), English footballer
- Billy Bauer (1915–2005), American jazz guitarist
- Billy Baulch (c. 1955–1972), American murder victim
- Billy Baum (born 1946), Puerto Rican Olympic basketball player
- Billy Baumhoff (born 1973), American soccer player
- Billy Bawlf (1881–1972), Canadian ice hockey player
- Billy Baxter (disambiguation), several people
- Billy Beach, alternate name of James Carter Cathcart (born 1954), American voice actor, script adaptor, voice director, pianist, and vocalist
- Billy Beal (1874–1968), Canadian sawmill engineer
- Billy Beall (born 1977), English footballer
- Billy Bean (disambiguation), several people
- Billy Beane (born 1962), American MLB player and front office executive
- Billy Beasley (born 1940), American politician
- Billy Beats (1871–1936), English international footballer
- Billy Beattie (c. 1889–1917), Scottish professional rugby league footballer
- Billy Beaumont (1883–1911), English footballer
- Billy Becher (1915–2000), Irish cricketer
- Billy Beck (1920–2011), American clown and character actor
- Billy Beck (musician), American member of funk band Ohio Players
- Billy Beckett (1915–1999), English footballer
- Billy Beckett (Scottish footballer) (fl. 1951–1957)
- Billy Beechers (born 1987), English professional footballer
- Billy Beer (footballer) (1879–1958), English professional footballer
- Billy Beggs (1878–1957), Australian VFL player
- Billy Behan (1911–1991), Irish footballer and manager
- Billy Beldham (1766–1862), English professional cricketer
- Billy Bell (disambiguation), several people
- Billy Belshaw (1914–1975), English professional rugby league footballer
- Billy Bender (born 2001), American rower
- Billy Bennett (disambiguation), several people
- Billy Bennington (1900–1986), English hammered dulcimer player
- Billy Benn Perrurle (c. 1943–2012), Alyawarre landscape artist
- Billy Bentham, English professional rugby league footballer
- Billy Benton (1895–1967), English professional footballer
- Billy Benyon (born 1945), English professional rugby league footballer
- Billy Berg (fl. 1945–1962), American jazz club owner
- Billy Bernard (born 1991), Luxembourgian international footballer
- Billy Berntsson (born 1984), Swedish footballer
- Billy Berroa (1928–2007), Dominican broadcaster
- Billy Bertram (1897–1962), English professional footballer
- Billy Besson (born 1981), French competitive sailor
- Billy Best (born 1942), English professional footballer
- Billy Bestwick (1875–1938), English cricketer
- Billy Betts (1864–1941), English footballer
- Billy Bevan (1887–1957), Australian-born vaudevillian who became an American film actor
- Billy Bevis (1918–1994), English footballer
- Billy Bibby, Welsh member of rock bands Billy Bibby & The Wry Smiles and Catfish and the Bottlemen
- Billy Bibit (1950–2009), Filipino military leader
- Billy Biggar (1874–1935), English professional footballer
- Billy Bigley (born 1962), American racing driver
- Billy Billett (1888–1956), Australian VFL player
- Billy Bilsland (born 1945), Scottish professional racing cyclist
- Billy Bingham (1931–2022), Northern Irish international footballer and manager
- Billy Bingham (footballer, born 1990) (born 1990), English professional footballer
- Billy Birch (1831–1897), American minstrel performer
- Billy Bird (1899–1951), British professional boxer
- Billy Birmingham (born 1953), Australian humorist and sports journalist
- Billy Birrell (1897–1968), Scottish professional footballer
- Billy Bischoff (1912–1988), Australian rugby league footballer
- Billy Bischoff Jr. (1938–2023), Australian professional rugby league footballer
- Billy Bishop (1894–1956), Canadian World War I flying ace
- Billy Bisseker (1863–1902), English footballer
- Billy Bitter (born 1988), American professional lacrosse player
- Billy Bitzer (1872–1944), American cinematographer
- Billy Bizor (1913–1969), American Texas blues harmonicist, singer, and songwriter
- Billy Blackie (born 1963), Scottish footballer
- Billy Blackman (1895–1969), Australian VFL player
- Billy Blake (fl. 1902–1926), English professional footballer
- Billy Blan (1922–2008), English professional rugby league footballer
- Billy Blanco (1924–2011), Brazilian architect, musician, composer, and writer
- Billy Bland (disambiguation), several people
- Billy Blanks (born 1955), American actor, martial artist, and fitness personality
- Billy Blanks Jr., American fitness personality; son of the above
- Billy Bletcher (1894–1979), American actor
- Billy Block (1955–2015), American musician, journalist, actor, publisher, and television- and radio personality
- Billy Bloomfield (1939–2003), English footballer
- Billy Blue (c. 1767–1834), African-American convict transported to Australia
- Billy Bluelight (1859–1949), English flower vendor and cult figure
- Billy Blunt (1886–1962), English footballer
- Billy Bly (1920–1982), English professional footballer
- Billy Blyth (1895–1968), Scottish footballer
- Billy Blyton, Baron Blyton (1899–1987), British politician
- Billy Boardman (1895–1968), English footballer
- Billy Boat (born 1966), American open-wheel driver
- Billy Bob, several people
- Billy Bock (1935–2003), American college- and high school baseball coach
- Billy Bodin (born 1992), English-Welsh professional footballer
- Billy Boles (disambiguation), several people
- Billy Bolger (1910–1977), Australian professional golfer
- Billy Boljevic (1952–2023), Yugoslavian professional footballer
- Billy Bolt (born 1997), English motorcycle rider
- Billy Bond (born 1944), Italian musician; member of Argentine supergroup Billy Bond y La Pesada del Rock and Roll
- Billy Bonds (1946–2025), English footballer and manager
- Billy Bones (musician), American member of punk rock band The BillyBones
- Billy Bong, ring name of Josh Abercrombie (born 1984), American professional wrestler
- Billy Bookout (1932–2008), American football player and coach
- Billy Booth (disambiguation), several people
- Billy Bootle (1926–2012), English footballer
- Billy Borland (1888–1915), Scottish professional footballer
- Billy Boslem (born 1958), English footballer
- Billy Bostock (1943–1996), Scottish footballer
- Billy Boston (born 1934), Welsh professional rugby league footballer
- Billy Bottrill (1903–1986), English professional footballer
- Billy Boucher (1899–1958), Canadian NHL player
- Billy Bowden (born 1963), New Zealand cricket umpire and player
- Billy Bowen (1897–1960), Welsh dual-code rugby union- and professional rugby league footballer
- Billy Bower (1887–1954), English footballer
- Billy Bowers (disambiguation), several people
- Billy Bowes, Scottish professional footballer
- Billy Bowie (born 1966), Scottish businessman
- Billy Bowlegs (disambiguation), several people
- Billy Bowman Jr. (born 2003), American college football player
- Billy Boy (disambiguation), several people
- Billy Boyce (1927–2011), Australian boxer
- Billy Boyd (disambiguation), several people
- Billy Boyle, Irish film, television, and stage actor and singer
- Billy Boyo (1969–2000), Jamaican reggae artist
- Billy Bradshaw (disambiguation), several people
- Billy Brae (1902–1968), Scottish footballer
- Billy Bragg (born 1957), English singer, songwriter, musician, author, and political activist
- Billy Branch (born 1951), American blues harmonica player and singer
- Billy Brawn (1878–1932), English international footballer
- Billy Bray (1794–1868), Cornish preacher
- Billy Breakenridge (1846–1931), American lawman, teamster, railroader, soldier, and author
- Billy Breen (1882–1927), Canadian MHA player
- Billy Bremner (disambiguation), several people
- Billy Brennan (1934–2020), Scottish ice hockey player
- Billy Bretherton, American entomologist, pest control technician, and television presenter of Billy the Exterminator
- Billy Brewer (disambiguation), several people
- Billy Brick, Irish hurler
- Billy Bridgeman (1882–1947), English professional footballer
- Billy Bridges (born 1984), Canadian ice sledge hockey- and wheelchair basketball player
- Billy Bridgewater (1886–1941), English footballer
- Billy Briggs (born 1977), American independent musician and songwriter
- Billy Brimblecom (born 1977), American drummer
- Billy Brimstone, alternate name of Jehst (born 1979), English rapper and producer
- Billy Briscoe (1896–1994), English footballer
- Billy Briscoe (Australian footballer) (1892–1943), Australian VFL player
- Billy Brittain (born 1994), Australian professional rugby league footballer
- Billy Broadbent (1901–1979), English professional footballer
- Billy Broderick (1908–1946), Irish swimmer
- Billy Bromage, English footballer
- Billy Brooks (born 1953), American NFL player
- Billy Brooks (footballer) (born 2004), Irish professional footballer
- Billy Broomfield (born 1945), American politician
- Billy Brown (disambiguation), several people
- Billy Brownless (born 1967), Australian AFL player
- Billy Bryan (born 1955), American NFL player
- Billy Bryan (baseball) (born 1938), American MLB player
- Billy Bryan (footballer) (1912–1944), English professional footballer
- Billy Bryans (1947–2012), Canadian percussionist, songwriter, music producer, and DJ
- Billy Bryant (1913–1975), English footballer
- Billy Bryk (born 1999), Canadian actor and filmmaker
- Billy Buchanan (1924–1999), Scottish professional footballer
- Billy Buckner (born 1983), American MLB pitcher
- Billy Bullock (1884/1885–1963), English flat racing jockey
- Billy Bulmer (1881–1936), English public servant and professional rugby league footballer
- Billy Burch (1900–1950), American-born Canadian NHL player
- Billy Burden (1914–1994), English actor and comedian
- Billy Burke (disambiguation), several people
- Billy Burnet (1886–1958), Scotland international rugby union player
- Billy Burnett (1926–1988), English professional footballer
- Billy Burnette (born 1953), American guitarist, singer, songwriter, and actor
- Billy Burnikell (1910–1980), English professional football player and manager
- Billy Burns (disambiguation), several people
- Billy Bush (born 1971), American radio- and television host
- Billy Bush (record producer), American record producer, audio engineer, and mixer
- Billy Butler (disambiguation), several people
- Billy Butlin (1899–1980), South African-born English-Canadian entrepreneur
- Billy Butterfield (1917–1988), American jazz bandleader, trumpeter, flugelhornist, and cornetist
- Billy Byers (1927–1996), American jazz trombonist and arranger
- Billy Byrd (1920–2001), American country- and jazz guitarist and studio musician
- Billy Byrne (disambiguation), several people
- Billy C. Hawkins, American academic administrator and teacher
- Billy C. Sanders (born 1936), American Navy senior sailor
- Billy C. Wirtz (born 1954), American blues musician, comedian, and writer
- Billy Cafaro (1936–2021), Argentine rock and roll singer
- Billy Cairns (1914–1988), English footballer
- Billy Caldwell (1782–1841), American part-Scots-Irish and part-Mohawk- or Shawnee fur trader
- Billy Callender (1903–1932), English professional footballer
- Billy Cameron (1896–1972), Canadian NHL player
- Billy Campbell (disambiguation), several people
- Billy Campfield (born 1956), American NFL player
- Billy Cann (1882–1958), Australian rugby league footballer
- Billy Cannon (1937–2018), American AFL and NFL player
- Billy Cannon Jr. (born 1961), American NFL player; son of the above
- Billy Carden (1924–2004), American stock car racing driver
- Billy Carlson (1889–1915), American racing driver
- Billy Carr (1905–1989), English professional footballer
- Billy Carroll (born 1959), Canadian NHL player
- Billy Carson (actor), American actor and musician
- Billy Carter (1937–1988), American farmer, businessman, brewer, and politician
- Billy Carter (ice hockey) (1937–2024), Canadian NHL player
- Billy Caryll (1892–1953), English comedian
- Billy Caskey (born 1954), Northern Irish NIFL, EFL, NASL, and MISL player
- Billy Casper (1931–2015), American professional golfer
- Billy Castle (born 1992), English professional snooker player
- Billy Caulfield (1892–1972), English professional footballer
- Billy Celeski (born 1985), Macedonian-born Australian footballer
- Billy Cesare (born 1955), American NFL player
- Billy Chadwick (footballer) (born 2000), English professional footballer
- Billy Chalmers (1907–1980), Scottish association footballer and manager
- Billy Chan (born 1960), Hong Kong-born Australian medical simulation specialist, educator, and humanitarian
- Billy Chandler (1876–1924), American racing driver
- Billy Chapel, American ice skater
- Billy Chapin (1943–2016), American child actor
- Billy Chapman (footballer) (1902–1967), English footballer
- Billy Charlton (1900–1981), English footballer
- Billy Chase, American college football player
- Billy Chemirmir (1972–2023), Kenyan-born American murderer and suspected serial killer
- Billy Chesser (1893–1949), English professional footballer
- Billy Childish (born 1959), English painter, author, poet, photographer, film maker, singer, and guitarist
- Billy Childs (born 1957), American composer, jazz pianist, arranger, and conductor
- Billy Chiles (born 1985), American soccer player
- Billy Chinook (c. 1827–1890), Native American Wasco chief
- Billy Chow (born 1958), Hong Kong-Canadian professional kickboxer and actor
- Billy Christmas (1879–1941), Canadian ice hockey-, lacrosse-, and football player
- Billy Chung, Hong Kong film director and producer
- Billy Ciancaglini, American defense attorney; candidate in the 2019 Philadelphia mayoral election
- Billy Ciotto (1929–2021), American politician
- Billy Clanton (1862–1881), American outlaw cowboy
- Billy Clapper (born 1982), American basketball coach
- Billy Clark (disambiguation), several people
- Billy Clarke (disambiguation), several people
- Billy Clarkson (1891–1954), English professional footballer
- Billy Clay (born 1944), American NFL player
- Billy Clayson (1897–1973), English professional footballer
- Billy Cleaver (1921–2003), Welsh WRU player
- Billy Clements (active in the 1920s and 1930s), English professional rugby league footballer and coach
- Billy Clevenger (born 1977), American professional stock car racing driver
- Billy Clifford (disambiguation), several people
- Billy Clingman (1869–1958), American MLB player
- Billy Cobb (1940–2021), English footballer
- Billy Cobham (born 1944), Panamanian-American jazz drummer
- Billy Coggins (1901–1958), English footballer
- Billy Cole (born 1965), English shot putter
- Billy Cole (footballer) (1909–1958), Australian VFL player
- Billy Coleman (born 1947), Irish motorsport rally driver
- Billy Colgan (fl. 1884–1895), American MLB player
- Billy Collings (born 1940), Scottish footballer
- Billy Collins (disambiguation), several people
- Billy Compton (1896–1976), English footballer
- Billy Congreve (1891–1916), English recipient of the Victoria Cross
- Billy Conigliaro (1947–2021), American MLB player
- Billy Conn (1917–1993), American professional boxer
- Billy Connolly (born 1942), Scottish actor, musician, television presenter, artist, and stand-up comedian
- Billy Connors (1941–2018), American MLB player, coach, and front office official
- Billy Consolo (1934–2008), American MLB player and coach
- Billy Constable (1959–2015), American bluegrass artist
- Billy Contreras (born 1984), American jazz violinist, bluegrass fiddler, multi-instrumentalist, session player, and educator
- Billy Conway (rugby league) (born 1967), English rugby league player
- Billy Conway (drummer) (1956–2021), American drummer; member of rock bands Treat Her Right and Morphine
- Billy Cook (disambiguation), several people
- Billy Coole (1927–2001), English professional footballer
- Billy Cooper (disambiguation), several people
- Billy Copeland (1856–1917), Scottish cricketer
- Billy Corben (born 1978), American documentary film director
- Billy Corgan (born 1967), American guitarist, singer, songwriter, and professional wrestling promoter; frontman of alternative rock band The Smashing Pumpkins
- Billy Corkindale (1901–1972), English footballer
- Billy Cornelius (fl. 1898–1923), English professional footballer and manager
- Billy Cosh (born 1992), American college football coach
- Billy Costa (born 1952), American radio- and television host
- Billy Costello (disambiguation), several people
- Billy Coté, American member of alternative rock band Madder Rose
- Billy Cotton (1899–1969), English band leader and entertainer
- Billy Cotton (footballer, born 1894) (1894–1971), English professional footballer
- Billy Coulthard (fl. 1932–1937), English footballer
- Billy Coutu (1892–1977), Canadian NHL player
- Billy Cowan (born 1938), American MLB player
- Billy Cowan (footballer) (fl. 1896–1930), Scottish professional footballer
- Billy Cowell (fl. 1902–1927), English professional footballer
- Billy Cox (disambiguation), several people
- Billy Coyle (disambiguation), several people
- Billy Cracknell (born 2002), English professional footballer
- Billy Craig (footballer) (1929–2011), Scottish footballer
- Billy Craig (rugby league) (1898–1980), Australian professional rugby league footballer
- Billy Craigie (c. 1953–1998), Aboriginal Australian activist
- Billy Crain (born 1954), American songwriter and musician
- Billy "Crash" Craddock (born 1939), American country- and rockabilly singer
- Billy Crawford (born 1982), Filipino-American actor, musician, singer, comedian, dancer, and television host
- Billy Crawford (American football) (1864–1933), American football player and coach, lawyer, and railroad executive
- Billy Creighton (1892–1970), Canadian NHL player
- Billy Crellin (born 2000), English professional footballer
- Billy Crinson (1883–1951), English professional footballer
- Billy Crocker (born c. 1978), American college football coach
- Billy Crone (1863–1944), Irish footballer
- Billy Crook (disambiguation), several people
- Billy Cross (born 1946), American guitarist, singer, and producer
- Billy Cross (American football) (1929–2013), American NFL player
- Billy Crowell (1865–1935), American MLB pitcher
- Billy Croxon (1871–1949), English footballer
- Billy Crudup (born 1968), American actor
- Billy Crystal (born 1948), American actor, comedian, and filmmaker
- Billy Cundiff (born 1980), American NFL player
- Billy Cunliffe (1897–1942), English professional rugby league footballer
- Billy Cunningham (born 1943), American NBA and ABA player and coach
- Billy Cupit (1908–1992), English professional footballer
- Billy Curley (born 1945), English footballer
- Billy Curran (1890–1944), New Zealand rugby league player
- Billy Currie (born 1950), English multi-instrumentalist and songwriter
- Billy Currington (born 1973), American country singer and songwriter
- Billy Curtis (1909–1988), American film and television actor
- Billy Cusack (born 1966), Scottish judoka
- Billy Dainty (1927–1986), English comedian, dancer, physical comedian, pantomime, and television star
- Billy Dale (disambiguation), several people
- Billy Dallison (1900–1946), British motorcycle speedway rider
- Billy Dalto (born 1976), American politician
- Billy Dalton (1888–1956), Australian rugby league footballer
- Billy Daniels (1915–1988), American singer and actor
- Billy Daniels (footballer) (born 1994), English professional footballer
- Billy Dankert, American musician; member of rock band the Gear Daddies
- Billy Danvers (1886–1964), English comedian and variety show performer
- Billy Danze (born 1974), American member of hip-hop duo M.O.P.
- Billy Dardis (born 1995), Irish rugby union player
- Billy Dare (1927–1994), English footballer
- Billy Dargin (c. 1843–1865), Aboriginal Australian tracker
- Billy Darnell (1926–2007), American professional wrestler
- Billy Davenport (1931–1999), American drummer
- Billy Davies (born 1964), Scottish professional footballer and manager
- Billy Davies (cricketer, born 1936) (1936–2022), Welsh cricketer
- Billy Davies (politician) (1884–1956), Welsh-born Australian politician
- Billy Davies (Welsh footballer) (1881–1962), Welsh international footballer
- Billy Davies (Welsh rugby) (fl. 1931–1939), Welsh rugby union and professional rugby league footballer
- Billy Davis (disambiguation), several people
- Billy Day (1936–2018), English footballer
- Billy Dea (born 1933), Canadian NHL player
- Billy Deakin (1925–2018), English footballer
- Billy Dean (born 1962), American country singer and songwriter
- Billy DeAngelis (born 1946), American ABA player
- Billy Deans (disambiguation), several people
- Billy Death (1900–1984), English professional footballer
- Billy DeBeck (1890–1942), American cartoonist
- Billy Dec, Filipino-American TV personality, background actor, and businessman
- Billy Decker (born 1964), American dirt modified- and late model racing driver
- Billy Dedman (1854–1920), Australian SANFL player
- Billy Dee (born 1951), American adult film actor
- Billy Delves (1870–1908), English footballer
- Billy DeMars (1925–2020), American MLB player and coach
- Billy Denault (born 2000/2001), Canadian politician
- Billy Dennehy (born 1987), Irish footballer and sporting director
- Billy Dennis (English footballer) (1896–1952), English footballer
- Billy Derbyshire (1916–1974), English professional rugby league footballer
- Billy Dervan (1884–1944), New Zealand rugby league player
- Billy Desmond, American musician
- Billy Devaney (born 1955), American football executive
- Billy Deverell (1937–1981), American member of the Wonderland Gang
- Billy Devore (1910–1985), American racing driver
- Billy Dewell (1917–2000), American NFL player
- Billy De Wolfe (1907–1974), American character actor
- Billy Diamond (1949–2010), Canadian Indigenous chief
- Billy Dib (born 1985), Australian professional boxer
- Billy Dick (1889–1960), Australian VFL player
- Billy Dicken (born 1974), American CFL and AFL player
- Billy Dickinson (1906–1968), English footballer
- Billy Dickson, American cinematographer and television director
- Billy Dickson (footballer) (born 1947), Scottish footballer
- Billy Dillicar (1881–1962), New Zealand lawn bowls player
- Billy Dingsdale (1905–1965), English rugby league player
- Billy Dinsdale (1903–1984), English professional footballer
- Billy Disch (1872–1953), American baseball player and coach
- Billy Dixon (1850–1913), American scout and bison hunter
- Billy Dixon (footballer, born 1905) (1905–1956), English professional footballer
- Billy Dixon (footballer, born 1941) (born 1941), Irish association footballer
- Billy Doctrove (born 1955), Dominica international football referee and international cricket umpire
- Billy Dodds (born 1969), Scottish football coach and player
- Billy Doherty, Northern Irish member of rock band The Undertones
- Billy Donkin (1900–1974), English professional footballer
- Billy Donlon (born 1977), American college basketball coach
- Billy Donovan (born 1965), American NBA coach and player
- Billy Doolan (born 1952), Australian Indigenous artist
- Billy Dooley (born 1969), Irish hurler
- Billy Dorrell (1872–1939), English professional footballer
- Billy Dougall (1895–1966), Scottish association footballer and manager
- Billy Douglas (disambiguation), several people
- Billy Dowling (born 2004), Australian AFL player
- Billy Down (1898–1977), English professional association footballer
- Billy Downer (born 1956), South African prosecutor
- Billy Drago (1945–2019), American television- and film actor
- Billy Drake (1917–2011), British fighter pilot and air ace
- Billy Draycott (1869–1943), English footballer
- Billy Drennan (born 2003), Irish hurler
- Billy Drumley (c. 1853–1951), Aboriginal Australian community leader
- Billy Drummond (born 1959), American jazz drummer
- Billy Duckworth (born 1959), Australian VFL player
- Billy Dudley (1931–1980), Nigerian political scientist
- Billy Duff (1938–2002), English professional footballer
- Billy Duffy (born 1961), English rock musician; guitarist in the band The Cult
- Billy Duffy (hurler) (1931–2005), Irish hurler
- Billy Duggan (1884–1934), Australian trade unionist
- Billy Dunlop (disambiguation), several people
- Billy Dunn (disambiguation), several people
- Billy Dwyer (1934–2020), Irish hurler
- Billy Eagle (1869–1908), Canadian soldier
- Billy Eames (born 1957), English professional footballer
- Billy Eardley (fl. 1871–1897), English footballer
- Billy Earheart (born 1954), American Hammond B3 organist and piano player; member of country rock group The Amazing Rhythm Aces
- Billy Earl McClelland (1950–2013), American session guitarist and songwriter
- Billy Earle (1867–1946), American MLB player
- Billy Easton (1904 – c. 1982), English footballer
- Billy Eckstine (1914–1993), American jazz and pop singer
- Billy Edd Wheeler (1932–2024), American songwriter, performer, writer, and visual artist
- Billy Eden (1905–1993), English footballer
- Billy Edson (1874–1965), American college football player, coach, lawyer, and politician
- Billy Edwards (disambiguation), several people
- Billy Egan (1886–1941), Australian VFL player
- Billy Egerton (1891–1934), English footballer
- Billy Eichner (born 1978), American comedian, actor, screenwriter, and television show host
- Billy Eidi (born 1955), Egyptian-born French classical pianist
- Billy Eisenberg (born 1937), American professional bridge and backgammon player
- Billy Eli (born 1962), American singer, songwriter, and autism activist
- Billy Elliot (disambiguation), several people
- Billy Ellis (1895–1939), English footballer
- Billy Elson (1865–1937), English footballer
- Billy Emory Maxwell (1942–2023), American track and field coach
- Billy Engelhart (born 1942), American racing driver
- Billy Engle (1889–1966), Austro-Hungarian Empire-born American film actor
- Billy Eppler (born 1975), American MLB executive
- Billy Etbauer (born 1963), American professional rodeo cowboy
- Billy Etheridge, American member of rock band ZZ Top
- Billy Evangelista (born 1980), American mixed martial artist
- Billy Evans (disambiguation), several people
- Billy Exley (1924–1997), English professional footballer
- Billy Faier (1930–2016), American banjo player and folk music evangelist
- Billy Fairhurst (1902–1979), English professional footballer
- Billy Falcon (born 1956), American musician, composer, and music producer
- Billy Fallin (1932–2025), American politician
- Billy Famous, Nigerian professional boxer
- Billy Fane (born 1947/1948), English actor and comedian
- Billy Farrell (footballer), Irish association footballer
- Billy Farwig (born 1957), Bolivian alpine skier
- Billy Fellowes (1910–1987), English footballer
- Billy Felton (1900–1977), English professional footballer
- Billy Fenton (1926–1973), English footballer
- Billy Ferguson (1938–1998), Northern Irish footballer
- Billy Fergusson (1897–1986), English footballer
- Billy Fessler (born 1995), American college football coach
- Billy Fewster (born 2003), English footballer
- Billy Ficca (born 1950), American drummer; member of rock groups Television and The Waitresses
- Billy Field (disambiguation), several people
- Billy Findlay (born 1970), Scottish footballer
- Billy Firehawk (fl. 2001–2006), American founder of NWA Shockwave
- Billy Fiske (1911–1940), American combat fighter pilot and Olympic bobsledder
- Billy Fitchett (1872–1952), New Zealand Anglican bishop
- Billy Fitchford (1896–1966), English footballer and cricketer
- Billy Fitzgerald (1888–1926), Canadian field lacrosse player
- Billy Fitzpatrick (born 1954), Irish sportsperson
- Billy Fleming (1871–1934), Scottish footballer
- Billy Fleming (landscape architect), American landscape designer, city planner, and climate activist
- Billy Flint (1890–1955), English footballer
- Billy Flynn (disambiguation), several people
- Billy Fogg (1903–1966), English professional footballer
- Billy Forbes (disambiguation), several people
- Billy Ford (singer) (1919 or 1925–1983), American pop vocal singer
- Billy Fordjour (born 1948), Ghanaian middle-distance runner
- Billy Forsberg (born 1988), Swedish speedway rider
- Billy Foster (1937–1967), Canadian racecar driver
- Billy Foulkes (1926–1979), Welsh international footballer
- Billy Fox (disambiguation), several people
- Billy Frame (1912–1992), Scottish footballer
- Billy Frampton (born 1996), Australian AFL player
- Billy Franey (1889–1940), American film actor
- Billy Frank (disambiguation), several people
- Billy Fraser (born 1945), Scottish professional footballer
- Billy Fraser (footballer, born 1868) (fl. 1868–1892), Scottish footballer
- Billy Frazer (born 2002), New Zealand racing driver
- Billy Friedberg (1915–1965), American producer and screenwriter
- Billy Frith (1912–1996), English footballer and manager
- Billy Frolick (born 1959), American screenwriter and film director
- Billy Fuccillo (1956–2021), American car dealer
- Billy Fulton (born 1977), New Zealand professional rugby union player
- Billy Furness (1909–1980), English professional footballer
- Billy Fury (1940–1983), English musician
- Billy Gabor (1922–2019), American NBA player
- Billy Gaffney (c. 1923–1927), American murder victim
- Billy Gallagher (disambiguation), several people
- Billy Gallier (1932–2011), English footballer and manager
- Billy Galligan (1937–2023), Irish hurler
- Billy Galvin (hurler), Irish hurler
- Billy Gambetta (1897–1957), Australian VFL player
- Billy Gambrell (born 1941), American NFL player
- Billy Garcia, American heavy metal musician; constant on Survivor
- Billy Gardell (born 1969), American actor and stand-up comedian
- Billy Gardner (1927–2024), American MLB player, coach, and manager
- Billy Garland (1918–1960), American blues guitarist, singer, and songwriter
- Billy Garland (activist) (born 1949), American political activist; father of rapper Tupac Shakur
- Billy Garraty (1878–1931), English footballer
- Billy Garrett (1933–1999), American racecar driver
- Billy Garrett Jr. (born 1994), American NBA player
- Billy Garrett (politician) (born 1956), American politician and lawyer
- Billy Garton (born 1965), English football coach and professional player
- Billy Gasparino, American MLB executive
- Billy Gaughan (1892–1956), English professional footballer
- Billy Gault (born 1936), American NFL player
- Billy Gayles (1931–1993), American rhythm & blues drummer and vocalist
- Billy Gazonas (born 1956), American NASL and MISL player
- Billy Geen (1891–1915), Welsh rugby union player
- Billy Geer (fl. 1874–1928), American MLB player
- Billy Gene Pemelton (born 1941) American pole vaulter
- Billy Gent (1879–1957), Australian VFL player
- Billy George (disambiguation), several people
- Billy Gernon (born 1966/1967), American college baseball coach
- Billy Gerrish (1884–1916), English professional footballer
- Billy Gibbons (born 1949), American rock musician; member of rock band ZZ Top
- Billy Gibson (disambiguation), several people
- Billy Gierhart, American television director and steadicam operator
- Billy Gilbert (disambiguation), several people
- Billy Giles (1957–1998), Northern Irish politician and convicted murderer
- Billy Gill (1876–1930), Australian VFL player
- Billy Gillespie (1891–1981), Irish footballer
- Billy Gillies (born 1989/1990), Northern Irish disc jockey and trance music producer
- Billy Gilligan (1876–1914), Scottish footballer
- Billy Gilliland (born 1957), Scottish badminton player
- Billy Gillispie (born 1959), American college basketball coach
- Billy Gilman (born 1988), American country singer
- Billy Gilmore (?–1978), American musician
- Billy Gilmour (born 2001), Scottish professional footballer
- Billy Gilmour (ice hockey) (1885–1959), Canadian NHL player
- Billy Ging (1872–1950), American MLB pitcher
- Billy Gladdon (1880–1961), English cricketer and footballer
- Billy Glading, American MLL player
- Billy Gladstone (1893–1961), Romanian-born American drummer, percussionist, inventor, and drum builder- and teacher
- Billy Glason (1893–1985), American vaudeville entertainer, songwriter, and comedian
- Billy Glaze (1943–2015), American convicted serial killer
- Billy Gleason (1894–1957), American MLB player
- Billy Glenn (1877–1953), New Zealand rugby union player
- Billy Glide (1970–2014), American pornographic actor
- Billy Glover (1896–1962), English footballer
- Billy Godleman (born 1989), English cricketer
- Billy Godwin (born 1964), American college baseball coach and pitcher
- Billy Goeckel (1871–1922), American MLB player
- Billy Goelz (1918–2002), American professional wrestler, booker, and trainer
- Billy Goffin (1920–1987), English professional footballer
- Billy Goh, Singaporean politician
- Billy Gohl (1873–1927), German-American murderer and suspected serial killer
- Billy Goldberg (born 1966), American emergency medicine physician and assistant professor- and director
- Billy Golden (1858–1926), American comedian, singer, actor, and vaudevillian
- Billy Goldenberg (1936–2020), American composer and songwriter
- Billy Golfus, American disability rights activist
- Billy Gonsalves (1908–1977), American soccer player
- Billy Gonzales (born 1971), American football coach and player
- Billy Good (1812–1848), English professional cricketer
- Billy Gooden (1923–1998), Canadian NHL player
- Billy Goodhew (1828–1897), English professional cricketer
- Billy Goodman (1926–1984), American MLB player
- Billy Goodwin (1892–1951), English footballer
- Billy Goodwin (musician), American member of contemporary Christian music group NewSong
- Billy Gordon (1972/1973–2022), Indigenous Australian politician
- Billy Gore (1919–2010), Welsh rugby union- and professional rugby league footballer
- Billy Gould (born 1963), American musician and producer
- Billy Gould (comedian) (1869–1950), American comedian and minstrel show performer
- Billy Goundry (1934–2012), English professional footballer
- Billy Gowers (born 1996), Australian VFL player and AFL player
- Billy Grabarkewitz (born 1946), American MLB player
- Billy Grace (1876–1938), Australian VFL player
- Billy Graham (disambiguation), several people
- Billy Grammer (1925–2011), American country singer and guitar player
- Billy Granville (born 1974), American NFL player
- Billy Grassam (1878–1943), Scottish footballer
- Billy Graulich (1868–1948), American MLB player
- Billy Gray (disambiguation), several people
- Billy Graziadei (born 1969), American musician; member of hardcore band Biohazard
- Billy Green (disambiguation), several people
- Billy Greene (born 1990), Canadian football player
- Billy Greenhorn (1937–1995), American poet
- Billy Greer (born 1952), American musician; past member of rock band Kansas
- Billy Greer (footballer) (1872–1937), English footballer
- Billy Greulich (born 1991), English footballer
- Billy Griffin (born 1950), American singer and songwriter
- Billy Griffith (1914–1993), English cricketer and cricket administrator
- Billy Griffith (footballer) (1880–1949), Australian VFL player
- Billy Griffiths (disambiguation), several people
- Billy Griggs (born 1968), American professional BMX racer
- Billy Griggs (American football) (born 1962), American NFL player
- Billy Grimes (1927–2005), American NFL player
- Billy Grimshaw (1892–1968), English footballer
- Billy Guest (1914–1994), English professional footballer
- Billy Gumbert (1865–1946), American MLB pitcher
- Billy Gunn (born 1963), American professional wrestler and coach
- Billy Gussak (1920–1994), American jazz- and recording session drummer
- Billy Gustafsson (1948–2018), Swedish politician
- Billy Guy (1936–2002), American singer; member of rhythm and blues/rock and roll vocal group The Coasters
- Billy Guyton (1990–2023), New Zealand rugby union player
- Billy Haddleton (1926–1990), Canadian football player
- Billy Hagan (disambiguation), several people
- Billy Hague (1885–1969), Canadian ice hockey player
- Billy Hahn (1953–2023), American basketball coach
- Billy Hails (1935–2017), English professional footballer
- Billy Hainey (born 1939), Scottish professional footballer
- Billy Hales (1920–1984), English footballer
- Billy Hall (disambiguation), several people
- Billy Halliday (1906–1989), Scottish professional association footballer
- Billy Halligan (1886–1950), Irish professional association footballer
- Billy Halop (1920–1976), American actor
- Billy Halsall (1897–1968), English footballer
- Billy Hamill (born 1970), American international motorcycle speedway rider
- Billy Hamilton (disambiguation), several people
- Billy Hammond (1887–1919), Australian VFL player
- Billy Hampson (1884–1966), English footballer and manager
- Billy Hancock (1946–2018), American singer, guitarist, bassist, and multi-instrumental recording artist
- Billy Hanna (c. 1929–1975), Northern Irish soldier
- Billy Hanning Jr. (born 1985), American Paralympic sledge hockey player
- Billy Hardee (1954–2011), American NFL-, CFL-, and USFL player
- Billy Hardin (born 1942), American track and field athlete
- Billy Hardwick (1941–2013), American ten-pin bowler
- Billy Hardy (disambiguation), several people
- Billy Harker (1910–1973), English professional association footballer
- Billy Harmon (born 1994), New Zealand rugby union player
- Billy Harper (born 1943), American jazz saxophonist
- Billy Harper (footballer, born 1877) (1877–1947), English footballer
- Billy Harper (footballer, born 1897) (1897–1982), English professional footballer
- Billy Harrell (1928–2014), American MLB player
- Billy Harris (disambiguation), several people
- Billy Harrison (disambiguation), several people
- Billy Hart (born 1940), American jazz drummer and educator
- Billy Hart (baseball) (1866–1944), American MLB pitcher
- Billy Hartill (1905–1980), English professional footballer
- Billy Hartman (born 1957), Scottish actor
- Billy Hartung (disambiguation), several people
- Billy Harvey (footballer) (1892–1917), Australian VFL player
- Billy Harvey (politician) (1932–2006), American politician
- Billy Hassett (1921–1992), American NBL and NBA player
- Billy Hatcher (born 1960), American MLB player and coach
- Billy Haughton (1923–1986), American harness driver and trainer
- Billy Hawks (born 1941), American R&B and jazz organist
- Billy Haydock (born 1936), English footballer
- Billy Hayes (disambiguation), several people
- Billy Haywood (1899–1977), English footballer
- Billy Heames (1869–1939), English footballer
- Billy Heath (1869–after 1895), English footballer
- Billy Hector (born 1956), American blues guitarist and singer-songwriter
- Billy Hedderman, Irish Army officer
- Billy Henderson (disambiguation), several people
- Billy Hendry (1869–1901), Scottish footballer
- Billy Hennebery (1888–1965), Irish hurler
- Billy Hennessy (born 1997), Irish hurler
- Billy Henry (1884–after 1960), Scottish professional footballer
- Billy Herbert (1888–1928), English footballer
- Billy Herman (1909–1992), American MLB player and manager
- Billy Herrington (1969–2018), American model and pornographic film actor
- Billy Hewes (born 1961), American politician
- Billy Hiatt (born 1947), English boxer
- Billy Hibbert (1884–1949), English professional footballer
- Billy Hick (1903–1972), English footballer
- Billy Hickling, English footballer
- Billy Hickman (born 1952), American politician
- Billy Hickman (American football) (born c. 1983), American college football coach
- Billy Hicks (1927–2016), American moving target shooter
- Billy Higgins (disambiguation), several people
- Billy Hilfiger, American past member of rock band Brain Surgeons
- Billy Hill (disambiguation), several people
- Billy Hillenbrand (1922–1994), American AAFC player
- Billy Hind (1885–1963), English professional footballer
- Billy Hinsche (1951–2021), American musician
- Billy Hinton (1882–1953), Irish international rugby union player
- Billy Hitchcock (1916–2006), American MLB player, coach, manager, and scout
- Billy Hix (1929–1974), American NFL player
- Billy Hodgson (1935–2022), Scottish footballer
- Billy Hoeft (1932–2010), American MLB pitcher
- Billy Hoffman (singer), American country singer and songwriter
- Billy Hogan (1933–1994), American singer and songwriter
- Billy Hogg (1879–1937), English footballer
- Billy Hogg (Scottish footballer), Scottish association footballer
- Billy Holder (?–1941), English rugby union- and professional rugby league footballer
- Billy Holding (1907–1986), English professional rugby league footballer
- Billy Hole (1897–1983), Welsh footballer
- Billy Hole (speedway rider) (1919–1986), British motorcycle speedway rider
- Billy Holland (born 1985), Irish rugby union player
- Billy Holland (baseball) (fl. 1874–1909), American Negro leagues player
- Billy Holm (1912–1977), American MLB player
- Billy Holmes (disambiguation), several people
- Billy Holowesko (born 1965), Bahamian sailor
- Billy Hong (1904–1983), Australian professional rugby league footballer
- Billy Hood (1873–1947), English footballer
- Billy Hooper (1931–1981), Canadian football player
- Billy Hopkins, American partner of film producer, director, and screenwriter Lee Daniels
- Billy Horn (born 1938), Scottish professional footballer
- Billy Horne (1916–1969), American Negro league player
- Billy Horner (born 1942), English footballer and manager
- Billy Horschel (born 1986), American professional golfer
- Billy Hough (disambiguation), several people
- Billy Houghton (born 1939), English professional footballer
- Billy Houliston (1921–1999), Scottish footballer
- Billy House (1889–1961), American actor, vaudevillian, and Broadway performer
- Billy Howard (comedian), English comedian and impressionist
- Billy Howard (gridiron football) (1950–2005), American NFL- and CFL player
- Billy Howat, Scottish curler
- Billy Howden (1879–1937), Scottish footballer
- Billy Howells (born 1943), English professional footballer
- Billy Howerdel (born 1970), American musician; member of rock band A Perfect Circle
- Billy Howle (born 1989), English actor
- Billy Howton (born 1930), American NFL player
- Billy Hudson (1938–2022), American politician
- Billy Hufsey (born 1958), American actor and singer
- Billy Hughes (disambiguation), several people
- Billy Hulen (1870–1947), American MLB player
- Billy Hull (1912–?), Northern Irish politician
- Billy Hullin (1942–2012), Welsh international rugby union player
- Billy Hume (1935–1990), Scottish professional footballer
- Billy Humphreys (1884–?), English footballer
- Billy Humphries (born 1936), Northern Irish footballer
- Billy Hunt (footballer) (born 1934), English professional footballer
- Billy Hunter (disambiguation), several people
- Billy Hurley (disambiguation), several people
- Billy Hutchinson (disambiguation), several people
- Billy Ibadulla (1935–2024), Pakistani-New Zealander cricketer, cricket coach, and umpire
- Billy Idol (born 1955), English punk singer, songwriter, musician, and actor
- Billy Incardona (born 1943), American professional pool player
- Billy Ingham (1952–2009), English professional footballer
- Billy Ingram (1865–1947), English footballer
- Billy Ions (born 1994), English professional footballer
- Billy Ireland (1880–1935), American cartoonist
- Billy Irwin (disambiguation), several people
- Billy Iuso (born 1969), American guitarist, singer, and songwriter
- Billy Ivison (1920–2000), English professional association football- and rugby league footballer
- Billy J. Creech (born 1943), American politician
- Billy J. Kramer (born 1943), English pop singer
- Billy Jack (disambiguation), several people
- Billy Jackson (disambiguation), several people
- Billy Jacobsen, American 2017 Pickleball Hall of Fame inductee
- Billy Jacobson (born 1980), South African jockey
- Billy Jacques (1871–1957), English rugby union and professional rugby league footballer
- Billy Jaffe (born 1969), American on-air ice hockey analyst
- Billy Jagar (1870–1930), Australian Aboriginal elder
- Billy James (disambiguation), several people
- Billy Jamieson (1954–2011), Canadian treasure- and antique dealer and reality TV star
- Billy Janniro (born 1980), American motorcycle speedway rider
- Billy Jarman (1887–1916), English professional rugby league footballer
- Billy Jay Stein (born 1970), American pianist, keyboardist, composer, music director, record producer, electronic music designer, and mixing engineer
- Billy-Jean Ale (born 1991), New Zealand rugby league footballer
- Billy Jeavons (1912–1992), English professional footballer
- Billy Jefferson (1918–1974), American NFL player and coach
- Billy Jeffrey (born 1956), Scottish footballer
- Billy Jenkins (disambiguation), several people
- Billy Jennings (born 1952), English footballer
- Billy Jennings (Welsh footballer) (1893–1968), Welsh footballer
- Billy Jensen, American investigative journalist, author, producer, and podcaster
- Billy Jernigan (1923–1997), American wrestler
- Billy Jervis (born 1942), English professional footballer
- Billy Joe (disambiguation), several people
- Billy Joel (born 1949), American singer, songwriter, and pianist
- Billy Johnson (disambiguation), several people
- Billy Johnston (disambiguation), several people
- Billy Johnstone (born 1959), Australian rugby league footballer
- Billy Joiner (1938–2019), American professional boxer
- Billy Jo Lara, American defendant in the United States v. Lara case
- Billy Jo Robidoux (born 1964), American MLB player
- Billy Jonas, American singer-songwriter, percussionist, multi-instrumentalist, and recording artist
- Billy Jones (disambiguation), several people
- Billy Jordan, Irish association footballer
- Billy Joy (1863–1947), English footballer
- Billy Joya, Honduran military officer
- Billy Joyce (1949–2025), Irish Gaelic football player and manager
- Billy Jurges (1908–1997), American MLB player, manager, coach, and scout
- Billy K. Solomon (born 1944), American Quartermaster officer
- Billy Kahora, Kenyan writer and editor
- Billy Kametz (1987–2022), American voice- and stage actor
- Billy Kan (born 1951/1952), Hong Kong billionaire and businessman
- Billy Kann (born 1962), American professional stock car racing driver
- Billy Karren, American musician; past member of punk rock band Bikini Kill
- Billy Kaunda, Malawian musician and politician
- Billy Kay (disambiguation), several people
- Billy Keane, Irish hurler
- Billy Kearns (1923–1992), American actor
- Billy Keast (born 1996), English professional rugby union player
- Billy Kee (born 1990), English-born Northern Irish footballer
- Billy Keith (born 1934), American politician
- Billy Kelleher (born 1968), Irish politician
- Billy Keller (born 1947), American NBA player
- Billy Kellock (1889–1958), English footballer and manager
- Billy Kellock (footballer, born 1954) (1954–2024), Scottish footballer
- Billy Kelly (disambiguation), several people
- Billy Kelsey (1881–1968), American MLB player
- Billy Kenneally (1925–2009), Irish politician
- Billy Kennedy (disambiguation), several people
- Billy Kenny (disambiguation), several people
- Billy Kenoi (1968–2021), American politician
- Billy Keraf (born 1997), Indonesian professional footballer
- Billy Kerr (1945–2012), Irish cyclist
- Billy Kersands (c. 1842–1915), African-American comedian and dancer
- Billy Kershaw, English professional rugby league footballer
- Billy Ketkeophomphone (born 1990), French-born Laos professional footballer
- Billy Kettle (1898–1980), English professional footballer
- Billy Key (1895–1986), British Indian Army officer
- Billy Keys (born 1977), American SPB and NBA player and coach
- Billy Kibblewhite (1909–1951), Canadian long-distance runner
- Billy Kidd (born 1943), American ski racer
- Billy Kidd (American football) (born 1959), American NFL player
- Billy Kidd (footballer) (1908–1978), English footballer
- Billy Kidman (born 1974), American professional wrestler
- Billy Kiernan (1925–2006), English footballer
- Billy Kilmer (born 1939), American NFL player
- Billy Kilson (born 1962), American jazz drummer
- Billy Kim (born 1934), South Korean Christian evangelist and humanitarian
- Billy Kimball (born 1959), American writer and producer
- Billy Kinard (1933–2018), American NFL- and AFL player and coach
- Billy King (disambiguation), several people
- Billy Kingdon (1907–1977), English footballer
- Billy Kinloch (1874–1931), American MLB player
- Billy Kinsley (born 1946), English musician; member of Liverpool Express and The Merseybeats
- Billy Kirk (1909–1997), English professional rugby league footballer
- Billy Kirkman (born 2004), English professional footballer
- Billy Kirkwood (born 1958), Scottish coach and footballer
- Billy Kirsch, American songwriter and consultant
- Billy Kirsopp (1892–1978), English professional footballer
- Billy Kirton (1895–1970), English footballer
- Billy Kitchin (1882–1960), English professional rugby league footballer
- Billy Klapper (1937–2024), American spur and bit maker
- Billy Klaus (1928–2006), American MLB player
- Billy Klippert, Canadian rock singer-songwriter
- Billy Klusman (1865–1907), American MLB player
- Billy Klüver (1927–2004), American electrical engineer
- Billy Knight (born 1952), American ABA and NBA player and executive
- Billy Knight (basketball, born 1979) (1979–2018), American professional basketball player
- Billy Knight (criminal) (1943–1978), Canadian criminal
- Billy Knight (tennis) (born 1935), English tennis player
- Billy Knipper (1882–1968), American racing driver
- Billy Knott (born 1992), English footballer
- Billy Koch (born 1974), American MLB relief pitcher
- Billy Koen (born 1938), American professor emeritus of mechanical engineering
- Billy Konchellah (born 1961), Kenyan Olympic runner
- Billy Konstantinidis (born 1986), Greek-Australian footballer
- Billy Kopsch, French-born Australian professional wrestler
- Billy Koumetio (born 2002), French professional footballer
- Billy Kountz (1867–1899), American businessman, football player, manager, and humorist
- Billy Kratzert (born 1952), American professional golfer and sportscaster
- Billy Kristian, New Zealand past member of rock group Ray Columbus & the Invaders
- Billy Kyle (1914–1966), American jazz pianist
- Billy Lacken (1888–1916), Canadian ECAHL player
- Billy Laing (born 1951), Scottish professional footballer
- Billy Lambe (1877–1951), English footballer
- Billy La Min Aye (born 1995), Burmese singer-songwriter
- Billy Lamont (1936–2021), Scottish football player and manager
- Billy Lamont (speedway rider) (1908–1988), Australian motorcycle speedway rider
- Billy Lane (born 1970), American builder of custom motorcycles
- Billy Lane (angler) (1922–1980), English angler and author
- Billy Lane (footballer) (1904–1985), English footballer
- Billy Lane Lauffer (1945–1966), United States Army soldier during the Vietnam War
- Billy Lang (1883–1944), American lyricist and music publisher
- Billy Lange (born 1972), American college basketball coach
- Billy Langham (1876–1927), English footballer
- Billy Lansdowne (born 1959), English professional footballer
- Billy Latsko (born 1984), American NFL player
- Billy Lau (born 1954), Hong Kong film actor
- Billy Lauder (1874–1933), American MLB player and coach
- Billy Laughlin (1932–1948), American child actor
- Billy Laval (1885–1957), American minor league baseball player, baseball manager, and college baseball, football, and basketball coach
- Billy Law (1882–?), English professional footballer
- Billy Lawless (1950–2024), Irish politician and businessman
- Billy Lawrence, American R&B/soul singer-songwriter, record producer, and arranger
- Billy Layton (1882–1946), English footballer
- Billy Leahy (1911–1978), Australian VFL player
- Billy Lee (disambiguation), several people
- Billy Leech (1875–1934), English footballer
- Billy Leeds (1880–1955), Australian VFL player
- Billy Leese (born 1961), English footballer
- Billy Lefear (born 1950), American NFL player
- Billy Legg (1948–2022), English professional footballer
- Billy Leighton (1914–1981), English footballer
- Billy Leisaw (1875–1941), American racing driver
- Billy Leitch (1895–1963), Irish footballer
- Billy Lenoir (1942–2007), American tennis player
- Billy Leonard (born 1955), Irish politician
- Billy Leslie (born 1987), American professional racing driver
- Billy Levy, American entrepreneur
- Billy Lewis (disambiguation), several people
- Billy Liar (band), Scottish acoustic punk/folk band and solo singer
- Billy Libbis (1903–1986), Australian VFL player
- Billy Liddell (1922–2001), Scottish footballer
- Billy Light (1913–1979), English footballer
- Billy Linacre (1924–2010), English professional footballer
- Billy Lindsay (1872–1933), English professional footballer
- Billy Linward (1877–1940), English footballer
- Billy Little (born 1940), Scottish professional footballer and manager
- Billy Little (1900s rugby league) (c. 1880–1965), English professional rugby league footballer
- Billy Little (rugby league, born 1911) (1911–2004), English professional rugby league footballer
- Billy Livsey, American songwriter, keyboardist, and producer
- Billy Lobjoit (born 1993), English professional footballer
- Billy Loes (1929–2010), American MLB pitcher
- Billy Lomas (1885–1976), English footballer
- Billy Long (born 1955), American politician, realtor, and auctioneer
- Billy Longden (1866–1924), English footballer
- Billy Longer (born 1993), Australian AFL player
- Billy Lothridge (1942–1996), American NFL player
- Billy Lott (1934–1995), American NFL and AFL player
- Billy Loughnane (born 2006), Irish jockey
- Billy Lucas (1918–1998), Welsh international footballer
- Billy Luke (1890–1992), English professional footballer
- Billy Lumley (born 1989), English footballer
- Billy Lunn (disambiguation), several people
- Billy Lush (born 1981), American actor
- Billy Lush (baseball) (1873–1951), American MLB player and college athletics coach and administrator
- Billy Lustig (?–1913), American gang leader and labor racketeer
- Billy Luther, Native American independent film writer, producer, and director
- Billy Lyall (1953–1989), Scottish musician
- Billy Lyell (born 1984), American professional boxer
- Billy Lynch (disambiguation), several people
- Billy Lynn (1947–2014), English professional footballer
- Billy Lyon (born 1973), American NFL player
- Billy Lyon (footballer) (1878–1915), Scottish footballer
- Billy Lyons (?–1895), American murder victim
- Billy M. Minter (1926–2005), American Air Force general
- Billy MacDermott (born 1981), Argentine cricketer
- Billy MacDonald (disambiguation), several people
- Billy MacKay (born 1960), Scottish professional footballer
- Billy MacKay (cricketer) (1891–1962), English cricketer
- Billy Mackel (1912–1986), American jazz guitarist
- Billy MacKenzie (1957–1997), Scottish singer and songwriter
- Billy MacKenzie (motorcyclist) (born 1984), Scottish professional motocross racer
- Billy Mackesy (1880–1956), Irish dual player of Gaelic games, hurler, and footballer
- Billy MacKinnon (1852–1942), Scottish footballer
- Billy MacLellan (born 1974), Canadian actor
- Billy MacLeod (1942–2018), American MLB relief pitcher
- Billy Macqueen, English founder of television company Darrall Macqueen
- Billy Madden (1852–1918), American boxer, pugilistic trainer, manager, playwright, author, journalist, and producer of sporting events
- Billy Madin, English footballer
- Billy Magnussen (born 1985), American actor
- Billy Magoulias (born 1997), Australian-born Greek international rugby league footballer
- Billy Mahan (1930–2002), American film actor
- Billy Maharg (1881–1953), American professional boxer and MLB player
- Billy Maher, English radio presenter and musician
- Billy Mail, Scottish actor
- Billy Mainwaring (1941–2019), Welsh international rugby union player
- Billy Majors (1938–1965), American AFL player
- Billy Maloney (1878–1960), American MLB player
- Billy Malpass (1867–1939), English footballer
- Billy Mamaril (born 1980), Filipino-American PBA player
- Billy Mandindi (1967–2005), South African activist-artist
- Billy Mann (born 1968), American record producer and songwriter
- Billy Mann (rugby union) (1908–1965), Australian international rugby union player
- Billy Mansfield (born 1956), American serial killer, child molester, and sex offender
- Billy Manuel (born 1969), English professional footballer
- Billy March (1925–1974), English footballer
- Billy Marek (born c. 1954), American college football player
- Billy Marsden (1901–1983), English international footballer
- Billy Marsh (1917–1995), British theatrical agent
- Billy Marshall (disambiguation), several people
- Billy Martin (disambiguation), several people
- Billy Martindale (born 1938), American professional golfer
- Billy Masetlha (1954–2023), South African intelligence officer
- Billy Mason (1889–1941), American vaudeville performer and film comedian
- Billy Masters (disambiguation), several people
- Billy Mataitai (born 1983), French Polynesian footballer
- Billy Matthews (disambiguation), several people
- Billy Mauch (1921–2006), American actor
- Billy Mavreas (born 1968), Canadian cartoonist and artist
- Billy Maxted (1917–2001), American jazz pianist
- Billy Maxwell (1929–2021), American professional golfer
- Billy May (1916–2004), American composer, arranger, and trumpeter
- Billy Mayerl (1902–1959), English pianist and composer
- Billy Mayfair (born 1966), American professional golfer
- Billy May (footballer) (1865–1936), English footballer
- Billy Mays (disambiguation), several people
- Billy McAdams (1934–2002), Northern Irish footballer
- Billy McAllister (1907–1984), Australian professional boxer
- Billy McAllister (footballer) (c. 1900–after 1932), Scottish professional footballer
- Billy McAvoy (born c. 1949), Northern Irish footballer
- Billy McBean (1889–1976), Australian VFL player
- Billy McBryde (born 1996), Welsh rugby union player
- Billy McCaffrey (born 1971), American NBL player and coach
- Billy McCandless (1893–1955), Irish international footballer and manager
- Billy McCann (1919–2002), American college basketball coach
- Billy McCarter (1888–1941), Australian VFL player
- Billy McCarthy, Irish hurler
- Billy McCarthy (boxer) (1854–1931), English-born Australian professional boxer
- Billy McCartney (born 1947), Scottish footballer
- Billy McCaughey (c. 1950–2006), Northern Irish politician and convicted murderer
- Billy McClain (1866–1950), African-American acrobat, comedian, and actor
- Billy McClure (born 1958), English-born New Zealand footballer
- Billy McColl (disambiguation), several people
- Billy McComb (1922–2006), Northern Irish-born American magician and comedian
- Billy McCombe (1949–2025), Irish international rugby union player
- Billy McConnachie (born 1990), Scotland international rugby league footballer
- Billy McConnell (disambiguation), several people
- Billy McCool (1944–2014), American MLB pitcher
- Billy McCormack (Louisiana pastor) (1928–2012), American Southern Baptist clergyman
- Billy McCrary (1946–1979), American professional wrestler
- Billy McCray (1927–2012), American politician
- Billy McCulloch (1922–1961), Scottish footballer
- Billy McCullough (born 1935), Northern Irish footballer
- Billy McDevitt (1898–1966), Northern Irish footballer
- Billy McEwan (disambiguation), several people
- Billy McFarland (born 1991), American businessman, entrepreneur, and financial criminal
- Billy McFarland (loyalist), Northern Irish politician
- Billy McGee (footballer) (1878–1939), Australian VFL player
- Billy McGhie (disambiguation), several people
- Billy McGimsie (1880–1968), Canadian ice hockey player
- Billy McGinley (born 1954), Scottish professional footballer
- Billy McGinty (disambiguation), several people
- Billy McGlen (1921–1999), English professional footballer
- Billy McGlory (1850s–1920s), American saloon keeper and underworld figure
- Billy McGregor (1876–1919), Australian VFL player
- Billy McGuinness, Irish member of rock band Aslan
- Billy McIntosh (1919–1990), Scottish footballer
- Billy McIsaac (born 1949), Scottish musician
- Billy Mckay (born 1988), English-born Northern Irish professional footballer
- Billy McKeag (born 1945), Northern Irish professional footballer
- Billy McKee (1921–2019), Irish politician
- Billy McKinlay (born 1969), Scottish football manager and professional footballer
- Billy McKinlay (footballer) (1904–1976), Scottish professional footballer
- Billy McKinney (disambiguation), several people
- Billy McLaren (born 1948), Scottish association footballer and manager
- Billy McLauchlan (1950–1972), Scottish footballer
- Billy McLaughlin, American new age acoustic guitarist, composer, and producer
- Billy McLean (disambiguation), several people
- Billy McLeod, (1887–1959), English footballer
- Billy McMahon (athlete) (1910–1991), American long-distance runner
- Billy McMillan (disambiguation), several people
- Billy McMullen (born 1980), American NFL player
- Billy McNamara, Australian professional rugby league footballer
- Billy McNeill (1940–2019), Scottish footballer and manager
- Billy McNeill (ice hockey) (1936–2007), Canadian NHL player
- Billy McNulty (born 1949), Scottish footballer
- Billy McOwen (1871–1950), English footballer
- Billy McPate (born 1951), Scottish cricketer and umpire
- Billy McPhail (1928–2003), Scottish footballer
- Billy McQuiston, Northern Irish politician and criminal
- Billy McShepard (born 1987), American professional basketball player
- Billy Mead (born 1999), English cricketer
- Billy Meehan, American politician
- Billy Meeske (1891–1970), Australian professional wrestler
- Billy Mehmet (born 1984), English professional footballer
- Billy Meier (born 1937), Swiss author and founder of a UFO religion
- Billy Mellors (born 1975), Scottish international indoor- and lawn bowler
- Billy Melvin (born 1977), Scottish footballer
- Billy Merasty (born 1960), Aboriginal Canadian actor and writer
- Billy Mercer (disambiguation), several people
- Billy Meredith (1874–1958), Welsh professional footballer
- Billy Merrell (born 1982), American author and poet
- Billy Merson (1879–1947), English music hall performer, comedian, and songwriter
- Billy Meyer (1893–1957), American MLB player and manager
- Billy Middleton (1893–?), English professional footballer
- Billy Midwinter (1851–1890), English-born Australian cricketer
- Billy Milano (born 1964), American heavy metal- and hardcore punk musician
- William Millar (disambiguation), several people
- Billy Millard (born 1970), Australian rugby union coach and current rugby director
- Billy Miller (disambiguation), several people
- William Milligan (disambiguation), several people
- Billy Mills (disambiguation), several people
- Billy Milne (1895–1975), Scottish footballer
- Billy Milne (footballer, born 1873) (1873–1951), English footballer and cricketer
- Billy Milner (born 1972), American NFL player
- Billy Milton (1905–1989), English stage, film, and television actor
- Billy Mims, American basketball coach
- Billy Minardi (died 2001), American killed in the 9/11 attacks
- Billy Minick (born 1939), American professional rodeo cowboy and stock contractor
- Billy Minor (born 1970), American NFL and AFL player
- Billy Minsky (1887–1932), American burlesque presenter
- Billy Minter (1888–1940), English footballer, trainer, manager, and assistant secretary
- Billy Miske (1894–1924), American professional boxer
- Billy Mitchell (disambiguation), several people
- Billy Mize (1929–2017), American country singer-songwriter, steel guitarist, band leader, and TV show host
- Billy Modise (1930–2018), South African activist and diplomat
- Billy Moeller (born 1949), Australian boxer
- Billy Moffatt (1897–1952), Scottish professional footballer
- Billy Mohl (born 1984), American college baseball coach
- Billy Mohler, American producer, songwriter, and multi-instrumentalist
- Billy Moloughney (born 1932), Irish hurler
- Billy Molyneux (born 1944), English footballer
- Billy Monagle (1876–1941), Australian VFL player
- Billy Monger (born 1999), English racing driver
- Billy Monk (?–1982), South African man known for his photographs of a Cape Town nightclub
- Billy Montana (born 1959), American country singer-songwriter
- Billy Montgomery (1937–2025), American educator and politician
- Billy Moon (1868–1943), English association footballer
- Billy Moore (disambiguation), several people
- Billy Moores (born 1948), Canadian ice hockey executive, scout, and NHL assistant coach
- Billy Moran (1933–2021), American MLB player
- Billy More (1965–2005), Italian drag queen and music artist
- Billy Morgan (disambiguation), several people
- Billy Morin (born 1987/1988), Canadian Cree First Nations leader
- Billy Morris (disambiguation), several people
- Billy Morrison (disambiguation), several people
- Billy Morrissette, American Billy Morrissette; husband of Maura Tierney from 1993 to 2006
- Billy Mosforth (1858–1929), English footballer
- Billy Moss, alternate name of W. Stanley Moss (1921–1965), Japanese-born British soldier, writer, and traveller
- Billy Mothle (born 1956), South African judge
- Billy Mould (1919–1999), English footballer
- Billy Moxham (1886–1959), Australian VFL player
- Billy Muffett (1930–2008), American MLB pitcher and coach
- Billy Muir (born 1934), Scottish footballer
- Billy Mullen (1896–1971), American MLB player
- Billy Mundi (1942–2014), American drummer
- Billy Munn (1911–2000), Scottish jazz pianist and arranger
- Billy Munro (disambiguation), several people
- Billy Murcia (1951–1972), American drummer
- Billy Murdoch (1854–1911), Australian cricketer
- Billy Murdoch (footballer) (born 1949), Scottish professional footballer
- Billy Mure (1915–2013), American guitarist and songwriter
- Billy Murphy (disambiguation), several people
- Billy Murray (disambiguation), several people
- Billy Mutale (born 1993), Zambian footballer
- Billy Mwaningange (born 1945), Namibian politician
- Billy Mwanza (born 1983), Zambian footballer
- Billy Myers (1910–1995), American MLB player
- Billy Myers (Canadian football) (1923–2019), Canadian CFL player
- Billy Myers (Gaelic footballer) (1916–1963), Irish sportsperson
- Billy Myles (1924–2005), American R&B singer and songwriter
- Billy Nair (1929–2008), South African politician, trade unionist, and anti-apartheid activist
- Billy Name (1940–2016), American photographer, filmmaker, lighting designer, and archivist
- Billy Napier (born 1979), American football coach
- Billy Nash (1865–1929), American MLB player
- Billy Nasty, British techno- and electro DJ and artist
- Billy Naylor (1916–2011), American child actor
- Billy Neale (1933–2001), English footballer
- Billy Neale (cricketer) (1904–1955), English professional cricketer
- Billy Nealon (born 1960), American professional tennis player
- Billy Neighbors (1940–2012), American AFL player
- Billy Neil (disambiguation), several people
- Billy Neill (1929–1997), Northern Irish footballer
- Billy Nelson (disambiguation), several people
- Billy Nesbitt (1891–1972), English professional footballer
- Billy Nevett (1906–1992), English flat racing jockey
- Billy Neville (footballer) (1935–2018), Irish footballer
- Billy Newham (1860–1944), English cricketer
- Billy Newing (1892–1970), Australian VFL player
- Billy Newman (1946–2022), Irish footballer
- Billy Newnes (born 1959), English jockey
- Billy Newsome (born 1948), American NFL player
- Billy Newton (1893–1973), English professional footballer
- Billy Newton-Davis (born 1951), American-Canadian R&B-, jazz-, and gospel singer and songwriter
- Billy Ng (born 1940), Malaysian badminton player
- Billy Ngawini (born 1981), Italian international rugby union footballer
- Billy Nicholas, American Negro league baseball pitcher
- Billy Nicholls (born 1949), English singer, songwriter, composer, record producer, and musical director
- Billy Nichols (born 1940), American guitarist and soul songwriter
- Billy Nicholson (disambiguation), several people
- Billy Nicks (1905–1999), American college football player and coach
- Billy Nicolle, New Zealand association footballer
- Billy Noke (born 1963), Australian professional rugby league footballer
- Billy Nolan (hurler) (born 1998), Irish hurler
- Billy Nolen, American government official
- Billy Nomates (born 1990), English musician and singer-songwriter
- Billy Nordström (born 1995), Swedish footballer
- Billy Nungesser (born 1959), American politician
- Billy Nunn (disambiguation), several people
- Billy Nuttall (1920–1963), English footballer
- Billy Oatman (1965–2023), American ten-pin bowler
- Billy Ocasio, Puerto Rican-American politician
- Billy Ocean (born 1950), Trinidadian-born English singer and songwriter
- Billy Odhiambo (born 1993), Kenyan rugby sevens player
- Billy Ogan (born 1966), Thai actor and singer
- Billy Ohlsson (born 1954), Swedish football player and manager
- Billy Olson (born 1958), American Olympic pole vaulter
- Billy Openshaw (1881–1945), English professional footballer
- Billy Orchard (1888–1965), Australian VFL player
- Billy Orr (disambiguation), several people
- Billy Osceola (1920–1974), Seminole minister and politician
- Billy Oskay, American violinist and record producer
- Billy Osmun (born 1943), American Dirt Modified racing driver
- Billy Oswald (1900–1969), Scottish footballer
- Billy Ott (1940–2015), American MLB player
- Billy Otterson (1862–1940), American MLB player
- Billy Ouattara (born 1992), Ghanaian-French professional basketball player
- Billy Owen (1872–1906), English footballer
- Billy Owens (born 1969), American NBA player
- Billy Owens (American football) (born 1965), American NFL player
- Billy Oxley (1899–1951), English footballer
- Billy Packer (1940–2023), American college basketball player, sportscaster, and author
- Billy Page, American musician, songwriter, and producer
- Billy Palmer (1887–1955), English professional footballer
- Billy Palmer (baseball) (1864–1933), English-born American MLB pitcher
- Billy Pang, Hong Kong Canadian politician
- Billy Papke (1886–1936), American boxer
- Billy Pappas (born 1984), American professional table football player and poker player
- Billy Pardon (1903–1969), Australian VFL player
- Billy Parish (born 1981), American environmental entrepreneur, author, and activist
- Billy Parker (disambiguation), several people
- Billy Parks (1948–2009), American NFL player
- Billy Payne (born 1947), American golf administrator
- Billy Payne (footballer) (1881–1967), Australian VFL player
- Billy Peach (born 1990), Canadian CFL player
- Billy Peake (1888–1960), English footballer
- Billy Pearce (born 1951), English performer, comedian, actor, and entertainer
- Billy Pearson (1920–2002), American thoroughbred horse racing jockey, quiz-show winner, art expert and dealer, and actor
- Billy Pearson (footballer) (1921–2009), Irish footballer
- Billy Pease (1899–1955), English international footballer
- Billy Peek (born 1940), American rock and roll- and blues guitarist, singer, songwriter, composer, and producer
- Billy Penrose (1925–1962), English jazz musician
- Billy Peplow (1885–after 1914), English professional footballer
- Billy Peterson, American bass player, songwriter, composer, session musician, and producer
- Billy Petrick (born 1984), American MLB pitcher
- Billy Petrolle (1905–1983), American professional boxer
- Billy Pharis (born 1981), Lebanese American basketball player
- Billy Phillips (soccer) (born 1956), American NASL and MISL player, and later coach
- Billy Phipps (1931–2011), American jazz baritone saxophonist and composer
- Billy Phillips (TV personality), British participant in Geordie Shore series 14
- Billy Picken (1956–2022), Australian VFL player
- Billy Pierce (1927–2015), American MLB starting pitcher
- Billy Pierce (choreographer) (1890–1933), African American choreographer, dancer, and dance studio owner
- Billy Pigg (1902–1968), English player of Northumbrian smallpipes
- Billy Pilkington (1894–1977), Irish soldier, candidate, and priest
- Billy Pincott (1875–1955), Australian VFL player
- Billy Pirie (1949–2025), Scottish footballer
- Billy Pittman (born 1984), American football player
- Billy Plunkett (1914–1960), Australian VFL player
- Billy Poe (born 1964), American NFL and AFL player
- Billy Pollard (born 2001), Australian rugby union player
- Billy Pollina (born 1961), American film- and television writer, producer, and director
- Billy Polston (1937–2001), American politician
- Billy Pontoni (born 1954), Colombian singer-songwriter and guitarist
- Billy Poole (1902–1964), English footballer
- Billy Porter (disambiguation), several people
- Billy Postlethwaite (born 1989), English actor
- Billy Poulson (1862–1937), English footballer
- Billy Powell (1952–2009), American musician
- Billy Powell (footballer) (1901–1981), English professional footballer
- Billy Power (disambiguation), several people
- Billy Poyntz (1894–1966), Welsh footballer
- Billy Pratt (disambiguation), several people
- Billy Prempeh, American candidate in the 2024 United States House of Representatives elections in New Jersey
- Billy Preston (1946–2006), American keyboardist, singer, and songwriter
- Billy Preston (basketball) (born 1997), American professional basketball player
- Billy Price (disambiguation), several people
- Billy Pricer (1934–1999), American NFL player
- Billy Pritchett (born 1951), American NFL player
- Billy Probert (1893–1948), English footballer
- Billy Proctor (born 1999), New Zealand professional rugby union player
- Billy Puckett (born 2007), American football player
- Billy Purcell (1961–2019), Irish hurler
- Billy Purtell (1886–1962), American MLB player
- Billy Purvis (disambiguation), several people
- Billy Pye (1930–2010), English footballer
- Billy Quarantillo (born 1988), American mixed martial artist
- Billy Queen, American undercover agent with the U.S. ATF, and author
- Billy Queen (baseball) (1928–2006), American MLB player
- Billy Quinn (disambiguation), several people
- Billy Quirk (1873–1926), American stage- and silent-film actor
- Billy Race (1896–1972), English footballer
- Billy Rackard (1930–2009), Irish hurler and Gaelic footballer
- Billy Radloff, South African international lawn bowler
- Billy Rae, Canadian international lawn bowls player
- Billy Rafferty (born 1950), Scottish footballer
- Billy Raffoul, Canadian rock singer-songwriter
- Billy Rafter (born 1929), American stock car driver
- Billy Raimondi (1912–2010), American professional baseball player
- Billy Rancher (1957–1986), American rock vocalist and songwriter
- Billy Ranieri, American restaurant founder
- Billy Rankin (disambiguation), several people
- Billy Rath, American past member of punk rock band The Heartbreakers
- Billy Rautenbach (born 1959), Zimbabwean businessman
- Billy Ray (disambiguation), several people
- Billy Rayner (1935–2006), Australian rugby league footballer
- Billy Reay (1918–2004), Canadian NHL player and coach
- Billy Redden (born 1956), American actor
- Billy Red Lyons (1932–2009), Canadian professional wrestler
- Billy Redman (1928–1994), English footballer
- Billy Redmayne (1991–2016), Manx soldier and motorcycle racer
- Billy Redmond (1853–1894), American MLB player
- Billy Reed (disambiguation), several people
- Billy Rees (1924–1996), Welsh professional footballer
- Billy Reeves (born 1965), English songwriter, musician, record producer, and broadcaster
- Billy Reeves (footballer) (born 1996), Welsh professional footballer
- Billy Reid (disambiguation), several people
- Billy Reil (1979–2024), American professional wrestler
- Billy Reina (born 1972), German professional footballer
- Billy Reynolds (disambiguation), several people
- Billy Rhiel (1900–1946), American MLB player
- Billy Rhines (1869–1922), American MLB pitcher
- Billy Rhodes (disambiguation), several people
- Billy Rice (1938–2008), Northern Irish-born Australian soccer player
- Billy Rich (born 1949), American electric bassist and blues musician
- Billy Richards (disambiguation), several people
- Billy Riebock (born c. 1984), American college football coach
- Billy Riggs, American author, city planner, entrepreneur, and professor of management
- Billy Riker, American member of progressive rock band 3
- Billy Riley (1896–1977), English professional wrestler
- Billy Ringrose (cricketer) (1871–1943), English cricketer
- Billy Ringrose (equestrian) (1930–2020), Irish equestrian
- Billy Ritchie (1936–2016), Scottish professional footballer
- Billy Ritchie (musician) (born 1944), Scottish keyboard player and composer
- Billy Roberts (disambiguation), several people
- Billy Robinson (disambiguation), several people
- Billy Robson (1907–1985), English footballer
- Billy Roche (born 1949), Irish playwright and actor
- Billy Rodaway (born 1954), English footballer and manager
- Billy Roe (born 1957), American racing driver
- Billy Rogell (1904–2003), American MLB player
- Billy Rogers (disambiguation), several people
- Billy Rohr (born 1945), American attorney and MLB starting pitcher
- Billy Ronson (1957–2015), English NASL- and MISL player
- Billy Rooks (1890–1972), English footballer
- Billy Root (disambiguation), several people
- Billy Rose (1899–1966), American impresario, theatrical showman, lyricist, and columnist; husband of Fanny Brice
- Billy Rose (curler) (1904–1987), Canadian curler
- Billy Rosen (1928–2019), American bridge player
- Billy Ross (1909–1969), Irish international rugby union player
- Billy Rowesome (born 1956), Irish sportsperson
- Billy Ruane, American music promoter
- Billy Rudd (born 1941), English footballer
- Billy Rudd (Australian footballer) (1894–1961), Australian VFL player
- Billy Ruge (c. 1866/1870–1955), American film actor
- Billy Russell (disambiguation), several people
- Billy Ryan (1887–1951), American college football player
- Billy Ryan (hurler) (born 1996), Irish hurler
- Billy Ryckman (born 1955), American NFL player
- Billy Rymer (born 1984), American musician
- Billy Sadler (born 1981), American MLB relief pitcher
- Billy Sage (1893–1968), English professional footballer
- Billy Sammeth (1951–2018), American talent manager, writer, and television producer- and personality
- Billy Sample (born 1955), American MLB player
- Billy Sanders (1955–1985), Australian international Speedway rider
- Billy Sandow (1884–1972), American professional wrestler and promoter
- Billy Sands (1911–1984), American character actor
- Billy Santoro (born 1975/1976), American gay pornographic film actor
- Billy Sarll (1899–1982), Australian VFL player
- Billy Sass-Davies (born 2000), Welsh professional footballer
- Billy Saunders (born 1937), Canadian WHL player
- Billy Savidan (1902–1991), New Zealand long distance runner
- Billy Sawilchik (born 1971), American musical artist; member of alternative rock band Lovehammers
- Billy Scannell (born 1999), Irish rugby union player
- Billy Scarratt (1878–1958), English footballer
- Billy Schaeffer (born 1951), American ABA player
- Billy Schmidt (1887–1975), Australian VFA and VFL player
- Billy Schrauth, American college football player
- Billy Schuler (born 1990), American professional soccer player
- Billy Schwer (born 1969), English professional boxer
- Billy Scott (disambiguation), several people
- Billy Seamon (1917–1992), American bridge player
- Billy Searle (born 1996), English rugby union player
- Billy Sela (born 2005), English rugby union player
- Billy Sellars (1907–1987), English professional footballer
- Billy Semple (born 1946), Scottish professional footballer
- Billy Serad (1863–1925), American MLB pitcher
- Billy Seymour (born 1999), Irish hurler
- Billy Shantz (1927–1993), American MLB player and manager
- Billy Sharp (born 1986), English professional footballer
- Billy Shaw (1938–2024), American AFL player
- Billy Shaw (Australian footballer) (1872–1938), Australian VFL player
- Billy Shearman, English footballer
- Billy Shearsby (born 1972), Australian track cyclist
- Billy Sheehan (born 1953), American bassist
- Billy Sheehan (Gaelic footballer) (born 1981), Irish Gaelic football manager and player
- Billy Sheehan (rugby union) (c. 1903–c. 1957), Australian rugby union player
- Billy Shepherd (disambiguation), several people
- Billy Shergold (1923–1968), Welsh professional footballer
- Billy Sheridan (disambiguation), several people
- Billy Sherrill (1936–2015), American record producer, songwriter, and arranger
- Billy Sherring (1877–1964), Canadian athlete
- Billy Sherrington (1890–1977), English football manager and businessman
- Billy Sherwood (born 1965), American multi-instrumentalist, songwriter, singer, record producer, and mixing engineer
- Billy Shields (born 1954), American NFL player
- Billy Shilton (born 1998), English Paralympic table tennis player
- Billy Shindle (1860–1936), American MLB player
- Billy Shipp (1929–2011), Canadian CFL player
- Billy Shipstad, American curler
- Billy Shotts, birth name of Lee Clayton (1942–2023), American songwriter and musician
- Billy Shreve (born 1967), American politician and realtor
- Billy Silto (1883–after 1919), English footballer
- Billy Silverman (born 1962), American professional wrestling referee
- Billy Simmonds (born 1980), Australian entrepreneur, martial artist, and veganism activist
- Billy Simmons (c. 1780–c. 1860), African-born American Jewish scholar and newspaper deliverer
- Billy Simons, American singer-songwriter
- Billy Simpson (disambiguation), several people
- Billy Sims (born 1955), American NFL player
- Billy Sinclair (born 1945), American convicted murderer
- Billy Sinclair (footballer), Scottish professional footballer
- Billy Sing (1886–1943), Australian soldier during World War I
- Billy Singh, Fijian football coach
- Billy Singleton (born 1968), American BBL player
- Billy Sipple (1941–c. 1989), American man known for intervening to prevent an assassination attempt against U.S. President Gerald R. Ford
- Billy Six (born 1986), German independent journalist, activist, author, and vlogger
- Billy Slade (1941–2019), Welsh cricketer
- Billy Slater (born 1983), Australian professional rugby league footballer
- Billy Slater (footballer) (1858–after 1883), English footballer
- Billy Slaughter (born 1980), American film- and television actor
- Billy (slave) (c. 1754–c. 1785), African-American slave accused of treason
- Billy Sleeth (born 1979), American soccer player
- Billy Smart (disambiguation), several people
- Billy Smiley (born 1957), American Christian music producer, songwriter, and musician
- Billy Smith (disambiguation), several people
- Billy Smyth (c. 1925–2005), Northern Irish footballer
- Billy Snaddon (born 1969), Scottish professional snooker player
- Billy Snedden (1926–1987), Australian politician
- Billy Snoddy, Northern Irish politician
- Billy Soose (1915–1998), American boxer
- Billy Sorrell (1940–2008), American MLB player
- Billy Sothern (1977–2022), American lawyer
- Billy Southworth (1893–1969), American MLB player
- Billy Southworth Jr. (1917–1945), American MLB player and World War II Army bomber pilot
- Billy Sowden (1930–2010), English professional footballer
- Billy Spanoulis (born 1982), Greek NBA player and coach
- Billy Spears (1877–1957), Australian VFL player
- Billy Spence (c. 1924–1980), Northern Irish politician
- Billy Spencer (1902–1969), English footballer
- Billy Sperrin (1922–2000), English footballer and coach
- Billy Spiller (1886–1970), Welsh rugby union player and cricketer
- Billy Spittle (1893–1979), English professional footballer
- Billy Spivey (born 1969), American politician
- Billy Sprague (born 1952), American Christian pop singer, songwriter, and producer
- Billy Spurdle (1926–2011), Guernsey-born English footballer
- Billy Squier (born 1950), American musician, singer, and songwriter
- Billy Stack (born 1948), English footballer
- Billy Stacy (1936–2019), American NFL player
- Billy Stage (1893–1957), English professional association footballer
- Billy Stagg (born 1957), English footballer
- Billy Stairmand (born 1989), New Zealand surfer
- Billy Stamps (1911–1980), American football player and coach
- Billy Standridge (1953–2014), American stock car racing driver
- Billy Stanlake (born 1994), Australian cricketer
- Billy Stanton (1904–1995), Irish hurler
- Billy Stark (born 1956), Scottish footballer and coach
- Billy Stark (footballer, born 1937) (born 1937), Scottish professional footballer
- Billy Stead (1877–1958), New Zealand rugby union player
- Billy Stedman (born 1999), English professional footballer
- Billy Steel (1923–1982), Scottish professional footballer
- Billy Steele (disambiguation), several people
- Billy Steinberg (born 1950), American songwriter, musician, and record producer
- Billy Stelling (born 1969), South African-born Dutch cricketer
- Billy Stephens (1918–2006), Australian VFL player
- Billy Steuart (1936–2022), South African swimmer
- Billy Stevens (born 1945), American NHL and AFL player
- Billy Stevens (Australian footballer) (1905–1987), Australian VFL player
- Billy Stewart (disambiguation), several people
- Billy Stiles (1871–1908), American outlaw in the Old West
- Billy Stockman Tjapaltjarri (c. 1927–2015), Anmatyerr Australian artist
- Billy Stokes, Australian professional rugby league footballer
- Billy Stone (disambiguation), several people
- Billy Stott (1913–1972), English professional rugby league footballer
- Billy Strachan (1921–1998), British communist, civil rights activist, and pilot
- Billy Strange (1930–2012), American singer, songwriter, musician, guitarist, and actor
- Billy Straus, American music producer and songwriter
- Billy Strayhorn (1915–1967), American jazz composer, pianist, lyricist, and arranger
- Billy Stretch (born 1996), Australian AFL player
- Billy Strings (born 1992), American guitarist, singer, songwriter, and bluegrass musician
- Billy Stritch (born 1962), American composer, arranger, vocalist, and jazz pianist
- Billy Strother (born 1982), American NFL player
- Billy Stuart (1900–1978), Canadian NHL player
- Billy Suede, Canadian professional wrestler
- Billy Sullivan (disambiguation), several people
- Billy Sunday (1862–1935), American evangelist and professional baseball player
- Billy Sutcliffe (1926–1998), English cricketer
- Billy Suter (1874–1946), American football- and baseball player, coach, referee, athletic director, and newspaper publisher
- Billy Swan (born 1942), American country singer-songwriter
- Billy Sweetzer (born 1958), Canadian professional soccer player
- Billy Sweezey (born 1996), American AHL and NHL player
- Billy Syahputra (born 1991), Indonesian actor, presenter, and comedian
- Billy Tabram (1909–1992), Welsh footballer
- Billy Talagi, Niuean politician
- Billy Talbot (born 1943), American singer-songwriter and musician; member of Crazy Horse
- Billy Talen, American performance group leader
- Billy Tan, Malaysian comic book artist
- Billy Tang (1950/1951–2020), Hong Kong film director
- Billy Tanner (born 1981), American professional stock car racing driver
- Billy Tauzin (born 1943), American lobbyist and politician
- Billy Taylor (disambiguation), several people
- Billy Teall (c. 1912–2001), English professional rugby league footballer
- Billy Teare, Northern Irish storyteller
- Billy Te Kahika (born 1972), New Zealand conspiracy theorist, blues musician, and political candidate; son of Billy TK
- Billy Telford (born 1956), English professional footballer
- Billy Tempest (1893–1945), English footballer
- Billy Tennant, South African professional flowboarder
- Billy Tennant (footballer) (1865–1927), English professional footballer
- Billy Ternent (1899–1977), English orchestra leader
- Billy Terrell (born 2003), English professional footballer
- Billy Thirlaway (1896–1983), English professional footballer
- Billy Thomas (disambiguation), several people
- Billy Thompson (disambiguation), several people
- Billy Thomson (disambiguation), several people
- Billy Thornton (disambiguation), several people
- Billy Thorpe (1946–2007), English-born Australian singer-songwriter, record producer, guitarist, and writer
- Billy Ray Thunder (born 1954), American rodeo performer
- Billy Thunderkloud (1948–2018), Canadian First Nation country musician
- Billy Tibbetts (born 1974), American NHL player
- Billy Tidwell (1930–1990), American NFL player
- Billy Timmins (born 1959), Irish politician
- Billy Tipton (1914–1989), American jazz musician, bandleader, and talent broker
- Billy Tjampitjinpa Kenda (born c. 1967), Pitjantjatjara and Luritja artist
- Billy TK (born 1943), New Zealand Māori musician, guitarist, vocalist, and songwriter
- Billy Todd (1929–2008), American member of Southern Gospel quartet Florida Boys
- Billy Tohill (1939–2000), American football player and coach
- Billy Tolley, American contestant on Ghost Adventures
- Billy Tompkinson (1895–1968), English footballer
- Billy Toms (1895–?), Irish footballer
- Billy Tourtelot (born 1970), American singer, guitarist, and songwriter for heavy metal and industrial band Hell on Earth
- Billy Traber (born 1979), American MLB pitcher
- Billy Travis (1961–2002), American professional wrestler
- Billy Treacy, Irish rugby league footballer
- Billy Tremelling (1905–1961), English professional footballer
- Billy Trew (1879–1926), Welsh international rugby union player
- Billy Tripp (born 1955), American outsider artist, poet, writer, painter, welder, and sculptor
- Billy Troughear (1885–1955), English footballer
- Billy Truax (1943–2026), American NFL player
- Billy Trumble (1863–1944), Australian cricketer
- Billy Tsikrikas (born 1995), Australian-born Greek international rugby league footballer
- Billy Tubbs (1935–2020), American men's college basketball coach
- Billy Tucci, American comics creator
- Billy Tucker (born 1948), English professional footballer
- Billy Tudor (1918–1965), Welsh professional footballer
- Billy Tuft (1874–after 1906), English professional association footballer
- Billy Tunnicliffe (1920–1997), English professional footballer
- Billy Tunnicliffe (footballer, born 1864) (1864–?), English footballer
- Billy Turley (born 1973), English footballer
- Billy Turner (1940–2021), American Thoroughbred flat racing trainer
- Billy Turner (American football) (born 1991), American NFL player
- Billy Twelvetrees (born 1988), English rugby union footballer
- Billy Twemlow (1892–1933), English footballer
- Billy Twomey (born 1977), Irish equestrian and show jumping rider
- Billy Two Rivers (1935–2023), Canadian Mohawk professional wrestler, actor, and Mohawks of Kahnawà:ke leader
- Billy Tyler (1900–1974), English professional footballer
- Billy Uhl (born 1950), American professional motorcycle enduro competitor
- Billy Unger (born 1995), American actor
- Billy Urbanski (1903–1973), American MLB player
- Billy Urquhart (born 1956), Scottish professional footballer
- Billy Usselton (1926–1994), American jazz reed player
- Billy V, American veteran radio broadcast personality, television reporter- and personality, entertainer, emcee, and actor
- Billy Valentine (born 1925), American blues-, R&B-, and jazz pianist and singer
- Billy Valentine, American singer
- Billy Van (disambiguation), several people
- Billy Varga (1919–2013), American professional wrestler and actor
- Billy Vassiliadis, American business executive of R&R Partners
- Billy Vaughn (1919–1991), American musician, singer, multi-instrumentalist, orchestra leader, and A&R man
- Billy Venturini (born 1976), American professional stock car racing driver and team owner
- Billy Vera (born 1944), American singer, songwriter, actor, author, and music historian
- Billy Vessels (1931–2001), American WIFU- and CFL player
- Billy Vojtek (born 1943), Croatian-born Australian soccer player
- Billy Volek (born 1976), American NFL player
- Billy Vukovich III (1963–1990), American race car driver
- Billy Vunipola (born 1992), Australian-born British professional rugby union player
- Billy Waddy (1954–2022), American NFL player
- Billy Wade (disambiguation), several people
- Billy Wagner III, American man charged with murder in the Pike County shootings
- Billy Waith (1950–2022), Welsh boxer
- Billy Walik (born 1947), American NFL, WFL, and CFL player
- Billy Walkabout (1949–2007), Native American soldier during the Vietnam War
- Billy Walker (disambiguation), several people
- Billy Walsh (disambiguation), several people
- Billy Wease (born 1986), American racing driver
- Billy Weber, American film editor and director
- Billy Webster (1909–?), English professional footballer
- Billy Wedlock (1880–1965), English footballer
- Billy Weepu, New Zealand rugby league footballer
- Billy Wells (1889–1967), English boxer
- Billy Wells (American football) (1931–2001), American NFL- and AFL player
- Billy Wells (footballer) (1916–1984), Australian VFL player
- Billy Welsh (1904–1978), Scottish professional footballer
- Billy Welu (1932–1974), American professional bowler, PBA executive, and bowling broadcaster- and ambassador
- Billy Werber (1908–2009), American MLB player
- Billy Werner (born 1977), American musician, singer, songwriter, and DJ
- Billy Wesley (born 1971), American politician
- Billy Westbay (1950s–2000), American rock climber
- Billy West (disambiguation), several people
- Billy Weston (1847–1935), Australasian billiards champion
- Billy Walker (disambiguation), several people
- Billy Wallace (rugby union) (1878–1972), New Zealand rugby union footballer and foundryman
- Billy Wallace (socialite) (1927–1977), British socialite
- Billy Walters (disambiguation), several people
- Billy Walton (1871–1963), English footballer
- Billy Walton (hurler) (1961–2012), Irish hurler
- Billy Wara (c. 1920–2008), Australian Aboriginal craftsman
- Billy Warbrick (c. 1866–1901), New Zealand rugby union footballer
- Billy Ward (disambiguation), several people
- Billy Wardle (1918–1989), English professional footballer
- Billy Warlock (born 1961), American actor
- Billy Wasmund (1887–1911), American football player and coach
- Billy Waters (disambiguation), several people
- Billy Watkin (1932–2001), English footballer
- Billy Watkins (disambiguation), several people
- Billy Watson (disambiguation), several people
- Billy Watts (disambiguation), several people
- Billy Waugh (1929–2023), American soldier and paramilitary operations officer
- Billy Waugh (footballer) (1921–2009), Scottish footballer
- Billy Wayne (disambiguation), several people
- Billy Wayte (born 1938), American CFL player
- Billy Wharton (born 1969), American adult educator, political writer, and activist
- Billy Wheatley (1920–1965), English professional footballer
- Billy Whelan (1935–1958), Irish footballer
- Billy Whelan (Scottish footballer) (1906–1982), Scottish footballer
- Billy Whitaker (1923–1995), English professional footballer
- Billy White (disambiguation), several people
- Billy Whitehouse (born 1996), English professional footballer
- Billy Whitehurst (born 1959), English professional footballer
- Billy Whitlock (c. 1813–1878), American blackface performer
- Billy Wilder (1906–2002), American filmmaker and screenwriter
- Billy Wiles (born 1971), American professional wrestler
- Billy Wiles (American football) (born 2002), American college football player
- Billy Wilkins, American past member of Christian rock band Third Day
- Billy Wilkinson (born 1951), Scottish professional footballer
- Billy Williams (disambiguation), several people
- Billy Williamson (disambiguation), several people
- Billy Wilson (disambiguation), several people
- Billy Wilton (1889–1966), Australian VFL player
- Billy Windle (1920–2011), English footballer
- Billy Wingrove (born 1982), English member of freestyle football duo F2Freestylers
- Billy Winn (disambiguation), several people
- Billy Winstanley (fl. 1886–1913), English professional rugby league footballer
- Billy Winward (1920–2015), Australian VFL player
- Billy Wirth (born 1962), American Hollywood actor, film producer, and fashion model
- Billy Withall (1928–2020), British Army soldier
- Billy Wolfe (1896–1963), American professional wrestling promoter
- Billy Wolfe (politician) (1924–2010), Scottish accountant, manufacturer, and politician
- Billy Wood (1905–1975), Australian VFL player
- Billy Wood (footballer, born 1900) (fl. 1900–1926), English footballer
- Billy Woodberry (born 1950), American film director
- Billy Woodford, British founder of record label NoCopyrightSounds
- Billy Woods (disambiguation), several people
- Billy Woodward (disambiguation), several people
- Billy Wooldridge (1878–1945), English footballer
- Billy Wootton (1904–2000), English footballer
- Billy Wright (disambiguation), several people
- Billy Wynne (disambiguation), several people
- Billy Yates (disambiguation), several people
- Billy Yeats (1951–2013), English footballer
- Billy Yenson (1883–1944), English professional footballer
- Billy Young (disambiguation), several people
- Billy Younger (1940–2007), English footballer
- Billy Yow, American candidate in the 2010 United States House of Representatives elections in North Carolina
- Billy Yule (born c. 1954), American musician
- Billy Zane (born 1966), American actor
- Billy Zane Muna, American member of heavy metal band Sicmonic
- Billy Zeoli (1932–2015), American evangelical leader, speaker, and media executive
- Billy Zero (born 1971), American radio personality
- Billy Zitzmann (1895–1985), American MLB player
- Billy Zoom (born 1948), American guitarist; member of punk rock band X
- Billy Zulch (1886–1924), South African international cricketer
- Billy Zver (born 1987), Macedonian rapper
- Delta Blind Billy (1???–????), American Delta blues artist and outlaw

== Fictional ==
- Billy Casper, in the 1968 UK novel A Kestrel for a Knave
- Billy Conway, in the 2009 Australian coming-of-age comedy drama film Accidents Happen, played by Harrison Gilbertson
- Billy (Billy and Mandy), in the US animated TV series The Grim Adventures of Billy and Mandy, voiced by Richard Steven Horvitz
- Billy (Black Christmas), in the Canadian-US horror film series Black Christmas
- Billy Abbott, in the US TV soap opera The Young and the Restless
- Billy Barlow, in the 1917 US silent comedy drama film Billy and the Big Stick, played by Raymond McKee
- Billy Baker (disambiguation), several characters
- Billy Bathgate, in the 1989 US novel of the same name
- Billy Batson, in the all-ages comic book series Billy Batson and the Magic of Shazam!
- Billy Bedlam, in the 1997 US action thriller film Con Air, played by Nick Chinlund
- Billy Bibbit, in the 1962 US novel One Flew Over the Cuckoo's Nest
- Billy Black (character), in the fantasy romance Twilight novels, played by Gil Birmingham in the films
- Billy Blade, in the 2005 action-adventure video game Billy Blade and the Temple of Time
- Billy Blaze, in the Commander Keen series of side-scrolling platform video games
- Billy Bleach, in the comedy sketch show The Fast Show, played by Simon Day
- Billy Blim, in the US supernatural TV series Angel, played by Justin Shilton
- Billy Bones, in the 1883 Scottish novel Treasure Island, by Robert Louis Stevenson
- Billy Braddock, alter ego of UK superhero Spider-UK appearing in US Marvel comic books
- Billy Brit, UK puppet character
- Billy Brodie, in the UK soap opera Hollyoaks, played by Clive Russell and Rian Gordon
- Billy Budd, the title character of the US novella by Herman Melville
- Billy Bunter, schoolboy created by Charles Hamilton
- Billy Butcher, in the US media franchise The Boys, played by Karl Urban, Jason Isaacs, and Kay Eluvian
- Billy Chapel (character), in the 1991 US novel For Love of the Game
- Billy Chapman (character), in the US Christmas horror film series Silent Night, Deadly Night
- Billy Chenowith, in the US drama TV series Six Feet Under, played by Jeremy Sisto
- Billy Coen, in the survival horror video game Resident Evil Zero
- Billy Colton, in the US action-adventure TV series MacGyver, played by Cuba Gooding Jr. and Lance Gross
- Billy Connors (character), in US Marvel comic books
- Billy Corkhill, in the UK TV soap opera Brookside, played by John McArdle
- Billy Costigan, in the 2006 crime thriller film The Departed, played by Leonardo DiCaprio
- Billy Cranston, the Blue Ranger in the US superhero TV series Mighty Morphin Power Rangers
- Billy Crocker (Anything Goes), in the 1930s musical Anything Goes
- Billy Cutshaw, in the 1980 US psychological drama film The Ninth Configuration, played by Scott Wilson
- Billy Dane, in the UK comic strip Billy's Boots
- Billy Dilley, in the US animated TV series Billy Dilley's Super-Duper Subterranean Summer, voiced by Aaron Springer
- Billy Douglas (One Life to Live), in the US soap opera One Life to Live, played by Ryan Phillippe
- Billy Fletcher, in the UK TV soap opera Emmerdale, played by Jay Kontzle
- Billy Flynn (Chicago), in the 1926 play Chicago, played by Edward Ellis
- Billy Grade, in the UK period crime drama TV series Peaky Blinders, played by Emmett J. Scanlan
- Billy Hargrove, in the US science fiction horror TV series Stranger Things, played by Dacre Montgomery
- Billy Hopwood, in the UK TV soap opera Emmerdale, played by David Crellin
- Billy Kane, in the Fatal Fury fighting game series
- Billy Kaplan, superhero appearing in US Marvel comic books published
- Billy Katagiri, in the Japanese anime TV series Mobile Suit Gundam 00, voiced by Yūji Ueda (Japanese) and Kirby Morrow (English)
- Billy Keikeya, in the 2004 US TV series Battlestar Galactica, played by Paul Campbell
- Billy Kennedy (disambiguation), several characters
- Billy Kessler, in the comic book series G.I. Joe: A Real American Hero
- Billy Kincaid, in the comic book series Spawn
- Billy Kong, in the UK fantasy novel series Artemis Fowl
- Billy Lamb, in the UK TV drama series Silk, played by Neil Stuke
- Billy Lee (disambiguation), several characters
- Billy Leotardo, the younger brother of Phil Leotardo from The Sopranos
- Billy Lewis (disambiguation), several characters
- Billy Loomer, in the US live action sitcom Ned's Declassified School Survival Guide, voiced by Kyle Swann
- Billy Mack, in the 2003 Christmas romantic comedy film Love Actually, played by Bill Nighy
- Billy Madison, in the 1995 US comedy film Billy Madison, played by Adam Sandler
- Billy Makin, in the UK TV soap opera Coronation Street, played by Jimmy Ogden
- Billy Mallett, in the UK TV soap opera Coronation Street, played by Lewis Ablatt
- Billy Malone, in the US superhero TV series Arrow, played by Tyler Ritter
- Billy Mayhew, in the UK TV soap opera Coronation Street, played by Daniel Brocklebank
- Billy Miles (The X-Files), in the US science fiction drama TV series The X-Files, played by Zachary Ansley
- Billy Mitchell (EastEnders), in the UK TV soap opera EastEnders, played by Perry Fenwick and George Greenland
- Billy Owens, in the 2010 fantasy film Billy Owens and the Secret of the Runes, played by Dalton Mugridge
- Billy Pilgrim, in Kurt Vonnegut's 1969 novel Slaughterhouse-Five
- Billy Platt, in the UK TV soap opera Coronation Street
- Billy Prior, in the Regeneration Trilogy novels
- Billy Quan, in the US sketch comedy TV series Almost Live!, played by Darrell Suto
- Billy Quizboy, in the US adult animated action comedy TV series The Venture Bros., voiced by Doc Hammer
- Billy Ray Valentine, in the 1983 US comedy film Trading Places, played by Eddie Murphy
- Billy Rowan, in the UK TV drama The Bill series 23
- Billy Shoepack, in the 1989 UK children's TV series Tugs, voiced by Lee Cornes, Masaaki Madono, Rokurō Naya, and Paul Dobson
- Billy Smith (disambiguation), several characters
- Billy Sole, in the US science fiction action anthology media franchise Predator, played by Sonny Landham
- Billy Sparks, in the US TV sitcom The Big Bang Theory, played by Wyatt McClure
- Billy the Bee, UK newspaper comic strip during the 1950s
- Billy the Bionic Badger, in the Canadian underground comic strip Space Moose
- Billy the Cat (disambiguation), several people
- Billy Thompson, in the UK cartoon strip Billy the Fish
- Billy the Marlin, the official mascot of the Miami Marlins baseball franchise
- Billy the Mime, in the 2005 US documentary comedy film The Aristocrats, played by Steven Banks
- Billy the Puppet, in the US horror media franchise Saw, voiced by Tobin Bell and Costas Mandylor
- Billy Walsh (Third Watch), in the US crime drama TV series Third Watch, played by Bill Walsh
- Billy Wayne Ruddick, in the US political satire mockumentary-style TV series Who Is America?, played by Sacha Baron Cohen
- Billy Whizz, in the UK comic The Beano
- Billy Williams (Coronation Street), in the UK TV soap opera Coronation Street, played by Frank Mills
- Billy-Ben Turner, in the US fantasy science fiction horror anthology TV series The Twilight Zone
- Billy Bibit, in the 1994 Philippine biographical action film Col. Billy Bibit, RAM, played by Rommel Padilla
- Billy Walker, in the UK TV soap opera Coronation Street, played by Kenneth Farrington
- Billy Goat, in the Donald Duck universe
- Billy Joe Cobra, in the 2013 UK-French animated TV series Dude, That's My Ghost!, voiced by Darren Foreman
- Billy Brennan, in the 2001 US science fiction action film Jurassic Park III, played by Alessandro Nivola
- Billy Campbell, in the US prime-time TV soap opera Melrose Place, played by Andrew Shue
- Billy Davis, in the UK TV soap opera River City, played by Gray O'Brien
- Billy Claimers, in the US post-apocalyptic horror drama TV series The Walking Dead, played by Eric Mendenhall
- Billy, in the UK mystery Sherlock Holmes novel series
- Billy Black, one of J. D. Salinger's short story characters
- Billy Bauer, in the UK science fiction anthology TV series Black Mirror, played by Topher Grace
- Billy Bradshaw, in the UK family created and voiced by Buzz Hawkins
- Billy, in the US comedy TV series The Comedians, played by Billy Crystal
- Billy Cole, in the 1991 US buddy action comedy film The Last Boy Scout, played by Billy Blanks
- Billy Bob Brockali, in the animatronic character band The Rock-afire Explosion, voiced by Aaron Fechter
- Billy West, in the US animated science fiction sitcom Futurama
- Billy Zero, in the 2007 Canadian psychological drama film The Tracey Fragments, played by Slim Twig
- Billy McCormack, in the UK TV sitcom Two Pints of Lager and a Packet of Crisps, played by Freddie Hogan
- Billy Apples, in the 1995 Australian musical film Billy's Holiday, played by Max Cullen
- Billy Bat, a talking anthropomorphic bat in the Japanese manga series of the same name
- Billy Blazes, in the 1919 US short comedy film Billy Blazes, Esq., played by Harold Lloyd
- Billy Chadwick, in the US police procedural series CSI: Miami, played by Lew Temple
- Billy Collier, in the 1998 US independent romantic comedy film Billy's Hollywood Screen Kiss, played by Sean Hayes
- Billy Elliot, in the 2000 UK coming-of-age comedy-drama film Billy Elliot, played by Jamie Bell (young) and Adam Cooper (dancer) (aged 25)
- Billy Fisher, in the 1963 UK CinemaScope comedy-drama film Billy Liar; based on the 1959 novel of the same name, played by Tom Courtenay
- Billy Francis Kopecki, in the 1988 US fantasy comedy-drama film Big, played by Jared Rushton
- Billy Galvin, in the 1986 US drama film Billy Galvin, played by Lenny Von Dohlen
- Billy Grant, in the 1993 action/martial arts film Showdown, played by Billy Blanks
- Billy Grey, in the 2009 video game expansion pack Grand Theft Auto: The Lost and Damned
- Billy Hitchcock, in the US horror franchise Final Destination, played by Seann William Scott
- Billy Jack, in the 1971 US action drama independent film Billy Jack, played by Tom Laughlin, and in the 1977 sequel
- Billy Jim, in the 1922 US silent comedy western film Billy Jim, played by Fred Stone
- Billy Jo Jive, animated character in the US educational children's TV series Sesame Street, voiced by Ray Favata
- Billy K, in the Canadian musical drama TV series Catwalk, played by J. H. Wyman
- Billy Kid, in the 2024 action role-playing video game Zenless Zone Zero, voiced by Chen Runqiu (Chinese), Clifford Chapin (English), Yū Hayashi (Japanese), and Lee Jo-seung (Korean)
- Billy Kimber, in the UK period crime drama TV series Peaky Blinders, played by Charlie Creed-Miles; based on the real Billy Kimber
- Billy Loomis, in the 1996 US slasher film Scream, played by Skeet Ulrich
- Billy Lynn, in the 2012 satirical war novel Billy Lynn's Long Halftime Walk; played by Joe Alwyn in the 2016 war drama film adaptation
- Billy MacGregor, in the US sitcom TV series Head of the Class; and its spin-off Billy, played by Billy Connolly
- Billy Masterson, in the 1997 English-language French science fiction action film The Fifth Element, played by Luke Perry
- Billy Nolan, antagonist in Stephen King's Carrie
- Billy Peltzer, in the 1984 and 1990 US comedy horror films Gremlins and Gremlins 2: The New Batch, played by Zach Galligan
- Billy Quinn, in the 1989 US-Canadian Christmas fantasy drama film Prancer, played by Johnny Galecki
- Billy Russo, alternate name of supervillain Jigsaw, appearing in US comic books published by Marvel Comics
- Billy Summers, in the 2021 US crime novel Billy Summers
- Billy Sunday, in the 1995 Australian novel Billy Sunday
- Billy Sunday, in the 2000 US drama film Men of Honor, played by Robert De Niro
- Billy Tate, in the US sitcom TV series Soap, played by Jimmy Baio
- Billy Thunderman, in the US comedy TV series The Thundermans, played by Diego Velazquez
- Billy Two Hats, in the 1974 US Western film Billy Two Hats, played by Desi Arnaz Jr.
- Billy Twofeathers, in the children's TV series Shining Time Station, played by Tom Jackson (actor)
- Billy, a hamster character in Billy The Cowboy Hamster and Dudley Do-Right, played by Jim Conroy
- Billy, in the 1936 US children's picture book Billy and Blaze
- Billy, the stage name for Bill the Cat in the 1987 comic strip collection Billy and the Boingers Bootleg by Berkeley Breathed.
- Billy, in the 2003 3D platform game Billy Hatcher and the Giant Egg
- Billy, in the Franco-Belgian comic Billy the Cat
- Billy, in the UK children's TV series Thomas & Friends
- Billy, in the Uruguayan animated TV series Billy the Krill
- Billy, in the US animated TV franchise Adventure Time, voiced by Lou Ferrigno
- Sport Billy, in the US animated TV series Sport Billy, voiced by Lane Scheimer

== See also ==
- Billy (surname)
- Billie (disambiguation)
- Billy (disambiguation)
- Bertrand de Billy (born 1965), French conductor
- Jacques de Billy (1602–1679), French Jesuit mathematician
- Jacques de Billy (abbot) (1535–1581), French patristic scholar, theologian, jurist, linguist and Benedictine abbot
