= Billy Barker =

Billy Barker is the name of:

- William Barker (prospector) (1817–1894), English miner and prospector who found gold in Canada
- William George Barker (1894–1930), Canadian World War I flying ace and Victoria Cross recipient
- Billy Barker (footballer, born 1883) (1883–1937), English footballer

== See also ==
- William Barker (disambiguation)
