= Billy Munro =

Billy Munro may refer to:

- Morndi Munro, or Billy Munro, last fluent speaker of the Unggumi language of Western Australia
- Billy Munro (rugby union) (1918–1970), Scottish rugby union player
