= Billy Stevens (Australian footballer) =

Australian rules footballer, born 1905

Personal information
- Full name: William Henry Stevens
- Born: 6 August 1905; Ballarat, Victoria
- Died: 29 September 1987 (aged 82)
- Original team: Ballarat

Playing career^{1}
Years	Club	Games (Goals)
1930–31	St Kilda	23 (9)
- ^{1} Playing statistics correct to the end of 1931.

William Henry Stevens (6 August 1905 – 29 September 1987) was an Australian rules footballer who played with St Kilda in the Victorian Football League (VFL).
