= Billy Hennebery =

Irish hurler

Personal information
- Native name: Liam Mac an Rí (Irish)
- Born: 1 May 1888 Mooncoin, County Kilkenny, Ireland
- Died: 16 February 1965 (aged 76) Mooncoin, County Kilkenny, Ireland
- Occupation: Farmer

Sport
- Sport: Hurling
- Position: Centre-back
Club
- Years: Club
- Mooncoin
Inter-county
- Years: County
- 1909: Kilkenny
Inter-county titles
- Leinster titles: 1
- All-Irelands: 1

William Hennebery (1 May 1888 – 16 February 1965) was an Irish hurler. Usually lining out as a centre-back, he was a member of the Kilkenny team that won the 1909 All-Ireland Championship.

Hennebery played his club hurling with Mooncoin, however, he enjoyed little in terms of championship success during his brief career.

After first being selected for the Kilkenny senior team in 1909, Hennebery was a regular member of the team for that championship seasons. He won a Leinster medal that year before later winning his sole All-Ireland medal after Kilkenny's defeat of Tipperary in the final.

Hennebery died after a short illness on 16 February 1965.

== Honours ==
Kilkenny

- All-Ireland Senior Hurling Championship (1): 1909
- Leinster Senior Hurling Championship (1): 1909
