= Billy Goh =

Billy Goh Piak Chiang served as the Assistant Chief Commissioner, Executive Director and International Commissioner of the Singapore Scout Association.

In 1997, Goh was awarded the 257th Bronze Wolf, the only distinction of the World Organization of the Scout Movement, awarded by the World Scout Committee for exceptional services to world Scouting.
