= Billy Bootle =

English footballer

Personal information
- Full name: William Bootle
- Date of birth: 9 January 1926
- Place of birth: Ashton-under-Lyne, England
- Date of death: 10 August 2012 (aged 86)
- Place of death: Urmston, Greater Manchester, England
- Position: Winger

Senior career*
Years	Team	Apps	(Gls)
1946–1950	Manchester City	5	(0)
1950–1952	Wigan Athletic	76	(31)
1954–1955	Crewe Alexandra	14	(4)
- * Club domestic league appearances and goals

William Bootle (9 January 1926 – 10 August 2012) was a footballer who played as a winger in the Football League for Manchester City and Crewe Alexandra. He also played for Wigan Athletic in the Lancashire Combination, scoring 31 goals in 76 league appearances.
