= Billy Monagle =

Australian rules footballer

Personal information
- Full name: William David Monagle
- Born: 26 November 1876; Port Melbourne, Victoria
- Died: 28 February 1941 (aged 64); Prahran, Victoria
- Original team: Port Melbourne

Playing career^{1}
Years	Club	Games (Goals)
1899	Carlton	17 (0)
- ^{1} Playing statistics correct to the end of 1899.

Billy Monagle (26 November 1876 – 28 February 1941) was an Australian rules footballer who played with Carlton in the Victorian Football League (VFL).
