= Billy Poyntz =

Welsh footballer

Personal information
- Full name: William Ivor Poyntz
- Date of birth: 18 March 1894
- Place of birth: Tylorstown, Wales
- Date of death: 1966 (aged 71–72)
- Position: Inside forward

Senior career*
| Years | Team | Apps | (Gls) |
| 1919–1920 | Gorseinon United | | |
| 1920–1921 | Llanelly | | |
| 1921–1923 | Leeds United | 29 | (7) |
| 1923–1924 | Doncaster Rovers | 29 | (10) |
| 1924–1925 | Northampton Town | 29 | (4) |
| 1925–1926 | Bradford (Park Avenue) | 33 | (5) |
| 1926–1927 | Crewe Alexandra | 10 | (1) |
| 1927–1928 | Hartlepools United | 31 | (0) |
| Total | | 161 | (27) |
- * Club domestic league appearances and goals

William Ivor Poyntz (18 March 1894–1966) was a Welsh footballer who played in the Football League for Bradford (Park Avenue), Crewe Alexandra, Doncaster Rovers, Hartlepools United, Leeds United and Northampton Town.
