= Billy Probert =

English footballer (1893–1948)

Personal information
- Full name: William Henry Probert
- Date of birth: 15 January 1893
- Place of birth: Worksop, England
- Date of death: 1948 (aged 54–55)
- Position: Full-back

Senior career*
Years	Team	Apps	(Gls)
1910–1911	Kilton Rovers		
1911–1913	Portsmouth		
1913–1915	Southend United		
1920–1925	Portsmouth	176	(0)
1925–1927	Fulham	16	(0)
1927	Emsworth		
Total		192	(0)
- * Club domestic league appearances and goals

William Henry Probert (15 January 1893 – 1948) was an English footballer who played in the Football League for Fulham and Portsmouth.
