= Billy Troughear =

English footballer

Personal information
- Date of birth: 19 March 1885
- Place of birth: Workington, England
- Date of death: 15 October 1955 (aged 70)
- Place of death: Whitehaven, Cumberland
- Position: Right back

Senior career*
Years	Team	Apps	(Gls)
- Workington Marsh Mission
- Workington
1909–1914	Sunderland	100	(0)
1914–1915	Leicester Fosse	15	(0)
–	Flimby Rangers		
–	Workington		
- * Club domestic league appearances and goals

William B. Troughear (19 March 1885 – 15 October 1955) was an English footballer who played for Sunderland and Leicester Fosse in the English Football League. He played as a right back.

== Life and career ==
Troughear was born in Workington, Cumberland, in 1885, to Joseph and Emily Troughear. He played football for local clubs Workington Marsh Mission and Workington before signing for Sunderland in 1909. He made his debut in the Football League First Division on 6 November 1909 against Blackburn Rovers in a 0–0 draw at Ewood Park. Troughear made 100 league appearances for Sunderland without scoring, and moved on to Second Division club Leicester Fosse for the 1914–15 season. He later played for Flimby Rangers before returning to Workington. He died in 1955.
