= Billy Ward =

Billy Ward may refer to:

- Billy Ward (singer) (1921–2002), American singer with Billy Ward and His Dominoes
- Billy Ward (boxer) (1993–2013), Australian boxer
- Billy Ward (rugby league) (fl. 1888–1921), English rugby league footballer of the 1900s, 1910s and 1920s
