= Billy Humphreys =

English footballer

Personal information
- Full name: William Thomas Humphreys
- Date of birth: 1884
- Place of birth: Bolton, England
- Height: 5 ft 8 1/2 in (1.74 m)
- Position: Wing half

Senior career*
Years	Team	Apps	(Gls)
1904–1905	Chorley		
1905–1915	Bury	240	(1)
1919	Barrow		
Total		240	(1)
- * Club domestic league appearances and goals

William Thomas Humphreys (1884–unknown) was an English footballer who played in the Football League for Bury.
