= Billy Purvis =

Billy Purvis may refer to two different musicians and performers from Tyneside, England:

- Billy Purvis (1832), a blind street entertainer
- Billy Purvis (1853), a traveling showman and piper
