= Billy Bob =

Billy Bob is the given name or nickname of:

== People ==
- Billy Bob Buttons, the pen name of Edward Hugh Trayer (born 1970), British-born novelist
- Billy Bob Faulkingham (William Faulkingham), American politician from 2018
- Billy Bob Thornton (born 1955), American film actor, writer and director

== Fictional characters ==
- Billy Bob Brockali, member of the animatronic robot band the Rock-afire Explosion, voiced by Aaron Fechter

== See also ==
- "Hello, Billy Bob", a song by Jon Batiste on the 2023 album World Music Radio
