= Billy McEwan =

Billy McEwan may refer to:

- Billy McEwan (footballer, born 1914) (1914–1991), Scottish footballer
- Billy McEwan (footballer, born 1951) (1951–2022), Scottish footballer and manager
