= Billy Hickling =

English footballer

Personal information
- Full name: William Hickling
- Place of birth: England
- Position: Full back

Senior career*
Years	Team	Apps	(Gls)
1902–1903	Somercotes United		
1903	Ashby Albion		
1903–1904	Derby County	9	(0)
1905	Tottenham Hotspur	1	(0)
1906–1907	Middlesbrough	5	(0)
1907	Mansfield Mechanics		
1908	Ilkeston United		
Total		14	(0)
- * Club domestic league appearances and goals

William Hickling was an English footballer who played in the Football League for Derby County, and Middlesbrough.
