= Billy Costello =

Billy Costello may refer to:

- Billy Costello (actor) (1898–1971), American actor
- Billy Costello (boxer) (1956–2011), American boxer
