= Billy Booth =

Billy Booth may refer to:

- Billy Booth (actor) (1949–2006), American child actor on the sitcom Dennis the Menace
- Billy Joe Booth (1940–1972), Canadian football player in the Canadian Football League
- Billy Booth (footballer) (1886–1963), English football centre half
