= Billy McGhie =

Billy McGhie may refer to:

- Billy McGhie (footballer, born 1958), Scottish professional footballer
- Billy McGhie (footballer, born 1961), Scottish professional footballer and manager
