= Billy Hedderman =

Irish Army officer

- Born: County Cork, Ireland
- Military career
- Branch: Irish Army; Australian Army
- Service years: 2001–2014 (Ireland); 2014–2020 (Australia)
- Rank: Captain
- Unit: Army Ranger Wing

Billy Hedderman is an ex Army officer who has served in the Irish Defence Forces and in the Australian Defence Force. He is a recovered quadriplegic, author and speaker.

Hedderman served for 13 years in the Irish Army, including 3 years as a platoon commander within the elite Army Ranger Wing special operations force, having passed ARW Selection as a young officer. His overseas deployments with the Irish Army included Chad and Bosnia. He moved to an Australian Army infantry unit as a captain in a "lateral transfer" process in 2014.

On New Year's Eve 2014 Hedderman suffered a surfing accident in which he broke his neck, back and suffered immediate spinal cord damage, which paralysed him from the neck down. He documented his road to recovering from paralysis in the book Unbowed: A Soldier's Journey Back from Paralysis.
