= Billy Winn =

Billy Winn may refer to:

- Billy Winn (racing driver) (1909–1938), American racing driver
- Billy Winn (American football) (born 1989), American former NFL player
- William Winn (1945–2006), American educational psychologist and professor
