= Billy Joy =

English footballer

Personal information
- Full name: William Joseph Joy
- Date of birth: 20 June 1863
- Place of birth: Liverpool, England
- Date of death: 1947 (aged 83–84)
- Position: Goalkeeper

Senior career*
Years	Team	Apps	(Gls)
1895–1896	Preston North End	9	(0)
1896–1897	Blackburn Rovers	3	(0)
1897–1899	Darwen	2	(0)
Total		14	(0)
- * Club domestic league appearances and goals

William Joseph Joy (20 June 1863 – 1947) was an English footballer who played in the Football League for Blackburn Rovers, Darwen and Preston North End.
