= Billy Hardy =

Billy Hardy may refer to:

- Billy Hardy (footballer) (1891–1981), English footballer and football manager
- Billy Hardy (boxer) (born 1964), British boxer

== See also ==
- Bill Hardy
