= Billy Halsall =

English footballer (1897–1968)

Personal information
- Full name: William Halsall
- Date of birth: 2 May 1897
- Place of birth: Birkdale, England
- Date of death: 1968 (aged 70–71)
- Position: Goalkeeper

Senior career*
Years	Team	Apps	(Gls)
1913–1914	Lyndhurst		
1914–1915	Birkdale Working Lads		
1920–1931	Southport	334	(0)
Total		334	(0)
- * Club domestic league appearances and goals

William Halsall (2 May 1897 – 1968) was an English footballer who played in the Football League for Southport.
