= Billy Curley =

English footballer

Personal information
- Date of birth: 20 November 1945 (age 80)
- Place of birth: Trimdon, England
- Position: Full back

Youth career
- 1961–1962: Darlington

Senior career*
Years	Team	Apps	(Gls)
1962–1965	Darlington	29	(1)
- * Club domestic league appearances and goals

William Curley (born 20 November 1945) is an English former footballer who made 29 appearances in the Football League playing as a full back for Darlington in the 1960s. He played for Durham Schools' under-15 team in the 1960–61 season, and was the first player to be taken on by Darlington as an apprentice professional under the scheme introduced in 1960.
