= Billy Compton =

English footballer

Personal information
- Full name: William Alfred Compton
- Date of birth: 5 April 1896
- Place of birth: Bedminster, England
- Date of death: 1976 (aged 79–80)
- Position: Winger

Senior career*
Years	Team	Apps	(Gls)
1913–1914	Victoria Albion		
1914–1915	Gloucester Regiment		
1918–1919	Bristol Motor Works		
1919–1924	Bristol City	14	(0)
1924–1928	Exeter City	151	(39)
1928–1929	Bristol Rovers	22	(4)
1929–1930	Bath City		
Total		187	(43)
- * Club domestic league appearances and goals

William Alfred Compton (5 April 1896 – 1976) was an English footballer who played in the Football League for Bristol City, Bristol Rovers and Exeter City.
