= Billy Rankin =

Billy Rankin may refer to:

- Billy Rankin (drummer) English drummer of the 1960s and 1970s, noted for his work with Brinsley Schwarz and others
- Billy Rankin (guitarist) (born 1959), Scottish guitarist noted for his work with the band Nazareth
