= Billy Wilton =

Australian rules footballer

Personal information
- Full name: William Henry Wilton
- Born: 17 March 1889; Geelong, Victoria
- Died: 22 February 1966 (aged 76); Geelong, Victoria
- Original team: Ocean Grove

Playing career^{1}
Years	Club	Games (Goals)
1908–09, 1914	Geelong	20 (8)
- ^{1} Playing statistics correct to the end of 1914.

William Henry Wilton (17 March 1889 – 22 February 1966) was an Australian rules footballer who played with Geelong in the Victorian Football League (VFL).
