= Billy Arnott =

Australian rules footballer

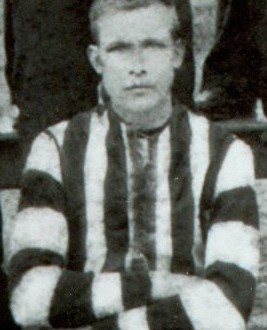
- Arnott in 1895 during his Collingwood VFA career

Personal information
- Full name: William Henry Arnott
- Born: 7 April 1873; Harcourt, Victoria
- Died: 18 May 1962 (aged 89); Brisbane, Queensland
- Original team: Collingwood (VFA)

Playing career^{1}
Years	Club	Games (Goals)
1893	Richmond (VFA)	2 (0)
1895–6	Collingwood (VFA)	36 (2)
1897	Carlton	1 (0)
- ^{1} Playing statistics correct to the end of 1897.

William Henry Arnott (7 April 1873 – 18 May 1962) was an Australian rules footballer who played with Carlton in the Victorian Football League (VFL).
