= Billy Barker (footballer, born 1883) =

English footballer

Personal information
- Full name: William Clement Barker
- Date of birth: 1883
- Place of birth: Linthorpe, England
- Date of death: 1937 (aged 53–54)
- Position: Wing half

Senior career*
Years	Team	Apps	(Gls)
1904–1905	South Bank		
1905–1913	Middlesbrough	105	(1)
Total		105	(1)
- * Club domestic league appearances and goals

William Clement Barker (1883–1937) was an English footballer who played in the Football League for Middlesbrough.
