= Billy Teare =

Irish storyteller and comedian (1951–2026)

William Hume Teare (5 April 1951 – 4 September 2026) was an Irish storyteller. Originally from Ballycarry, he resided for many years in Larne, County Antrim, Northern Ireland. He appeared on radio, stage, television and film.

== Life and career ==
From his teens, Teare began a career on the Belfast stand up comedy circuit, and entered a number of talent shows, winning several, and performing throughout Northern Ireland, as well as gigs in Scotland and England, into the 1990s.

For 50 years, he told stories in hundreds of early years settings, schools, libraries, community groups, council and cultural venues, as well as being a featured artist at many of the major folk and storytelling festivals around the world, including the far reaches of the Yukon. He incorporated songs, music, magic, juggling and other theatrical skills, to enliven a multi cultural feast of original, modern and traditional tales, monologues, rhymes, chants and audience participation. Teare worked collaboratively with various other artists and groups, including BBC Northern Ireland and the Verbal Arts Centre, Derry.

Among his appearances were: Storyteller in Residence, International Storytelling Centre, Tennessee, 2008, BBC Folk Proms event 2008, return performance at the Yukon International Storytelling Festival (2000, 2001, 2006), Beyond the Border: The Wales International Storytelling Festival (2005), The Toronto International Storytelling Festival, Sidmouth International Folk Festival (1999, 2001, 2003).

Teare died on 4 September 2026, at the age of 75.

== Publication ==
In 2013 Teare co-wrote a volume of 'Antrim Folk Tales' with Kathleen O'Sullivan, his storytelling partner for over twenty years. The book was published by The History Press, Ireland. In 2020 stories from the book were included in 'The Anthology of Irish Folk Tales' also published by The History Press.
