= Billy Exley =

English footballer

Personal information
- Full name: William Exley
- Date of birth: 2 May 1924
- Place of birth: Bradford, England
- Date of death: April 1997 (aged 72–73)
- Place of death: Bradford, England
- Position: Goalkeeper

Senior career*
Years	Team	Apps	(Gls)
1952–1953	Bradford City	2	(0)
- Goole Town
Total		2	(0)
- * Club domestic league appearances and goals

William Exley (2 May 1924 – April 1997) was an English professional footballer who played as a goalkeeper.

== Career ==
Born in Bradford, Exley played for Bradford City and Goole Town.

For Bradford City he made 2 appearances in the Football League.

== Sources ==
- Frost, Terry (1988). Bradford City A Complete Record 1903-1988. Breedon Books Sport. ISBN 0-907969-38-0.
- Hugman, Barry (1981). Football League Players Records (1946–1981). Aylesbury: Rothmans Publications. ISBN 0-907574-08-4.}
