= Billy Becher =

Irish cricketer

William Fane Wrixon Becher (7 September 1915 – 6 January 2000) was an Irish cricketer active from 1939 to 1953 who played for Sussex. He was born in Limerick and died in Brighton. He appeared in three first-class matches as a righthanded batsman who scored 48 runs with a highest score of 20.
