= Billy Wayne =

Billy Wayne may refer to:

- Billy Wayne Bailey (1957–2023), American politician
- Billy Wayne Posey, American convicted of the Murders of Chaney, Goodman, and Schwerner
- Billy Wayne Ruddick, in the US political satire mockumentary-style TV series Who Is America?, played by Sacha Baron Cohen
