= Billy Leahy =

Australian rules footballer, born 1911

Personal information
- Full name: William Francis Roy Leahy
- Born: 7 March 1911; Victoria, Australia
- Died: 3 March 1978 (aged 66); Rhodesia
- Original team: Coburg
- Height: 178 cm (5 ft 10 in)
- Weight: 73 kg (161 lb)
- Position: Centre

Playing career^{1}
Years	Club	Games (Goals)
1934–36	Footscray	40 (22)
- ^{1} Playing statistics correct to the end of 1936.

William Francis Roy Leahy (7 March 1911 – 3 March 1978) was an Australian rules footballer who played with Footscray in the Victorian Football League (VFL).
