= Billy Harper (footballer, born 1877) =

English footballer

Personal information
- Full name: William E. Harper
- Date of birth: 1 December 1877
- Place of birth: Nechells, England
- Date of death: 1947 (aged 69–70)
- Position: Winger

Senior career*
Years	Team	Apps	(Gls)
1899–1900	Smethwick Wesleyan Rovers		
1901–1903	West Bromwich Albion	8	(1)
1903–1904	Leicester Fosse	4	(0)
1904	Stourbridge		
Total		12	(1)
- * Club domestic league appearances and goals

William E. Harper (1 December 1877–1947) was an English footballer who played in the Football League for Leicester Fosse and West Bromwich Albion.
