= Billy Brewer (disambiguation) =

Billy Brewer (1935–2018) was an American football player and head coach.

Billy Brewer may also refer to:

- Billy Brewer (baseball) (born 1968), American baseball pitcher
- Billy Brewer (footballer) (1893–1914), English footballer
- Homer Brewer (1934–2018), American football safety, nicknamed Billy
