= Billy Brick =

Irish hurler

Personal information
- Born: Kilmoyley, County Kerry
- Height: 6 ft (1.8 m)

Sport
- Sport: Hurling
- Position: Forward
Club
- Years: Club
- Kilmoyley
Club titles
- Kerry titles: 4
Inter-county
Years	County	Apps (scores)
2002-	Kerry	12(3-09)
Inter-county titles
- Munster titles: 0
- All-Irelands: 0

Billy Brick is a hurler from County Kerry, Ireland.
