= Billy Gambetta =

Australian rules footballer

Personal information
- Full name: William Francis Gambetta
- Born: 6 April 1897; Eaglehawk, Victoria
- Died: 26 July 1957 (aged 60); Ardrossan, South Australia
- Original team: Sandhurst

Playing career^{1}
Years	Club	Games (Goals)
1921–22	Hawthorn (VFA)	18 (45)
1922	South Melbourne	4 (7)
1929	Yarraville (VFA)	4 (8)
- ^{1} Playing statistics correct to the end of 1929.

William Francis Gambetta (6 April 1897 – 26 July 1957) was an Australian rules footballer who played with South Melbourne in the Victorian Football League (VFL).
