= Billy Hagan =

Billy Hagan may refer to:

- Billy Hagan (racing driver) (1932–2007), American NASCAR owner and driver
- Billy Hagan (burlesque) (1889–1986), American burlesque comedian
