= Billy Stack =

English footballer

Personal information
- Full name: William John Stack
- Date of birth: 17 January 1948 (age 78)
- Place of birth: Liverpool, England
- Position: Left winger

Youth career
- Harrow Town
- 1964–1965: Crystal Palace

Senior career*
Years	Team	Apps	(Gls)
1965–1967	Crystal Palace	2	(0)
- Chelmsford City
- Dover
- * Club domestic league appearances and goals

William John Stack (born 17 January 1948) is an English former footballer who played as a left winger.

== Career ==
In January 1965, Stack graduated from Crystal Palace's youth system, after joining from Harrow Town in 1964. In two seasons at the club, Stack made two Football League appearances before joining Chelmsford City. Stack later played for Dover.
