= Billy Sage =

English footballer

Personal information
- Full name: William Sage
- Date of birth: 11 November 1893
- Place of birth: Edmonton, England
- Date of death: 1968 (aged 74–75)
- Height: 5 ft 10 in (1.78 m)
- Position: Right half

Youth career
- Tottenham Thursday

Senior career*
Years	Team	Apps	(Gls)
- Corinthian
1919–1925	Tottenham Hotspur	12	(0)
1927	Clapton Orient	12	(0)
- Dartford
- * Club domestic league appearances and goals

William Sage (11 November 1893 – 1968) was an English professional footballer who played for Tottenham Thursday, Corinthian, Tottenham Hotspur, Clapton Orient and Dartford.

== Football career ==
Sage began his playing career at youth team Tottenham Thursday before playing for Corinthians. The right half joined Tottenham Hotspur in 1919 and made 12 appearances for the "Spurs". Sage was chosen as a member of the British FA X1 which toured South Africa in 1920. After leaving White Hart Lane he played for Clapton Orient and finally Dartford.
