= Billy McGinty =

Billy McGinty may refer to:

- Billy McGinty (rugby league), British rugby league footballer
- Billy McGinty (cowboy) (1871–1961), American bronco buster and one of Theodore Roosevelt's Rough Riders in the Spanish–American War
