= Billy Barham =

Australian rules footballer

Personal information
- Full name: William Barham
- Born: 7 April 1952 (age 74)
- Original team: Hamilton
- Height: 178 cm (5 ft 10 in)
- Weight: 73 kg (161 lb)

Playing career^{1}
Years	Club	Games (Goals)
1974–75	Melbourne	12 (14)
- ^{1} Playing statistics correct to the end of 1975.

William Barham (born 7 April 1952) is a former Australian rules footballer who played with Melbourne in the Victorian Football League (VFL).
