= Billy Stephens =

Australian rules footballer, born 1918

Personal information
- Full name: Billy Stephens
- Born: 28 July 1918
- Died: 16 September 2006 (aged 88)
- Original team: Geelong Seconds / Geelong District
- Height: 180 cm (5 ft 11 in)
- Weight: 79 kg (174 lb)

Playing career^{1}
Years	Club	Games (Goals)
1937–38	Footscray	7 (5)
- ^{1} Playing statistics correct to the end of 1938.

Billy Stephens (28 July 1918 – 16 September 2006) was an Australian rules footballer who played with Footscray in the Victorian Football League (VFL).
