= Billy Sothern =

American lawyer (1977–2022)

Billy Sothern (February 15, 1977 – September 30, 2022) was an American lawyer. He specialized in capital defense. He represented Albert Woodfox of the Angola 3 and numerous other high profile defendants.

He was the author of the 2007 book Down in New Orleans: Reflections from a Drowned City.
