= Billy Rowesome =

Irish hurler

Billy Rowsome
Personal information
- Born: 1956 (age 69–70) Monageer, County Wexford
- Height: 5 ft 10 in (178 cm)

Sport
- Sport: Hurling
- Position: Midfield
Club
- Years: Club
- 1970s-1990s: Monageer/Boolavogue
Inter-county
- Years: County
- 1970s-1980s: Wexford
Inter-county titles
- Leinster titles: 2
- All-Irelands: 0
- NFL: 0
- All Stars: 0

Billy Rowsome (born 1956 in Monageer, County Wexford) was an Irish sportsperson. He played hurling with his local club Monageer and was a member of the Wexford senior inter-county team in the 1970s and 1980s.
