= Billy Plunkett =

Australian rules footballer (1914–1960)

Personal information
- Full name: William Gabriel Plunkett
- Born: 2 May 1914; Geelong, Victoria
- Died: 21 July 1960 (aged 46); Geelong West, Victoria
- Height: 183 cm (6 ft 0 in)
- Weight: 73 kg (161 lb)

Playing career^{1}
Years	Club	Games (Goals)
1935	Geelong	8 (22)
1940	Port Melbourne (VFA)	11 (12)
- ^{1} Playing statistics correct to the end of 1940.

William Gabriel Plunkett (2 May 1914 – 21 July 1960) was an Australian rules footballer who played with Geelong in the Victorian Football League (VFL).

After playing with Geelong in 1935, Plunkett returned to Geelong District football for a few years before reappearing in senior ranks with Port Melbourne in 1940.

Plunkett later served in the Australian Army during World War II.
