= Billy McLauchlan =

Scottish footballer

Personal information
- Date of birth: 25 September 1950
- Place of birth: Scotland
- Date of death: May 1972 (aged 21)
- Place of death: East Wemyss, Scotland
- Position: Right back

Senior career*
Years	Team	Apps	(Gls)
–1967	Greig Park Rangers		
1967–1972	Cowdenbeath	128	(1)
–1968	→ Jubilee Athletic (loan)		
- * Club domestic league appearances and goals

Billy McLaughlan (25 September 1950 – May 1972) was a Scottish football right back who played in the Scottish League for Cowdenbeath.

== Personal life ==
At the age of just 21, McLauchlan died of accidental electrocution in an accident at home.

== Honours ==
Cowdenbeath

- Scottish League Second Division second-place promotion: 1969–70

Individual

- Cowdenbeath Hall of Fame
