= Billy Nicolle =

New Zealand footballer

Personal information
- Full name: William J Nicolle
- Place of birth: New Zealand

Senior career*
Years	Team	Apps	(Gls)
- Wellington YMCA

International career
1927	New Zealand	1	(0)
- * Club domestic league appearances and goals

William Nicolle is a former association football player who represented New Zealand at international level.

Nicolle made a single appearance in an official international for the All Whites in a 1–0 win over Canada on 9 July 1927.
