= Billy Dale =

Billy Dale may refer to:

- Billy Dale (footballer) (born 1925), English soccer player
- Billy Dale, American White House employee acquitted of criminal charges in 1995
