= Billy Rooks =

English footballer (1890–1972)

Personal information
- Full name: William Rooks
- Date of birth: 14 December 1890
- Place of birth: Sunderland, England
- Date of death: 1972 (aged 81–82)
- Height: 5 ft 7 in (1.70 m)
- Position: Wing half

Senior career*
Years	Team	Apps	(Gls)
1911–1912	Willington		
1912–1913	Sunderland Rovers		
1913–1922	Blackpool	103	(4)
1922–1927	Accrington Stanley	132	(4)
1927–1928	Hurst		
1928	Great Harwood		
Total		235	(8)
- * Club domestic league appearances and goals

William Rooks (14 December 1890 – 1972) was an English footballer who played in the Football League for Accrington Stanley and Blackpool.
