= Billy Layton =

English footballer

Personal information
- Full name: George William Layton
- Date of birth: 28 June 1882
- Place of birth: Shrewsbury, England
- Date of death: 1946 (aged 63–64)
- Position: Inside forward

Senior career*
Years	Team	Apps	(Gls)
1903–1904	Shrewsbury Town		
1904–1906	Wolverhampton Wanderers	29	(4)
1906–1907	Coventry City		
1907–1908	Wolverhampton Swifts		
1908	Willenhall Pickwick		
Total		29	(4)
- * Club domestic league appearances and goals

George William Layton (28 June 1882–1946) was an English footballer who played in the Football League for Wolverhampton Wanderers.
