= Billy Milne (footballer, born 1873) =

English footballer and cricketer

Personal information
- Full name: William Milne
- Date of birth: 1873
- Place of birth: Newcastle upon Tyne, England
- Date of death: 10 January 1951 (aged 77–78)
- Place of death: Newcastle upon Tyne, England
- Position: Outside left

Senior career*
Years	Team	Apps	(Gls)
- Bedlington
- Science & Art
- Rutherford College
1894–1895	Newcastle United	5	(1)
1895–1897	Sunderland	0	(0)
1897	Newcastle United	1	(0)
Total		6	(1)
- * Club domestic league appearances and goals

William Milne (1873 – 10 January 1951) was an English amateur footballer and minor counties cricketer.

Milne was born at Newcastle upon Tyne. He began his career with Bedlington, Science & Art and Rutherford College. He had a brief professional football career, making six appearances in the Football League for Newcastle United between 1894 and 1897. He had two spells at Newcastle, separated by a brief spell at Sunderland.

Milne also played cricket at minor counties level for Northumberland, albeit intermittently, from 1896 to 1908, making nineteen appearances in the Minor Counties Championship. Outside of his sporting life, Milne worked for the Newcastle Corporation's Health Department for 44 years, as well as being one of the founders of the Newcastle Society of Artists. He died at Newcastle upon Tyne in January 1951.
