= Billy Copeland =

Scottish cricketer

Billy Copeland (1856 – 28 January 1917) was a Scottish cricketer. He was a left-arm medium-pace bowler who played first-class cricket for Lancashire. He was born in Coatbridge and died in South Shields.

Having played one game for Glasgow and District in 1880, Copeland waited two years before his debut game for Durham in 1882. He made nearly 15 appearances for the team between this date and his first and only first-class appearance, for Lancashire, against Yorkshire, in 1885.

Copeland scored 21 runs in the first innings of the match, and a duck in the second innings, taking a single wicket with the ball - that of Yorkshire captain Louis Hall.

Between 1885 and 1894, Copeland made more than 15 further appearances for Durham, who, for the ensuing 98 years, would remain a non-County Championship side.
