= Morndi Munro =

Last fluent speaker of the Unggumi language

Morndi or Billy Munro was the last fluent speaker of the Unggumi language of Western Australia.
