= Billy Blake =

English footballer

Personal information
- Date of birth: 1902
- Place of birth: Worcester, England
- Position: Defender

Senior career*
Years	Team	Apps	(Gls)
?–1924	Kidderminster Harriers	?	(?)
1924–1926	Crystal Palace	34	(0)
1926–?	Kidderminster Harriers	?	(?)
- * Club domestic league appearances and goals

William H. Blake (1902 – ) was an English professional footballer who played in the Football League for Crystal Palace, as a defender. He also played non-league football for Kidderminster Harriers.

== Playing career ==
Blake was born in Worcester, England and spent his early career with Kidderminster Harriers, then playing in the local Birmingham and District League. In March 1924, he signed for Crystal Palace of the Football League Third Division South. He made his debut on 16 November in an away 0–3 defeat to Port Vale, playing at left back. However, he did not make another appearance until February 1925, after which he was ever present, at right back, for the remainder of the 1924–5 season, playing 16 times in total. In 1925–6, Blake began the season at right back and missed only one of the first 17 games before being replaced by regular full back Jack Little. He played a further two games at the end of the season, before returning to Kidderminster in the 1925–6 close season, having made a total of 34 senior appearances for Palace.
