= Billy Goodhew =

English cricketer

William Goodhew (24 May 1828 – 1 May 1897), known as Billy Goodhew, was an English professional cricketer who played first-class cricket for Kent and several other teams in the period between 1854 and 1866. He was born at Chislehurst in Kent in 1828.

Goodhew was a right-handed batsman and an infrequent right-arm bowler who bowled in the round arm style. At his death, Wisden Cricketers' Almanack wrote of him: "Without ever being in the front rank of professional cricketers, Goodhew was a very fair bat and rendered useful service to Kent at a time when the fortunes of the county were at rather a low ebb." His best innings was a score of 70 out of a total of just 132 when opening the Kent batting against Sussex in 1862. As a bowler, his best return came when playing for Gentlemen of Kent – although he was a professional – against Gentlemen of England in 1858, when he took seven first-innings wickets for 40 runs. In addition to 69 first-class matches for Kent, he played for county combinations involving Kent with Sussex, Surrey and Nottinghamshire and for the South in the North v South matches.

After his playing career was over, Goodhew was used by Kent as an umpire in first-class matches from 1876 to 1882. He died in 1897 at Canterbury aged 68.

== Bibliography ==
- Carlaw, Derek (2020). Kent County Cricketers, A to Z: Part One (1806–1914) (PDF). Cardiff: ACS.
