= Billy the Bee =

British newspaper comic strip

Billy the Bee drawn by Harry Smith c.1950

Billy the Bee, was a UK newspaper comic strip created by the cartoonist Harry Smith. It ran in the 1950s in The Evening Standard newspaper.

It also ran in a number of Scottish and provincial newspapers.

The Newcastle Evening Chronicle (NEC) carried the strip from 12 July 1954 to 13 June 1962 starting with first strip.

The Aberdeen Evening Express (AEE) also carried the strip from 30 August 1954 to 25 April 1958, again starting from the first strip.

The Western Mail published at least two Billy The Bee stories from 13 August 1959 to sometime in 1960. The first story was 'Billy and the Dodo's Egg' which had appeared earlier in NEC and AEE.

Beaverbrook Newspapers Ltd. collected two stories 'The Day the Worm Turned' and 'Billy and the Beast' and published them as 'Stories of Billy the Bee from the Evening Standard by Harry Smith'.

Billy also appeared in at least 2 Dutch compilation albums as Billy De Bij, published in the early 1960s.
