= Billy Laing =

Scottish footballer

Personal information
- Date of birth: 25 April 1951 (age 75)
- Place of birth: Scotland
- Positions: Centre forward; outside right

Youth career
- –1967: Greig Park Rangers

Senior career*
Years	Team	Apps	(Gls)
1967–1970	Rangers	0	(0)
1970–1975	Cowdenbeath	151	(69)
1975–????	Dunfermline Athletic		
–1976	Lossiemouth		
1976–1978	Berwick Rangers	50	(22)
1978	Brechin City	4	(1)

International career
- Scotland Schoolboys
- * Club domestic league appearances and goals

Billy Laing (born 25 April 1951) is a Scottish retired professional football centre forward who played in the Scottish League for Cowdenbeath, Berwick Rangers, Dunfermline Athletic and Brechin City. He was capped by Scotland at schoolboy level.

== Honours ==
- Cowdenbeath Hall of Fame
