= Billy Beckett (Scottish footballer) =

Former Scottish footballer

Personal information
- Place of birth: Dumbarton, Scotland
- Position: Outside left

Senior career*
Years	Team	Apps	(Gls)
- Renfrew
1951–1954	Rangers	1	(0)
1954–1955	Ashford Town	21	(6)
1955–1957	Cowdenbeath		
1957	Chelmsford City	8	(1)
- * Club domestic league appearances and goals

Billy Beckett was a Scottish footballer who played as an outside left.

== Career ==
Beckett began his career with Scottish junior club Renfrew. In 1951, he signed for Rangers, making his only league appearance on 10 March 1951 in a 4–0 victory against Clyde. Beckett subsequently joined English Kent League club Ashford Town. In 1955, he signed for Scottish club Cowdenbeath where he remained for two seasons, scoring over 20 goals for the club. In August 1957, Beckett signed for Chelmsford City, following offers from Football League clubs Halifax Town, Darlington and Crewe Alexandra. After 13 appearances for Chelmsford, scoring five goals in all competitions, he returned to his native Scotland after failing to secure accommodation in Chelmsford.
