= Billy Nuttall =

English footballer

Personal information
- Full name: William Nuttall
- Date of birth: 7 December 1920
- Place of birth: Preston, Lancashire, England
- Date of death: 4 March 1963 (aged 42)
- Place of death: Preston, Lancashire, England
- Position: Defender

Senior career*
Years	Team	Apps	(Gls)
1946–1947	Preston North End	2	(0)
1948–1951	Barrow	65	(0)
Total		67	(0)
- * Club domestic league appearances and goals

William Nuttall (7 December 1920 – 4 March 1963) was an English footballer who played in the Football League for Barrow and Preston North End. He died in Preston in 1963.
