= William Lee =

William, Will, Bill, or Billy Lee may refer to:

== People ==
=== Entertainment ===
- Bill Lee (singer) (1916–1980), American singer who voiced many Disney characters
- Bill Lee (musician) (1928–2023), American jazz musician
- Bill Lee (author) (born 1954), Chinese-American writer and ex-gang member
- Billy Lee (actor) (1929–1989), American child actor
- Billy Lee, in the beat 'em up video game series Double Dragon
- Bill Lee (Stargate), in the military science fiction adventure TV series Stargate SG-1
- Will Lee (bassist) (born 1952), American bassist on David Letterman show
- Will Lee (1908–1982), American actor and comedian
- Will Yun Lee (born 1971), American actor
- William Franklin Lee III (1929–2011), pianist, dean of Miami School of Music
- William Gregory Lee (born 1973), American actor
- William Lee, pen name used by William S. Burroughs

=== Law ===
- William Lee (American judge), American judge and member of the Alabama State Legislature
- William Lee (English judge) (1688–1754), British judge and MP for Wycombe
- William Little Lee (1821–1857), first chief justice of the Supreme Court for the Kingdom of Hawaii
- William Charles Lee (1938–2024), U.S. federal judge
- William F. Lee (born 1950), co-managing partner of law firm WilmerHale
- Bill Lee (Delaware politician) (born 1935), American lawyer and politician
- Bill Lann Lee (born 1949), Chinese-American civil rights lawyer
- William E. Lee (Idaho judge) (1882–1955), chief justice of the Idaho Supreme Court

=== Military ===
- William Raymond Lee (1807–1891), American Union Civil War soldier
- W. H. F. Lee (William Henry Fitzhugh Lee, 1837–1891), Confederate Army general and US congressman
- William C. Lee (1895–1948), American Army soldier and general
- William A. Lee (1900–1998), American Marine and Navy Cross recipient

=== Politics ===
- William Lee (diplomat) (1739–1795), American diplomat
- William Lee (Australian politician) (1794–1870), New South Wales politician
- William Henry Lee (1799–1878), Canadian clerk of the Privy Council
- William Lee (1801–1881), British member of parliament for Maidstone, 1853–1857 and 1859–1870
- William Scott Lee (1851–1916), mayor of Denver, Colorado, 1887–1889
- William E. Lee (1852–1920), Minnesota politician
- William H. Lee (New York politician) (1876–1954), New York state senator
- Bill Lee (Georgia politician) (1925–2014), American politician from the state of Georgia
- Bill Lee (Delaware politician) (born 1935), American lawyer and politician
- Bill Lee (Canadian politician), Progressive Conservative Party of Canada
- Bill Lee (Tennessee politician) (born 1959), governor of Tennessee

=== Religion ===
- William Lee (bishop, born 1875) (1875–1948), Roman Catholic bishop of Clifton
- William Lee (bishop, born 1941) (1941–2024), Roman Catholic bishop of Waterford and Lismore
- William Lee (priest) (1815–1883), Irish Anglican priest and archdeacon of Dublin

=== Sports ===
- Bill Lee (American football) (1911–1998), American football player
- Bill Lee (left-handed pitcher) (born 1946), American baseball pitcher
- Bill Lee (right-handed pitcher) (1909–1977), American baseball pitcher
- Bill Lee (yacht designer) (born 1942), designer of Merlin 70' Santa Cruz ULDB
- Billy Lee (baseball) (1894–1984), American baseball outfielder
- Billy Lee (English footballer) (1878–1934), English footballer
- Billy Lee (jockey) (born 1986), Irish jockey
- William "Caveman" Lee (born 1956), American middleweight boxer
- William Lee (wrestler) (born 1951), American Olympic wrestler
- Will Lee III (born 2003), American football player
- Billy Lee (Gaelic footballer), Gaelic footballer and manager
- Willie Lee (1950–2017), American football defensive tackle

=== Other people ===
- William Lee (inventor) (c. 1563–1614), inventor of the stocking frame knitting machine
- William Lee (valet) (1750–1828), George Washington's enslaved personal servant
- William Lee (civil engineer) (1812–1891), English biographer and bibliographer of Daniel Defoe
- William Douglas Lee (1894–1965), American architect
- William Ellsworth Lee (1867–1936), American oil businessman
- William H. Lee (publisher) (1936–2019), newspaper publisher
- William H. K. Lee (1940–2022), seismologist
- William Harold Lee (1884–1971), American architect and movie theater designer
- William Mack Lee (1835–1932), American fraudster
- William Poy Lee (born 1951), author and political activist
- William States Lee III (1929–1996), chairman of the board of Duke Power

== Other ==
- Bill Lee (Amtrak station), Chipley, Florida
- William Lee (ship), in the Stone Fleet of the American Civil War
- William Lee (1831 ship), whaler
- William Lee Foundry in Dronfield, England, now Castings plc

== See also ==
- William Lea (disambiguation)
- William Leigh (disambiguation)
- Billy Lee's, a Chinese restaurant in Chinatown, Perth, Western Australia
