= John Henry Phelan =

American oil producer and philanthropist (1877–1957)

John Henry Phelan (December 11, 1877 – May 19, 1957), was an American oil producer and philanthropist. In partnership with Miles Franklin Yount, he worked for the Yount-Lee Oil Company.

After the oil company's success at Spindletop, Yount-Lee was bought in 1935 by Stanolind Oil, when Phelan was treasurer of the firm, a deal the Handbook of Texas calls "the third largest cash transaction in American business history". Before going into oil, he formed the Phelan-Josey Wholesale Company, a regional grocery distributor in Southeast Texas, upon his arrival in Beaumont, Texas in 1902.

Phelan was noted for his philanthropy, especially to Catholic causes. He donated his homestead to the Sisters of Charity of the Incarnate Word and the property is now Christus St. Elizabeth Hospital in Beaumont. Pope Pius XI appointed him a Knight of St. Gregory in 1933 and he received the Laetare Medal from the University of Notre Dame in 1951.

== Personal life ==
One of eleven children born to Patrick Henry Phelan, a wholesale grocer, and Adele (Myers) Phelan, in Charlotte, North Carolina, Phelan worked as a traveling salesman before moving to Beaumont in 1902. Phelan had three children with wife Johanna Cunningham, who he married in 1905. Phelan's great-grandson, Dade Phelan, was elected as Speaker of the Texas House of Representatives in 2021.

== Sources ==
- Phelan, John Henry (1877–1957), Handbook of Texas Online
- JOHN HENRY PHELAN, A TEXAS OIL MAN, 79, New York Times, May 20, 1957
