= Oak Room =

Oak Room may refer to:

== Public function rooms ==
United States

- The Oak Room (Algonquin Hotel), a cabaret nightclub in the Algonquin Hotel in New York City
- The Oak Room (Plaza Hotel), a restaurant in the Plaza Hotel in New York City
- The Oak Room, a function room in the former Greenwich Savings Bank Building in New York City
- The Oak Room, a restaurant in the Copley Plaza Hotel in Boston
- The Oak Room, a restaurant in the Houstonian Hotel in Houston
- The Oak Room, a bar in the Mansions on Fifth Hotel in Pittsburgh
- The Oakroom, a restaurant in the Seelbach Hotel in Louisville
- The Oak Room, a restaurant in the Westin St. Francis in San Francisco
- The Oak Room, a restaurant in the Pala Casino Resort and Spa near San Diego

United Kingdom

- The Oak Room, a restaurant in Le Méridien Piccadilly Hotel in London
- The Oak Room, a performance space in The Hospital Club in London
- The Oak Room, a restaurant in Danesfield House in Buckinghamshire
- The Oak Room, a function room in the Wycombe Swan complex in Buckinghamshire
- The Oak Room Cafe in Curzon Community Cinema, Clevedon in North Somerset

Ireland

- The Oak Room (Adare Manor), a restaurant at Adare Manor in the village of Adare

== Museum rooms and rooms of historical or aesthetic interest ==
United States

- The Oak Room, a state room in Allerton House at Robert Allerton Park in Illinois
- The Oak Room, an Elizabethian-style room in Spindletop Hall in Kentucky

Canada

- The Oak Room (Casa Loma), a room in Casa Loma in Toronto
- The Oak Room, a room in Aberthau House in Vancouver

United Kingdom

- The Oak Dining Room, the King's private dining room in Windsor Castle
- The Oak Room in the Antelope Hotel in Dorchester, Dorset, a site of the Bloody Assizes
- The Great Oak Room, an Elizabethian/Tudor room in the Red Lodge Museum, Bristol
- The Oak Room, an Elizabethian room in Chavenage House in Gloucestershire
- The Oak Room, the early Tudor great hall of Abington Park Manor in Northampton
- The Oak Room, a 17th-century room in New River Head in London
- The Oak Room, a room in Cassiobury House in Hertfordshire
- The Oak Room, a 19th-century room in Norton Hall in Sheffield
- The Oak Room, a room in Scarisbrick Hall in Lancashire featured in the TV series Utopia
- The Oak Room, a room in Winnington Hall in Cheshire
- The Oak Room, a room in The Olde White Harte in Hull where, according to legend, Sir John Hotham and others made the decision precipitating the Siege of Hull
- Oak Hall (formerly the Oak Room), a 19th-century addition to West Dean House in Sussex
- The Oak Room, a room in the Liverpool Central Library
- The Oak Room, a room in Dyffryn House in Dyffryn Gardens in Wales
- The Oak Room, a room in Antrim Castle in Northern Ireland

Ireland

- The Oak Room, a room in Malahide Castle near Dublin
- The Oak Room, a room in Mansion House, Dublin where Nationalist Party factions met on 17 January 1900

== Film and television ==
- The Oak Room (film), a 2020 Canadian film
