= Spindletop, Lexington =

Spindletop
- Neighborhood of Lexington, Kentucky
- Interactive map of Spindletop
- Coordinates: 38.135°N 84.526°W
- Country: United States
- State: Kentucky
- County: Fayette
- City: Lexington

Area
  - Total: 0.321 sq mi (0.83 km^{2})

Population (2000)
  - Total: 126
  - Density: 393/sq mi (152/km^{2})
- Time zone: UTC-5 (Eastern (EST))
  - Summer (DST): UTC-4 (EDT)
- ZIP code: 40511
- Area code: 859

Spindletop is a rural neighborhood north of Lexington, Kentucky, United States. Its boundaries are I-75 to the west and Berea Road to the south and east. It is located just south of the Kentucky Horse Park. It is named for Spindletop hall, a historic mansion once owned by Miles Franklin Yount, which is located within the neighborhood.

== Neighborhood statistics ==
- Area: 0.321 square miles (0.83 km^{2})
- Population: 126
- Population density: 393 people per square mile
- Median household income: $57,604
