= William Lee (ship) =

At least two vessels have been named William Lee:

- William Lee (1831 ship) was launched in 1831 in Hull as a whaler in the British northern whale fishery. She made six whaling voyages. In 1833, she participated in the rescue of the explorer John Ross, and his crew. After the collapse of the whale fishery, her owners sold her in 1836. Under new ownership, she traded more widely, to Russia, Calcutta, and North America. She was wrecked in December 1847.
- William Lee (1836 ship) was a bark of 311 tons (bm), built as a whaler in 1836. She is mentioned in Melville's poem as the Lee. She ended up being sunk in the Stone fleet.
