= William Ellsworth Lee =

American businessman

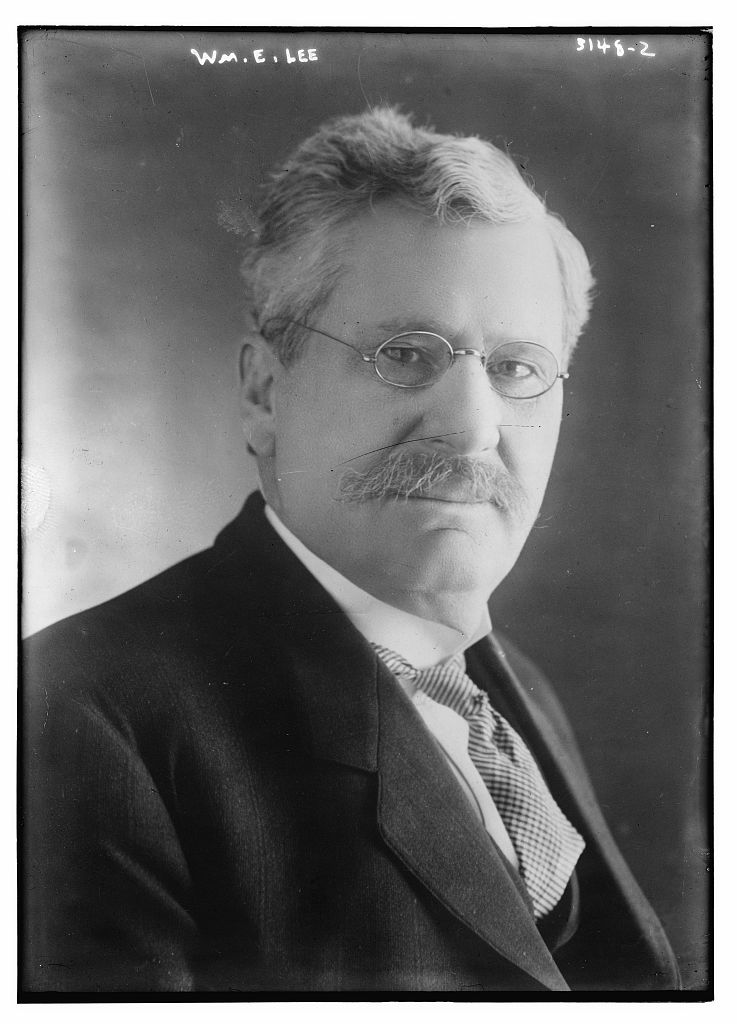
Lee circa 1915

William Ellsworth Lee (January 31, 1867 – October 28, 1936) was an American businessman.

== Biography ==
The brother of Thomas Peter Lee, was born in Petroleum, West Virginia on January 31, 1867. At a very early age, he began working in the oil fields and spent six years with the U. S. Oil Company in West Virginia, before moving to Ohio and then following his brother to Saratoga, Texas in 1904. He married Margaret McGuigan, a native of Parkersburg, on September 8, 1907, and the couple had six children: William Howard, Irene May, Thomas Peter, Faustine Ellen, and the twins, Donald and Ronald.

After working for ten years with the Producers Oil Company, Bill Lee resigned and joined the Texas Company (Texaco), which assigned him to the Sour Lake production division. When T. P. Lee left the Texas Company and vacated the position of general superintendent of production, Bill thought that he might be promoted to that spot, but another got the job. Though thoroughly sickened when things did not work out as planned, he stayed with the company only at the insistence of his brother. Meanwhile, he still sought another area of employment, until finally, he got his wish.

With the formation of the Yount-Lee Oil Company, T. P. Lee gave him a block of stock in the new venture, and this afforded him the opportunity to break away from the oil business. Subsequently, he organized and became president of the Citizens National Bank of Sour Lake, Texas which became one of the most prominent financial institutions in Hardin County.

Bill Lee's grandson, T. P. "Tommy" Lee, III, described his grandfather as a large man weighing about three hundred pounds and with a height of about five feet, eleven inches. He was very affectionate toward all family members, but he was closer to T. P. Lee than all the rest. Portrayed as a "man of extreme wealth with country ways," Bill Lee maintained a vegetable garden, kept various farm animals at his stately Houston home on Montrose Boulevard, and enjoyed spoiling all of his children and grandchildren.

After moving from Sour Lake to Houston, Lee devoted himself to investments. He became a distinguished financier, a member of the River Oaks Country Club, Houston Club, Yacht Club, Mount Olive Lodge No. 3, A. F. and A. M. of Parkersburg, West Virginia, and the Shrine and Knights Templar. Bill Lee lived to be sixty-nine years old, and at the time of his death on October 28, 1936, brought on by bronchial pneumonia, he made his residence at 4218 Montrose Boulevard in Houston. Like his brother, T. P. Lee, Bill is buried at Houston's Glenwood Cemetery.

== Legacy ==
One of Bill's daughters, Faustine, married Glenn Herbert McCarthy, popularly known as "Diamond Glenn", a legendary wildcatter who built the world-famous Shamrock Hotel in Houston. Purportedly, McCarthy, a close friend of Howard Hughes, inspired the character of Jett Rink found in Edna Ferber's best-selling novel Giant. Another of Bill Lee's children, William Howard, married into Hollywood royalty not once but twice: first to actress Hedy Lamarr from December 1953 until the couple divorced in 1960; and then to Gene Tierney in 1960.
