= Emerson Francis Woodward =

American oilman (1879–1943)

- Born: February 23, 1879; Podunk, New York, US
- Died: May 24, 1943 (aged 64); Hondo, Texas, US
- Resting place: Forest Park Cemetery, Houston, Texas
- Occupation(s): Oilman, Racehorse owner & breeder
- Known for: Yount-Lee Oil Company, Valdina Farms
- Spouse: Bessie McGarry
- Children: 1
- Awards: National Trapshooting Hall of Fame (1973); Texas Horse Racing Hall of Fame (2001)

Emerson Francis Woodward (February 23, 1879 – May 24, 1943) was an oilman who co-founded the Yount-Lee Oil Company which made a major discovery at the Spindletop field near Beaumont, Texas. In 1935, Woodward and partners sold the company to Standard Oil & Gas for $46 million.

He was born at Podunk, New York to William W. and Ida May LaGrange Woodward. Because his father made his living in the oil business in its earliest days at Titusville, Pennsylvania, Emerson wanted to follow in his footsteps. After receiving an early education in the Goodwill Hill public schools in Pennsylvania, Woodward, at the age of eleven, went to work in the oil fields, and before the end of his career, he would be affiliated with the industry in various other states, including Oklahoma, Ohio, Arkansas, Louisiana, and Texas. He married Bessie McGarry in 1901 at her hometown of Woodsfield, Ohio. The couple had only one child, a son, Harley E. Woodward, who died at age 34 when the private plane he was in crashed into Rich Mountain, Arkansas.

The Producers Oil Company employed Emerson Woodward for eleven years, and during this stretch, he met his lifelong associate, Thomas Peter Lee, who worked for the same firm. Woodward advanced quickly within the organization and received a promotion to assistant superintendent of its southern division, which encompassed the area from New Orleans to El Paso. Later, he helped organize the Farmers Petroleum Company, held the position of superintendent, and in 1921 became president of the Republic Production Company, a subsidiary of American Republics Corporation. With the formation of the Yount-Lee Oil Company, Woodward eventually became one of its largest stockholders.

== Trapshooting ==
Emerson Woodward, in January 1924, advanced $28,000 to build the Houston Gun Club on Westheimer Road, and he actively participated in his favorite hobby of trapshooting in the company of friends such as Hank A. Hausmann of LaGrange, Texas and Forest McNeir, a fellow Houstonian. His expert marksmanship earned for him places in the National Trapshooting Hall of Fame, which inducted him on August 24, 1973, and in the Texas Trapshooters Association Hall of Fame, which reciprocated in 1983. One of his records "in 1933 … set a yearly ATA (American Trapshooters Association) 16-yard average record of .9950 that was not broken or tied until 1965, some thirty-two years later.

== Valdina Farms ==
After the Yount-Lee sale, Emerson Woodward announced, "Well, I sold the last of my oil interests today. I've got nothing to do but fool with horses." He kept his word, retired from the oil business and spent much of his time occupied with the sport of the kings. During the late 1930s and early 1940s, on his ranch, Valdina Farms, spanning 18,127 acres (73.36 km^{2}) located in both Uvalde and Medina Counties in Texas, hence the name Valdina, he raised, trained, and sent his horses such as Valdina Myth, Valdina Orphan, and Rounders to racetracks all over the country. Called by The New York Times as "one of the largest and most famous racing stables of its time," under trainer Frank Catrone these Thoroughbreds competed head to head with some of the best the American racing world had to offer. Valdina Myth was the 1940 two-year-old-fillies earnings Champion and the 1941 Kentucky Oaks winner. Valdina Orphan, with jockey Carroll Bierman aboard, won 1942 Derby Trial Stakes then ran third in the Kentucky Derby. Irish bred Rounders won several top races in the United States including the 1942 Arlington Handicap in which he beat the great Triple Crown champion, Whirlaway. For his contributions to the industry, the Texas Horse Racing Hall of Fame inducted him as a member in 2001.

== Philanthropy ==
Emerson and his wife were also recognized for their philanthropic accomplishments. According to Jack Meyer, their pastor at the Heights Church of Christ in Houston, "They financed an orphanage in Hope, Arkansas …, built the Church of Christ at College Station, contributed heavily to the Boles Orphans home at Quinlan, Texas. They sent many girls through the Abilene Christian College, paying all their expenses."

== Death ==
An automobile driven by Woodward collided into the side of a train at a grade crossing near D'Hanis, Texas, close to Hondo in Medina County, and the accident claimed both his life and that of his wife, the only other passenger in the vehicle. Bessie Woodward died of injuries on May 22, 1943, and Emerson followed at age sixty-four two days later while a patient at the Medina Hospital in Hondo. A double funeral was held in Houston at Heights Church of Christ, and they were entombed in a mausoleum at the city's Forest Park Cemetery. Their fifteen-year-old grandson, Robert Woodward, would inherit their entire estate.
