= Podunk =

Term that describes an insignificant location

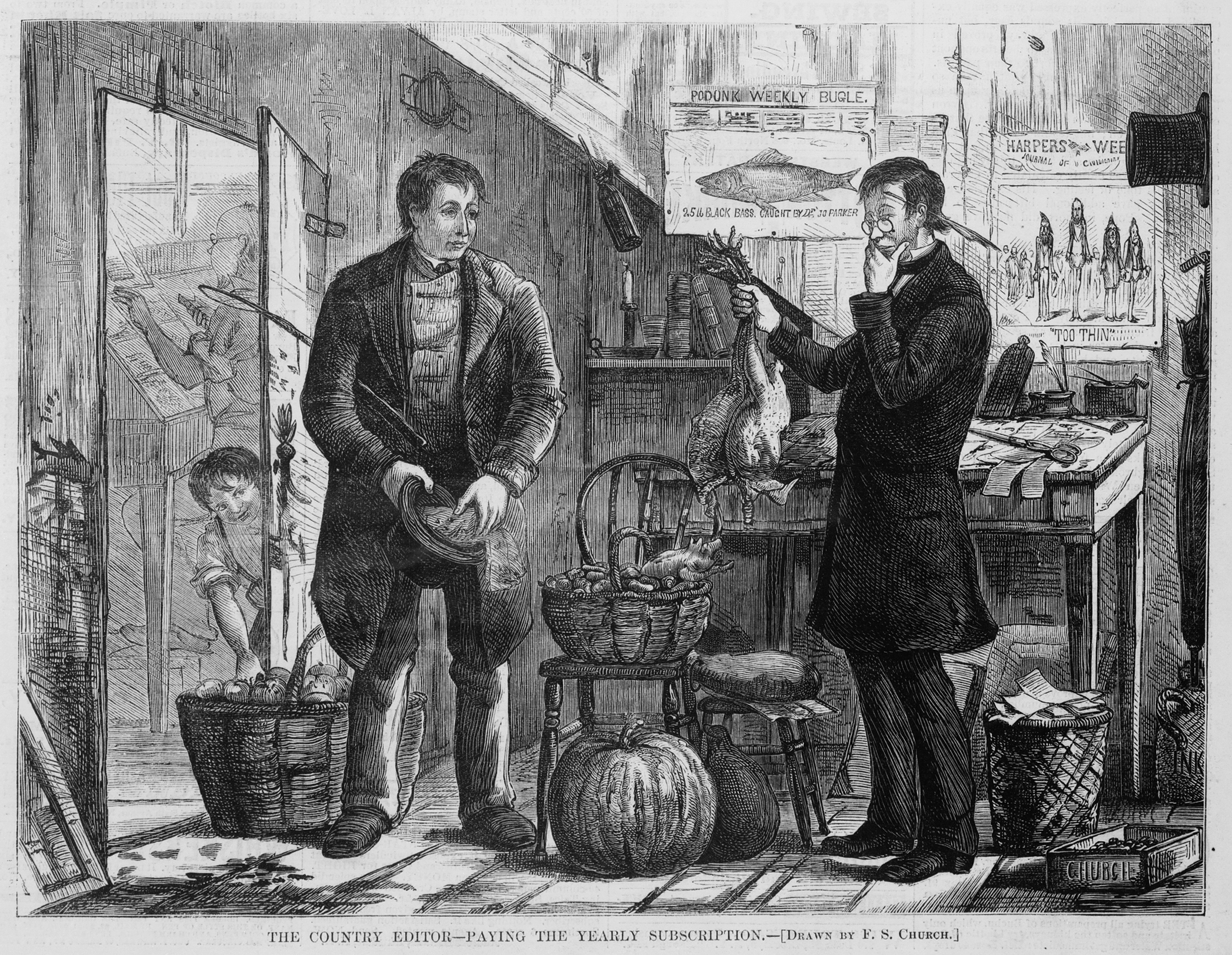
1874 cartoon of a farmer bartering chickens in exchange for a subscription to the "Podunk Weekly Bugle"

The terms podunk and Podunk Hollow in American English denote or describe an insignificant, out-of-the-way, or even completely fictitious town. These terms are often used in the upper case as a placeholder name, to indicate insignificance and lack of importance.

== Etymology ==
The word podunk is of Algonquian origin. It denoted both the Podunk people and marshy locations, particularly the people's winter village site on the border of present-day East Hartford and South Windsor, Connecticut. Podunk was first defined in an American national dictionary in 1934, as an imaginary small town considered typical of placid dullness and lack of contact with the progress of the world.

The earliest citation in the Dictionary of American Regional English is from Samuel Griswold Goodrich's 1840 book The Politician of Podunk:

Solomon Waxtend was a shoemaker of Podunk, a small village of New York some forty years ago.

The book portrays Waxtend as being drawn by his interest in public affairs into becoming a representative in the General Assembly, finding himself unsuited to the role, and returning to his trade. It is unclear whether the author intended to evoke more than the place near Ulysses, New York by the name "Podunk". Possibly the term was meant to exemplify "plain, honest people", as opposed to more sophisticated people with questionable values. An 1875 description said:

Sometimes the newest State, or the youngest county or town of a State is nicknamed "Old Podunk," or whatever it may be, by its affectionate inhabitants, as though their home was an ancient figure in national history.

In American discourse, the term podunk came into general colloquial use through the wide national readership of the "Letters from Podunk" of 1846, in the Daily National Pilot of Buffalo, New York. These represented "Podunk" as a real place but one insignificant and out of the way. The term gained currency as standing for a fictional place. For instance, in 1869, Mark Twain wrote the article "Mr. Beecher and the Clergy," defending his friend Thomas K. Beecher, whose preaching had come under criticism. In it, he said:

They even know it in Podunk, wherever that may be. It excited a two-line paragraph there.

At the time, he was living in Buffalo, moving to Hartford, Connecticut in 1871, in a home within 4 miles (6.4 km) of the Podunk River. Elmira, where Twain had lived earlier, is within 30 miles (48 km) of Podunk, New York, so it is not clear to which village Twain was referring.

== Places named Podunk ==
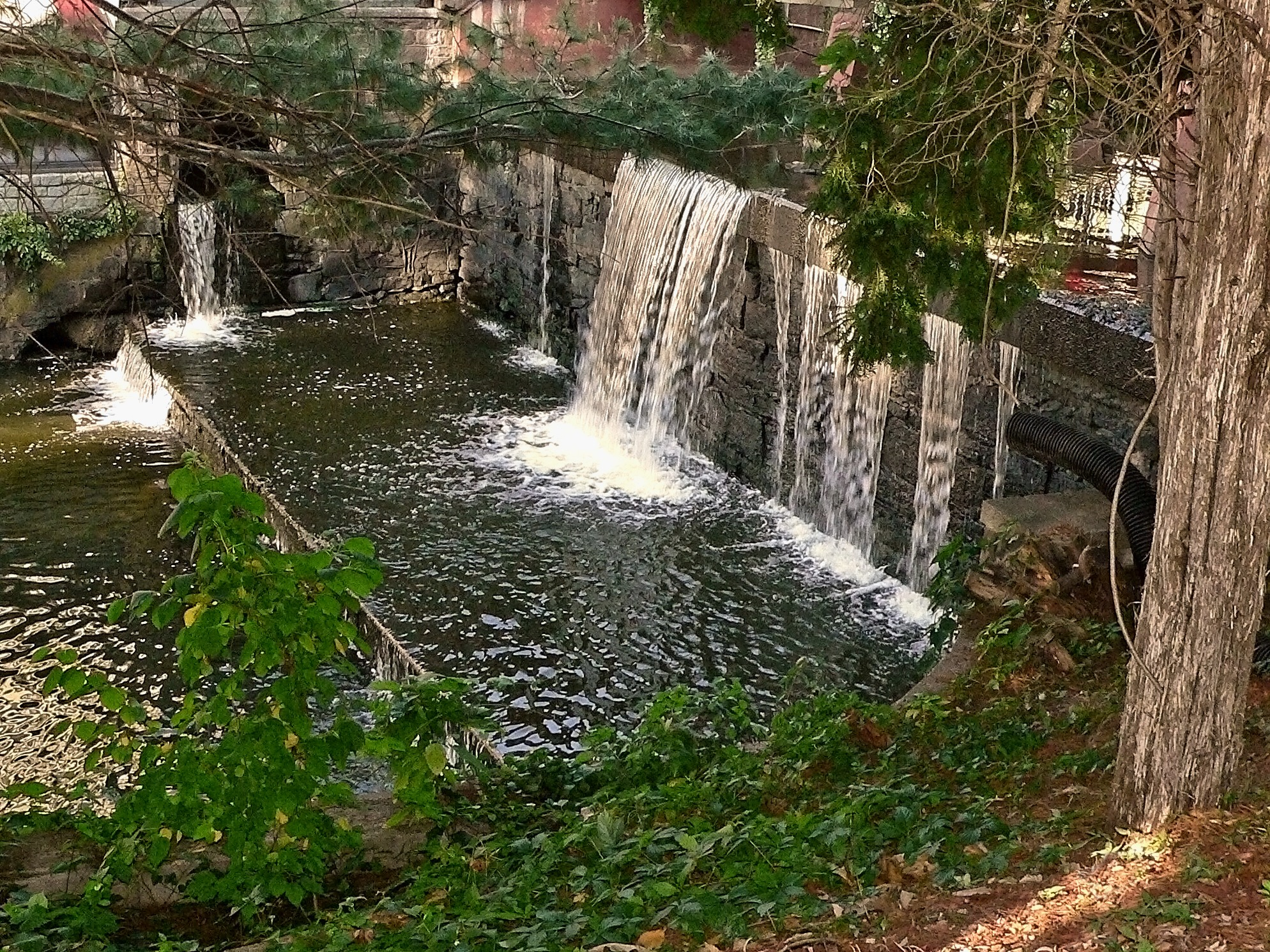
Vinton's Pond Dam on the Podunk River

The United States Board on Geographic Names lists places named "Podunk":

- Podunk, Connecticut, an area of the town of Guilford in New Haven County
- Podunk, New York, a hamlet in the town of Ulysses in Tompkins County
- Podunk, Vermont, an area of the town of Wardsboro in Windham County
- Three places, over 100 miles (160 km) apart, in Michigan:
  - Podunk, Michigan, a community on Podunk Lake in Barry County
  - Podunk, Michigan, a crossroads in Gladwin County
  - Podunk, Michigan, an alternative name for Rogers City, MI in Presque Isle County, Michigan
- Podunk, Michigan, the south eastern portion of the Village of Manchester, Michigan centered on the current village offices, formal before consolidation with the western portion "Manchester" changed in attempts to improve community image, the concurrent USPS designation of the Village of Manchester, Michigan zip code 48158. Washtenaw County, Michigan

Other areas known as Podunk include:

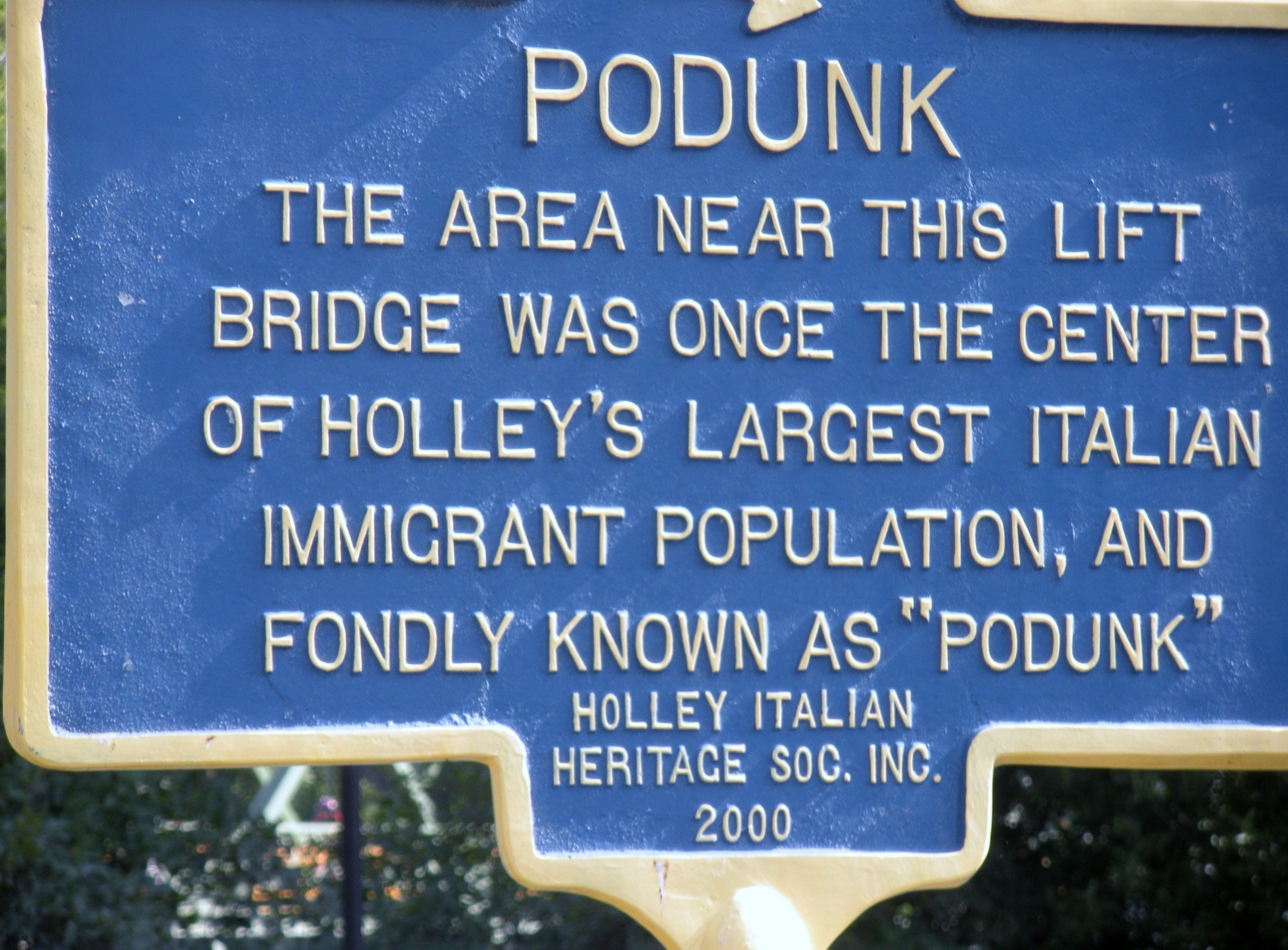
A sign in Holley, New York

- An area of East Hartford, Connecticut in the Podunk River basin including Vinton's Pond
- An area, now a ghost town, eleven miles (18 km) south of Shattuck, Oklahoma in Ellis County
- An area in Dixie National Forest containing a guard station known as the Podunk Guard Station
- Within Worcester County, Massachusetts (and involving three New England towns, each adjacent to at least one of the other two):
  - Podunk, an unincorporated area in East Brookfield, according to The Straight Dope
  - The Podunk Pike, which runs from Sturbridge, north through East Brookfield, and into Spencer
- An area of northwestern Rhode Island 3 miles (4.8 km) WNW of Pascoag
- There is a Potunk Lane in Westhampton Beach, New York, of the same Algonquin origin.
- An alternative spelling, Podonque, is found as a name on a road leading into a settlement area (intersection of County roads 23 and 243) which is still sparsely populated, believed to have been established in the 1800s as Podonque, Town of Rushford, Allegany County, New York.
- An area near the Erie Canal lift bridge in Holley, New York
- A lake in Franklin County, Maine.
- Podunk, Wisconsin, a now defunct town containing a sizable Bradner, Charnley & Co. logging camp, in Door County, Wisconsin

== See also ==
- Backcountry
- Boondocks
