= Alexander (1813 ship) =

History

United Kingdom
- Name: Alexander
- Builder: Aberdeen
- Launched: 1813, or 1815
- Fate: Last listed in 1833

General characteristics
- Tons burthen: 252, or 275 (bm)
- Armament: 6 × 18-pounder carronades

Alexander was built in Aberdeen in 1813 or 1815. She started as a Plymouth-based transport. In 1817 the British Admiralty hired her as one of two vessels that would go on an expedition to search for a Northwest Passage. The expedition was unsuccessful. After her return in 1818, Alexander traded between Britain and North America. The last mention of Alexander in online sources was in 1830.

== Career ==
Alexander first appeared in Lloyd's Register (LR) in 1814. She first appeared in the Register of Shipping in 1816, with the same information re master and trade.

Year	Master	Owner	Trade	Source & notes
1814	J.Pirie	Ritchie, and Co.	Plymouth transport	LR
1817	J.Pirie; J.Ellice		Plymouth transport London–On discovery	Aberdeen
1818	J.Pirie; J.Ellice	Ritchie & Co.	Plymouth transport London–Discovery	LR; repairs 1818

Discovery expedition (1818–1819): The Admiralty hired Alexander in 1817 for a discovery expedition in 1818. She sailed with another hired vessel, Isabella, and the whole expedition was under the command of Commander John Ross, who was sailing in Isabella. Of Alexander's crew of 37 men, four officers, including Lieutenant William Edward Parry, her captain, were clearly from the navy, as were her five marines. The other officers and men were probably civilians, as were John Allison and Joseph Phillips, the Greenland master and Greenland mate. Generally when the navy hired a vessel, it would put a naval officer in command, but keep on the master and crew.

The expedition left the Thames on 18 April 1818 and arrived at Lerwik on 30 April. By 1 June it was on the eastern side of Davis Strait. The expedition followed the coast of Baffin Bay without making any new discoveries.

In mid-November Alexander and Isabella were reported to have arrived in Brassa Sound, Lerwick. Neither had lost any crew nor had any ill.

Alexander, Lieutenant Parry, commander, arrived at Gravesend on 19 November 1818 from Baffin's Bay.

Year	Master	Owner	Trade	Source
1819	J.Allison	Ritchie & Co.	London–On discovery	RS
1819	J.Ellis	Ritchie & Co.	London–Discovery	LR; repairs 1818

The registers were only as accurate as owners chose to keep them. LR continued to carry Alexander with data unchanged since 1819 and did not carry her after 1825. The RS did not update its information until circa 1823 when Alexander underwent a change of ownership. When she sailed to New Brunswick she brought back timber from Miramichi.

Year	Master	Owner	Trade	Source & notes
1823	J.Allison; J.Booth	Ritchie; Thompson	London–On discovery London Derry–New Brunswick	RS
1825	J.Booth	Thompson	London Derry–Quebec	RS
1830	Robinson	Thompson	Leith–America	RS; thorough repair 1827

The last readily accessible press mention of Alexander, Robinson, master, was that on 17 May 1829 Alexander, of Newcastle, Robinson, master, had come into Pictou leaky. She had spent several days on shore at Prince Edward's Island.

The Register of Shipping ceased publishing with the 1833 volume and still carried Alexander, Robinson, master.
