= American Republics Corporation =

Former US oil industry and shipping Company

- Company type: Privately held company
- Industry: Oil industry
- Founded: 1916 in Houston, Texas
- Defunct: 1956
- Fate: Sold to Sinclair Oil
- Successor: Sinclair Oil Corporation
- Area served: United States
- Key people: Joseph S. Cullinan; Will Hogg; James L. Autry; Emerson Francis Woodward; Torkild Rieber; Thomas Peter Lee
- Products: Oil production, oil shipping
- Subsidiaries: Farmers Oil Company; Republic Production Company; American Petroleum Company; Petroleum Iron Works; Papoose Oil Company; Federal Petroleum Company

American Republics Corporation was a Texas oil company that was founded by Joseph S. Cullinan in Houston, Texas in 1916. Joseph S. Cullinan owned Farmers Oil Company and other companies. Cullinan consolidated with twenty subsidiary companies into the American Republics Corporation. American Republics Corporation became the holding company for all the subsidiary.

By 1927 American Republics Corporation owned two million acres of oil land, refineries, rail tankers and tanker ships. Cullinan resigned as president of American Republics Corporation in 1928. During the Great Depression American Republics Corporation was forced into receivership.

In 1936 Cullinan returned and became president again. American Republics Corporation was active in supporting the World War II efforts with oil supply and tanker ships.

== History ==
The Texas Oil Company (now Texaco), was founded by Cullinan in 1913. But when the Texas Oil Company moved its headquarters to New York City, Cullinan, James L. Autry (1860-1920), and Will Hogg stayed in Texas and founded the Farmers Oil Company in 1915. Farmers Oil Company purchased an abandoned oil field dig deeper oil wells and found new oil. James L. Autry and Will Hogg were Cullinan attorneys and stockholders at Texas Oil Company.

Due to the success of Farmers Oil Company Cullinan founded the Republic Production Company at Spindletop. Republic Production Company was founded for Cullinan oil exploration and oil production. Cullinan also founded at the same time the American Petroleum Company at Corsicana, Texas. American Petroleum Company operated Cullinan a pipeline and refining plant. Also founded at the same time was American Republics Corporation a holding company for the stock of the new subsidiary companies. New subsidiaries were added: the Papoose Oil Company of Oklahoma; the Federal Petroleum Company of Louisiana and the Petroleum Iron Works of Sharon, Pennsylvania (already owned by Cullinan).

Some of the companies Cullinan invested in were: Hughes Tool Company, Paraffin Oil Company, Texas Fuel Company (now Texaco) and the Hogg-Swain Syndicate. Houston Oil Company and American Republics Corporation entered in a partnership and American Republics Corporation found a new oilfield, called the Hull Field in Liberty County. Cullinan was active in the development of the Humble, Texas and East Texas Oil Field.

In 1956 American Republics Corporation, American Republics and the subsidiaries were all sold to Sinclair Oil Corporation $108 million. Cullinan started in the oil industry in 1898 with the J.S. Cullinan Company, that later became the Magnolia Petroleum Company. J.S. Cullinan Company founded a refinery on the Corsicana oilfield. Corsicana oilfield was found by accident in 1894 by the American Well and Prospecting Company while drilling for water.

Cullinan founded Petroleum Iron Works in 1895 after departing Standard Oil. Petroleum Iron Works manufactured steel storage tanks. Cullinan next founded J. S. Cullinan Company in Corsicana, which later became Magnolia Petroleum Company. Cullinan next founded the Texas Company in 1902, that later became Texaco.

== World War II ==
American Republics Corporation ships were used to help the World War II effort. During World War II American Republics Corporation operated Merchant navy ships for the United States Shipping Board. During World War II American Republics Corporation was active with charter shipping with the Maritime Commission and War Shipping Administration. Sword Line, Inc. operated tankers and Liberty Ships for the merchant navy. The ship was run by its American Republics Corporation crew and the US Navy supplied United States Navy Armed Guards to man the deck guns and radio.

== Ships ==
Liberty ship of World War II

=== Pre World War II ===
- Republic (1), tanker, built in 1920 at Bethlehem Shipbuilding Corp, Wilmington, DE, was Weweantic and Liberty Minquas. purchased in 1923 and renamed Republic. Sank on February 22, 1942 hit by two torpedoes from German submarine U-504 off Jupiter Island, Florida.
- Norsworthy, built in 1916 as Twilite, acquired in 1925, sold in 1927.

=== World War II operated ships ===
Liberty Ships, Armadillo-class tanker:

- George W. Kendall, tanker built in 1943
- Andrew Marschalk, tanker built in 1943
- Jean Baptiste Le Moyne, tanker built in 1943
- Josiah G. Holland, tanker built in 1943

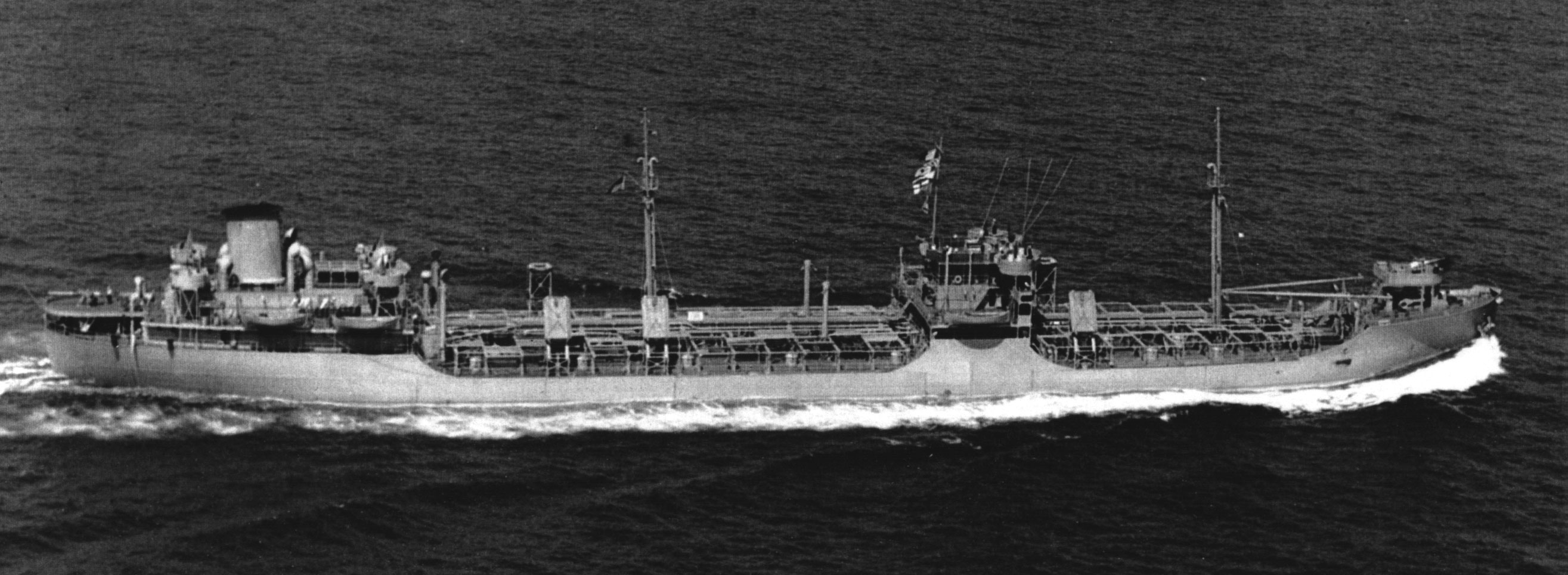
A T2 tanker in 1943

=== After World War II ===
T2 tanker ships:

- Republic (2), tanker, was El Caney, built in 1944 at Alabama Dry Dock, post war work 1948-
- Beecher Island, tanker T2-SE-A1, operated in 1946.

== See also ==
- World War II United States Merchant Navy
- James L. Autry House (Courtlandt Place, Houston)
