= Isabella (1813 ship) =

British merchantman and whaler 1813–1835

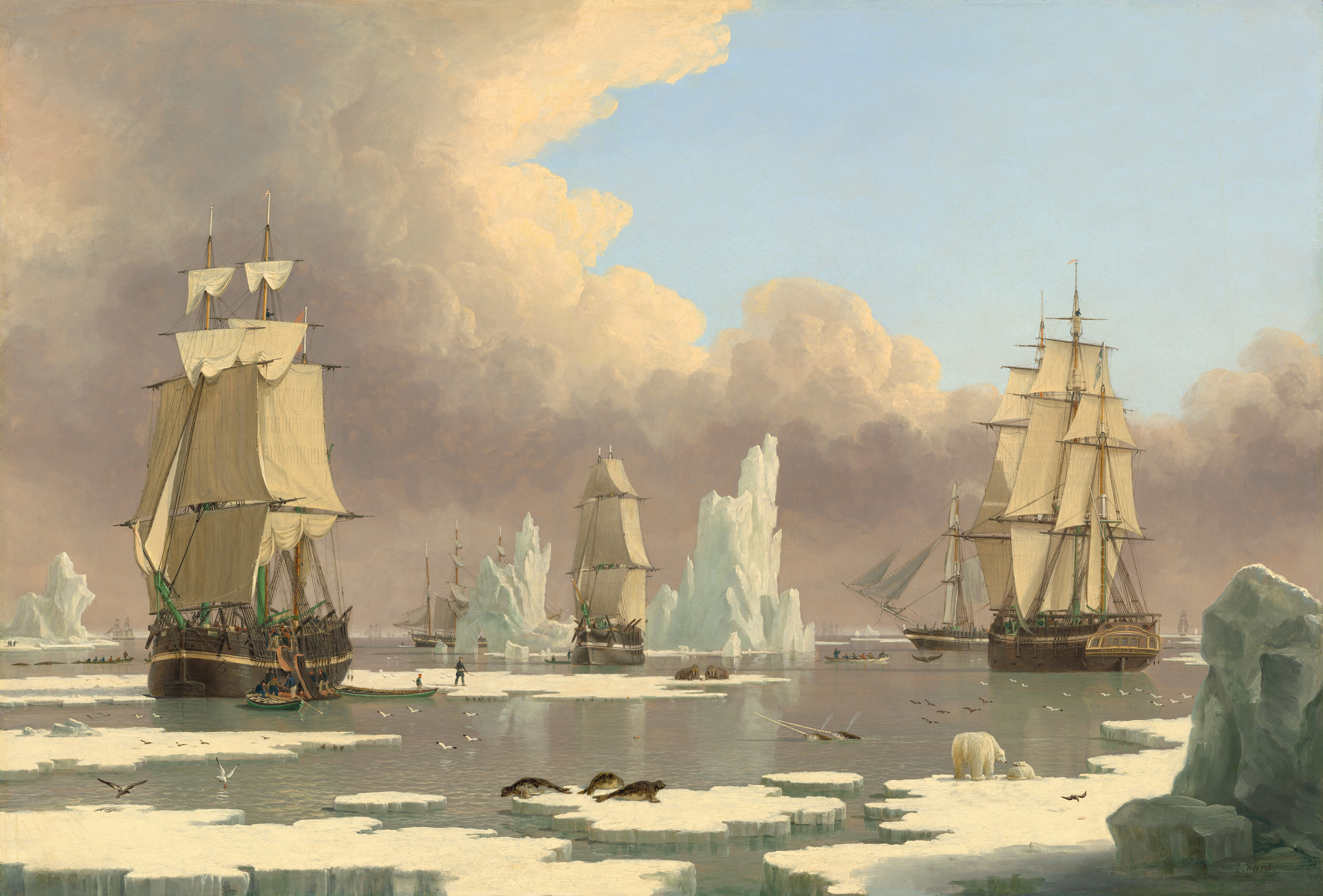
- The Northern Whale Fishery: The Isabella (right) and Swan (left)

History

United Kingdom
- Name: Isabella
- Builder: Kingston upon Hull
- Launched: 1813
- Fate: Wrecked 14 June 1835

General characteristics
- Tons burthen: 374, or 380, or 382, or 385 (bm)
- Armament: 8 × 18-pounder carronades

Isabella was launched in Kingston upon Hull in 1813. She initially sailed as a transport, and then as a merchantman trading with Canada. In 1817 the British Admiralty hired her as one of two vessels that would go on an expedition to search for a Northwest Passage. The expedition was unsuccessful. In 1820 she underwent two maritime mishaps, only one of which was substantive. From 1824 until she wrecked in the ice in June 1835 she was a whaler in the northern whale fishery (Davis Strait and Greenland).

== Merchantman ==
Isabella first appeared in Lloyd's Register (LR) in 1813.

Year	Master	Owner	Trade	Source & notes
1813	Haslewd	W.Moxon	Hull transport	LR
1816	Haslewd; A.Haigh	W.Moxon	Hull transport	LR
1818	A.Hague; Galloway	W.Moxon	Cork transport	LR
1819	Galloway; C.Brady	Moxon & Co.	London–Disco; Hull–Pictou	LR; good repair 1818
1820	C.Brady; J.Todd	Moxon & Co.	Hull–Pictou	LR; good repair 1818, small repairs 1819, & large repair 1820

Discovery expedition (1818-1819): The Lloyd's Register data does not recognize that the Admiralty hired Isabella in 1817 for a discovery expedition in 1818. She sailed with another hired vessel, Alexander. The two vessels was under the command of Commander John Ross, who was sailing in Isabella, and their task was to explore Baffin Bay. They accompanied the Davis Strait whalers.

Of Isabella's crew of 54 men, four officers were clearly from the navy, as were her six marines. The other officers and men were probably civilians, as were Benjamin Lewis (the master and Greenland pilot), and Thomas Wilcox (the mate and also a Greenland pilot). (Generally when the navy hired a vessel, it would put a naval officer in command, but keep on the master and crew.) There were also three supernumeraries — Captain Sabine and a sergeant from the Royal Artillery (Sabine being the scientific observer), and the Eskimo Sacheous, who was being repatriated.

The expedition left the Thames on 18 April 1818 and arrived at Lerwik on 30 April. By 1 June it was on the eastern side of Davis Strait. The expedition followed the coast of Baffin Bay without making any new discoveries.

On 24 June the expedition was at 70°44′N 54°22′W when it became trapped in ice, and Alexandria grounded. The expedition only got free with the assistance of four nearby whalers. In late July Ross named Melville Bay and Melville Monument for Viscount Melville, who had given Ross his first commission.

In mid-November Isabella and Alexander were reported to have arrived in Brassa Sound, Lerwick. Neither had lost any crew nor had any ill. The expedition did not find any passage to north west, but it did result in whalers knowing that they could work their way out of Davis Strait along the west side, and that there were whales in the fjords and inlets along the way.

On 6 January 1820 Isabella, Brady, master, was driven ashore at Spurn Point. A lifeboat rescued the crew, but it was feared that she would be wrecked. She was on a voyage from Miramichi Bay to Hull, Yorkshire. Isabella was later refloated and taken in to Hull.

On 16 July Isabella, Todd, master, was sailing from Hull to Quebec when she ran ashore on a reef of rocks near Lopness. She was gotten off with apparently trifling damage and proceeded on her voyage.

Year	Master	Owner	Trade	Source & notes
1824	J.Todd	Moxon & Co.	Hull–Quebec	LR; large repair 1820, & repairs 1821, 1822, & 1823

== Whaler ==
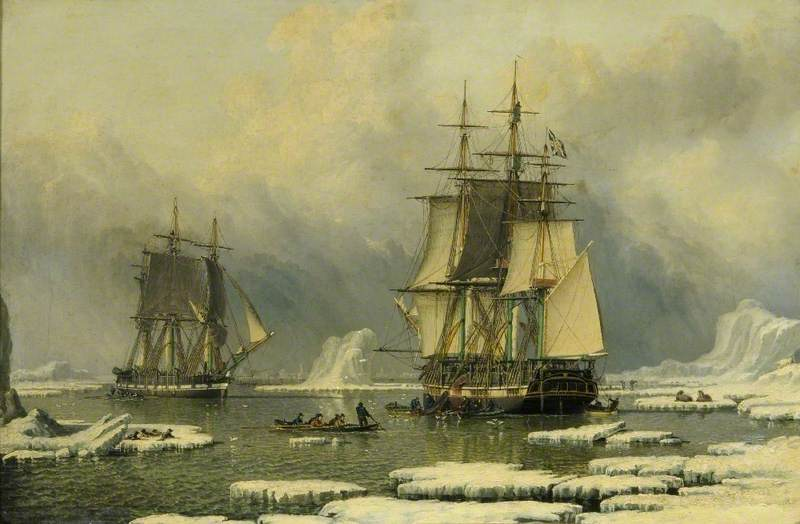
The Swan and Isabella (stern view)

In 1824 Thomas Carlill purchased Isabella to sail her out of Hull as a whaler to Davis Strait.

Year	Master	Owner	Trade	Source & notes
1825	Humphrey	Captain & Co.	Hull–Greenland	LR; large repair 1820, & repairs 1823 & 1824

The data in the two tables below is from Coltish.

Year	Master	"Fish" (Whales)	Tuns whale oil
1824	Humphrey	11	145
1825	Humphrey	7	80

In 1825 she struck a submerged rock in the Davis Strait. She was badly damaged but survived to continue whaling.

Year	Master	"Fish" (Whales)	Tuns whale oil
1826	Mackenzie	8	99
1827	Humphrey	23	243, or 250
1828	Humphrey	17	235
1829	Humphrey	10	131
1830	Humphrey	5	94
1831	McKenzie	1	12
1832	McKenzie	42	272, or 275; one of the two best fished Hull vessels
1833	[R. Wallis] Humphrey[s]	27	180
1834	Humphrey	13	90

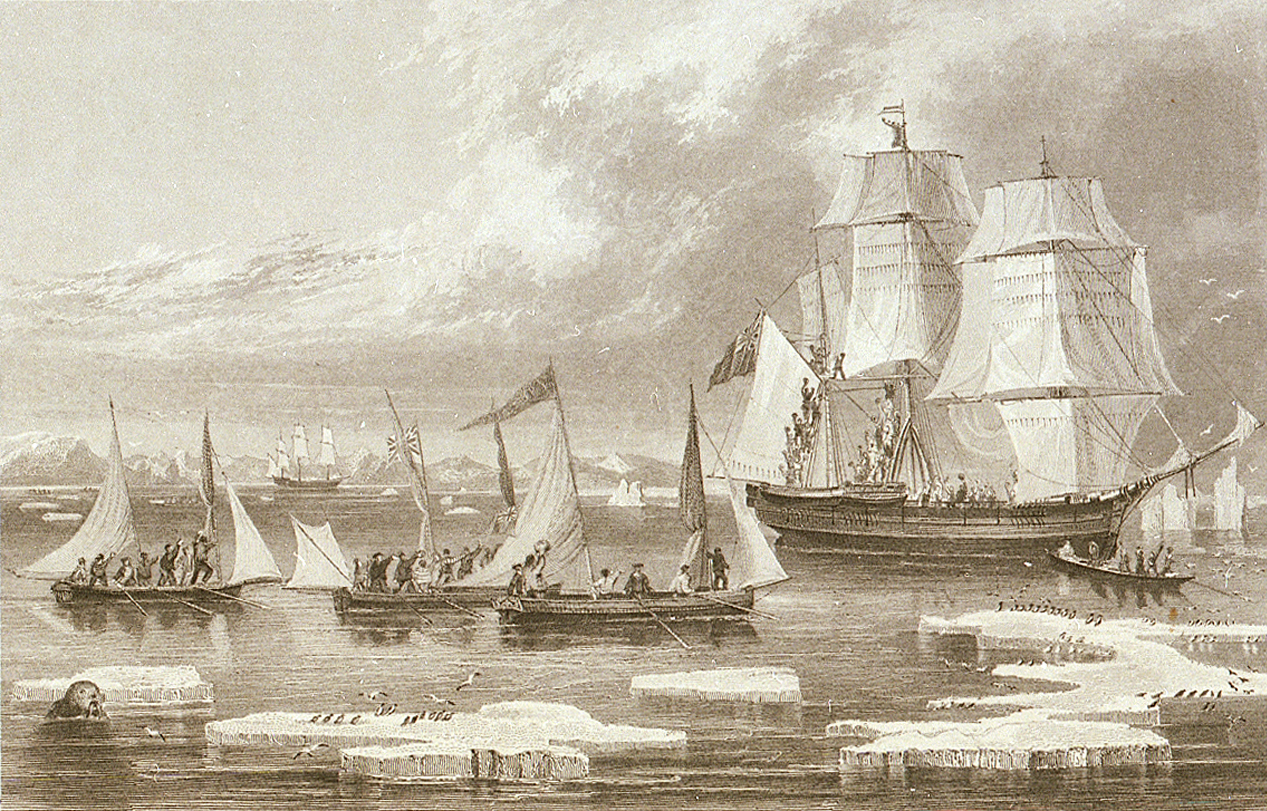
Isabella saves the crew of Victory, 1834 engraving.

In 1833 Isabella rescued John Ross, whose ship Victory had become beset by ice on Ross's second Arctic expedition. Isabella and William Lee had spent the season in company andstayed on in the region after the other vessels there had left. Isabella and William Lee sailed about 100 miles further into Lancaster Sound than any other whaler had ever gone. Ross stated that Humphreys was looking for Ross, expecting to find that Ross and his men had been lost. Humphreys disputed Ross's claim, stating that he, Humphreys, had been looking for whales. William Lee was still in company when Ross's boats reached Isabella. After Humphreys rescued Ross, Isabella continued whaling for about another month.

== Fate ==
Captain Robert Carlill sailed Isabella to Davis Strait in 1835. She was wrecked there on 14 June 1835 by ice. Lee rescued her 35 crew on 17 June. Some members of the crew were badly frost-bitten. Lee was lost on 1 July; her crew too were saved. (Note: Some sources mistakenly confuse William Lee with Lee.)

Captain Carlill and part of his crew went into Lively Harbour to secure passage home via Danish packet brigs.
