= William Leigh (disambiguation) =

William Leigh (1550–1639) was an English clergyman and royal tutor.

William Leigh may also refer to:

- William Leigh (MP), member of Parliament for Cumberland in 1399 and 1414
- William Leigh (Dean of Hereford) (1752–1809), Anglican priest
- William Henry Leigh (merchant) (1781–1818), merchant and former colonial official in Sierra Leone
- William Leigh (judge) (1783–1871), American jurist
- William Henry Leigh, 2nd Baron Leigh (1824–1905), British politician
- William Leigh, ship's surgeon, early settler and landowner at Clarendon, South Australia c.1846
- William Robinson Leigh (1866–1955), American artist
- William Colston Leigh Sr. (1901–1992), American businessman, created one of the world's leading speakers' agencies
- William Gerard Leigh (1915–2008), member of the British Life Guards and major figure in the polo world

== See also ==
- William Lee (disambiguation)
