= William Lea =

William Lea may refer to:

- William Lea (businessman) (1805–1876), American businessman, responsible for the development of the Brandywine Mills
- William E. Lea (1907–1970), British philatelist
- William C. Lea (1833–1911), farmer and political figure on Prince Edward Island
- William Lea (priest) (1820–1889), English Anglican priest
- William N'Jo Léa (born 1962), French footballer

== See also ==
- William Lee (disambiguation)
