= Miles Franklin Yount =

American businessman (1880–1933)

Miles Franklin "Frank" Yount (born January 31, 1880, in Monticello, Arkansas, died November 13, 1933, in Beaumont, Texas) eventually came to head up one of the most successful private oil companies in the United States.

== Career ==
Although famous in later years as the "Godfather of Beaumont", Frank's early life is shrouded in mystery. After his father's death at age fifty, Frank was forced to leave school and take on the mantle of additional responsibilities. In 1897, however, he and a younger brother, Sullie, left Arkansas and traveled to the Texas Gulf Coast. In the beginning, they made their living digging irrigation canals for rice farmers, and later the two became water-well drillers, until finally, they succumbed to oil fever.

Beaumont was home to the famous Lucas Gusher that brought in the great Spindletop Oil Boom of 1901. At age twenty-four, Frank began his quest for oil riches that led him to such boom towns as Sour Lake, Saratoga, and Batson. He teamed up with another future Texas giant, John Henry Phelan, but he never made any serious inroads at discovering oil until he formed a partnership with Thomas Peter Lee, an oil investor based out of Houston. Lee provided the funds and allowed Yount the freedom to drill where and when he wanted.

With the formation of the Yount-Lee Oil Company on December 22, 1914, Yount made his mark in the area of deep drilling, much of that on the flanks of old oil fields thought to be depleted. In 1923, he moved his company from Sour Lake to Beaumont, where he and wife Pansy, bought and renovated “El Ocaso,” a magnificent mansion located on Calder Avenue, known once as “Millionaires’ Row.”

In Beaumont, Yount formed a working relationship with Marrs McLean, “The Second Prophet of Spindletop.” McLean held most of the leases at Spindletop Oil Field which by 1923, according to a majority of oil experts, had run its course. Yount took over McLean's leases, and entered agreements with other property owners in and around the old field. To the surprise of most, on November 14, 1925, Yount-Lee brought in a well that regenerated Spindletop, and from that point, the company grew by leaps and bounds.

== Personal ==
On the personal side, Yount used his wealth to benefit his fellow man, and on at least two occasions during the Great Depression, his company loaned the City of Beaumont enough money to pay its city workers. He also bought some of the most expensive and classy automobiles of the day, owning at the same time three Duesenbergs, a Pierce-Arrow, a Cord, and an Austin Coupe. (As the story goes Mr. Yount walked into the Duesenberg factory and told the sales manager which three cars he wished to buy. Being quoted the cost, Yount asked if he could write out a check for all three automobiles? The sales manager looking at Mr. Yount's with a Texas address asked Mr. Yount if they could contact his Beaumont bank to confirm the check's validity? When called the Beaumont bank president inquired just how much the total would be for the cars? When told the amount the president told Duesenberg's sales manager, please have Mr. Yount make his check out for $50,000. He is good for it and we will cover it!) He built Spindletop Stables in Beaumont, stocked it with American Saddlebreds, and hired famous horse trainer, William Capers "Cape" Grant to run it. Later in Kentucky, this stable would play a very important part in the legacy of that particular breed.

== Death ==
Upon his sudden death caused by a massive heart attack on November 13, 1933, Frank Yount's estate was valued at over $8 million, and when the stockholders sold Yount-Lee on July 31, 1935, the sale amounted to $46.2 million, putting it as the third largest financial transaction in the United States to that point.

Yount, a regent of the University of Texas, was survived by his wife, Pansy, and their adopted daughter, Mildred Frank. He is buried at Beaumont's Magnolia Cemetery.

== See also ==
- Spindletop Hall
- Stradivarius Violins
