= Aberthau House =

Historic structure in Vancouver, Canada

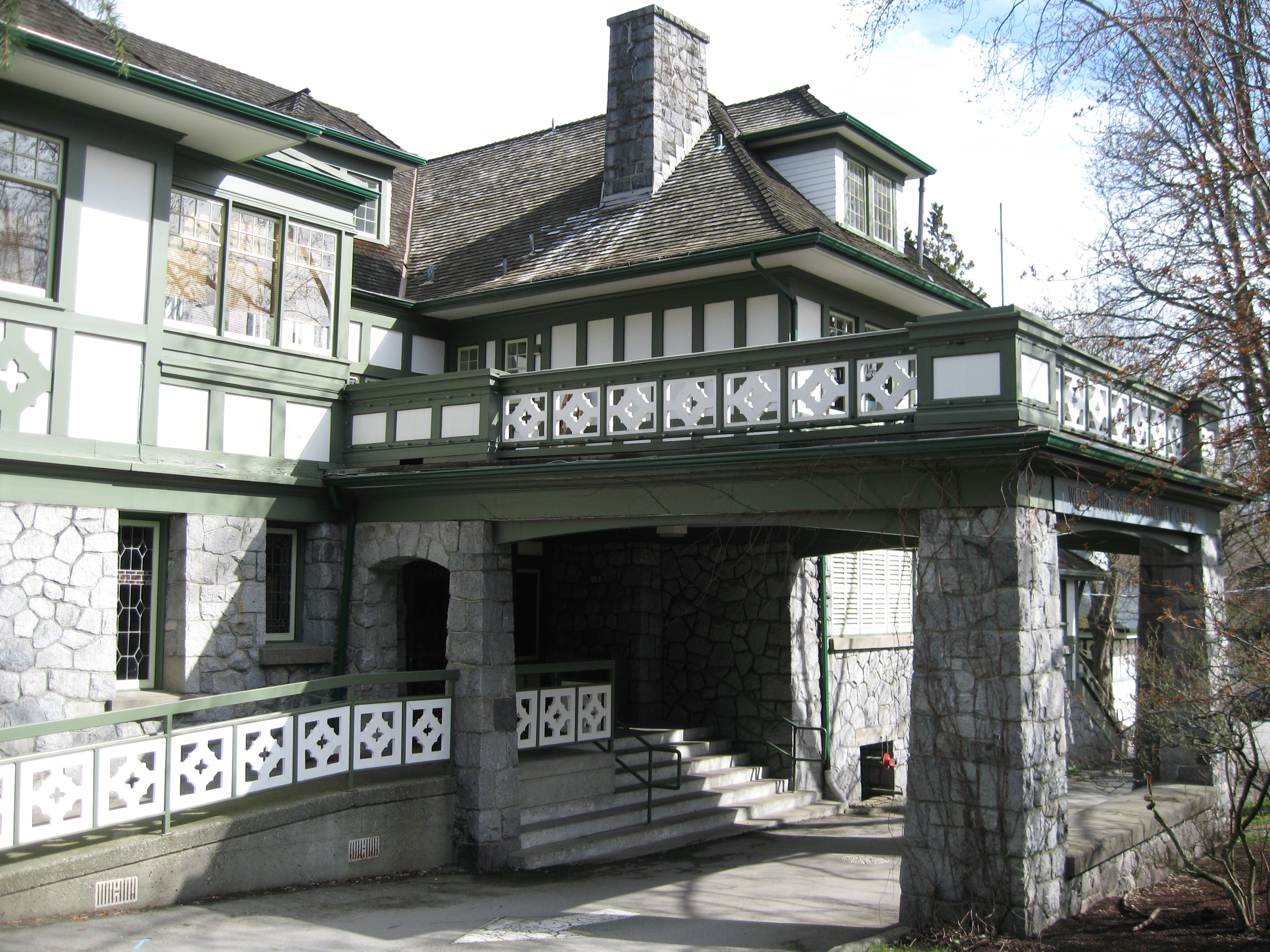
- The porte-cochère of Aberthau house.
- Interactive map of the Aberthau House area
- Former names: Rear House
- Alternative names: West Point Grey Community Centre

General information
- Type: House / Community Centre
- Architectural style: Tudorbethan
- Location: 4397 West 2nd Avenue, Vancouver, Canada
- Coordinates: 49.2715°N 123.2051°W
- Construction started: 1910
- Completed: 1913

Website
- westpointgrey.org

Aberthau House (previously known as Rear House) is a spacious heritage mansion in Tudor Revival style, located at the intersection of West 2nd Avenue and Trimble Street in Vancouver, British Columbia, which currently serves as a facility of the neighbourhood's community centre. Situated on the highlands of the Point Grey neighbourhood, it overlooks English Bay, the Gulf of Georgia, and the City of Vancouver.

The first notably large residential property in Point Grey, a distinct municipality from the City of Vancouver until 1929, this edifice was designed by British Columbia's respected, but largely undiscovered, architect, Samuel Maclure. It serves as an example of Tudorbethan architecture, one of Maclure's famed specialties, the other being the American Craftsman Style.

== History ==
Initially the residence of James Rear, General Manager of American Life Insurance, the estate's name, 'Rear House,' reflected its owner's surname accordingly. Architect Maclure was commissioned in 1909 to design the home, and construction was carried out during a four-year period from 1910-1913. Rear's four children, two boys and two girls, enjoyed the expansive property, which included an automobile garage, a carriage and stable house, an (unfinished, but children-friendly) attic, and a spacious verandah, which extended around two sides of the building, with a stone base and open enclosure above.

Five years after the completion of the building, in 1918, Colonel Victor Spencer, son of businessman David Spencer, the founder of the department store chain 'Spencer's,' acquired the mansion, as the Rear family relocated to Pasadena, California. The new owner, veteran from the Boer War and the First World War, renamed his home 'Aberthau,' a Welsh term to indicate "a place filled with light."

To accommodate the new owner's large family, the building underwent various major renovations, largely contributing to the house's modern form. Under his direction, a new main doorway on West 2nd Avenue replaced the original entrance at Trimble Street. Further alternations saw to the elimination of the hall fireplace and inglenook, and the addition of the 2nd storey to the East Façade. The most noteworthy renovation however, was the incorporation of a stone verandah as the new family room on the West Façade. Passionately called the 'Oak Room,' it functioned as a popular reception area for parties and family gatherings. With the acquisition of lands to the north and east of the grounds, Colonel Spencer extended the gardens and built a tennis court.

With its expropriation procedures in 1938, the federal government took possession of the property, so that the 22-room structure could function as the Royal Canadian Air Force Officers' Mess for the neighboring seaplane base at Jericho Beach. For its purchase, together with 5.85 acres (23,700 m^{2}) of land, the Spencer family received a sum of $94,466.00.

The structure suffered several damages during the war times, with a fire destroying the roof and the attic being severely damaged in 1943. However, the collaborative effort of the Fire Department and officers assisted in the aversion of additional destruction. During this period, funds were allocated to modernize Aberthau's plumbing systems, restore the ruined upper stories, particularly in the north-west corner, and to underpin and strengthen the mansion's foundations.

With the military forces vacating in the spring of 1972, the city of Vancouver, having merged with Point Grey decades before, obtained legal ownership the building when the nearby Jericho Beach was given to the municipality by the federal government.

With Aberthau House being turned over to the Board of Parks and Recreation for the provision of intern space of the 'West Point Grey Recreation Project,' it was also recognized for its potential as a cultural and recreation centre. Further renovations and alterations were required, and in October 1973, City Council reserved $75,000 for this purpose. An additional sum of $25,000 provided by the Province's 'Recreation Facilities Fund,' was also collected. A year later, with programming starting in September 1974, the newly refurbished cultural and recreation centre officially opened on 16 November by Commissioner May Brown.

== Current: West Point Grey Community Centre ==
Since 1974, the Tudorbethan-styled Aberthau House has served, in conjunction with other facilities, as a recreational centre, offering a broad range of activities and programs for Vancouver residents of all ages. Creative art courses, dancing lessons, language programs, and music instruction are among the many selections that constitute its offerings. The community centre is jointly operated by both the city's Board of Parks and Recreation and the West Point Grey Community Association.

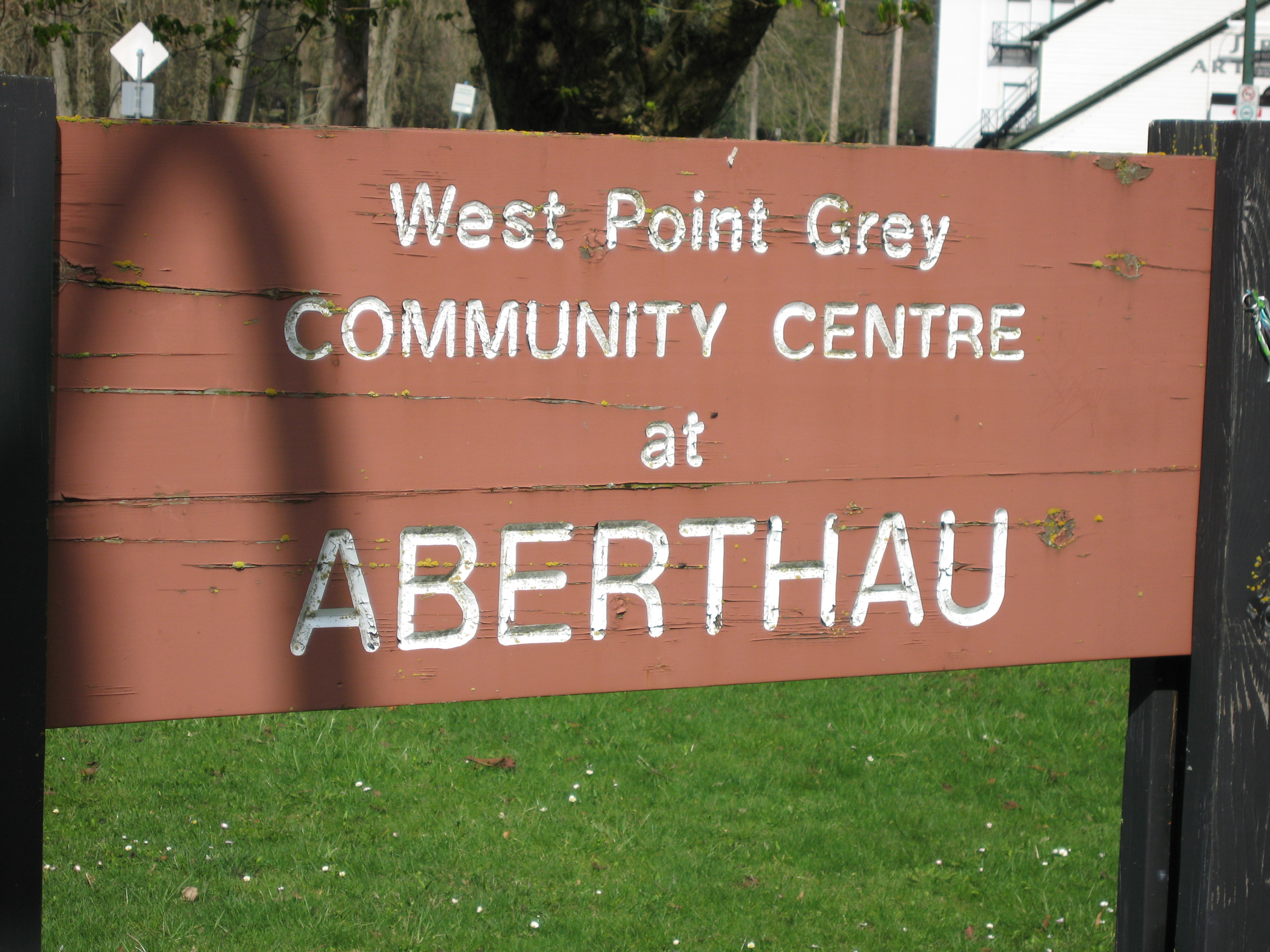

The roomy chambers of the Aberthau House render it a popular venue for various social events. Available for rental, the large mansion may operate as the location for wedding receptions, parties, workshops, meetings, staff retreats, memorial services, piano recitals, and other social gatherings. The heritage site also presents several annual seasonal events, such as autumn's haunted house, winter's 'Breakfast with Santa, and spring's 'Family Easter.'

The adjacent building, originally a coach house and horse stable, now functions as a pottery studio, equipped with twelve potter's wheels and several work stations. It offers a range of demonstrative workshops and classes.

In addition, on the property exists a fitness centre and gymnasium, which house a variety of aerobic machines, weights and accessories, such as wobble boards and Swiss balls. Drop-in exercise classes are held regularly for children, youths, and adults.

== Tudorbethan Architecture ==
Tudorbethan Architecture, also called Tudor Revival or Mock Tudor, became popular in the early 20th century for suburban and domestic homes. Drawing upon elements of the Picturesque Movement from the late 18th century, and Tudor style prototypes from the English countryside, it was popularized by famed Brit, Richard Norman Shaw. As it was one of architect Samuel Maclure's areas of expertise, Aberthau House is a prime example of this architectural style.

=== Exterior ===
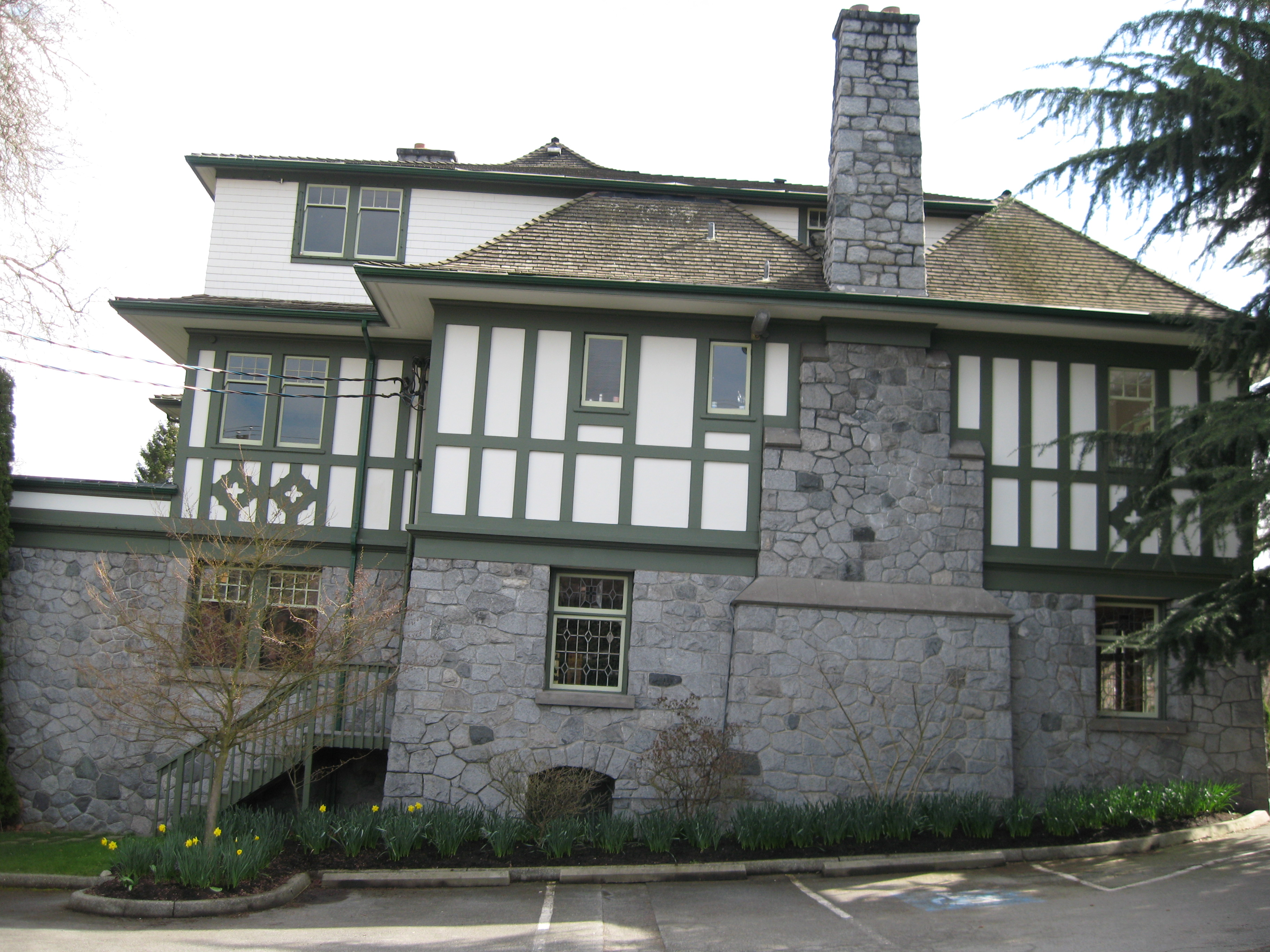

Encountering the Tudorbethan works of Wilson Eyre during a year-long study in Philadelphia, Maclure's incorporation of Eyre's half timbering and freely assembled stone technique projects itself unavoidably at Aberthau. Nonetheless, the architect managed to erect Aberthau with a healthy balance of his own distinctive innovations and traits of the Tudor Revival Style. The enormous masonry base is balanced by the vertical arrangement of the wood panels, and the stone chimneys, characteristic of the Tudor Revival style, anchor the almost Oriental nature of the eaves.

The colour scheme, white, light green, and dark green, also follows Mock Tudor guidelines. The green hues, which are employed on the trim and border details, contrast sharply to the white tones and the gray stone.

The Tudorbethan influences are further punctuated by several over physical features, which are visible on the exterior of the building. These include:

- A hipped roof
- The massive masonry base, laid in an ornate pattern, for the lower exterior wall
- Stucco on the upper stories, decorated with false half-timbered
- Gables and dormers that protrude from the roof
- An elaborate stone chimney
- Casement windows (those that open vertically) framed in wood, which are grouped in rows of two or more
- Stained glass windows that decorate the entrance doorway

=== Interior ===
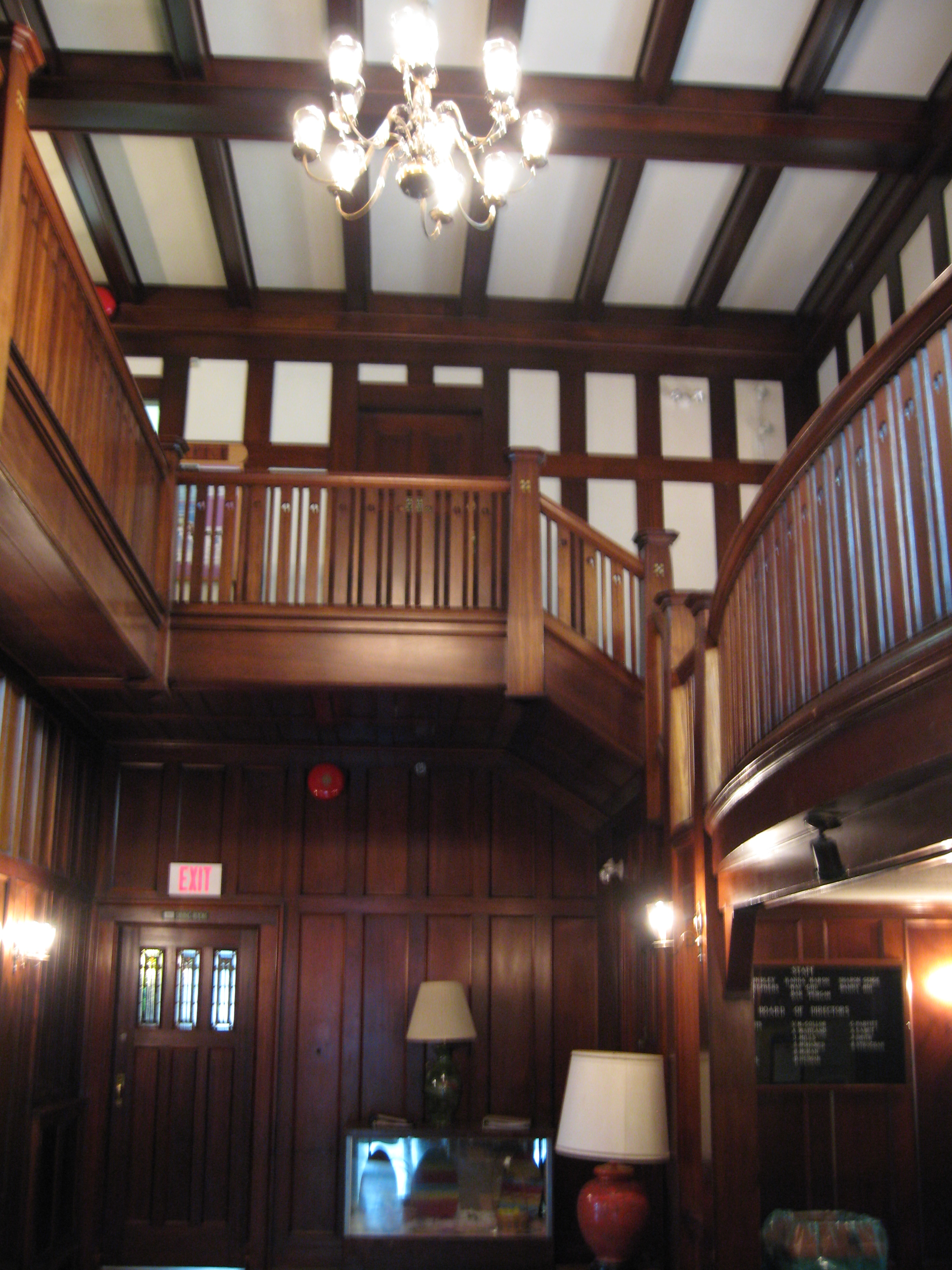

The interior design of Aberthau deviates from the Tudor form and relies on Maclure's own signature approach. Highlights of the house include a grand, central, living hall, paneled with hardwood and furnished with a fireplace, a winding staircase, and a two-storied gallery. Gargoyles guarding the library chimney, the staircase's mother-of-pearl adorned newel posts, the hardwood flooring and the incorporation of stained glass, comprise the staggering list of ornate embellishments present inside the edifice.

The maximum view of the surrounding scenery is encompassed in the layout, encouraging movement towards the structure's windows and extremities. Meanwhile, the attractive central hall beckons inhabitants to the hearth. This 'inward-outward' pull draws from inspiration of the respected architect, Frank Lloyd Wright.

The alterations made under the director of Colonel Spencer saw to the elegant Oak Room, whose linen-folk oak paneling and ribbed plaster ceiling proves to be impressive, and to the greater freedom in movement enabled by the West 2nd Avenue entrance.

== See also ==
- List of old Canadian buildings
- List of heritage buildings in Vancouver
