= William Lee (1831 ship) =

UK whaler and merchant ship 1831–1847

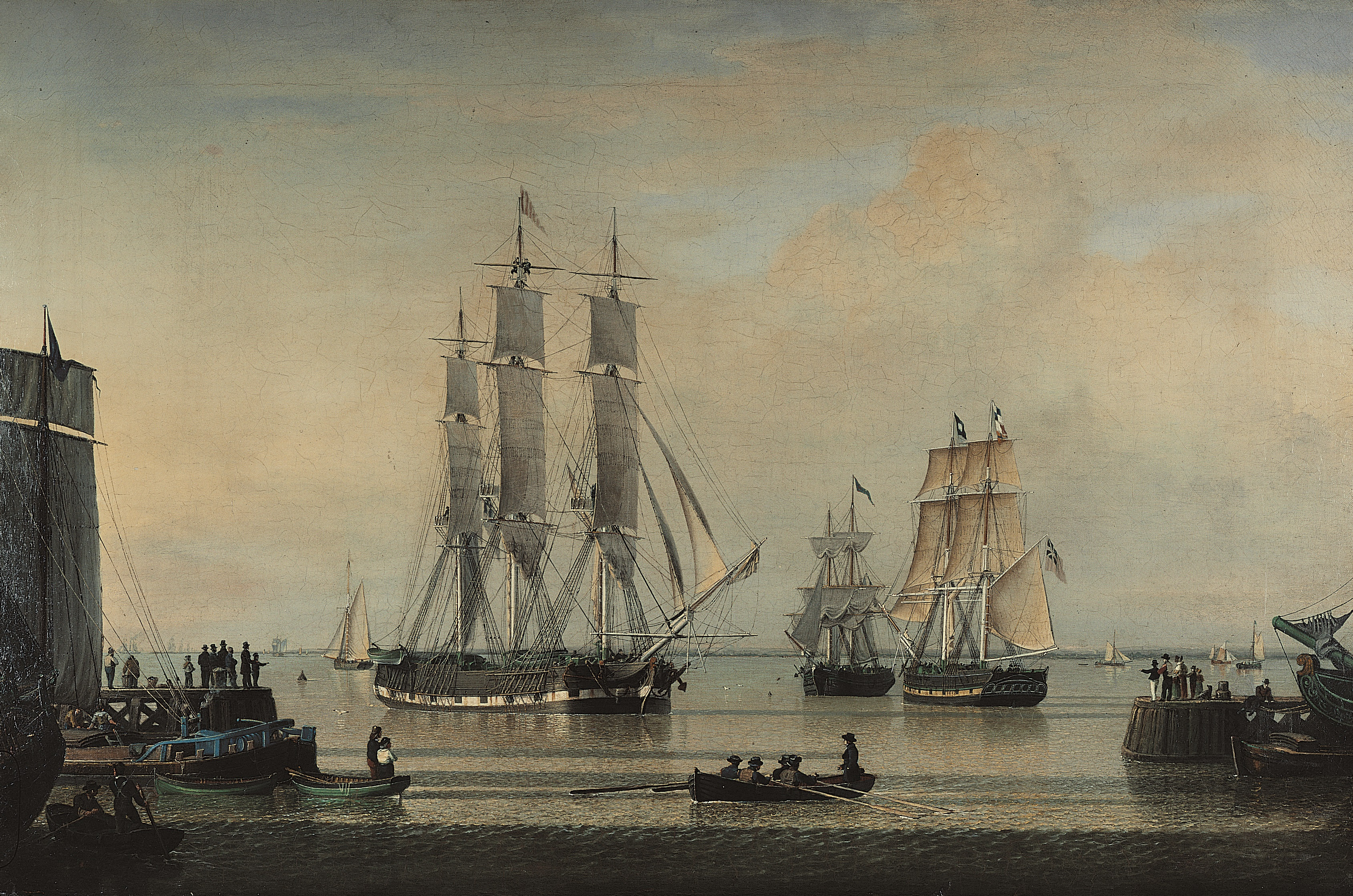
- William Lee at the Mouth of the Humber Dock, Hull, a painting, by John Ward

History

United Kingdom
- Name: William Lee
- Owner: 1831: Robert Lee and John Tall, merchants of Sculcoats (originally); 1836: Gee & Co. and/or Thomas Perronet Thompson
- Builder: Dickes & Gibson, Kingston upon Hull
- Launched: 17 January 1831
- Fate: Wrecked 5 December 1847

General characteristics
- Tons burthen: 367, or 36715/94 (bm)

William Lee was launched in 1831 in Hull as a whaler in the British northern whale fishery. She made six whaling voyages. In 1833, she participated in the rescue of the explorer John Ross, and his crew. After the collapse of the whale fishery, her owners sold her in 1836. Under new ownership, she traded more widely, to Russia, Calcutta, and North America. She was wrecked in December 1847.

== Career ==
William Lee first appeared in Lloyd's Register (LR) in 1831.

Year	Master	Owner	Trade	Source
1831	R.Hill	Lee & Co.	Hull–Davis strait	LR

William Lee then made six annual voyages to Davis Strait for her owners, Messrs. Lee and Tall, of Hull. The following data is from Coltish:

Year	Master	"Fish" (Whales)	Tuns whale oil
1831	Hill	3	45
1832	Hill	27	202
1833	Parker	28	199

In 1833, William Lee and Isabella spent the season in company and stayed on in the region after the other vessels there had left. Isabella and William Lee sailed about 100 miles further into Lancaster Sound than any other whaler had ever gone. There Isabella rescued John Ross, whose ship Victory had become beset by ice on Ross's second Arctic expedition. Ross stated that Humphreys was looking for Ross, expecting to find that Ross and his men had been lost. Humphreys disputed Ross's claim, stating that he, Humphreys, had been looking for whales. William Lee was still in company when Ross's boats reached Isabella. After Humphreys rescued Ross, Isabella continued whaling for about another month. Some of Ross's crew were transferred to William Lee.

Year	Master	"Fish" (Whales)	Tuns whale oil
1834	Parker	15	145
1835	Parker	3	
1836	Lee	1	

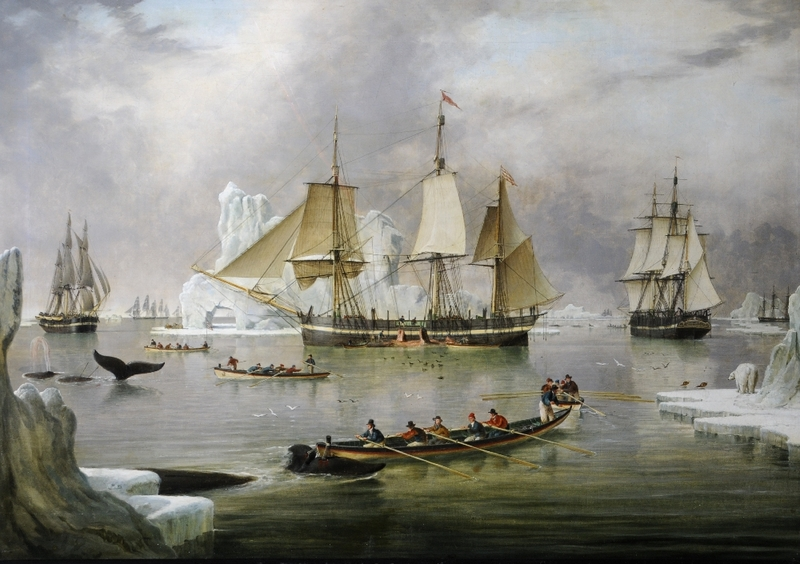
William Lee, in four positions, in the Arctic, by John Ward. (Note: Richard Hill, master of William Lee, commissioned the painting.)

Although 1833 was a good year for the Northern Whale Fishery, after 1834 whaling collapsed. After two disappointing seasons of whale hunting, William Lee's owners offered William Lee for sale on 5 December 1836.

Year	Ships	Ships lost	Tons of whale oil
1833	27	1	5024
1834	8	6	225
1835	2	0	51
1836	2	0	23.5

Between 1835 and 1836, several other whalers from Hull, such as Andrew Marvel, Jane, and Cumbrian left the whaling trade.

Year	Master	Owner	Trade	Source
1836	T.Hill; Shepherd	Lee & Co. Gee & Co.	Hull–Davis Strait; Hull–Petersburg	LR

In late 1837, William Lee took a cargo that included cotton from New Orleans and sailed for St Petersburg. She stopped at Elsinore where the Danish authorities insisted that the cotton go into quarantine for 40 days. The Danish Customs had received notice that yellow fever had broken out in New Orleans. Captain Shepherd presented documents that showed that the cotton had left New Orleans months before the notice, and that it had passed through Liverpool without incident. He left the cotton with Customs, which pocketed a fee of £1000 for the expense of holding it, and proceeded on to Petersburg. A vessel flying the Russian flag that also was carrying cotton from the same shipment from New Orleans was permitted to proceed. The newspaper report suggested that the difference in treatment was due to there being a Russian representative on the Danish customs board.

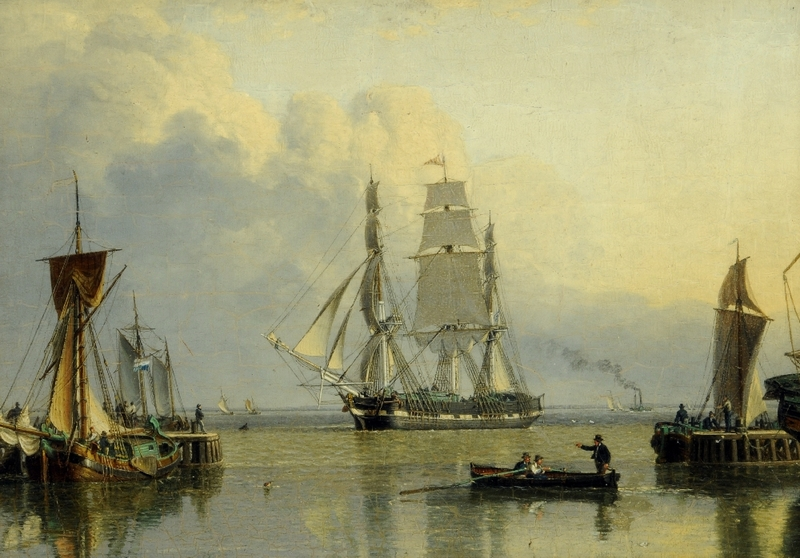
The Return of the William Lee from Calcutta, 1839

(Note: William Lee, Sheppard, master, sailed from Hull on 22 or 23 March 1838 and returned on 22 January 1839 to an enthusiastic reception from the people of Hull. As she returned she was flying the red and white striped pennant of Joseph Gee, agent.)

The opening in 1836 of the Hull Flax and Cotton Mill subsequently led her owners to send William Lee on several voyages to Calcutta. However, Joseph Rylands, the manager of Hull Flax and Cotton Mill, developed an associated fleet of sailing ships.

Year	Master	Owner	Trade	Source & notes
1838	Shepherd	Gee & Co.	Hull–Calcutta	LR; small repairs 1838
1845	Shepherd; Bennett	Gee & Co.	Hull–Calcutta; Hull–St Johns	LR; small repairs 1841, damages repaired 1843, & large repair 1846
1846	Bennett; T.Sykes	Gee & Co.	Hull–St Johns; Hull–New York	LR; large repair 1846 & damages repaired 1847

== Fate ==
William Lee, Captain Thomas Sykes, was driven ashore and damaged on 5 December 1847 on Öland, near Åkerby, Sweden. She was on a voyage from Saint Petersburg to Hull, with a cargo of deals, laths, and battens. The crew were saved.

She was refloated on 10 December and taken in to "Egvaag".

== Postscript ==
The William Lee was featured in the series "Ships of Hull" by Arthur Credland, published in the Hull Daily Mail on 23 February 1980.
