= Yount-Lee Oil Company =

- Predecessor: Yount-Rothwell Oil Company
- Founded: 1914; 111 years ago
- Founder: Miles Franklin Yount

The Yount-Lee Oil Company, founded in 1914, was the successor to the Yount-Rothwell Oil Company which had been formed earlier by Miles Franklin Yount and Talbot Frederick Rothwell. It was part of the Texas Oil Boom period.

== History ==
Yount headed up the new enterprise, and counted among his partners: Thomas Peter Lee, William Ellsworth Lee, Emerson Francis Woodward, Talbot Frederick Rothwell, John Henry Phelan, Beeman Ewell Strong, Frank E. Thomas, and Maximilian Theodore Schlicher.

With a new fusion of capital provided by T. P. Lee, Yount was confident that the Spindletop oil field in southeast Texas had not been tapped out, so he set about acquiring large tracts of land in the area.

In 1925, the company's No. 2 McFaddin well struck oil at about 2,500 feet, producing 1500 BOPD and sparking a second Spindletop oil boom. Subsequent successes made the company the largest Gulf Coast producer in 1927.

Yount went on to acquire mineral rights in several of the Gulf Coast's major fields. He also built the infrastructure necessary to ship his company's oil to destinations around the world from his headquarters in Beaumont, Texas.

Before his death in 1933, Yount, his business partners and associates, had built the company into one of the largest and most successful independent oil operators in the country. Within two years, on July 31, 1935, the stockholders sold Yount-Lee Oil Company for $46.2 million to Houston attorney, Wright Francis Morrow, who immediately began to parcel off the assets. Stanolind Oil, later a part of Amoco, bought most of the oil inventory and oil-producing properties for over $41 million, which at the time represented one of the largest financial transactions in American business history.
