= Will Hogg =

American attorney and developer

- Born: William Clifford Hogg; January 31, 1875; Quitman, Texas, U.S.
- Died: September 12, 1930 (aged 55)
- Resting place: Oakwood Cemetery, Austin, Texas, U.S.
- Occupation: Attorney
- Known for: A political feud with Governor James "Pa" Ferguson; developer of River Oaks, Houston
- Parent(s): James Stephen "Big Jim" Hogg and Sallie (Stinson) Hogg
- Relatives: Ima Hogg (sister), Mike Hogg (brother)

William Clifford Hogg (January 31, 1875 – September 12, 1930) was an American attorney, developer, civic activist, and philanthropist.

== Early life ==
William Clifford Hogg was born on January 31, 1875, in Quitman, Texas, the eldest child of Sallie (Stinson) Hogg and James Stephen "Big Jim" Hogg. Jim joined the Texas bar not long after the birth of his first son. Hogg grew up as his father pursued a political career, first gaining election as Wood County attorney in 1878, District Attorney in 1880, and Texas Attorney General in 1886. Three younger siblings were born during this time: Ima Hogg (c. 1882), Michael (1885), and Thomas Elisha (1887). The family moved to Austin in 1886, when Jim accepted his first statewide position, first living in a boarding house before moving into their own single-family house on Fourteenth Street. Hogg was 15 years-old when they moved into the Governor's Mansion.

Hogg attended public schools, and briefly attended a secondary school near Tyler, Texas, before enrolling at Southwestern University. He considered a career in ministry, though he changed his curriculum at the University of Texas, where he earned a law degree in 1897.

== Career ==
After graduation, Hogg worked as an attorney in San Antonio, Austin, and St. Louis.

Hogg worked for and was a friend of Joseph S. Cullinan and helped found the American Republics Corporation. In 1924, Hogg with his brother Mike and his old college friend, Hugh Potter, started a plan for an exclusive subdivision west of downtown Houston. They purchased 1,200 acres (490 ha) of land, which included a fledgling country club. Rather than just acting as subdividers of suburban lots, they adopted an approach of "comprehensive planning".
