= William Lee (priest) =

Irish Anglican priest

William Lee (20 October 1815 – 11 May 1883) was an Irish Anglican priest in the 19th century.

Lee was born in County Tipperary and educated at Trinity College Dublin. He was Archdeacon of Dublin from 1864 until his death.

== Works ==
- The Inspiration of Holy Scripture: its Nature and Proof, 8vo, London, Dublin [printed], 1854; 5th edit. 1882.
- Suggestions for Reform in the University of Dublin, 8vo, Dublin, 1854.
- Three Introductory Lectures on Ecclesiastical History, 8vo, Dublin, 1858.
- On Miracles: an Examination of the Remarks of Mr. Baden Powell on the Study of the Evidence of Christianity, contained in the volume entitled Essays and Reviews, 8vo, London, 1861 (republished in Faith and Peace, edited by G. A. Denison, 8vo, 1862)
- Commentary on the Revelation of St. John, 1882, forming the last part of the last volume of The Speaker's Commentary on the Holy Bible.
- University Sermons, with part of an Essay on Natural Religion, edited by G. Salmon and J. Dowden, 8vo, Dublin, 1886.

He also published pamphlets on the Episcopal Succession in Ireland and on the Position and Prospects of the Church of Ireland 1867.
