= Thomas Peter Lee =

American oil industry businessman

Thomas Peter Lee was born on March 19, 1871, in Petroleum, West Virginia to Alexander and Martha Jane Mount Lee. Thomas Peter Lee left school at the age of sixteen and went to work in the oil fields, first in his native state and then in Ohio. In 1903 he moved to Saratoga, Texas, where he gained employment with the newly formed Texas Company, which eventually became Texaco, and when he left that organization ten years later, he had attained the rank of general superintendent of production. While there, however, he became friends with J.S. Cullinan, and the two, along with Emerson Francis Woodward, Will C. Hogg, and James L. Autry, joined in 1914 to form the Farmers Petroleum Company, of which Lee became president.

== Sources ==
McKinley, Fred B., and Greg Riley. Black Gold to Bluegrass: From the Oil Fields of Texas to Spindletop Farm of Kentucky. Austin: Eakin Press, 2005.
