= Spindletop Hall =

Historic house in Kentucky, United States

- U.S. National Register of Historic Places
- Location within Kentucky Location within the United States
- Location: 3414 Iron Works Pike; Lexington, Kentucky, United States 40511
- Coordinates: 38°07′55″N 84°30′18″W
- Built: 1936-1937
- Architect: E.T. Hutchings
- Architectural style: Colonial Revival/Georgian Revival
- NRHP reference No.: 12000447
- Added to NRHP: September 20, 2012

Spindletop Hall, located at 3414 Iron Works Pike in Lexington, Kentucky, is the former home of Pansy Yount, wife of Miles Franklin Yount of the Yount-Lee Oil Company. It is currently the home of the University of Kentucky's staff, faculty, and alumni club, which was founded in 1962.

== History of Spindletop Hall ==
On November 14, 1925, Frank Yount struck oil at the Spindletop field in Beaumont, Texas. The field, which had basically played out since its original discovery on January 10, 1901, produced from new strata over 340,000 barrels (54,000 m^{3}) of oil an acre per year, pumping in excess of 50 million barrels (7,900,000 m^{3}) within 5 years. Now financially secure, Miles Frank and wife, Pansy, established in Beaumont a stable of American Saddlebred horses, quickly becoming recognized as a leader in the industry.

One day shy of the eighth anniversary of Spindletop's second discovery, Frank Yount died of a heart attack at age 53 on November 13, 1933. Left as the beneficiary of great wealth, Yount's widow, Pansy, mired in controversy in Beaumont, chose Kentucky as the place she would start anew. Spindletop Farm was established in 1935 on 836 acres (3.38 km^{2}) of land, known previously as Shoshone Stud Farm, owned by William Robertson Coe.

At a cost of one million dollars, construction of Spindletop Hall began in 1935 and took two years to complete. Mrs. Yount deemed the house to be a showplace of Kentucky, a modern mansion of classical architecture. When completed, the mansion housed 40 rooms, each with its own thermostat, 14 bathrooms, 133 full-size exterior and interior doors, 102 windows with screens of copper, and 11 fireplaces, all encompassing over 45,000 square feet (4,200 m^{2}) of floor space. At the time of its construction, the circular staircase and the 30X60 foot living room were the largest in Kentucky. Eventually, Mrs. Yount expanded the farm to 1,066 acres (4 km^{2}). On the property were seven miles (11 km) of metal fences, 17 houses for servants and farm hands, and 18 barns. There was a greenhouse, swimming pool, bath house, tennis court, two aviaries, and three kennels. Pansy Yount lived at Spindletop Hall with her adopted daughter, Mildred, and William Capers "Cape" Grant, her third husband and horse trainer. She was considered "new money" by the Kentucky Blue Bloods and was never accepted into their social circle.

During WWII she donated one of her husband Frank's Duesenberg cars to a local scrap drive.

In early 1959, Spindletop Farm was sold/donated to The University of Kentucky for $850,000. Mrs. Yount died in 1962. Also in 1962, Spindletop Hall became the residence of the University of Kentucky Faculty, Staff, and Alumni Club. The club's roster has grown from around 500 memberships to nearly 1800 families and individuals.

== Inside the mansion ==
=== The main floor ===
Grand Entrance Hall

At the time the house was constructed, the heavy bronze doors which grace the foyer (and a similar pair which open from the library to the porte-cochere) cost $14,000. The original imported rug was designed to match the elaborately molded plaster ceiling. The fretwork panels in the stairwells serve as echo chambers for the four keyboard Kimball organ in the music room. Slipcovers, which the owner never removed (this is also true for all draperies in the mansion), hid the Italian velvet draperies. The massive bronze chandelier, which was designed in Europe, was made in three separate sections. The wall panels were handpainted in themes representative of mythology.

Music Room

To the right of the Grand Entrance Hall is the Music Room. The Show Cabinet adjacent to the fireplace wall encased two Stradivarius violins, among other quality musical instruments like a Welte-Kimball automatic organ.

The walls are burled mahogany with ceramic trim. The mantel is made of imported marble. An Aubosson carpet (since replaced) complemented the paneled walls. The crystal chandeliers and wall sconces were made in Czechoslovakia.

Library

Steps lead from the music room to the Library. There were in excess of 7,000 volumes here prior to Mrs. Yount's donation of the property. The current collection is courtesy of gifts from the membership of Spindletop. The center of the room is a fireplace mantel which was removed from Trentham Hall in Staffordshire, England. The bronze doors lead to the porte-cochere. An Oriental rug, which cost over $40,000, originally laid over the hardwood floor.

Elizabethan Living Room (Oak Room)

Formal Dining Room

Kitchens

Informal Dining Room

French Powder Room

=== Upper level ===
Adam Suite (Manion Suite)

Louis XVI Suite (Yount Suite)

Mr. Grant's Room (Board of Directors Room)

The Colonial Room (Kentucky Room)

Linen closet

Guest Rooms and Baths (Administrative offices)

Spanish Room (Sales and Operations offices)
