= John Ross (Royal Navy officer) =

British naval officer and polar explorer (1777–1856)

Rear-Admiral John Ross CB RSO
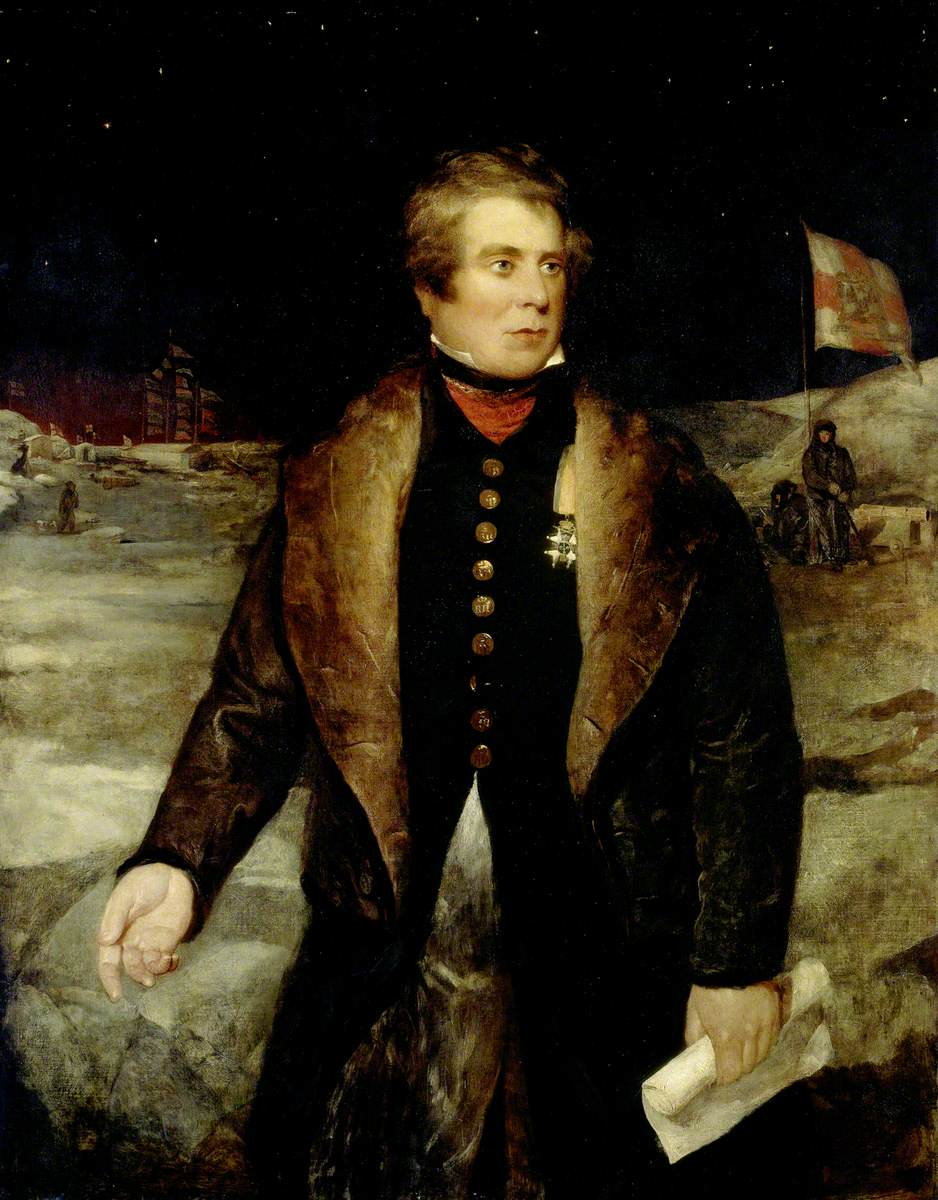
- Painting of Ross c. 1833

British Consul at Stockholm
- In office 8 March 1839 – 10 February 1846
- Preceded by: George Foy
- Succeeded by: Sir Norman Pringle

Personal details
- Born: 24 June 1777 Kirkcolm, Wigtown, Scotland
- Died: 30 August 1856 (aged 79) London, England
- Relatives: James Clark Ross (nephew)
- Awards: Knight of the Order of the Polar Star (1833); Founder's Medal; Companion of the Order of the Bath (1834); Knight Commander of the Order of the Sword (1834)

Military service
- Allegiance: Great Britain; United Kingdom; Sweden
- Branch/service: Royal Navy; Swedish Navy
- Service years: 1786–1856
- Rank: Rear-Admiral (Royal Navy)
- Conflicts: War of the Second Coalition; War of the Third Coalition; Anglo-Russian War

Rear-Admiral Sir John Ross CB RSO (24 June 1777 – 30 August 1856) was a British naval officer and explorer. He was the uncle of Sir James Clark Ross, who explored the Arctic with him, and later led expeditions to Antarctica.

== Biography ==
=== Early life ===
John Ross was born in Balsarroch, West Galloway, Scotland, on 24 June 1777, the son of the Reverend Andrew Ross of Balsarroch, Minister of Inch in Wigtownshire, and Elizabeth Corsane, daughter of Robert Corsane, the Provost of Dumfries. His family home was on the shore of Loch Ryan, at Stranraer.

=== Naval career ===
In 1786, aged nine, Ross joined the Royal Navy as a first-class volunteer and was assigned to HMS Pearl. It soon sailed to the Mediterranean Sea, where it remained until 1789. He then served aboard HMS Impregnable for several months before a transfer to the merchant marine for eight years. In September 1799 he was recalled to the Navy and appointed midshipman on HMS Weazel, which shortly joined in the Anglo-Russian invasion of Holland.

Short periods of service on HMS Clyde and HMS Diligence followed, during which he acted as a lieutenant.

From 1803, he served on various vessels; mainly with the Baltic station. This included a period on HMS Grampus and HMS Victory, the flagship of the commander of the Baltic fleet, Rear Admiral James Saumarez. During his service, Ross was wounded several times, the most severe of these being in 1806 when boarding a Spanish vessel; he received wounds inflicted by a sabre and bayonet, and also suffered broken legs and a broken arm. In late 1808, Ross was seconded to the Swedish Navy. In 1812, he was promoted to commander.

=== Arctic expeditions ===
==== 1818: First Arctic expedition ====
In 1818, Ross received the command of an Arctic expedition organised by the British Admiralty, the first of a new series of attempts to answer the question of a North West Passage. This entailed going around the extreme north-east coast of Canada and sailing to the Bering Strait. He was also to note the currents, tides, the state of ice and magnetism and to collect specimens he found on the way.

The expedition left London in April, with Ross commanding Isabella, a vessel that the Admiralty had hired, and accompanied by Alexander, another hired vessel, under Lieutenant William Edward Parry. Ross sailed anti-clockwise around Baffin Bay repeating the observations made by William Baffin two hundred years before. In August, he entered Lancaster Sound at the north end of Baffin Island; this later proved to be the eastern gate of the Northwest Passage. He sailed a number of miles west but went no further, for he was misled by a mirage known as iceblink that appeared to show mountains at the end of the strait. He named the apparent mountains "Croker Mountains", in honour of John Wilson Croker, then first secretary of the Admiralty. He then returned to England despite the protests of several of his officers, including Parry and Edward Sabine, who thought he should have more thoroughly examined the "mountains".

The account of his voyage published a year later brought to light their disagreement, and the ensuing controversy over the existence of Croker Mountains ruined his reputation. This expedition failed to discover much that was new. Its main effect was to open a route for whale ships to the northern Baffin Bay and provoke Parry to re-explore Lancaster Sound and find a major portion of the North West Passage. Ross attained the rank of captain on his return to Scotland, and about this time built the house North West Castle, in Stranraer, south-west Scotland.

==== 1829: Second Arctic expedition ====
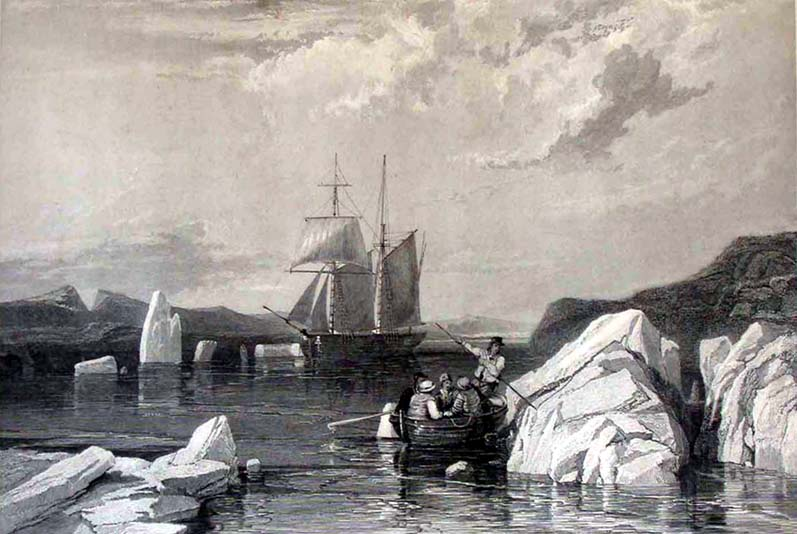
Victory's last time under sail, in the Gulf of Boothia, in what is now Nunavut, Canada, 1832

Parry, his lieutenant on the previous expedition, returned to the Arctic in 1819, and sailed 600 miles (970 km) west beyond the "Croker Hills", thereby discovering the Parry Channel – the main axis of the North West Passage. Partly to redeem his reputation, Ross proposed to use a shallow-draft steamship to break through the ice. The Admiralty was not interested, but he was able to convince the gin magnate Felix Booth to finance this second Arctic expedition, which began in 1829. His ship was the Victory, a side-wheel steamer with paddles that could be lifted away from the ice and an experimental high-pressure boiler built by John Ericsson. The Victory had been built in 1826 and previously had served as a ferry between Liverpool and the Isle of Man. The engine caused trouble and during the first winter, it was dumped on the shore. The ship carried four officers – John Ross, James Clark Ross, William Thom, surgeon George McDiarmid – and 19 men. The goal was Prince Regent Inlet at the west end of Baffin Island where Parry had lost his ship, the Fury, in 1825.

Ross left the Thames on 23 May 1829. Baffin Bay was unusually ice-free and on 6 August, he passed the point where he had turned back 10 years before. On 11 August, he turned south into Prince Regent Inlet, and on 13 August, reached Fury Beach, where Parry had abandoned his ship. The hulk was gone but there were heaps of stores on the beach, some of which he took. Continuing south he became the first European in the Gulf of Boothia, but by the end of September, he was blocked by ice 200 miles (320 km) south of Fury Beach. He took winter quarters at Felix Harbour at the eastern tip of the Boothia Peninsula. In January 1830, a group of Netsilik Inuit arrived and provided food and information. For one of them, the ship's carpenter made a wooden leg.

In the spring of 1830, James Clark Ross made several trips west into the interior. On 9 April, he reached the west side of the Boothia Peninsula and in May crossed over ice to the north west shore of King William Island, assuming it was part of the mainland. It was mid-September before the ice broke part of its grip. The crew sawed through the shore ice and warped the ship into open water, but it was soon caught in the ice. October was spent warping and sawing the ship into Sheriff Bay where they spent their second winter only three miles (4.8 km) from Felix Harbour. No Inuit arrived until the following April 1831. James Clark Ross crossed the Boothia Peninsula, and, on 1 June 1831, became the first European to reach the North Magnetic Pole. In August, the ship began to move but only managed to travel four miles (6.4 km) before it got trapped in Victoria Harbour. By January 1832, it was clear that the ship would never get out. Ross's plan was to drag the ship's boats north to Fury Beach, collect provisions there, find open water and hope to be rescued by a whaler.

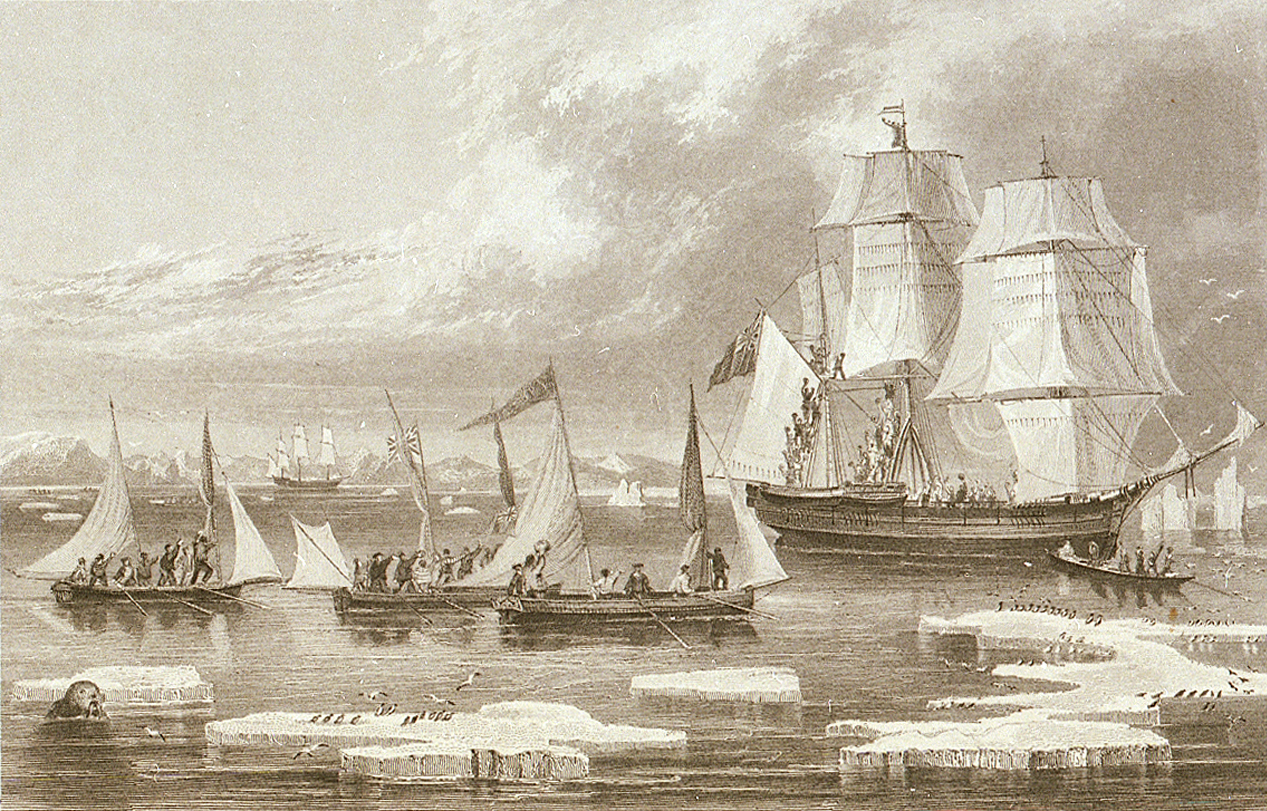
Isabella saves the crew of Victory, 1834

They left Victory on 29 May 1832. Ten days later, James Clark Ross returned from Fury Beach and reported that Fury's boats were repairable, which spared them the labour of dragging the boats. They reached Fury Beach on 1 July, left in three boats on 1 August, and reached Barrow Strait at the end of August. Finding an unbroken field of ice, they waited four weeks for the ice to melt, gave up, returned south, left their boats at Batty Bay, and walked to Fury Beach. On 8 July 1833, they left for Batty Bay and on 14 August, saw open water for the first time. They left the next day and reached the head of Prince Regent Inlet. On 26 August, they spotted a ship but it passed by. A few hours later, they were seen by another ship, which turned out to be Isabella which he had commanded in 1819. Had it not been for his 1819 discovery there would have been no whalers in the area. By October they were back in England.

The expedition had cost three lives. Ross was presented to King William IV and given a knighthood. The crew were given double pay for the entire four years by the Admiralty even though they were not in the Royal Navy. This impressive experience, as well as the scientific and ethnological information gathered by Ross's team, brought him the renown that he had long sought. In comparison with other contemporary arctic explorers, this was a feat of heroic proportions and was probably due to the fact that Ross befriended and learned from the Inuit.

"My steady and faithful friend, Mr William Thom, of the royal navy, who was formerly with me in the Isabella, beside his duty as third in command, took charge of the meteorological journal, the distribution and economy of provisions, and to his judicious plans and suggestions must be attributed the uncommon degree of health which our crew enjoyed; and as two out of the three who died in the four years and a half were cut off early in the voyage by diseases not peculiar to the climate, only one man can be said to have perished. Mr M'Diarmid, the surgeon, who had been several voyages to these regions, did justice to the high recommendation I received of him; he was useful in every amputation and operation which he performed, and wonderfully so in his treatment of the sick; and I have no hesitation in adding that he would be an ornament to his Majesty's service. Commander Ross, Mr Thom, and myself, have indeed been serving without pay; but, in common with the crew, have lost our all, which I regret the more, because it puts it totally out of My power adequately to remunerate my, fellow sufferers, whose case I cannot but recommend for their lordship's considerations. We have, however, the consolation that the results of this expedition have been conclusive and to science highly important, and may be briefly comprehended in the following words. The discovery of the Gulf of Boothia, the continent and isthmus of Boothia Felix, and a vast number of islands, rivers, and lakes; the undeniable establishment that the north east point of America extends to the 74th degree of north latitude; valuable observations of every kind, but particularly on the magnet; and to crown all, have the honor of placing the illustrious name of our most gracious Sovereign William IV on the true position of the magnetic pole."

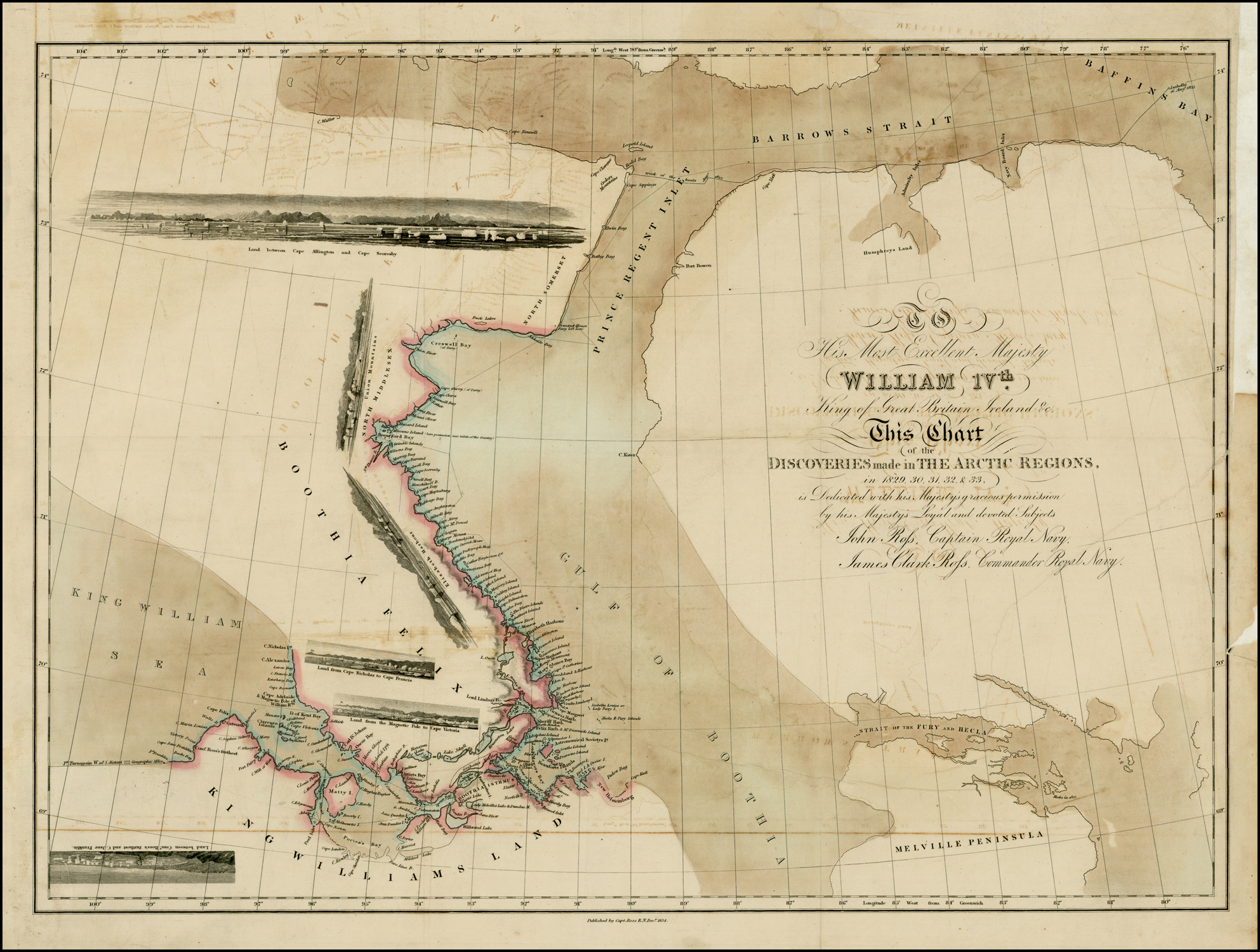
Map delivered by Ross to King William IV in 1834, showing discoveries from the expedition

Once again, however, Ross encountered controversy with his cartography. In 1830, during the expedition, James Clark Ross had charted three islands in James Ross Strait and named them the Beaufort Islands. John Ross never saw the islands. Later, back in England, John Ross, using his authority as expedition leader, renamed the islands as the Clarence Islands, and even added a number of fictional islands to the group, in an apparent attempt to impress the new king, William IV. In 1833, Ross received the Royal Premium from the Royal Geographical Society and a gold medal from the French geographical society, and various foreign orders, including Knight of the Royal Order of the Polar Star of Sweden, and in the following year, received a knighthood and was appointed a Companion of the Order of the Bath in Britain. He was appointed as British consul at Stockholm in 1839, and remained at this post until 1846.

==== 1850: Final Arctic expedition ====
In 1850, at the age of 72, Ross undertook a third voyage to the Arctic regions, this time in search of the expedition party of Sir John Franklin which had not been heard from for four years. With financial support from HBC, he sailed a private vessel, the schooner Felix, to Lancaster Sound. His vessel was not particularly robust and other ships in the area had to provide food to help Ross combat scurvy which had set in amongst his crew.

Failing to find Franklin or any of his men, Ross returned to England in October 1851 by way of Greenland, where he encountered rumours that Franklin and his party were all dead. Although most people disregarded these, Ross stood by them.

=== Later life ===
While he had been searching for Franklin, Ross was promoted to rear admiral. Retiring to Stranraer, Scotland, he never sailed again. His knowledge of the Swedish and Danish languages saw him consulting for the government about the Baltic regions as tensions with Russia increased and his later years were spent writing. He published several pamphlets, including one critical of the efforts to rescue Franklin.

He died on 30 August 1856 while visiting London, where he is buried at Kensal Green Cemetery.

== Coat of arms ==
Coat of arms of John Ross
Adopted 1905 Crest A fox's head erased proper; Augmentation: Over a downward pointing floating compass the Union Jack inscribed "1st June 1831" fesswise Escutcheon Gules, three estoiles in chevron between as many lions rampant Argent; Augmentation: On a chief Or, thereon a portion of the terrestrial globe Proper, the true meridian described thereon by a line passing from north to south Sable, with the arctic circle Azure; within which the place of the magnetic pole in latitude 70°5'17, and longitude 96°46'45, west, designated by an inescutcheon Gules, charged with a lion passant gardant of the Or; the magnetic meridian shewn by line of the Fourth passing through the inescutcheon with a correspondent circle, also Gules, to denote more particularly the said place of the magnetic pole; the words following inscribed on the chief, viz., "Arctæos Numine Fines" Motto Spes Aspera Levat (Latin for 'Hope Lightens Difficulties') Orders Order of the Bath; Order of the Polar Star; Order of the Sword

== Publications ==
- A voyage of discovery, made under the orders of the Admiralty, in His Majesty's ships Isabella and Alexander, for the purpose of exploring Baffin's Bay, and inquiring into the probability of a north-west passage. London: J. Murray. 1819. OCLC 4559652.
- Narrative of a second voyage in search of a north-west passage, and of a residence in the Arctic regions during the years 1829, 1830, 1831, 1832, 1833. London: A. W. Webster. 1835. OCLC 1113450.
