= Podunk, New York =

Hamlet in New York, United States

Coordinates: 42°31′27″N 76°39′46″W

Podunk is a hamlet located along Taughannock Creek in the town of Ulysses, Tompkins County, New York, United States, just south of Trumansburg.
