= Petroleum, West Virginia =

Petroleum
- Unincorporated community
- Location within the state of West Virginia Petroleum (the United States)
- Coordinates: 39°11′27″N 81°16′6″W
- Country: United States
- State: West Virginia
- County: Ritchie
- Time zone: UTC-5 (Eastern (EST))
  - Summer (DST): UTC-4 (EDT)
- ZIP codes: 26161

Petroleum (also Rogers) is an unincorporated community in Ritchie County, West Virginia, United States. Its elevation is 699 feet (213 m). Its post office closed on November 9, 2002, but the community still has a ZIP code of 26161. The North Bend Rail Trail passes through the community.

Petroleum was platted in 1854 when the railroad was extended to that point. The community was named after a nearby creek where oil naturally occurs.
