= Billy =

Billy most often refers to:

- Billy (name), (and list of people with the name)
- Billy (surname), (and list of people with the surname)

Billy may also refer to:

== Animals ==
- Billy (dog breed), a French dog breed
- Billy (pigeon), awarded the Dickin Medal in 1945
- Billy (pygmy hippo), a pet of U.S. President Calvin Coolidge
- Billy, a young male domestic goat

== Film ==
- Billy (Black Christmas), a character from Black Christmas
- Billy (Saw), a puppet from Saw
- Billy: The Early Years, a 2008 biographical film about Billy Graham
- Billy (2024 film), a Canadian documentary

== Literature ==
- Billy (novel), 1990, by Whitley Strieber
- Billy, a 2002 biography of Billy Connolly by Pamela Stephenson

== Music ==
=== Musicals ===
- Billy (musical), based on Billy Liar
- Billy, a 1969 Broadway musical with music and lyrics by Gene Allen and Ron Dante

=== Albums ===
- Billy (Samiam album) (1992)
- Billy (Feedtime album)

=== Songs ===
- "Billy" (6ix9ine song), 2018
- "Billy" (Kathy Linden song), 1958, by Kathy Linden
- "Billy", 1986, by Céline Dion from The Best of Celine Dion
- "Billy", 1973, by Bob Dylan from the Pat Garrett & Billy the Kid soundtrack
- "Billy", by James Blunt from Back to Bedlam
- "Billy", by Nik Kershaw from 15 Minutes

== Places ==
- Billy, Allier, France
- Billy, Calvados, France
- Billy, Loir-et-Cher, France
- Billy, County Antrim, a parish in Northern Ireland
- Billy-Berclau, in the Pas-de-Calais département
- Billy-Chevannes, in the Nièvre département
- Billy-le-Grand, in the Marne département
- Billy-lès-Chanceaux, in the Côte-d'Or département
- Billy-Montigny, in the Pas-de-Calais département
- Billy-sous-Mangiennes, in the Meuse département
- Billy-sur-Aisne, in the Aisne département
- Billy-sur-Oisy, in the Nièvree département
- Billy-sur-Ourcq, in the Aisne département

== Television ==
- Billy (1979 TV series), a CBS sitcom starring Steve Guttenberg
- Billy (1992 TV series), an ABC sitcom starring Billy Connolly
- "Billy" (Angel), a 2001 episode of Angel

== Other uses ==
- Billy (bookcase), sold by IKEA
- Billy (crater), on the Moon
- Billy (slave), African-American slave accused of treason
- Billy Beer, a beer brand popularized by Billy Carter
- Billy doll, a "gay doll" created in 1997
- Billy the Kid (1859–1881), American Old West gunfighter born Henry McCarty, also known as William H. Bonney
- Billycan or billy, a cooking pot used for camping

== See also ==
- Bili (disambiguation)
- Bill (disambiguation)
- Billi (disambiguation)
- Billie (disambiguation)
- Billy the Bus, a character in children's book series by Eileen Gibb
- Billy the Cat (disambiguation)
- Billy the Cat and Katie, superheroes from The Beano
- Blue billy, a ferrocyanide land contaminant, typically found around old gasworks
- Puffing Billy (locomotive), first commercial railway steam locomotive in the UK
- Will (disambiguation)
- William (disambiguation)
- Willy (disambiguation)
- William Lee (disambiguation), including Bill Lee
