= Billi (disambiguation) =

Billi is a 2000 Pakistani Urdu horror film.

Billi may also refer to:

- Billi (cat), a cat who displayed behaviors that may have been human-animal communication.
- Billi 99, a 1991 comic book series.
- Sir Billi, a 2012 animated comedy adventure film.
- "Billi Billi", a 2023 Hindi-language song.

== See also ==
- Billy (disambiguation)
- Bili (disambiguation)
- Bill (disambiguation)
