= Ape hybrid =

Ape hybrid could refer to:

- Koolakamba, legendary chimpanzee-gorilla hybrids
- Bili ape, real-life ape with characteristics intermediate between chimpanzees and gorillas
- Mangani, fictional ape with similar characteristics as the Bili ape from Tarzan
- Hobo, a fictional chimpanzee-bonobo hybrid in the novel Wake
- Humanzee, theoretical chimpanzee-human hybrid
