= Bili =

Bili may refer to:

- Bili, Azerbaijan, a village in Astara Rayon
- Bili, Democratic Republic of Congo, a town in north-central Democratic Republic of the Congo; Bili ape
- Bili Forest near the town, a complex mosaic habitat, rich in fauna typifying both savannah and forest habitats
- Bili ape, or 'Bondo mystery ape', a large chimpanzee living in Bili Forest
- Bili light, a medical therapeutic tool to treat newborn jaundice
- Bili, an ancient Chinese term (traditional: 篳篥; simplified: 筚篥) for the guan, a double-reed woodwind instrument
- Bilibili, a Chinese video sharing website (NASDAQ stock ticker BILI)
- Bilirubin, a breakdown product of heme catabolism found in bile and urine

== See also ==
- Billie (disambiguation)
- Billy (disambiguation)
