= Earring Magic Ken =

American toy

- Earring Magic Ken inside the product box; front side displayed
- Type: Fashion doll
- Company: Mattel
- Country: United States

Earring Magic Ken, also known as "Gay Ken" and "Fey Ken", is a model of the Ken doll introduced by Mattel in 1993 as a companion to its Earring Magic Barbie figure, one of five dolls in the Earring Magic Barbie line.

The doll is notable for inspiring a toy craze among gay men (including some claims that it was the highest selling Ken doll of all time) and for the controversy that ensued upon its debut.

== The doll ==
Mattel had conducted a survey of girls asking if Ken should be retained as Barbie's boyfriend or whether a new doll should be introduced in that role. Survey results indicated that girls wanted Ken kept but wanted him to look "cooler". USA Today noted after the American International Toy Fair that the doll Soul Train Jamal, from the Shani doll line, was also wearing an earring that year. According to manager of marketing communications for Mattel, Lisa McKendall, "We tried to keep [Ken] as cool as possible." This model of the Ken doll was dressed in a lavender mesh shirt, purple pleather vest, a necklace with a circular charm and, as the name indicates, an earring in his left ear.

These clothing choices led to gay commentator Dan Savage joking that Mattel toy designers had "spent a weekend in LA or New York dashing from rave to rave, taking notes and Polaroids." He also suggested that little girls' idea of coolness was shaped by homoerotic MTV music videos, Madonna's dancers, and what ACT UP/Queer Nation members were wearing to demonstrations and parties. Donna Gibbs told the San Francisco Examiner in November 1993 that the team of women who made the doll were surprised that gay men wanted him. Art historian Erica Rand and feminist writer Ann Ducille both cast doubt on this claim in 1995 and 1996 respectively. In 2021, former designer Carol Spencer told Mel Magazine that discussion about Earring Magic Ken's gay aesthetic did occur at Mattel. According to Spencer, "the male Mattel designer – who was married with several children and working on the project – sa[id] to me: 'They will turn Ken gay with this doll!'"

== Media reception ==
On February 11, 1993, Carol Lawson at The New York Times responded to his unveiling at the American International Toy Fair with the claim that Mattel was attempting to "gender bend" Ken by making him appeal to both boys and girls. She also suggested that selling Ken as gender non-conforming may have been a subtle apology for a Barbie with a voice box that said "Math class is tough!" in 1992. 1993 saw Mattel and other toy companies experimenting with selling girl toys to boys, and vice versa as a larger sales trend. Manager of marketing communications for Mattel, Lisa McKendall, told The New York Times "We never would have done this a few years ago. But now you see more earrings on men. They are more accepted in day-to-day life. We are trying to keep Ken updated." The article discussing Ken's "gender-bending" went on to be syndicated throughout North America, including the Seattle Post-Intelligencer, the Vancouver Sun, and the Philadelphia Daily News.

Several days later, Frank DeCaro responded to this article in Newsday, writing, "Ever since Mattel introduced Earring Magic Ken a few weeks ago, people have been wondering whether there's something more in the Dream House closet than a few Bob Mackie originals and some two-inch-wide [5 cm] hangers." He pointed out that other Ken dolls released recently, such as Sun Sensation Ken and Western Stampin' Ken, seemed to be "pushing the envelope of macho wardrobe acceptability" by wearing a crop top and chaps, respectively. Donna Gibbs, director of media relations at Mattel, emphasized that his look was not attempting to be controversial, saying, "Ken's still a clean-cut guy, but he's just a little more contemporary [. . .] Men are wearing earrings today, it's become a mainstream phenomenon. So Ken should have an earring, why not?" As with the New York Times article, this syndicated widely across North America.

Backlash against Ken's gender non-conformity followed shortly after. In another widely syndicated article, opinion writer Tom Zucco expressed extreme distaste for Ken's recent outfits in the Saint Petersburg Times. He referred to Ken's style transformation as "disturbing" and said that "Little girls of America need to know that most of us are not and never have been like Ken [. . .] In reality, most of us aren't very glamorous or flamboyant. We don't want to be glamorous or flamboyant. We can't even spell glamorous or flamboyant." Zucco purchased Sun Sensation Ken for his daughter (because Earring Magic Ken was not yet on sale) and remarked that her enjoyment of the toy must be due to "a slick marketing campaign by Mattel, peer pressure, and the fact that The World Is Going To Hell In A Handbasket!"

In the March 23, 1993 issue of gay magazine The Advocate, Denise Lessard suggested that gay men would soon be "paying more attention to [Barbie's] boyfriend Ken" due to his rebranding. She described Earring Magic Ken's outfit as "sport[ing] streaked hair, a mesh (!) top, neck chains, a purple leathery vest, and an earring." This March blurb in The Advocate (misidentified as a February blurb in several sources) would later be reported as the publication that suggested to gay men that they should buy the doll. Gay publication Genre also discussed the doll during this time.

In July 1993, Dan Savage wrote an article on Earring Magic Ken titled, "Ken Comes Out." He noted in his article that, in addition to his outfit's perceived flamboyance, his necklace resembled a chrome cock ring that some gay men were wearing as charms at the time. Amelia Jones considers the cock ring to have been the defining accessory of the doll that cast doubt on Mattel's insistence that it had no relation to gay fashion. Savage expressed feelings of ambivalence about Ken's new style, writing, "Queer Ken is the high water mark of, depending on your point of view, either queer infiltration of popular culture or the thoughtless appropriation of queer culture by heterosexuals [. . .] Queer imagery has so permeated our culture that from rock stars (Axl Rose and his leather chaps) to toy designers, mainstream America isn't even aware when it's adopting queer fashions and mores."

Despite the controversy, Donna Gibbs from Mattel told the Wall Street Journal in August 1993 that, "Everybody loves Barbie and we're pleased that [gay men] are finding something to enjoy in our products as well." However, by October 1993, Lisa McKendall was phrasing this statement to the Bay Area Reporter as, "if there are 'other people' who enjoy our product, of course we're pleased" and emphasizing that Ken was "wholesome." Donna Gibbs told the San Francisco Examiner in November 1993, "The Ken doll was not intentionally designed for any audience other than our primary one, girls ages 3 to 10."

Earring Magic Ken was a fixture in popular culture throughout 1993. He was joked about on The Tonight Show with Jay Leno and on the premiere of the short-lived Chevy Chase Show. The doll was awarded "Dubious Achievements of 1993" by Esquire alongside gaffes by baseball player Darryl Strawberry and actor Richard Gere.

== Consumer reception ==
Kitsch-minded gay men responded to this press by buying the doll in record numbers, making Earring Magic Ken the best-selling Ken model in Mattel's history. The doll debuted in stores for around $11 (equivalent to $25 in 2025) and had completely sold out by the Christmas season, largely due to gay men buying the doll in droves. Due to high demand, Chicago's FAO Schwarz created a wait list, and, allegedly, some shops in San Francisco began to sell Earring Magic Ken for prices ranging from $17 to $24 (equivalent to $38 to $53 in 2025). (The latter claim was disputed in the Bay Area Reporter in October 1993 by the general manager of San Francisco FAO Schwarz. According to him, only a few gay men were coming into his store, and Earring Magic Ken was selling better in New York and Chicago than San Francisco.) Earring Magic Ken was also popular with gay men in the United Kingdom, and sold well at the toy shop Hamleys in 1993. Toy scalper Mr. Barger told the Wall Street Journal in 1996 that Earring Magic Ken was so popular that he was able to re-sell him to specialty shops at premium prices. Richard Roeper, writing for the Chicago Sun Times, referred to him as "The Cabbage Patch Doll of the summer of '93."

A major appeal of the doll for many gay men was that Mattel did not market it to them on purpose. Rick Garcia, director of Chicago's Catholic Advocates for Lesbian and Gay Rights, told People magazine in 1993 that the stereotypical dress was funny to him because he believed it was an accident, and that it would have offended him if it was purposeful. In 1993, many newspapers interviewed individual gay men in California to understand the phenomenon. A San Francisco resident described Earring Magic Ken as, "a pariah setting foot in one of America's sanctuaries." Another California resident, Bill Harley, described Earring Magic Ken as, "A campy, funny thing to have." Laguna Beach resident Keith Clark-Epley had more reservations about the toy, saying that, "It's an uptight heterosexual male doll following gay fashion and who is still behind the times," and believed that calling the doll gay could potentially reinforce negative stereotypes about gay people.

In the ensuing decades, it has become common for news articles and trivia books to claim that Dan Savage's article is what led Mattel to discontinue Earring Magic Ken. This rumor first appeared in a 1994 review of Dan Savage's new radio show, "Strange and Stranger," in which the reviewer says that Savage scared Mattel into shelving the toy and was repeated in the 2005 book Brand Failures: The Truth About the Biggest Branding Mistakes of All Time. However, upon questioning by Ann Ducille in 1996 for her essay, "Toy Theory: Black Barbie and The Deep Play of Difference," Mattel denied that Earring Magic Ken was pulled from the market for reasons other than standard discontinuation practices. In the '90s, Mattel changed 98% of their Barbie line each year, and was distributing coupons for Christmas shopping to encourage sales of their toys as early as August 1993. No Earring Magic Barbie products (including the Barbie dolls that made up the majority of the collection) were sold after 1993. In 2021, the toy collector Cammy told Mel Magazine that the six-month window Earring Magic Ken was on the shelves was very normal for a seasonal fashion doll.

== Legacy ==
Earring Magic Ken has been displayed at several museums as an example of both gay pride and brand failures, including the Missouri History Museum, the National Museum of Play, the Fleming Museum, and the New York Historical Society. Earring Magic Ken appeared — with a changed necklace — as a character in the 2023 film Barbie, played by Tom Stourton, alongside Sugar Daddy Ken as a pair of discontinued Ken dolls.

== See also ==
- Gay Bob
- Billy doll
