= Sudbury Town =

Sudbury Town may refer to:

- Sudbury Town Underground station, a station on London Underground in Sudbury, London
- Sudbury Town F.C., a defunct football team from Sudbury, Suffolk, England

== See also ==
- Sudbury (disambiguation)
