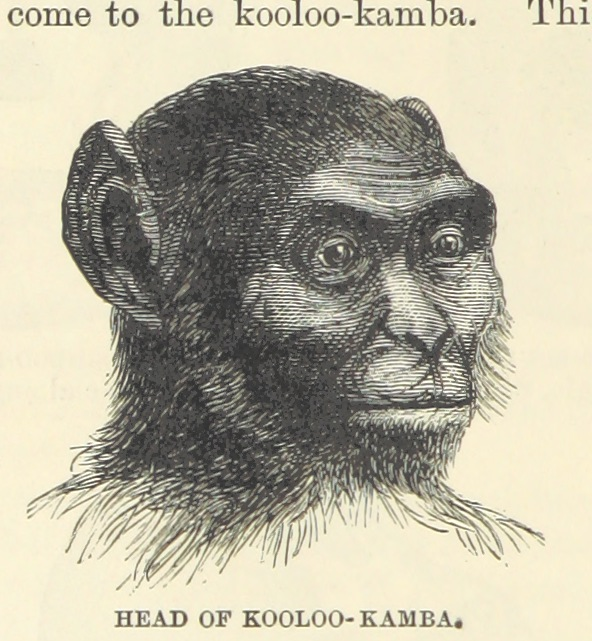
- The head of the kooloo-kamba Paul Du Chaillu shot in 1858.

Scientific classification
- Kingdom: Animalia
- Phylum: Chordata
- Class: Mammalia
- Order: Primates
- Superfamily: Hominoidea
- Family: Hominidae
- Subfamily: Homininae
- Hybrid: Pan sp. × Gorilla sp.

= Koolakamba =

Purported hybrid ape

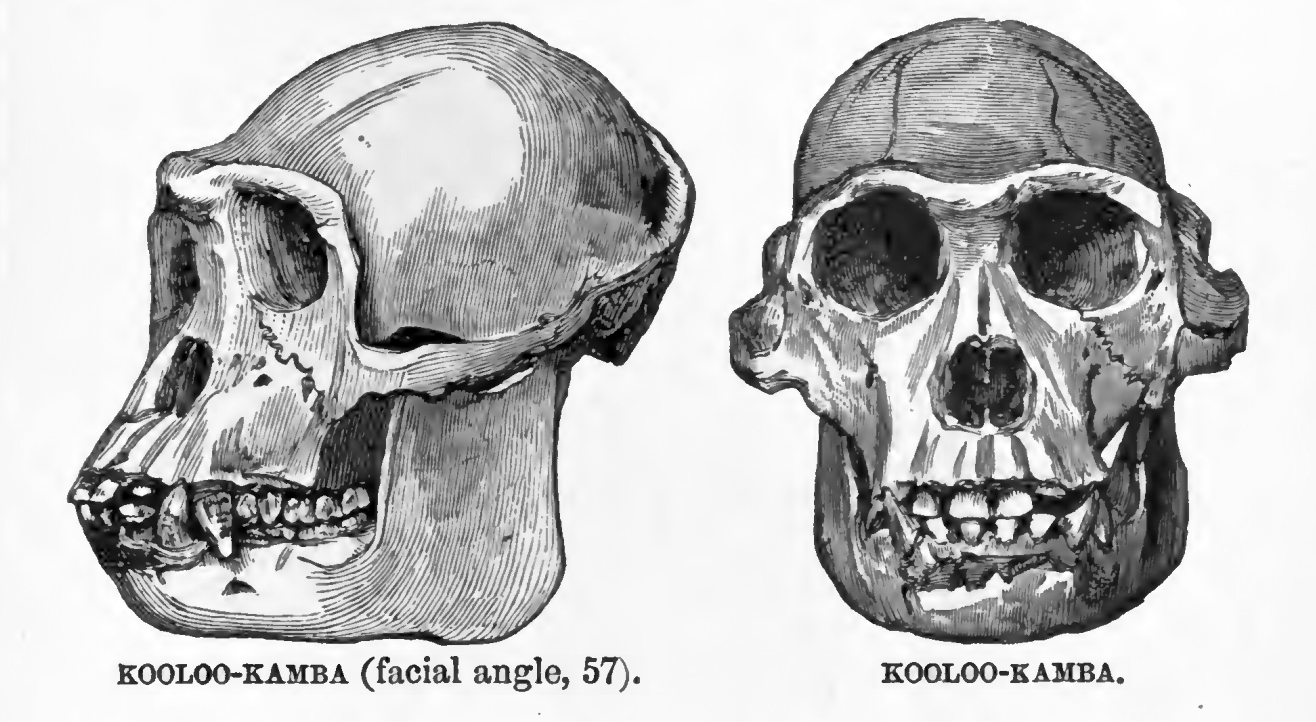
The skull of the kooloo-kamba Du Chaillu shot in 1858.

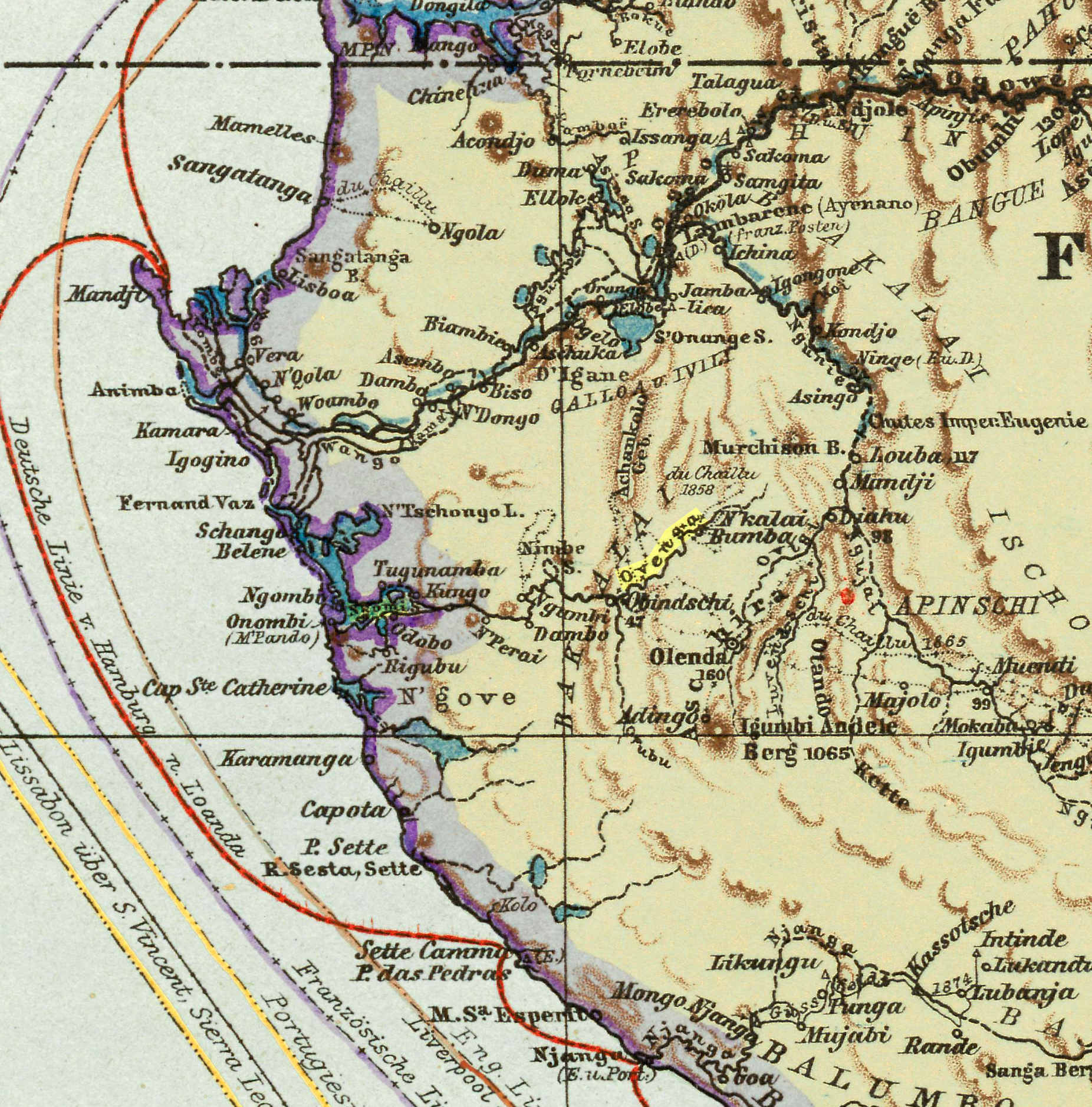
Map of Gabon from 1892 with the Ovenga River highlighted.

The Koolakamba or Kooloo-Kamba is a purported hybrid species of chimpanzees and gorillas. This alleged hybrid ape species has been reported in Africa as early as the mid 19th century. No empirical evidence has been found to substantiate the existence of the creature. The Koolakamba was referenced in the mid-19th century in French work by Franquet (1852, as cited by Shea, 1984) and in some descriptive work of Paul Du Chaillu from 1860, 1861, 1867, and 1899, some of which was republished in 1969 (Explorations and Adventures in Equatorial Africa).

== Origins of the name ==
Du Chaillu refers to the ape as Koolakamba based upon his description of words used by the indigenous peoples (Nkomi and Bakalai) in the region of the Ovenga River of West Central Africa, modernly Gabon. The people of Goumbi allegedly referred to the ape as "Kooloo" because that is what its unique vocalization, quite unlike the vocalizations of other apes in the region, sounded like to them. "Kamba", according to DuChaillu, is a Commi (Nkomi) word meaning "to speak".

== Description and distinguishing features ==
The Koolakamba is believed to be larger, flatter-faced, larger-skulled and more bipedal than a chimp; though, it may also be a mutation. According to DuChaillu (1861 and 1869), the physical characteristics described for Koolakamba include a short and broad pelvic structure, large supraorbital ridge, high zygomatic ridges, less prominent "muzzle", dentition in which the upper and lower incisors meet squarely forming a grinding surface, and a larger cranial capacity than that of the common chimpanzee. Much of what DuChaillu records is essentially ethnographic. He includes the indigenous names and lore relevant to the ape, descriptive text, and presumably accurate illustrations, but limited quantitative (mostly anthropometric) data.

== Discussion ==
Although there has not been a documented sighting of the Koolakamba or proof of its existence in modern times, in 1881 Koppenfelds claimed that it did indeed exist: "I believe it is proved that there are crosses between the male Troglodytes gorilla and the female Troglodytes niger, but for reasons easily understood, there are none in the opposite direction. I have in my possession positive proof of this. This settles all the questions about the gorilla, chimpanzee, Kooloo Kamba,....etc."

In November 1996, a picture of an unusual ape (taken by Peter Jenkins and Liza Gadsby at the Yaounde Zoo, Cameroon) was featured in the Newsletter of the Internal Primate Protection League (IPPL). This picture showed a seemingly hybrid ape with wider face and a larger skull than that of a chimpanzee and smaller than that of a gorilla. The ape in the picture had features that seemed to belong to both the gorilla and the chimpanzee.

Scientifically, it has not been determined if the Koolakamba is a subspecies of chimpanzee, a gorilla-chimpanzee hybrid, or perhaps simply a product of individual variation. Yerkes reported several "unclassifiable apes" with features intermediate between chimpanzee and gorilla in his 1929 book "A Study of Anthropoid Life." It is believed that these are regional races of chimpanzee classified as separate species by over-enthusiastic scientists.

== In popular culture ==
The Houston Zoo referenced the Koolookamba in their African Forest exhibit. The exhibit featured a storyline in which a fictitious explorer named Tommy tries to find it. Scattered throughout the exhibit are the faces of it like in rocks and trees.

== See also ==
- Bili ape
- Humanzee
- Oliver the chimpanzee
