= Sunbury =

Sunbury may refer to:

== Australia ==
- Sunbury, Victoria
  - Sunbury Downs College
  - Sunbury Pop Festival (1972-1975)
  - Sunbury railway station, Melbourne
  - Sunbury wine region

== Barbados ==
- Sunbury, Barbados

== Canada ==
- Sunbury County, New Brunswick
- Sunbury County, Nova Scotia (1765-1784), ceased to exist when the province of New Brunswick was created
- Sunbury, Ontario, a community within South Frontenac Township
- Sunbury (federal electoral district)
- Sunbury (provincial electoral district, 1785–1973)
- Sunbury (provincial electoral district, 1973–1994)

== United Kingdom ==
- Sunbury-on-Thames, Surrey, England

== United States ==
- Sunbury, Georgia
- Sunbury Township, Livingston County, Illinois
- Sunbury, Iowa
- Sunbury, North Carolina, an unincorporated community in Gates County
- Sunbury, Ohio, a village in Delaware County
- Sunbury, Pennsylvania, a city in Northumberland County
- Bangor, Maine, a city in Penobscot County; its proposed name was Sunbury at the time of its incorporation

== See also ==
- Sleeping Sunbury, fictional town in England
- Sudbury (disambiguation)
