= Bell the Cat =

Bell the Cat may refer to:

- Archibald Douglas, 5th Earl of Angus (1453–1514), Scottish nobleman also known as "Bell-the-Cat"
- Bell the Cat (Snowpiercer), television episode
- Belling the Cat, medieval fable also known as The Bell and the Cat

== See also ==
- Bill the Cat (disambiguation)
- Cat bell, bell worn on cats' collars
- Cat Bells, fell in the English Lake District
- Belling the Cat, 1998 collection of essays by Canadian author Mordecai Richler
- Bellingcat, investigative journalism group
