= Sudbury =

Sudbury may refer to:

== Places ==
=== Australia ===
- Sudbury Reef, Queensland

=== Canada ===
- Greater Sudbury, Ontario
  - Sudbury (federal electoral district)
  - Sudbury (provincial electoral district)
  - Sudbury Airport
  - Sudbury Basin, a meteorite impact crater and nickel mining district
- Sudbury District, Ontario, which surrounds but does not include Greater Sudbury

=== United Kingdom ===
- Sudbury, Derbyshire, England
  - HM Prison Sudbury
  - Sudbury Rural District 1894–1934
- Sudbury, Suffolk, England
  - Sudbury (UK Parliament constituency)
- Sudbury, London, England
  - Sudbury (ward)
- Sudbury, former name of Sedbury, Gloucestershire, England

=== United States ===
- Sudbury, Massachusetts
- Sudbury River, Massachusetts
- Sudbury, Vermont

== Military ==
- HMCS Sudbury, a Royal Canadian Navy corvette 1941–1945
- RAF Sudbury, a Royal Air Force station in Sudbury, Suffolk, England 1943–1945
- USS Sudbury, US Navy cargo ship 1918–1919

== People ==
- Sudbury baronets, a title of Eldon, Durham, England
  - John Sudbury (1604–1684), Dean of Durham
- Simon Sudbury (c. 1316 – 1381), an Archbishop of Canterbury (1375–1381) and Bishop of London

== Other uses ==
- A.F.C. Sudbury, a football club in Sudbury, Suffolk, England
- Sudbury Town F.C., a football club based in Sudbury, Suffolk, England 1885–1999
- Sudbury (TV pilot), based on the 1998 film Practical Magic
- Sudbury Valley School, in Framingham, Massachusetts, U.S.
  - Sudbury school, a type of school with direct democracy

== See also ==
- Sudbury railway station (disambiguation)
- Sunbury (disambiguation)
- Sudbury Neutrino Observatory, in Sudbury, Ontario, Canada
