= FluentPet =

American pet technology company

- Formerly: CleverPet
- Type: Private
- Industry: Pet technology
- Founded: 2020; 6 years ago
- Founder: Leo Trottier; Alexis Devine
- Headquarters: San Diego, California
- Products: FluentPet HexTiles; FluentPet Connect
- Revenue: $7,000,000 (2022)
- Website: fluent.pet

FluentPet, is a private American pet technology company that produces buttons that pet owners can program to play recordings which pets can press to associate with different actions.

Since the launch of its first product, FluentPet HexTiles in June of 2020, the company has reached over 100,000 households, and has sold over 2 million buttons.

== History ==
=== CleverPet (2013-2020) ===
In 2013, Dan Knudsen and Leo Trottier developed the concept of CleverPet, a game console for dogs after meeting in the UC San Diego campus. early tests began that year with Trottier's cat, Salk, who played the game "hot or cold", which called him over to a designated area in the room, and let him know when he approached the target. If he remained in the target for 5 seconds, he was given a treat.

In 2014, Trottier and Knudsen made a company (which would be predecessor of FluentPet) of the same name and started a Kickstarter campaign with a $100,000 dollar goal, which raised $180,000.

In 2016, CleverPet launched pre-orders for the CleverPet Hub, presented it at the Consumer Electronics Show (CES), and won first place at CES' LaunchIt competition.

=== FluentPet's origins (2018-2020) ===
The origins of the FluentPet system date back to 2018, when speech pathologist Christina Hunger, adopted a dog named Stella. She realized that Stella shared the same prelinguistic communication, resembling that of toddlers before they learn to talk. Because of this, she used AAC devices to help her dog "talk".

Leo Trottier, founder of CleverPet saw this in fall of 2019, due to the popularity of the trend known as the "talking button" trend. He developed an AAC soundboard system for pets, and in 2020, founded FluentPet.

=== FluentPet popularity and present (2020-present) ===
Videos of pets learning to "talk", commonly on TikTok and YouTube helped popularize FluentPet's communication system in the early 2020s. Notable pets that used the FluentPet system include Bunny, a sheepadoodle dog, Billi, a shorthair cat, and Elsie, a calico cat.

A research study known as TheyCanTalk, conducted at the University of California, San Diego by cognitive science professor Federico Rossano, has studied the use of sound buttons by pets. The project checks whether animals can associate buttons with specific words or meanings.

In 2023, FluentPet presented their product, FluentPet Connect at the 2023 Consumer Electronics Show, and was also launched for pre-orders.

== Products ==
=== FluentPet HexTiles ===
FluentPet HexTiles are the main product developed by FluentPet consisting of hexagonal tiles to hold programmable sound buttons to record words or short phrases, which pets may press to associate with different actions or activities to communicate with their owners.

Additional tiles and buttons can be added to expand the number of recorded words.

=== FluentPet Connect ===
FluentPet Connect is an accessory for FluentPet HexTiles that can send a pet's words as text messages via a mobile app. It was announced and scheduled for shipping in 2022, and was presented and launched for pre-orders at the 2023 Consumer Electronics Show.

== Awards ==
Year	Ceremony	Result	Product	Ref.
2022	Pet Care Innovation Prize	Won	FluentPet HexTiles	
2022	TITAN Business Awards	Won	(N/A)	
2023	CES Innovation Awards	Honoree	FluentPet Connect	
