= Billy the Cat =

Billy the Cat may refer to:

- Billy the Cat (Belgian comics), a Franco-Belgian comic strip published by Spirou
- Billy the Cat (British comics), a British comic strip and adventure story published by The Beano
- Billy the Cat (TV series), a Belgian cartoon series based on the Belgian comic strip of the same name

== See also ==
- Billy (disambiguation)
- Bill the Cat, a fictional cat appearing in the works of cartoonist Berkeley Breathed
- Billi (cat), a cat who displayed behaviors that may have been human-animal communication
