= Marzəsə =

- Municipality
- Location within Azerbaijan
- Coordinates: 38°36′N 48°46′E
- Country: Azerbaijan
- Rayon: Astara

Population
  - Total: 449
- Time zone: UTC+4 (AZT)
  - Summer (DST): UTC+5 (AZT)

Marzəsə (also, Marzasay) is a village and municipality in the Astara Rayon of Azerbaijan. It has a population of 449. The municipality consists of the villages of Marzəsə, Bili, Bio, and Sıhəkəran.
