= Billie =

Billie may refer to:

== People ==
- Billie (given name), the given name

== Other ==
- Billie (1965 film), a 1965 film starring Patty Duke
- Billie (2019 film), a documentary about Billie Holiday
- Billie (musical), 1928 Broadway musical by George M. Cohan
- Billie club or baton, a weapon often used by law enforcement
- MV Billie, an Ecuadorian coaster
- "Billie", a song by Pavement from Terror Twilight
- Billlie, a South Korean girl group

== See also ==
- Billy (disambiguation)
- Bili (disambiguation)
- Bill (disambiguation)
