= Bunny (dog) =

Canine research subject

- Born: c. August 2019; Washington, USA
- Known for: Intelligent use of AAC technology, TikTok videos
- Relatives: Alexis Devine (owner); Otter (dog brother); Tenrec (dog brother)

Bunny (born c. August 2019) is a sheepadoodle who has reportedly learned 92 words using a set of soundboard buttons, made by FluentPet, to "talk".

Bunny first rose to prominence when she went viral on video-sharing platform TikTok. Bunny has 8 million followers on TikTok as of September 2022. Bunny is currently the subject of scientific study by researchers at the University of California, San Diego. She is part of the TheyCanTalk study, and is monitored by cameras placed in the living room of her owner Alexis Devine.

== Biography ==
Bunny was born around August 2019. Her exact date of birth remains unknown. She is a sheepadoodle mix. Her owner, Alexis Devine, always planned for Bunny to learn how to talk. She researched communication and cognition in canines, as well as dog training. Devine also cited the work of Christina Hunger, a speech pathologist, who had been teaching her own dog to speak using augmentative and alternative communication. Hunger used programmable buttons that her dog, Stella, could then press in succession together to form "sentences", and used words such as "outside", "Stella", and "good". This prompted Devine to have her own button when she received Bunny in October 2019 for the word "outside", which Bunny learned to use with ease.

Six months after Bunny had mastered the use of her "outside" button, Leo Trottier, a cognitive scientist, reached out and asked if Devine would team up to use his product called FluentPet, an augmentative and alternative form of communication that utilized a word board with programmed buttons. Devine accepted, and the two then teamed up with researchers from University of California, San Diego. Bunny is the subject of a research project by the university's Comparative Cognition Lab, which has received funding from Trottier's dog game console startup CleverPet.

=== TikTok ===
Bunny has a TikTok account run by her owner that showcases videos of Bunny using her "keyboard" to speak. Her account currently has over 8 million followers, and over 210 million likes. One video posted on her account, of Bunny discussing her owner's missing cat, has exceeded 17.8 million views on the platform.

== Use of language ==
Bunny uses augmentative and alternative communication. She presses buttons on a mat, each programmed with a recording of a specific word, such as "Bunny", "walk", and "bye". Whenever these buttons are pressed, they play the words they are programmed to, similar to the Fitzgerald Key, a method used to teach deaf children sentence structure. Bunny can reportedly string at least four words together in broken sentences, such as "mad, ouch", followed by "stranger, paw"; that sentence resulted in her owner finding a thorn in Bunny's paw.

== See also ==
- Animal language
- Talking animal
- Evolution of language
- Yerkish
- Kanzi
- Alex (parrot)
- Billi (cat)
- Elsie (cat)
- Clever Hans
- Koko (gorilla)
