= Gay Bob =

Gay doll

Creator Harvey Rosenberg displays two Gay Bob dolls

Gay Bob is a doll created in 1977 and billed as the world's first openly gay doll. Bob was created by former advertising executive Harvey Rosenberg and marketed through his company, Gizmo Development. Gay Bob was bestowed with an Esquire magazine "Dubious Achievement Award" for 1978.

Bob stands 13 inches (33 cm) tall and was presented clothed in a flannel shirt, tight jeans and cowboy boots. He has one ear pierced. Bob's packaging box is decorated like a closet and included a catalog from which additional outfits could be ordered. Creator Rosenberg described the doll as resembling a cross between Paul Newman and Robert Redford. Bob is anatomically correct.

Gay Bob sparked outrage in at least one Ann Landers reader, who was inspired to write to decry the doll and predict that it would lead to the acceptance of other "disgusting" dolls like "Priscilla the Prostitute" and "Danny the Dope Pusher". Rosenberg had announced plans for a line of "permissive dolls", but no drug dealers or prostitutes. Ann replied that she would believe such a doll existed when she saw it in the stores, but that she was unlikely to see it in the sort of "respectable" stores she patronized.

== See also ==
- Earring Magic Ken
- Billy doll
