= Elsie (cat) =

Feline communication subject

- Born: c. August 2018; Chicago, Illinois, USA
- Known for: Intelligent use of AAC technology, Instagram and YouTube videos
- Relatives: Mary Robinette Kowal (owner)

Elsie (born c. August 2018) is a domestic cat owned by American author Mary Robinette Kowal who has reportedly learned over 120 words using a set of soundboard buttons, made by FluentPet, to "talk".

== Biography ==
Elsie was born circa August 2018 and adopted from Chicago's Critical Animal Relief Foundation in 2019. She is a calico cat with a unique hind leg that does not tuck under when she sits. Her name is both a derivation of the initials for Little Cat (L.C.), and a reference to Elsie MacGill, the first woman to receive a degree in aeronautical engineering. Videos of Elsie using her sound board have been posted to YouTube and Instagram.

Elsie is often mentioned in scifi writer Mary Robinette Kowal’s interviews, not only for the cat's use of the communication buttons, but for insights Kowal has gained in interspecies communication as a subject for her writing. Kowal was inspired by researchers such as Christina Hunger, a speech pathologist, who had been teaching her dog, Stella, to speak using augmentative and alternative communication.

== Use of language ==
Elsie uses augmentative and alternative communication in a similar manner as Bunny the dog and Billi the cat, participants in the University of California, San Diego research project TheyCanTalk. She presses buttons on a mat, each programmed with a recording of a specific word, such as "bored", "open", "scritches" and "sorry". Whenever these buttons are pressed, they play the words they are programmed to, similar to the Fitzgerald Key, a method used to teach deaf children sentence structure. Elsie can reportedly string words together, such as "laser bird" to request a toy, and "human litter box" as a curse.

== See also ==
- Bunny (dog)
- Billi (cat)
- Animal language
- Talking animal
- Evolution of language
- Yerkish
- Kanzi
- Alex (parrot)
- Clever Hans
- Koko (gorilla)
