= Bio, Azerbaijan =

Bio
- Village
- Location within Azerbaijan
- Coordinates: 38°36′N 48°46′E
- Country: Azerbaijan
- Rayon: Astara
- Municipality: Marzəsə
- Time zone: UTC+4 (AZT)
  - Summer (DST): UTC+5 (AZT)

Bio is a village in the municipality of Marzəsə in the Astara Rayon of Azerbaijan.

== Etymology ==
The correct name of the place name should be Bi'aov. The name of the settlement is derived from the Talysh words bi'a "cold" and ov "water" (Soyugsu village).

Bi'u is a village in the Siyaku administrative unit of Astara district. It is located in the Lankaran lowland. The village takes its name from the name of a nearby mineral spring. Originally Buy'aov, this hydronym is composed of the Talysh words buy (smell, smell) and ov (water), meaning "smelly, fragrant water".
