= Karl Ammann =

Swiss photographer (born 1948)

- Born: 1948 (age 77–78); St. Gallen, Switzerland
- Occupations: Conservationist, Author, Wildlife Photographer, Documentary Producer
- Awards: BBC Wildlife Photographer of the Year, World In Our Hands Award (1996-2000); Genesis Awards Brigitte Bardot International Award for The Mong Lah Connection

Academic background
- Education: Cornell University

Karl Ammann is a Swiss conservationist, wildlife photographer, author and documentary film producer. He initiated a campaign focusing on the African bush meat trade, which gained worldwide attention. As a conservation activist, he has specialized in investigative journalism involving undercover exposés dealing with the illegal wildlife trade. In the process, he has exposed NGOs and international conventions for their lack of effectiveness and the promotion of feel-good tales.

For his work, he has received numerous awards, including TIME Magazine Heroes of the Environment, The Dolly Green Award, Media Asia Advertising Awards, Chimfunshi Pal Award for Environmental Issue Photography, and three Genesis Awards by the Humane Society of America. For four years in a row, he won the BBC Wildlife Photographer of the Year in the World in our Hands category. In 2008, he received Best Conservation Film award by the International Wildlife Film Festival.

== Early life and education ==
Ammann was born in St. Gallen, Switzerland in 1948. He attended The St. Gall School of Economics until 1972, and then graduated in hotel management from Cornell University in 1974. He moved to Kenya to work with Intercontinental Hotels and his first six months were spent in Zaire seconded to the government to assist with the planning and execution of the Rumble in the Jungle. In 1978, three years later he moved to Cairo to manage a Mövenpick Hotel.

== Career ==
Ammann started his career as a photographer in the early 1980s in Africa. Initially, he focused on photographing cheetahs, but later turned to work on great apes and conservation issues affecting great apes. Between 1983 and 1986, he set up a luxury eco-tourism camp in the Maasai Mara and another on the Zaire side of the Virunga Mountains. In 1988, he sold his shares in these camps to focus on photography. During a journey up the Congo River, he witnessed the bushmeat trade and spent the following two decades campaigning to highlight the trade and its impact on a wide range of species. He traveled to many of the African ape range states and visited numerous orphan sanctuaries while researching the effects of the bushmeat trade on apes. As part of this research, he began the development of the Sweetwaters Chimpanzee sanctuary in Kenya. In 1995 he initiated a campaign with the European Association of Zoos and Aquaria (EAZA), which resulted in a petition of 2 million signatures being presented to the European Parliament. He then created a great ape research project in the Bili Uere area of Northern DRC which resulted in the initial data on a unique chimpanzee population now known as the Bili ape. These projects led to additional conservation projects dealing with the ongoing poaching of elephants in the largest of protected areas in Central Africa.

== Works ==
Ammann is the co-author and photographer of two books, entitled Consuming Nature, and Eating Apes, and has also authored/co-authored several photo-essay books, including; Orangutan Odyssey, Great Ape Odyssey, Little Bull: Growing Up in Africa’s Elephant Kingdom, Maasai Mara, Gorilla and The Hunters and the Hunted. His works in the field have been featured on various media platforms including; The New York Times Magazine, The Sunday Times Magazine, STERN, National Geographic’s Earth Almanac, Asian Geographic, SINRA, SWARA, International Wildlife, Natural History, Focus (Germany), and Air one (Italy), among others. His works regarding the trade of wildlife products have also been featured in several National Geographic photo galleries.

Ammann has provided a range of exposes to National Geographic Online News, YAHOO News, and Trade Secrets, and has produced TV programs on the bush meat issue for UK Channel Four, CNN, National Geographic, M-Net Carte Blanche and BBC Newsround. In his series Wildlife Wars for Spiegel and Stern TV, he illustrated and discussed several aspects of the bushmeat and pet trade, and highlighted the issue of smuggling of chimpanzees and gorillas into private collections in the Middle East, as well as to zoos and safari parks in China

His most recent project has centered around exposing the tiger farming industry in Asia with a feature-length documentary on Amazon Prime Europe.

== Bibliography ==
=== Books ===
- Cheetah (1984) ISBN 9780668062596
- The Hunters & the Hunted (1989) ISBN 9780370312392
- Die großen Menschenaffen (Photography) (1992) ISBN 9783405152963
- Maasai Mara (1990) ISBN 9780134718712
- Gorillas (1997) ISBN 9781868126958
- Little Bull: Growing Up in Africa's Elephant Kingdom (1998) ISBN 9780806920986
- Orangutan Odyssey (Photography) (1999) ISBN 978-0810936942
- Great Apes and Humans: The Ethics of Coexistence (2001) ISBN 9781560989691
- Eating Apes (2003) ISBN 9780520230903
- Great Ape Odyssey (Photography) (2005) ISBN 9780810955752
- Consuming Nature, Altisima Press, 2005 (A photographic title)
- Elephant Reflections, (Photography) (2009) ISBN 9780520253773
- Giraffe Reflections, (Photography) (2013) ISBN 9780520266858

=== Selected articles ===
- The Washington Post Tiger Farming expose
