= Bili Forest =

Coordinates: 4°09′N 25°10′E

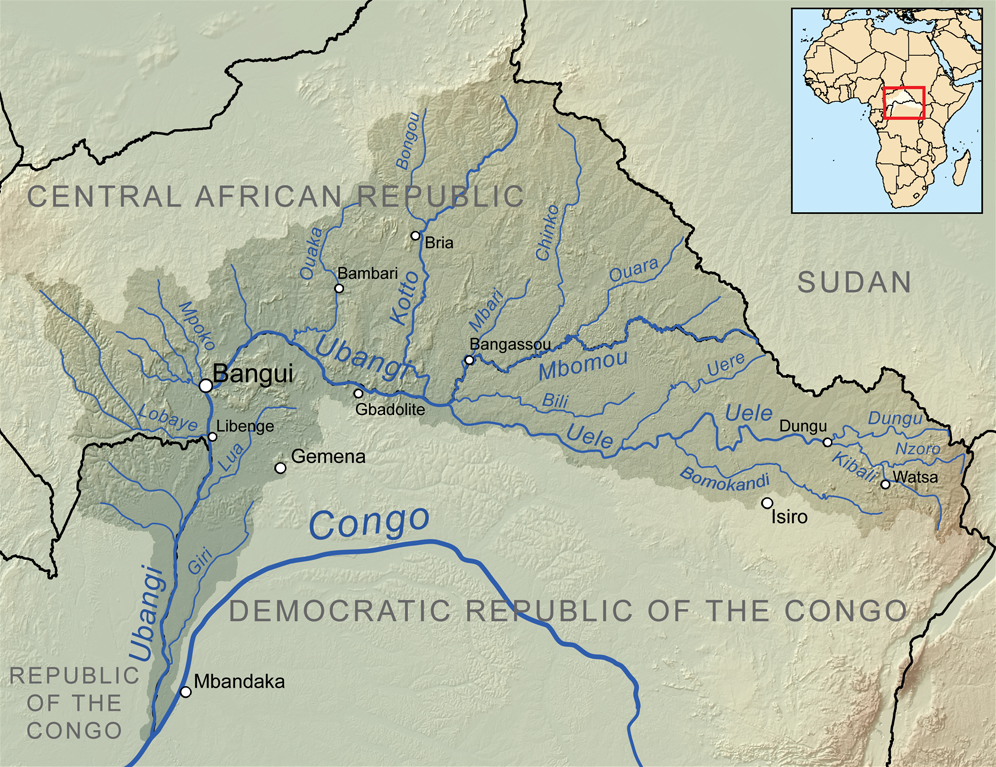
Ubangi river map

Bili (coordinates 4°9'N 25°10'E), which is about 200 km east of Bondo and 250 km north of Buta, is a city in the Bas-Uélé District in the northern Democratic Republic of the Congo in Central Africa. It lies along the Bili river, a tributary of the Ubangi river. It lies 50 km south of the Mbomou river, which forms the border with the Central African Republic. It is situated to the north of the Uélé river. The town has existed since at least 1908. It sits on land covered in marshlands, swamps and savannah, with patches of forest, while to the south of the Uélé lies dense unbroken rainforest. The local populace of the greater area are Azande. In 2005, a Time reporter found the region was highly undeveloped due to war and neglect. Bicycles were the main mode of transport at the time. Gold was found in the region, attracting many prospectors in 2006–2007.

The troubles in the neighbouring country of the Central African Republic have caused a large number of people to cross the nearby Mbomou river to seek refuge here. In 2015, a UNHCR refugee camp for 4,000 was set up in a near-by village. There was not enough to eat. As of 2020 the refugee camp now houses 10,000 people from CAR. There are also numerous informal refugee camps along the border on the near bank of the Mbomou and Ubangi, such as Baladamo Rive, housing 90,000 people in makeshift shelters. Malaria is a problem. The UNHCR is trying to convince these refugees to decamp to Bili.

In 2016, the WHO registered a cholera outbreak in Bili.

In 2014, the Africa Wildlife Foundation (AWF) declared the entire region from the Uélé to the Mbomou to be the 'Bili–Mbomu Forest Savanna Mosaic'. They also call the region the 'Bili-Uele Protected Area'. The government of the DRC does not recognise these entities. In 2015, the AWF complained of artisanal miners and indigenous Mbororo people crossing the river from the north, as they survive as cattle herdsmen and might hunt animals, as well as the Lord's Resistance Army, an extremist Christian militia. In early 2015, the NGO brought in Maisha Group Ltd., a commando training company, which established a field office in Bili. The plan was to train a group of twenty to thirty rangers to patrol the region for the AWF and the Institut Congolais pour la Conservation de la Nature (ICCN), an independent partner for the DRC government. The AWF planned to talk to local 'stakeholders' and 'intruders' at a later date. As of 2019, the AWF uses UAV technology and spatial modelling to protect the wildlife in the area, funded by western charities.

Bili can be reached by light plane, boat, and by vehicles on unpaved roads.

== Natural history ==
The region around Bili, between the Ubangi river to the northwest and the Uélé river to the south, was studied in the early 2000s by scientists interested in common chimpanzees. In 2003, an American controversially claimed to have maybe discovered a dangerous new species of great ape here, but her claims were debunked.

At least in the early 2000s, the wider area has elephants, lions, hyenas and leopards.

The Domaine Chasse Bili Uere is a hunting preserve in the area. The Uéré is another river further to the east. Garamba National Park lies even further east from that. As of 2017, the ICCN has rangers installed at Bili Uéré.
