= Ann duCille =

American English professor

Ann duCille is a professor emerita of English at Wesleyan University who is a scholar of African-American literature, cultural studies, and Black feminist theory. Born in Brooklyn, New York, duCille earned a Bachelor of Arts degree from Bridgewater State College and then a master's degree and PhD in American Studies from Brown University.

== Biography ==
duCille began her career at Hamilton College in 1974 where she and two others became the first three Black women faculty on staff. In 1990, duCille joined the faculty of Wesleyan University and later also worked at the University of California, San Diego. duCille was awarded a Guggenheim Fellowship in 1994, in recognition of her research on popular culture.

In 2016, duCille became the Inaugural Distinguished Professor in Residence for the Black Feminist Theory Project at the Pembroke Center, Brown University. duCille currently serves as an advisor to that project, which is a visiting scholar initiative that invites black feminist theorists to campus each year. She is also a curatorial advisor to the Pembroke Center's Feminist Theory Archive in regard to the papers of black feminist theorists.

Bridgewater State College, now University, celebrated duCille's tremendous contributions to the field of literary studies and popular culture with an honorary degree in 2008.

== Publications ==
- Coupling and convention : marriage, sex, and subjectivity in novels by and about African American women, 1853-1948, 1991
- The coupling convention : sex, text, and tradition in Black women's fiction, 1993
- The occult of true black womanhood : critical demeanor and black feminist studies, 1994
- Dyes and dolls : multicultural Barbie and the merchandising of difference, 1994
- Skin trade, 1996
- Where in the world is William Wells Brown? : Thomas Jefferson, Sally Hemings, and the DNA of African- American literary history, 2000
- Technicolored : reflections on race in the time of TV, 2018.
