= Sudbury Reef =

Coordinates: 17°00′02″S 146°04′44″E

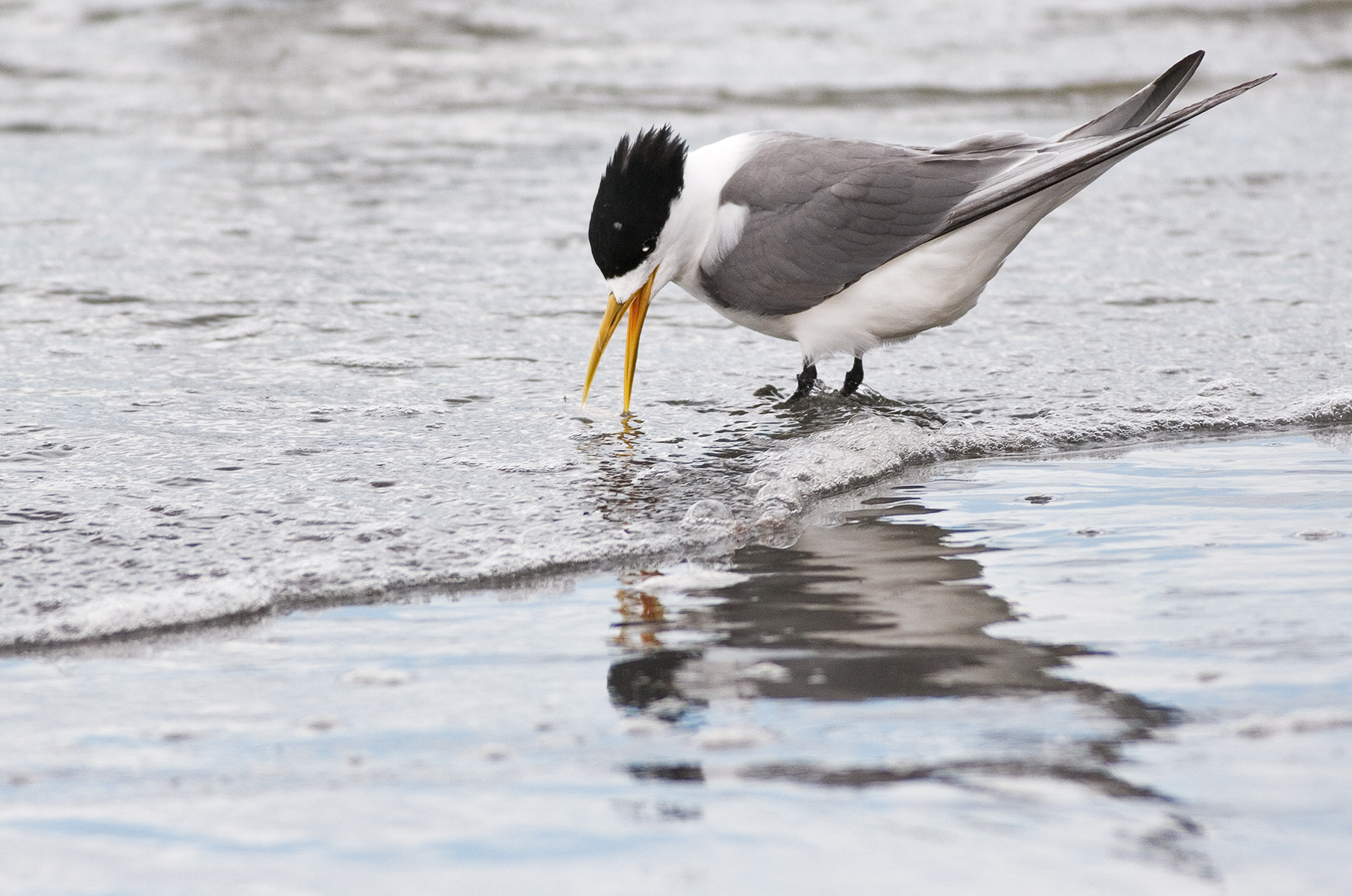
The reef is an important nesting site for lesser crested terns

Sudbury Reef is a small coral reef, with a few unnamed cays but no substantial islands, lying about 20 km off the east coast of Far North Queensland, Australia. It is part of the Great Barrier Reef Marine Park at about the same latitude as Cairns.

== Birds ==
The reef has been identified as an Important Bird Area (IBA) by BirdLife International because its cays, with a collective land area of about a hectare, have supported over 1% of the world population of lesser crested terns (with up to 5000 nests recorded).
