= Billy doll =

Adult-oriented doll

Billy in his "BPS" outfit

Billy – The World's First Out and Proud Gay Doll (a.k.a. The Billy Doll and Billy the Gay Doll) was a doll introduced in the US in 1997. Marketed for adults, the doll is anatomically correct, featuring an oversized penis. Billy was created by artists John McKitterick and Juan Andres, and marketed by London-based Totem International Ltd and New York-based Totem International Inc. as "the first out and proud gay doll", although that distinction actually belongs to Gay Bob, introduced in 1977.

== History ==
=== Sculpture ===
John McKitterick and Juan Andres created Billy based on sketches they drew while living in London. In 1992, they produced Billy, a fine art sculpture, in what was a highly politicized period in gay history and first exhibited Billy at a London Arts Benefit for AIDS in November 1994. A work of conceptual art, Billy championed diversity, gay visibility, safe sex and AIDS awareness. Once exhibited Billy received extensive media attention all around the world, originally 1200 limited editions of the Billy sculpture were created.

=== Doll ===
In 1997, three years after the exhibition of the original sculpture, McKitterick and Andres worked with the marketing company Totem International to launch a mass-produced doll called Billy, "The World's First Out and Proud Gay Doll". A deluxe adult male doll, standing 13 inches (33 cm) in height and weighing 11.3 oz (320 g), Billy was molded from superior quality vinyl. Using rotational molding, the doll is made up of five individual body parts with no seaming, which makes it possible for Billy to move and for him to be posed in many positions.

Billy was first launched into the market with a choice of five outfits; all with removable boots. The names of the outfits were both descriptive and self-explanatory; Master Billy, Cowboy Billy, Wall Street Billy, Sailor Billy and San Francisco Billy. Each outfit was executed with realism in mind. Other dolls in the Billy line include Carlos, Billy's Puerto Rican boyfriend and Tyson, their African American best friend. All are "anatomically correct" but with oversized penises. Carlos is uncircumcised, Billy and Tyson are circumcised. Within one month of the launch Totem International Inc., the US subsidiary owned by Totem International Ltd., sold Billy into over 400 stores in the US and Billy received media coverage in almost every newspaper in the US and many around the world.

=== In the media ===
In 1997, newspaper headlines included "Billy Doll Promoted to Voice Gay Rights," "Billy Doll Seen As Hero Of Gay Movement," "Billy The Doll Is Out Of The Closet And Anatomically Complete Too," "When A GI Joe Just Won't Do", "Billy Doll Shows Pride In Alternative Lifestyle", "Billy The Gay Doll Is A Hit In Miami" and "Every Doll Has His Day, Billy Bringing Levity To Gay Cause". Billy has been reported on in US publications as diverse as The New York Times, Out, The San Francisco Examiner, Newsweek, Elle, the Los Angeles Times, the New York Post, Genre, The Village Voice, the Washington Examiner, New York Daily News, The Advocate and Entertainment Weekly. Around the world Billy has been written about in The Independent, i-D, Design Week, L'Expresso, The Guardian, El País, The Observer, the London Evening Standard and Le Figaro. In 1997, Billy appeared on many TV and radio shows including the infamous Jay Leno joke, David Letterman, Comedy Central, Rosie O'Donnell and reports on CNN, ABC, Fox News Channel and all major news stations. Billy, Carlos and Tyson continue to attract media attention.

=== Range ===
The range of Billy Dolls include Billy, launched in 1997, Carlos, Billy's Puerto Rican boyfriend, launched in 1998 and Tyson, their African American best friend, launched in 1999. Styles of Billy, Carlos and Tyson dolls launched, included in 1997, Master Billy, Cowboy Billy, Wall Street Billy, Sailor Billy, San Francisco Billy and Tuxedo Billy. In 1998, Vacation Billy, Vacation Carlos, New York Carlos, Gay Games Billy, Billy Cop, Wrestler Billy, Wrestler Carlos, Santa Billy and Santa Carlos. In 1999, Baseball Billy, Baseball Carlos, Carlos Cop, Country Billy, Cha-Cha Carlos, Fireman Billy, Fireman Carlos, Army Tyson, Leather Tyson, Tattoo Billy, Tattoo Carlos and Santa Tyson. BPS Billy, BPS Carlos and BPS Tyson were launched in 2001. Billy was also produced with brunette hair and launched in 1997 and all clothing was available to buy separately in a line called "Billy Clothing".

== Significant events ==
=== Billy Coming-Out Parties ===
"Billy Coming-Out Parties" were staged all over the world following the launch of Billy in 1997. Monthly Billy "coming-out" parties were held at hip clubs in cities such as Miami, Chicago, Philadelphia, New York, Atlanta, Fire Island, San Francisco, Provincetown and Los Angeles. Thousands would attend the parties to see buff dancers dressed as Billy, the venues decorated with images and videos created by John McKitterick and Juan Andres.

=== Billy Opens His Closet for LIFEbeat – The New Museum Of Contemporary Art, New York ===
In 1998, Billy was the subject of an exhibition at the New Museum of Contemporary Art in New York City. "Billy Opens His Closet" was an exhibition and auction to benefit the charity LIFEbeat – The Music Industry Fights AIDS. The opening and auction were held on June 2, 1998. The event was directed and organized by John McKitterick, Juan Andres and LIFEbeat together with sponsors Tommy Hilfiger, Moet and Chandon, Christie's Auction House, The Advocate and Totem International. Totem International recruited over 75 international fashion designers and artists to create miniature outfits for the dolls in an effort to raise funds for LIFEbeat – The Music Industry Fights AIDS. Some notable designers who contributed included Alexander McQueen, Calvin Klein, Christian Lacroix, Keith Haring, Tommy Hilfiger, Jean Paul Gaultier, Christopher Makos, Perry Ellis, Richard Bernstein, Liz Claiborne, Paul Smith, Moschino, Todd Oldham, Nicole Miller, Diesel, Rifat Ozbek, Betsey Johnson, Kenzo, Phillip Treacy, Katharine Hamnett, Agnes B, Matsuda, Antoni and Alison and Gianni Versace. The live auction by Christies Auction House raised over $60,000 – this amount included pieces by Jean Paul Gaultier, Tommy Hilfiger and Gianni Versace selling for $4,500, $4,000 and $3,500 respectively. The silent auction and the total philanthropic effort surrounding the event reached an incredible $250,000. LIFEbeat reported to John McKitterick and Juan Andres that they expected to raise close to $425,000 from the event in that year.

=== Out and About With Billy – dance music compilation CD ===
In 1998, to raise further funds for the charity LIFEbeat – The Music Industry Fights AIDS, John McKitterick, Juan Andres, Totem International and LIFEbeat joined forces with Fortune Records and released a compilation music CD entitled Out and About With Billy with donated tracks from Boy George, Pet Shop Boys and Billie Ray Martin. The CD went on the bestseller lists of both Tower Records and Virgin Records.

=== Billy Pop on sale throughout the US ===
In 1998, Jones Soda released a soda called "Billy Pop" with labels designed by Tommy Hilfiger, Jean Paul Gaultier, Christopher Makos, Richard Bernstein, John McKitterick and Juan Andres. All proceeds from the venture to benefit the charity LIFEbeat – The Music Industry Fights AIDS.

=== Photographic print series by Christopher Makos ===
In 1998, photographer and artist Christopher Makos photographed Billy for a series of prints. Christopher Makos' photographic subjects in the past have included Andy Warhol, Mick Jagger and Elizabeth Taylor.

=== Billy and Carlos in drag ===
In 1999, to celebrate the 30th anniversary of the Stonewall Riots, an event which launched the gay liberation movement in the United States, Billy and Carlos donned drag. Billy dressed in a gingham checkered pantsuit and became "Dolly" and Carlos became "Carmen" in a polka dot outfit reminiscent of those worn by Carmen Miranda. The Country Billy and Cha-Cha Carlos dolls were launched to highlight diversity, visibility and to ignite debate. In the same year twelve unique drag Billy and Carlos dolls were auctioned in the store window of Paul Smith in New York to benefit the London-based HIV/AIDS charity Body Positive. The drag Billy and Carlos dolls included Liza Minnelli, Naomi Campbell, Bette Midler, Carmen Miranda, Madonna, Judy Garland, Cher, Dolly Parton, The Queen, Wonder Woman and Marie Antoinette. John McKitterick, Juan Andres and Totem International organised an event in London to benefit the charity Body Positive and the highlight of the event was the culmination of the drag doll auction. The media were very supportive and praised Billy and Carlos' philanthropic efforts. Over 30,000 UK pounds are raised at the auction benefited the HIV/AIDS charity Body Positive.

=== The movies The Big Tease, Jeffrey's Hollywood Screen Trick and Billy 2000 ===
In 1999, Billy appeared as himself in the hit Warner Bros film comedy The Big Tease and unexpectedly Billy became the star of the movie. Also in 1999, John McKitterick and Juan Andres were approached by award-winning film director Todd Downing with the idea for an animated movie starring Billy, Carlos and Tyson called Jeffrey's Hollywood Screen Trick. Production started on the movie in spring 2000 and the movie was released in 2001. Billy and Carlos served as the basis for the film Billy 2000: Billy Goes To Hollywood, which featured segments based on the Master Billy, Cowboy Billy, Sailor Billy, Wall Street Billy and San Francisco Billy figures.

=== Big Fun With Billy – photographic exhibition and book ===
In 1999, the photographer of the male nude Dianora Niccolini approached John McKitterick and Juan Andres with the concept of a photographic book featuring Billy. Rizzoli/Univers – RCS Media Group first published the book Big Fun With Billy in 2001. In 2001, Dianora Niccolini opened the photographic exhibition "Billy". The photographs presented Billy, Carlos and Tyson in various scenarios in and around New York and Long Island. The exhibition was held at Throckmorton Fine Art in New York City and opened June 21, 2001.

=== 16 Feet Billy – the sculpture ===
In 2003, at the Freerange Arts Exhibition at the Truman's Brewery in London, artist Alex Hancock presented 16 Feet Billy. The sculpture measuring 16 feet (4.9 meters) was an exact replica of Billy naked, produced in fibreglass and resin. Alex Hancock explained the concept behind "16 Feet Billy":

To me Billy is a three dimensional form that represents a period of history, being born from an Art Aids Benefit to become an iconic figure. However, at this point, I think Billy needs more exposure to cement his role as a prominent figure in history. It could be easy for people not to look beyond the comic nature of Billy, by magnifying Billy to 16 Feet in height and placing him in an art context I hope to allow a larger and broader audience to be challenged by the issues that Billy raises. Billy is not presented clothed, so he is shown in his simplest form. My ultimate ambition would be to produce a version in bronze or stone. The very solid nature of the materials could mean that the concept of Billy would be around for many years.

=== Billy in The Science Museum's permanent exhibition "Making the Modern World" ===
In 2001, Billy was featured in a permanent exhibition at The Science Museum, London entitled "Making the Modern World". The exhibition includes Billy as one of over 1,000 manufactured objects that have had their own life-changing impact on our existence. The Science Museum's choice to present Billy, both an artwork and a mass-produced product, that has affected how we view the modern world recognizes and highlights Billy's iconic status. The Science Museum also has a Carlos Doll in their permanent collection.

== Controversy ==
=== The launch of Billy ===
When Billy the sculpture was exhibited in 1994 and Billy – The World's First Out and Proud Gay Doll was launched in 1997, John McKitterick and Juan Andres received support from the mainstream press and sections of the gay press. More conservative sections of society criticised the sculpture and the doll, accusing Billy, John McKitterick and Juan Andres of promoting, sensationalising, trivialising homosexuality and the stereotyping of gay men.

=== Tyson – The World's First Out and Proud Best Friend ===
In 1999, Totem International received major publicity when they announced the launch of Tyson. Tyson, promoted as Billy and Carlos' best friend and the first black, gay doll. Media coverage went worldwide when boxer Mike Tyson and male model Tyson Beckford both claimed in a full-page story in The New York Daily News that they both were considering lawsuits against Totem International for using their name and image for Tyson the doll. The threats resulted in further major media attention. The story appears on CNN, NBC, Comedy Central, Howard Stern and all major press and radio, including a feature in Time magazine.

=== BPS Billy ===
In 2001, a Billy doll wearing a brown uniform with a patch reading "BPS" (for Billy's Parcel Service) was introduced. United Parcel Service sent Totem cease and desist letters advising that the uniform violated UPS's trademark. Totem International agreed to stop selling the brown-uniformed Billy style.

== Cultural impact and legacy ==
=== Billy after 2004 ===
In 2004, John McKitterick and Juan Andres believing that their artwork Billy had succeeded in its aims and objectives ceased all production of the line of Billy dolls and accessories. Billy – The World's First Out and Proud Gay Doll is now recognized as an important chapter in gay and doll history.

=== Books ===
Since 2000, both Billy and Carlos have been the subject of or have featured in several academic essays and book publications including:

- Tropics of Desire - Inventions from Queer Latino America. Jose Quiroga (2000). New York University Press. ISBN 0-8147-6952-7
- Alexander McQueen - Fashion Visionary. Judith Watt (2012). Goodman Books Ltd. ISBN 978-1-84796-031-3
- Billy's World, or Toying with Desire in the Gay 1990s. Brian Eugenio Herrera (2014). MIT Press. New York University. ISSN 1054-2043 E-ISSN 1531-4715
- Latin Numbers - Playing Latino in the Twentieth Century U.S. Popular Performance. Brian Eugenio Herrera (2015). University of Michigan Press. ISBN 978-0-472-07264-4
- Alexander McQueen - Blood Beneath the Skin. Andrew Watson (2015). Simon and Schuster. ISBN 978-1-47113-178-3

Billy's image has been used in cover artwork for several academic book publications including:

- Gay Macho. Martin Levine (1998). New York University Press. ISBN 0-8147-4694-2
- The Trouble with Normal - Sex, Politics, and the Ethics of Queer Life. Michael Warner (1999). The Free Press / Simon and Schuster Inc. ISBN 0-684-86529-7

=== Museums, art galleries and institutions ===
Since 1994, Billy has been exhibited in and has collaborated with museums, art galleries and institutions, including the Freedom Gallery, London, Throckmorton Gallery, New York, The Science Museum, London, The Andy Warhol Museum, Pittsburg, The Keith Haring Foundation, New York, The New Museum of Contemporary Art, New York and Central Saint Martins - University of the Arts, London.

Recent acquisitions and exhibitions include:

- OMCA (Oakland Museum of Contemporary Art) acquired Billy - The World's First Out and Proud Gay Doll, in 2018. The artwork depicting three distinct groups of Billy Dolls is housed in the OMCAs All of Us or None Collection.
- The Gay Doll Museum, London, exhibited several Billy, Carlos and Tyson dolls at The Art Workers Guild in London in 2019. Documenting a history, the museum houses over 200 exhibits and is an ongoing art project curated by the artist Nigel Grimmer.
- New York Historical Society Museum and Library acquired Master Billy for its collection in 2020 and stated "What Billy represented was a turning point in LGBTQ culture, when it was slowly moving out of silence and shadows and into the popular mainstream. As McKitterick said back in 1997, ‘I was always sure Billy would be 100 percent successful…He is the first gay product that can be sold over-the-counter instead of under it.´ It is for this reason that New York Historical is thrilled to welcome Billy into our collection".
- The Secret Museum, Montreal

== See also ==
- Earring Magic Ken
- Gay Bob
