= Sudbury railway station (disambiguation) =

Sudbury railway station may refer to:

- Sudbury railway station in Suffolk, England
- Sudbury & Harrow Road railway station in London, England
- Sudbury Hill tube station in London, England
- Sudbury Hill Harrow railway station in London, England
- Sudbury railway station (Staffordshire) in England (closed 1966)
- Sudbury station (Ontario) in Greater Sudbury, Ontario, Canada
- Sudbury Junction station in Greater Sudbury, Ontario, Canada
- Sudbury Town tube station in London, England
- Wembley Central station, previously named Sudbury; Sudbury and Wembley and Wembley for Sudbury
