= Bili, Azerbaijan =

Bili
- Village
- Location within Azerbaijan
- Coordinates: 38°36′N 48°45′E
- Country: Azerbaijan
- Rayon: Astara
- Municipality: Marzəsə
- Time zone: UTC+4 (AZT)
  - Summer (DST): UTC+5 (AZT)

Bili is a village in the municipality of Marzəsə in the Astara Rayon of Azerbaijan.
