= Billy (surname) =

Billy is a surname. Notable people with the surname include:

- André Billy (1882–1971), French writer
- André Billy (1876–1913), French footballer
- Billy Billy, pseudonym of Yao Billy Serge (1980–), Ivorian rapper
- Bertrand de Billy (1965–), French conductor
- Édouard de Billy (1802–1874), French engineer
- Simon Billy (born 1991), French speed skier

== See also ==
- Billy (name)
