= Bili ape =

Group of apes reported as cryptids

- Report: 2003
- Type: Ape
- Country: Democratic Republic of the Congo

The Bili apes, or Bondo mystery apes, were names given to great apes said to inhabit the Bili Forest around the village of Bili in the Democratic Republic of the Congo.

Some of the reports and early investigations were criticized as sensationalistic and unscientific, making controversial claims such as the Bili apes being extremely large, walking upright for extended periods, killing lions, or being chimpanzee-gorilla hybrids. However, scientists determined the creatures in question were common chimpanzees, and part of a larger contiguous population stretching throughout that part of northern Congo.

Genetic testing with non-nuclear DNA determined the Bili Forest chimpanzees were part of the eastern chimpanzee (Pan troglodytes schweinfurthii), a subspecies of the common chimpanzee. Some of their behavior was atypical, with a 2003 National Geographic article stating: "The apes nest on the ground like gorillas, but they have a diet and features characteristic of chimpanzees".

== History ==
Skulls of gorillas were first collected near the town of Bili in 1908. These were sent to the colonial power of Belgium; in 1927, a new subspecies of gorilla, Gorilla gorilla uellensis, was described based upon these specimens. Colin Groves examined the skulls in 1970 and determined that they were indistinguishable from western gorillas.

Karl Ammann, a Swiss Kenyan photographer and anti-bushmeat campaigner, first visited the city in 1996, looking for the gorillas. Instead, Ammann bought a skull that had dimensions like that of a chimpanzee, but with a prominent sagittal crest like that of a gorilla. Ammann purchased a photograph from hunters of what looked like a very big chimpanzee. Ammann also measured a faecal dropping three times as big as normal chimpanzee dung and casts of footprints as large as or larger than a gorilla's.

Ammann, with a group of foreign researchers, returned in 2000 to an area described by a Cameroonian bushmeat hunter he had sent to scout the area first a few years earlier. Although they did not see any chimpanzees, they did find several well-worn ground nests, characteristic of gorillas rather than chimpanzees, in swampy river beds.

In 2001, an international team of scientists, including George Schaller and Mike Belliveau, were recruited by Karl Ammann to search for apes, but the venture came up empty.

After the Second Congo War ended in 2003, it was easier for scientists to conduct field research in the Congo. Also recruited by Ammann was Shelly Williams, an experimental psychologist affiliated with National Geographic magazine, who claimed to be the first scientist to see the 'Bili apes'. Williams returned to the US with videos, apparently purchased from one of Ammann's long-term trackers. Williams reported on her close encounter, "we could hear them in the trees, about 10 m [33 ft] away, and four suddenly came rushing through the brush towards me. If this had been a mock charge they would have been screaming to intimidate us. These guys were quiet, and they were huge. They were coming in for the kill – but as soon as they saw my face they stopped and disappeared".

According to Williams, who claims she learnt the Lingala language spoken in the region, the local Boa people classified great apes into two distinct groups. There are the "tree beaters", which disperse high into the trees to stay safe, and easily succumb to the poison arrows used by local hunters. Then there are the "lion killers", which seldom climb trees, are bigger and darker, and are unaffected by the poison arrows. Other reports attribute this statement to Ammann. Williams claimed to have observed three species of chimpanzees, including this new one, during her summer tour.

"The unique characteristics they exhibit just don't fit into the other groups of apes", said Williams. The apes, she argued, could be a new species unknown to science, a new subspecies of chimpanzee, or a hybrid of the gorilla and the chimpanzee. "At the very least, we have a unique, isolated chimp culture that's unlike any that's been studied", she said. These and other sensational pronouncements to the media proved controversial, and Williams was subsequently no longer welcome to study the animals with Ammann. Ammann had published a letter in 2003 decrying Williams' unprofessional involvement. Williams vowed to continue without him, making plans for another expedition. Cleve Hicks, a primatologist recruited by Ammann in 2004, stated "genetically, they're not even a subspecies".

Mitochondrial DNA resolved from hairs taken from the nests found in 2003 that the chimpanzees belonged to Pan troglodytes schweinfurthii. Williams countered that all these hairs may have been contaminated by real chimpanzees or humans, or that the conventional use of mDNA regions discovered in human research as genetic markers was incorrect in primatology, or that the mDNA, which is only transmitted by mothers, would not reflect one-way hybridisation with male gorillas.

In 2004, Hicks studied several communities of the chimpanzees approximately 60 km (37 mi) northwest of the town of Bili. Although the apes, including adult males, would surround the humans and display an interest or curiosity in them, somewhat like previous reports, they did not attack or become threatening.

In 2005, Williams was paralysed in an accident, and her claims to the media ceased. She never mounted her planned expedition.

By 2006, Hicks and colleagues had completed another long hunt for the chimpanzees during which they were able to observe the creatures a total of twenty hours. Hicks reported, "I see nothing gorilla about them. The females definitely have a chimp's sex swellings, they pant-hoot and tree-drum, and so on". DNA samples recovered from faeces also reaffirmed the classification of these apes in the chimpanzee subspecies P. t. schweinfurthii. When a report on Hicks' research on the New Scientist website was later confused with claims originating from Williams, Hicks wrote to claim the article misreported and misquoted him.

In 2019, Hicks and others published a comprehensive paper on the chimpanzees of the wider 'Bili-Uéré region', as they termed the central part of the Uélé watershed. The old giant ape controversy was ignored entirely. Twenty chimpanzee groups were studied over twelve years. In the work, Hicks et al. classifies the chimpanzees of this area as a behavioural "realm", subdivided into many "regions", united by common preferences and techniques, defined by tool use, dietary preferences and such habits. Chimpanzees of Bili-Uéré, for example, do not eat termites of the Macrotermes genus, which are otherwise much loved by the apes, unless the termites are having a mating swarm. Despite early reports of super-long rods used to fish termites, Hicks et al. document that these chimpanzees do not use rods to fish for termites at all, but instead bash the mounds open against roots.

== Description ==
Williams initially claimed the apes were bipedal (meaning they walk upright) and stood 6 ft (1.8 m) tall, with the appearance of a giant chimpanzee.

According to Williams, "They have a very flat face, a wide muzzle and their brow-ridge runs straight across and overhangs. They seem to turn grey very early in life, but instead of turning grey-black like a gorilla, they turn grey all over." They develop uniform grey fur independently of age and sex, which suggests that greying takes place early in life (whereas in all known gorilla species, only males gray as they age and graying is restricted to their backs).

A single skull from Bili has the prominent brow ridge and a sagittal crest similar to that of a gorilla, but other morphological measurements are like those of chimpanzees. Only one of the many skulls found at Bili had a sagittal crest, thus it cannot be considered typical for the population.

Female Bili apes have genital swellings similar to other chimpanzees, although Williams claimed otherwise.

=== Behavior ===
According to Williams, the apes howled at the Moon. Hicks and Ammann disputed that.

According to Hicks, in some ways, the apes behave more like gorillas than chimpanzees. For example, they build ground nests as gorillas do, using interwoven branches and/or saplings, bent down into a central bowl. However, they frequently nest in the trees as well. Often ground nests will be found beneath or in proximity to tree nests. Their diet is decidedly chimpanzee-like, consisting mainly of fruits (fruiting trees such as strangler figs are visited often).

Hicks observed one group far from the roads and villages in 2004, saying that when they encountered it, the chimps not only approached the humans, but also would actually surround them with intent curiosity. Hicks found the behavior toward humans intriguing. They would come face-to-face, stare intently, then slide away quietly. There was little to no aggression, yet no fear, either. "Gorilla males will always charge when they encounter a hunter, but there were no stories like that" about the chimpanzees, according to Ammann. Hicks clarifies Williams' claims as follows: the apes within roughly 20 km (12 mi) of the roads flee humans almost without exception. The adult males show the greatest fear. Further from the roads, however, the chimpanzees become progressively "naive".

Even though these apes avoid the camera, they seem to have a curious nature. It has been observed that, when these chimps find humans around, they don’t just approach humans, but circle them out of pure curiosity. The chimpanzees would stand face to face and exchange longing glances.

== Distribution ==
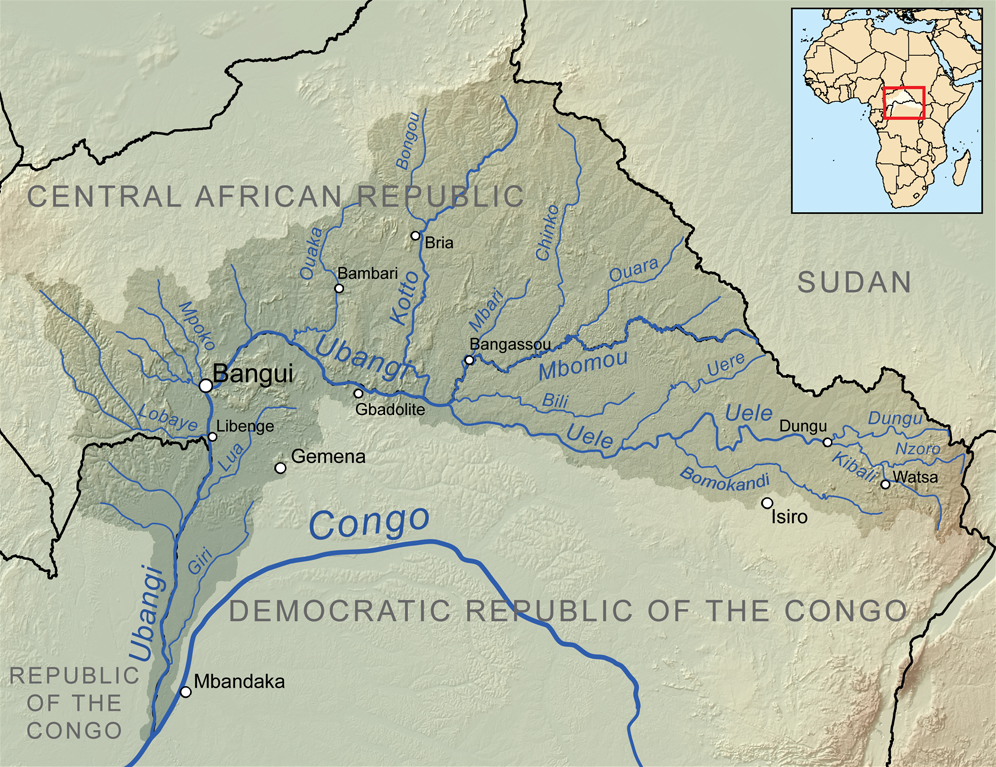
map of the Ubangi river

Bili is a city, and a river tributary, which lies in the Democratic Republic of the Congo's far north, about 200 kilometres (120 mi) east of the Ebola River. It lies to the north of the Uélé River, to the south of this river lie deep tropical rainforests, whereas around Bili lie wetlands and the forests are broken by patches of savanna. Civil war and neglect had left the region relatively undeveloped and wild, with people still using home-made guns of ancient design in 2005.

Chimpanzees were also tracked by Ammann in the region near the city of Bondo, 200 kilometres (120 mi) to the west, in 2004.

In 2006, Hicks moved the study to the much denser forests around Gangu, and 50 to 55 kilometres (31 to 34 mi) from the road to Bili. By 2007 they had grown frightened of the new arrivals to the city of Bili as gold was found in the region, and moved south of the Uélé. In 2007, Hicks was based in the city of Aketi, a few hundred kilometres southwest of Bondo.

As of 2014, a large contiguous population of chimpanzees is now known to occur in the lands along both sides of the Uélé throughout Bas-Uélé District, in a range of habitats. They can be found throughout the region, in the savannahs around Bili and the dense rainforests a few hundred kilometres south. They are adapted to humans and occur within four kilometres (2.5 mi) of Bili, as well as other neighbouring towns such as Lebo and Zapay, and within thirteen kilometres (8.1 mi) of large cities such as Buta.

== Conservation ==
Primates throughout the Congo are hunted for bushmeat, although less to the north of the Uélé. Beginning in 2007 the Bili area saw an influx of gold miners, prompting concern by Westerners about the animals in the area. Over a 14-month period between September 2007 and November 2008, Hicks and his associates documented 34 chimpanzee young and 31 carcasses for sale in the cities of Buta, Aketi and Bambesa.

== See also ==
- Mangani (fictional great apes of the Tarzan series)
- Sympatric speciation
