= Pant-hoot =

Type of chimpanzee vocalization

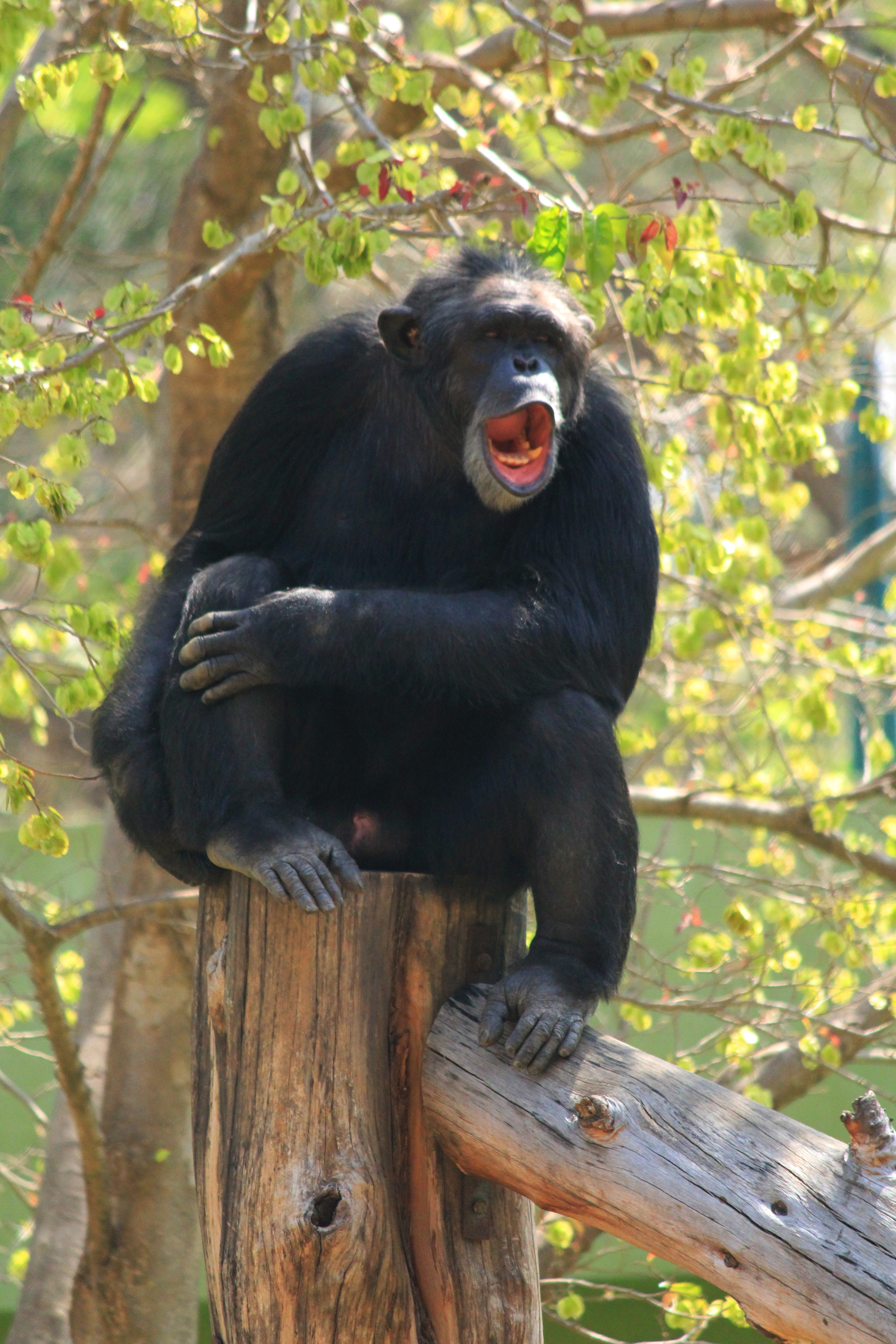
Chimpanzee vocalizing

Pant-hoot made by an adult male chimpanzee, effectively demonstrating the introduction, build-up, climax and let-down phases.

The pant-hoot is a loud, structurally complex vocalization of chimpanzees. The call is generally divided into four distinct, successive phases: introduction, build-up, climax and let-down. This introductory phase begins with soft, breathy, low-frequency 'hoo's' that transition into the build-up phase; a series of increasingly rapid, low-frequency in-and-out pants. Following the build-up phase, the call quickly builds into the climax, consisting of loud, high-frequency screams that eventually slow into the let-down phase, similar in structure to the build-up, but with decreasing amplitude and pace until the call is complete.

Both male and female chimpanzees produce these unique vocalizations, with high-ranking adult males predominantly and more frequently emitting the pant-hoot. The pant-hoot is most often produced jointly with other males, in a complementary behaviour known as chorusing, as opposed to producing the calls individually.

These loud, long-distance vocalizations are produced for numerous purposes in a variety of different circumstances and situations. Pant-hoot chorusing can be used to aid in the formation of social groups or parties amongst male chimpanzees, and used to display the dominance and strength of their party to conspecifics. Pant-hoots are also produced upon the arrival of fruit trees to indicate the location of abundant resources and when joining and greeting other members of their social group. Calls are produced to indicate the spatial location of the individuals in a party, facilitating the maintenance and unity of the social group by providing a means of communication between members while travelling, often listening to the distant calls made by other chimpanzees and responding to them. Also, pant-hoots are used to identify and distinguish between members of a social group, as each individual upholds some variation in their specific calls. Additionally, the level of pant-hooting in chimps vary based upon their individual dominance rank within a party. There are also levels of variation observed within the structure and expression of pant-hoot calls within this range of circumstances, which serve to separate populations, social parties and individuals from one another, allowing coherence between the members in all situations, as well as the establishment of individual identities among each chimp.

Grunting is made in situations like feeding and greeting. Submissive individuals make "pant-grunts" towards their superiors.

== Social bonding (affiliation) ==
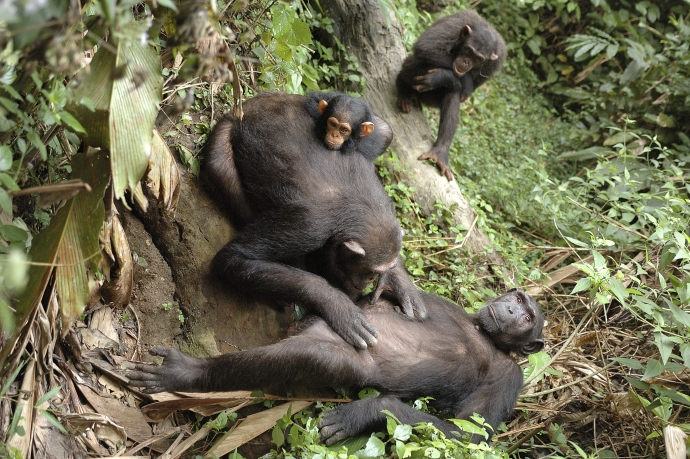
Chimpanzee grooming, a reciprocal behaviour commonly associated with the formation of social bonds between individuals.

Pant-hoot chorusing in chimpanzees is a facilitative method of social bonding between males in a population and can be indicative of the level of affiliation between members in a party. A social affiliation between male chimpanzees can be recognized by observable behaviours such as reciprocal grooming, non-vocal displays and the support of a member during conflicts with conspecifics. The display of these behaviours between two male chimpanzees or an entire group suggest that these individuals are highly affiliated with strong social bonds. The production of pant-hoots between members is also reflective upon this observation, in which individuals are more likely to engage in chorusing behaviours with their long-term affiliative social partners, as opposed to other neutral males in which they are not affiliated. However, male chimpanzees have been found to occasionally chorus with neutral males in situations where their preferred social partner is unavailable, forming short-term social bonds, and essentially displaying the three behaviours indicative of social bonding; grooming, support and non-vocal displays during days when they pant-hoot chorus with these neutral males. This illustrates how joint pant-hoot chorusing can facilitate the formation of social bonding activities between male chimpanzees. The establishment of this bond can be indicated to each member of the party as the joint chorus and response to the initial caller illustrates the commitment and attention that the correspondent has devoted to the caller, and subsequently, the formation of the social bond between them.

The formation of social groups among male chimpanzees can be beneficial in both short-term and long-term scenarios. The formation of short-term social bonds between males in absence of their preferred social partner can serve as an alternate mechanism for coalition, providing temporary support and protection while separated from their long-term partners. In the formation of long-term bonds, members of a chimpanzee party will display their pant-hoot chorusing behaviour as an indication of their socially affiliative strength to third-party males, suggesting their support of one another, combined dominance and the overall strength of their territorial defence.

== Spatial communication ==
Following the formation of social bonds and parties within chimpanzee populations, these social affiliations are thought to be maintained by the production of pant-hoot calls upon the spatial separation of the group, serving as a means of communication and contact between members. Each specific member in a party can be identified by their pant-hoot by other members of their social group and by other populations based on variation in the structure and dialectal differences of their call. Therefore, pant-hoots can be produced to indicate locational changes of specific members, with calls being produced before and after travelling, to announce their new relative spatial position to other members of their affiliative party. When members remain in close spatial proximity to one another, this pant-hooting is reduced, as opposed to situations in which members are temporarily spatially separated and constantly travelling. In travelling situations, pant-hoots are used to assist in the maintenance of the group's connection, and awareness of the whereabouts of each of their affiliative partners. In addition, when individuals are in complete absence and isolation of their social partners, pant-hoot production is significantly reduced, and upon reuniting within certain spatial boundaries, pant-hooting and communication between the partners resume.

Spatial contact between members of a chimpanzee party may be maintained to uphold the fitness benefits brought upon by the social affiliation with other chimpanzees. Social bonds can be identified by the reciprocal grooming and support during intraspecific conflicts, and these affiliative behaviours can be announced in the face of third-party males by the production of pant-hoot choruses which demonstrate their dominance and strength as a group. Dominance rank among male chimpanzees is tied hand-in-hand with mating and reproductive success, therefore, the maintenance of the social group and the affiliation with other individuals brings an adaptive benefit in the establishment of higher dominance rankings, therefore increasing their reproductive success, and essentially overall fitness. This in turn illustrates the adaptive benefit of spatial communication and contact with allies that sustain the highest potential for contributing fitness benefits to the overall group.

== Variation/modification ==
The modifications and variability observed within the chimpanzee pant-hoots can be attributed to differences in the structure and the production of these vocalizations. Structural differences in the pant hoot have been observed with respect to behavioural context, such as in the production of chorusing, habitat composition and genetic differentiation with respect to geographic separation and differences based upon experience and vocal learning. Additionally, the overall production and level of pant-hoot expression vary based on the dominance rank of individuals and the risks imposed by location and human interactions.

=== Structure ===
The general structure of chimpanzee pant-hoots (introduction, build-up, climax and let-down) can be variable between populations, including instances of additions/removals of certain phrases, changes in the duration of each phrase and the rearrangement of the general sequential pattern of phrases, with these modifications being easily identified by researchers, experts and other human listeners. These structural differences may be attributed to behavioural contexts, genetic differences between members of different populations due to geographic separation, and consequently, varying habitat conditions and learning based upon experience (vocal learning).

Chimpanzees have been observed to modify the structure of their pant-hoot based upon the behavioural situations in which they are in. For example, during pant-hoot chorusing behaviour, males will modify the structure of their calls to essentially become more similar to the calls of their affiliative partners, as opposed to the very specific call they produce when pant-hooting individually. Males will also modify the structure of their calls to facilitate this chorusing behaviour and social bonding phenomenon. It has been observed that male chimps will prolong the production of the build-up phase to increase the likelihood of another individual joining in and ultimately forming a chorus. Additionally, once the chorus has been formed, the climax phase of the chorus is extended in length to increase the effectiveness of the display and the strength of the bond between the chorusing partners. The modifications to the duration of the build-up and climax phrases of the pant-hoot structure illustrate a mechanism for increasing the probability and efficient formation and maintenance of social parties and chorusing groups of chimpanzees.

Modifications of the structural composition of the pant-hoot between populations may also be explained by genetic differentiation and habitat composition of populations based upon geographical separation. The greater distance there is between populations, there is a reduced possibility of migration and consequently gene flow between populations. Migration in turn causes the genetic makeup of populations to homogenize and converge, increasing similarity between the two groups. With increased geographic separation, and therefore increased distance and reduced gene flow, populations will become genetically divergent from one another and increasingly differentiated, supporting the observation of differences in the duration, and structure of pant-hoot phrases amongst these geographically separated populations. In addition to genetic differentiation between geographically isolated populations, habitat conditions increasingly differ with increasing geographic separation. In turn, structural differences in the pant-hoot are observed based upon habitat differentiation within populations. Pant-hoots are used as a form of long-distance communication between members of chimp parties, therefore, sound attenuation is an important consideration in the production of these calls. Individuals living in forest ecosystems must modify the structure of their pant-hoot to reduce the effects of degradation and attenuation on the transmission of their call due to the high number trees obstructing the pathway of the travelling sound. These obstructions increase the possibility of refraction and scattering of the sound waves, therefore increasing the rate of attenuation and decreasing the effectiveness of the calls. To counteract these effects, individuals living within a forest habitat will produce slower, low frequency calls, which slow the rate of attenuation and reduce the risk of degradation of the pant-hoot, in comparison to individuals living in open areas and fields, where the need for this structural modification is reduced.

Finally, the variable structure of chimpanzee pant-hoots amongst populations may be attributable to experience, based on the theory of vocal learning. Chimpanzees possess specific individual characteristics of their pant-hoots as a mechanism for recognition by other members of their social groups. However, when engaging in chorusing behaviours with other males, each participant displays call convergence, in which the calls of each individual resemble the other, in the formation of a group-specific call. The learning of these group-specific calls provides a method for rapid identification of members within the same affiliative group, allowing for an increased benefit when engaging in intraspecies conflicts, allowing members to distinguish their allies from their opponents. The production of group-specific calls demonstrate the variability in the structure of chimpanzee pant-hoots as these behaviours and specific calls are a learned mechanism to distinguish neighbouring populations from one another, as each population maintains modifications to their pant-hoots in relation to the next, illustrating the structural diversity of the pant-hoot with respect to vocal learning.

=== Production ===
Chimpanzees tend to alter the production and duration of pant-hoots based upon their dominance rank with respect to other individuals and the locational risk and human influences associated with the production of these loud, long-distance vocalizations.

High-ranking, dominant males produce longer and more frequent pant-hoots than individuals of a lower social status. This may be attributed to sexual selection for high levels of call production, as this indicates the high quality and dominance of the calling individual to conspecifics and prospective mates. The production of pant-hoots are related to the formation of social status as calling facilitates the formation of strong social bonds and affiliations between members, equivalently increasing the displayed coalition, strength and essentially dominance of each individual in the socially affiliated group. Increasing the display of strength and dominance increases the attraction of mates, and ultimately fitness, resulting in the selection of these dominant males with increased production of pant-hoots rather than lower-ranking males.

Chimps will also alter the production of calls based on the situational circumstances of their location. In areas where chimps are at a high risk of attack by rival individuals, such as crossing the territorial boundaries of conspecifics where acts of aggression and life-threatening battles are common, there is a fluidity in the production of loud vocalizations and pant-hooting within these individuals to reduce the potential for conflict. Chimps are observed to either reduce the production of these loud, long-distance pant-hoots when approaching the periphery in an attempt to avoid detection and attacks by hostile conspecifics, or they will display increased levels of pant-hooting in an attempt to display dominance and the strength of the territorial defence of their party, to induce the retreat of rival individuals. Subsequently, some chimpanzees inhabiting areas subject to high hunting pressures by humans will modify the production of pant-hoots in an attempt to remain undetected. In areas where humans are prevalent and the risks associated with hunting are high, chimps will reduce the production of loud, pant-hoots to make it difficult to be located by hunters. However, some individuals will still produce territorial hooting in the face of rival populations, regardless of the threats imposed by humans. Individuals also modify call production temporally, by increasing pant-hooting behaviours in the early morning and late night hours when human activity slows and the risk of being hunted is reduced. When located in areas where human impacts are reduced and hunting is less prevalent, chimpanzees will produce loud vocalizations and pant-hoots at a level which is considered to be normally expected.

== See also ==
- Dominance signal
