= Bakalai =

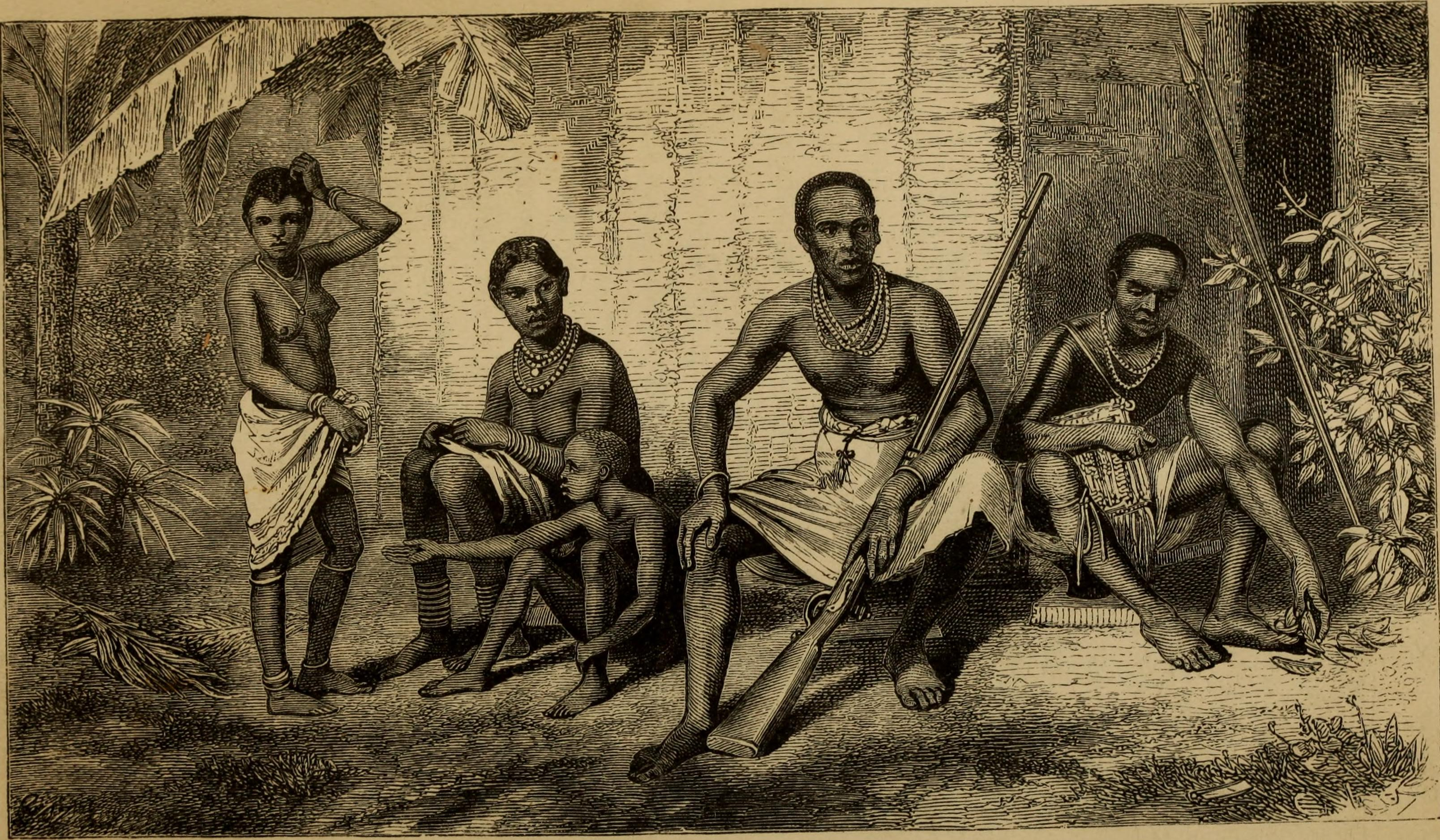
Bakalai people in an 1874 illustration

The Bakalai (Bakale, Bangouens) are a Bantu tribe inhabiting a wide tract of land, formerly part of French Congo, between the Ogowe river and 2° south.

The Bakalai appear to be immigrants from the south-east, and have been supposed to be connected with the Galoa, one of the Mpongwe tribes and the chief river-people of the Ogowe. The Bakalai have suffered much from the incursions of their neighbors the Fang, also arrivals from the south-east, and it may be that they migrated to their present abode under pressure from this people at an earlier date. They are keen hunters and were traders in slaves and rubber; the slave traffic has been prohibited by the French authorities.

Their women display considerable ingenuity in dressing their hair, often taking a whole day to arrange a coiffure; the hair is carefully arranged on a substructure of clay and a good deal of false hair incorporated; a coat of red, green or yellow pigment often completes the effect. The same colors are used to decorate the hut doors. The villages, some of which are fortified with palisades, are usually very dirty; chiefs and rich men own plantations which are situated at some distance from the village and to which their womenfolk are sent in times of war.

The Bakalai of Lake Isanga cremate their dead; those of the Upper Ogowe throw the bodies into the river, with the exception of those killed in war. The body of a chief is placed secretly in a hut erected in the depths of the forest, and the village is deserted for that night, in some cases altogether; the slaves of the deceased are (or were) sacrificed, and his wives scourged and secluded in huts for a week. "Natural" deaths are attributed to the machinations of a sorcerer, and the poison-ordeal is often practised. Of their social organization little is known, but it appears that nearly all individuals refrain from eating the flesh of some particular animal.
