= Eileen Gibb =

British children's writer (1911–2003)

- Born: Eileen Mabel Gibb; 3 August 1911; Croydon, Surrey, UK
- Died: 25 December 2003 (aged 92); Winchester, Hampshire, UK
- Occupation: Author
- Years active: 1949–1965
- Known for: Sammy the Shunter book series

Eileen Mabel Gibb (3 August 1911 – 25 December 2003) was a British author best known for the Adventures of Sammy the Shunter series of books for children.

== Early life ==
Gibb was born on 3 August 1911 in Croydon, Surrey. She married John Terrance "Terry" Holder in 1942. Holder was a major in the Royal Engineers during World War II and the manager of the Romney, Hythe and Dymchurch Railway from 1944 to 1948. Holder's father, John Alexander Holder, was a founding director of the Romney, Hythe and Dymchurch Railway and kept a miniature railway at his home Broome House in Broome, Worcestershire, which he later moved to Keeping House in Beaulieu, Hampshire.

== Career ==
From 1949 to 1964, Gibb wrote a picture book series about the Adventures Sammy the Shunter, an anthropomorphic steam locomotive. Her husband became the sales manager of Ian Allan Publishing in 1948, which specialised in nonfiction transportation books and agreed to publish Gibb's books. Gibb also worked with Ian Allan Publishing to produce a series about a bus, starting with Billy and the Robbers in 1953. She contributed to Robin children's magazine with tales of Tubby the Odd-Job Engine. When Sammy the Shunter Bumper Book (1954) was reprinted in 1976, Ian Allan Publishing noted that the series books had been reprinted some 20 to 30 times and estimated that at least two million copies had been sold.

== Sammy the Shunter books ==
=== Description ===
Sammy the Shunter is a 2-4-2T steam locomotive, painted red with green wheels and a yellow dome who lives in the fictional town of Sleeping Sunbury in England. The various books tell of Sammy's adventures all over the world.

=== Characters ===
- Sammy is the main character throughout the books. He is a friendly 2-4-2T steam shunter painted red with green wheels, yellow buffers, blue running plates and yellow lining with his nameplate on his sides in yellow. In the first book, Sammy used to be a rusty colour and had a number 109846 before being repainted.
- Mr. Buffin is Sammy's driver. He is a kind old man who is seen with Sammy on his adventures. It is mentioned in "Sammy Gets Streamlined" that he was meant to drive the Flying Scotsman but things had gone wrong. Mr. Buffin has a fear of wild animals.
- Mr. Plum is the stationmaster of Sleeping Sunbury station. Mr. Plum is a strict man with a short temper who addressed Sammy by his number in the earlier books, but has a kinder side.

== Personal life ==
Holder and Gibb had two children. In the 1950s, the family lived in Cobham, Surrey. When Holder was the managing director of the Dart Valley Railway, Gibb assisted him by unveiling the restored coach Vicky that had been used by Queen Victoria.

Gibb died in December 2003 in Winchester, Hampshire, England.

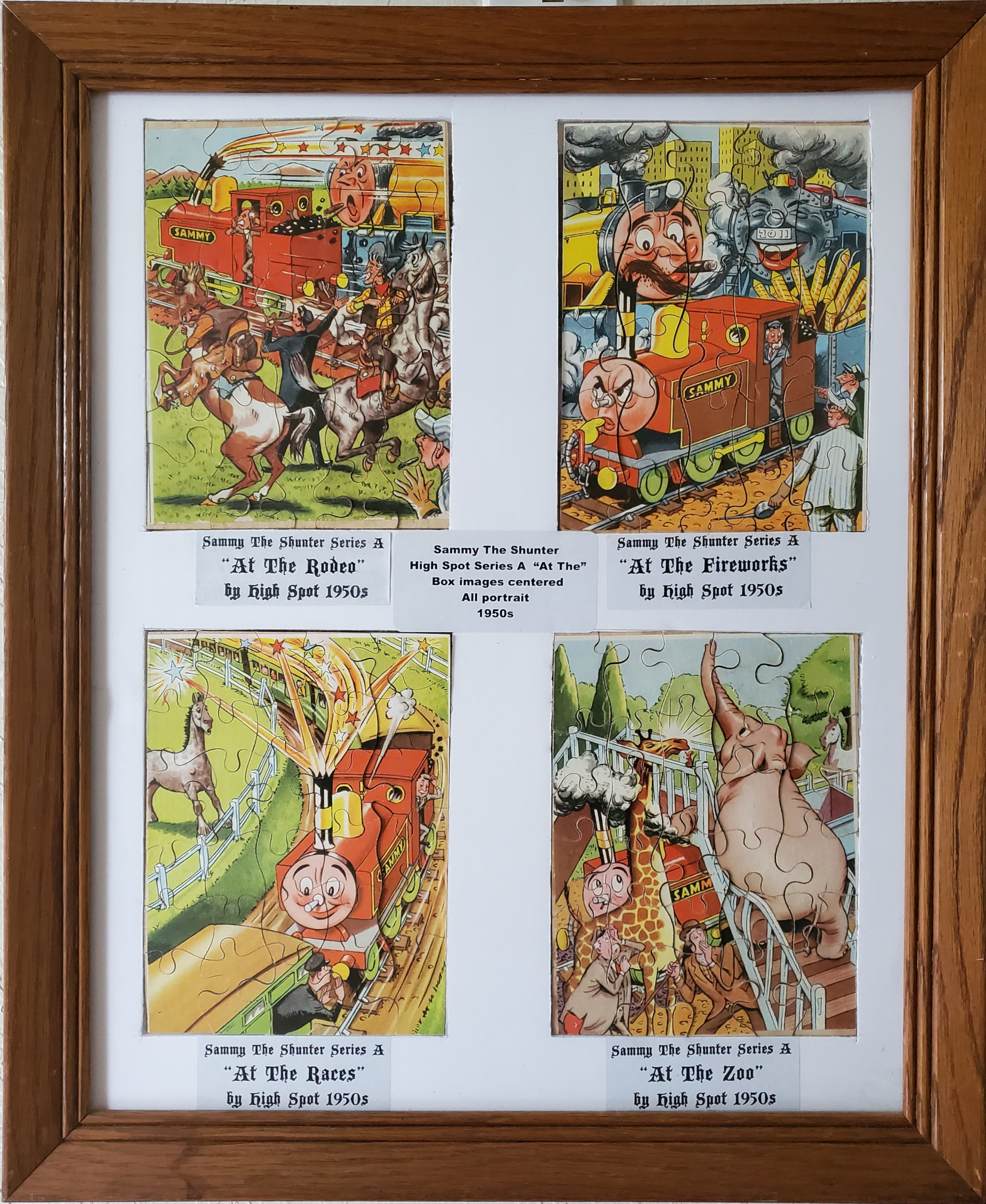
Series A: The first High Top series of 4 Sammy the Shunter jigsaws.

== Sammy in popular culture ==
Wiltoys High Spot released two series, each of four, jigsaw puzzles featuring Sammy the Shunter in the 1950s.

In the 1950s and 1960s, Harold Elliot demonstrated an O gauge model of Sammy the Shunter at Elliot Model Railway Exhibitions' Railwayland in Scarborough and Brighton.

Sammy's story was told on the BBC's Children's TV Hour in March 1954.

== Selected publications ==
- Sammy Gets Streamlined. London: Ian Allan. December 1949. OCLC 663900963.
- Sammy Goes to the Circus. London: Ian Allan. September 1950. OCLC 30180291.
- Sammy Goes to Sea. London: Ian Allan. 1951. OCLC 810754930.
- Sammy Goes to America. London: Ian Allan. November 1951.
- Sammy Goes to Fairyland. London: Ian Allan. August 1952.
- Sammy Meets Father Christmas. London: Ian Allan. November 1952. OCLC 30191217.
- Billy and the Robbers. Hampton Court: Ian Allan. February 1953. (Note: Bill the Bus series)
- Billy Goes Exploring. Hampton Court: Ian Allan. May 1953.
- Sammy Goes to School. London: Ian Allan. July 1953. OCLC 30169720. (Note: Sammy Rhymes series)
- Sammy Sees the Doctor. London: Ian Allan. February 1954. OCLC 810754935.
- Sammy and the Old Engines. London: Ian Allan. June 1954. OCLC 30168960.
- Sammy the Shunter Bumper Book. London: Ian Allan. October 1954. OCLC 560539851.
- Sammy Joins the Scouts. London: Ian Allan. June 1955. OCLC 663899396.
- Sammy Goes to the Pole. London: Ian Allan. 1957. OCLC 663899440.
- Tubby the Odd-Job Engine. London: Hulton Press. 1959. OCLC 753005221.
- Sammy Saves a Railway Line. London: Ian Allan. 1965. OCLC 30269535.
