= Billi (cat) =

Feline research subject

- Born: August 2, 2008
- Died: June 20, 2024 (aged 15)
- Known for: Intelligent use of AAC technology, TikTok videos
- Relatives: Kendra Baker (owner); Dad (co-owner)

Billi (August 2, 2008 - June 20, 2024) was a female domestic shorthair cat who displayed behaviors that may have been human-animal communication. Billi reportedly learned over 70 words. She used a set of soundboard buttons, made by Learning Resources and FluentPet, to "talk".

Billi was the subject of scientific study TheyCanTalk by researchers at the University of California, San Diego, and was monitored by cameras placed in the living room of her owner Kendra Baker.

== Biography ==
Billi was born on August 2, 2008. In 2009, Kendra Baker found her after she ran across a road and caused a minor car accident. Baker, a veterinarian, took Billi in when her owner couldn't be found.

In May 2020, during the COVID-19 lockdowns, Baker taught Billi to use buttons to "speak". Billi was already 11 years old by then. Baker used programmable buttons that Billi could press in succession to form "sentences", and use words such as "mad", "ouch", and "later". After a while Baker and Billi joined the TheyCanTalk observational research study.

In videos posted to YouTube and TikTok, Billi can be seen pressing the buttons "catnip" "water" when Kendra was drinking her morning coffee. Her favorite word was "mad".

Billi had feline hyperesthesia syndrome and chronic kidney disease. In the final months of her life, her use of the talking buttons decreased due to her terminal illness.

== Use of language ==
Billi used augmentative and alternative communication. She pressed buttons on a mat, each programmed with a recording of a specific word, such as "Billi", "food", "mad", "now", "afternoon", "catnip", "fan toy", "zoom zoom" and "bye". Whenever these buttons were pressed, they played the words they were programmed to, similar to the Fitzgerald Key, a method used to teach deaf children sentence structure. Billi could reportedly string a few words together in broken sentences. Billi however appeared to string words together less frequently than dogs in the same training program.

== See also ==
- Animal language
- Talking animal
- Evolution of language
- Yerkish
- Kanzi
- Alex (parrot)
- Bunny (dog)
- Elsie (cat)
- Clever Hans
- Koko (gorilla)
