= Barker (surname) =

- Pronunciation: English: /ˈbɑːrkər/
- Language: English

Origin
- Language: English
- Origin: metonymic occupational name
- Meaning: "a tanner of leather"

Barker is a surname of English origin, meaning "a tanner of leather". Barker may refer to:

== A–C ==
- Abraham Andrews Barker (1816–1898), American politician
- Al Barker (1839–1912), American baseball player
- Alfred Charles Barker (1819–1873), New Zealand doctor and photographer
- Arj Barker (born 1974), American comedian, actor
- Arthur "Doc" Barker (1899–1939), American criminal
- Ashlynd Barker (born 2003), American football player
- Audrey Barker (1932–2002), British artist
- Ben Barker (racing driver) (born 1991), British racing driver
- Ben Barker (speedway rider) (born 1988), British speedway rider
- Benjamin Barker, known as Sweeney Todd, fictional killer, barber
- Bernard Barker (1917–2009), Watergate burglar
- Bertie Thomas Percival Barker (1877–1961), English pomologist and professor of applied biology
- Betty Barker (1921–2018), American politician
- Bill Barker (police officer), died in the November 2009 Great Britain and Ireland floods
- Bob Barker (1923–2023), American game show host
- Brett Barker, American politician
- Burt Brown Barker (1873–1969), Oregon preservationist, administrator
- Cam Barker (born 1986), Canadian ice hockey player
- Charles Spackman Barker (1804–1879), British inventor and organ builder
- Cheryl Barker (born 1960), Australian opera singer
- Chris Barker (1980–2020), English footballer
- Christopher Barker (c.1529–1599), printer to Queen Elizabeth I
- Cicely Mary Barker (1895–1973), British illustrator who created the Flower Fairies
- Cliff Barker (1921–1998), American basketball player
- Clive Barker (artist, born 1940), Pop Art sculptor
- Clive Barker (born 1952), British horror author
- Collet Barker (1784–1831), British explorer in South Australia

== D–K ==
- Darren Barker (born 1982), British boxer
- David G. Barker (born 1952), American herpetologist
- Dean Barker (Born 1973), New Zealand yachtsman
- Dominic Barker (born 1966), British children's author
- E. Florence Barker (1840–1897), American clubwoman; first president of the National Woman's Relief Corps
- Ed Barker (American football) (1931–2012), American football player
- Eddie Barker (1927–2012), American journalist
- Edmund Henry Barker (1788–1839), British classical scholar
- Edward Barker (disambiguation), several people
- Edwin Barker (born 1954), American classical bassist
- Eileen Barker (born 1938), British sociologist
- Elinor Barker (born 1994), British racing cyclist
- Elspeth Barker (1940–2022), Scottish novelist and journalist
- Elwood Barker (1878–1953), American politician
- Emily Barker (born 1980), Australian singer-songwriter
- Ernest Barker (1874–1960), an English political scientist and writer
- Eugene C. Barker (1874–1956), American historian
- Evelyn Barker (1894–1983), British General
- George Barker (disambiguation)
- Glyn Barker (born 1953), British businessman
- Gordon Barker (1931–2006), English cricketer
- Guy Barker, (born 1957), English jazz trumpeter and composer
- Hanna Marie Barker (born 1996), American soccer player
- Harley Granville-Barker (1877–1946), English actor, director, producer, critic and playwright
- Helen Morton Barker (1834–1910), American social reformer
- Henry Rodman Barker (1841–1901), Mayor of Providence, Rhode Island 1889–91
- Herbert Barker (1883–1924), English golfer and golf course architect
- Horace Barker (1907–2000), American biochemist and microbiologist
- Howard Barker (born 1946), British playwright
- Jack Barker (English footballer) (1907–1982), English footballer
- Jacob Barker (1779–1871), American financier
- James Barker (disambiguation)
- Jane Barker (1652–1732), British poet and novelist
- Janiah Barker (born 2003), American basketball player
- Jared Barker (born 1975), Canadian rugby player
- Jeff Barker (disambiguation)
- John Barker (disambiguation)
- Jonathan Dylan Barker (born 1971), American writer
- Joseph Barker (disambiguation)
- Joshua Barker Flint (1801–1864), American physician
- Joshua Barker, American politician
- Kathleen Frances Barker (1901–1963), English author and book illustrator
- Kenneth Barker (academic) (1934–2021), British academic administrator
- Kenneth Barker (cricketer) (1877–1938), English cricketer
- Kenneth L. Barker (born 1931), biblical Hebrew scholar and translator of the NASB and NIV English Bibles
- Kevin Barker (born 1975), baseball player

== L–Q ==
- Larry Barker (born 1946), American politician
- Len Barker (born 1955), baseball pitcher
- Les Barker (1947–2023), British comedian
- Lex Barker (1919–1973), American actor, known for his Tarzan films and German Cowboy films
- Lloyd Barker (born 1943), Barbadian cricket umpire
- Lloyd Barker (soccer) (born 1970), Jamaican footballer and coach
- Lucette Barker (1816–1905), English painter
- Luke Barker (American football) (born 1991), American college football coach
- Luke Barker (born 1992), American baseball player
- M. A. R. Barker (born Philip Barker), (1929–2012), retired professor, fantasy novels and roleplaying games writer
- Ma Barker (1873–1935), reputed American gang leader
- Margaret Barker (actress) (1908–1992), American actress, director, producer, educator, and playwright
- Margaret Barker (artist) (1907–2003), British artist
- Margaret Barker (theologian) (born 1944), British Methodist preacher and biblical scholar
- Matthew Henry Barker (1790–1846), an English sailor, journalist, newspaper editor and writer of sea tales
- Maurice Barker (1917–2000), English cricketer
- Meg-John Barker (born 1974), British author, academic, activist and psychotherapist
- Merton Barker (1867–1954), English cricketer and international field hockey player
- Mickey Barker (born 1956), English footballer
- Mike or Michael Barker (disambiguation)
- Mildred Barker (1897–1990), Shaker leader, musician, scholar, and theologian
- Nick Barker (Australian musician), Australian singer-songwriter and guitarist
- Nick Barker (drummer) (born 1973), British heavy metal drummer
- Nigel Barker (disambiguation)
- Pat Barker (born 1943), British author
- Paul Barker (born 1958), American bass guitarist
- Paul Barker (writer) (1968–1986), editor of New Society
- Paula Barker (born 1972), British Member of Parliament elected 2019
- Peter Barker (disambiguation)
- Phil Barker (born 1932), British wargame designer
- Phillip Barker, Canadian-British artist and film director
- Pierre A. Barker (1790–1870), American politician, mayor of Buffalo, New York

== R–Z ==
- Raffaella Barker (born 1964), English writer and columnist
- Ralph Barker (1917–2011), English writer on the RAF
- Reginald Barker (1886–1945), film director
- Robert Barker (disambiguation)
- Roger Barker (1903–1990), American psychologist
- Ronnie Barker (1929–2005), British comedy actor
- S. Omar Barker (1894–1985), American cowboy poet, politician rancher, and teacher
- Sally Barker (born 1959), British singer and songwriter
- Sam Barker, known professionally as Barker, American musician and record producer
- Samuel Barker (Canadian politician) (1839–1915), Canadian parliamentarian and lawyer
- Samuel Barker (Hebraist) (1686–1759), English Hebraist
- Samuel Barker (MP for Cricklade) (c. 1659–1708), British member of Parliament for Cricklade
- Sarah Ashlee Barker (born 2001), American basketball player
- Shaun Barker (born 1982), English footballer
- Simon Barker (born 1964), English footballer
- Stephen F. Barker (1927–2019), American philosopher of mathematics
- Sue Barker (born 1956), British television presenter and former professional tennis player
- Thomas Barker (disambiguation)
- Tracy M. Barker (born 1957), American herpetologist
- Travis Barker (born 1975), American drummer for the bands Blink 182, Plus-44, Box Car Racer
- Trevor Barker (1956–1996), Australian rules footballer, died of cancer
- Wende Barker, Wyoming politician
- Wes Barker (born 1986), Canadian magician
- Wharton Barker (1846–1921), American financier
- Will Barker (director) (1867–1951), film producer, director, cinematographer
- William Barker (disambiguation)
- Wright Barker (1863–1941), British artist

== See also ==
- Justice Barker (disambiguation)
