= Kenneth Barker =

Kenneth Barker may refer to:

- Kenneth L. Barker (born 1931), American biblical scholar
- Kenneth Barker (musicologist) (1934–2021), British academic administrator
- Kenneth Barker (cricketer) (1877–1938), English cricketer
