= George Barker =

George Barker may refer to:

== Politics and government ==
- George Barker (British politician) (1858–1936), Member of Parliament for Abertillery, Wales
- George Barker (Virginia politician) (born 1951), Member of the Virginia State Senate
- George Digby Barker (1833–1914), British soldier and colonial administrator
- George P. Barker (1807–1848), New York State Attorney General
- George R. Barker (1881–1958), member of the Legislative Assembly of Alberta 1917–1921
- George W. Barker (1804–1873), American businessman and public official in Vermont and Wisconsin

== Arts and literature ==
- George Barker (painter) (1882–1965), American portrait and landscape painter
- George Barker (photographer) (1844–1894), Canadian-American photographer known for his pictures of Niagara Falls
- George Barker (poet) (1913–1991), English poet and author
- George Arthur Barker (1812–1876), English song composer

== Sports ==
- George Barker (Cambridge University cricketer) (1819–1893), English cricketer
- George Barker (Marylebone cricketer) (1831–1869), English cricketer and barrister
- George Barker (footballer, born 1875), English footballer
- George Barker (footballer, born 1885) (1885–1947), Australian rules footballer
- George Barker (footballer, born 1991), English footballer
- George Barker (footballer, born 1916) (1916–1993), Australian rules footballer
- George H. Barker (1901–1986), athlete and coach in Tennessee

== Others ==
- George Barker (benefactor) (1776–1845), British scientist and philanthropist
- George E. Barker (1930–2014), British philatelist
- George Frederick Barker (1835–1910), American scientist and professor
- George Robert Barker (1817–1861), British soldier knighted in 1859 for distinguished services during the Indian Mutiny

== See also ==
- George Barker Jeffery (1891–1957), English mathematician
- George Baker (disambiguation)
