= William Barker =

William Barker may refer to:

== Politicians ==
- William Barker (translator) (fl. 1570), English translator and MP for Great Yarmouth and Bramber
- William Barker (MP for Berkshire) (died 1685), English Member of Parliament for Berkshire
- Sir William Barker, 5th Baronet (1685–1731), British Member of Parliament for Ipswich, Thetford and Suffolk
- William Barker (Queensland politician) (1819–1886), member of the Queensland Legislative Council
- William F. Barker (1823–1895), American merchant and politician
- William J. Barker (Denver mayor) (1832–1900), American politician

== Judges ==
- William J. Barker (1886–1968), American lawyer and judge
- William M. Barker (1941–2023), Chief Justice of the Tennessee Supreme Court from 1995 to 2009

== Sportspeople ==
- William Barker (Surrey cricketer) (1857–?), English cricketer
- William Barker (tennis) (born 1981), British tennis player
- Billy Barker (footballer, born 1883) (1883–1937), footballer for Middlesbrough F.C. in the early 20th century; see List of Middlesbrough F.C. players
- Bill Barker (footballer) (1924–2002), footballer who played for Stoke City
- Will Barker (American football) (born 1987), American football player

== Religion ==
- William Barker (priest, died 1776), Irish priest, Dean of Raphoe
- William Barker (priest, died 1917) (1838–1917), Dean of Carlisle
- William Morris Barker (1854–1901), American bishop of the Episcopal Diocese of Olympia

== Others ==
- William Barker (chemist) (1810–1873), Irish professor of chemistry
- William Barker (prospector) (1817–1894), English miner and prospector who found gold in Canada
- William Burckhardt Barker (1810–1856), English orientalist
- William George Barker (1894–1930), Canadian Victoria Cross recipient and World War I flying ace
- William Gibbs Barker (c. 1811–1897), English clergyman and genealogist
- William Higgs Barker (1744–1815), English Hebraist
- William Robert Barker, Australian botanist
- William S. Barker (born 1934), American church historian, educator, and leader
- Will Barker (director) (1867–1951), aka William George Barker, English film producer and director
- Bill Barker (born 1957), creator of Schwa, underground conceptual artwork
- Bill Barker, police officer who died in the November 2009 Great Britain and Ireland floods, namesake of Barker Crossing
- Bill Barker, actor who portrayed Dr. Duckbill Platypus and Elsie Jean Platypus on Mister Rogers' Neighborhood
