= Joseph Barker =

Joseph Barker may refer to:

- Joseph Barker (Massachusetts politician) (1751–1815), American Congregationalist minister and U.S. Representative from Massachusetts
- Joseph Barker (mayor) (1806–1862), American mayor of Pittsburgh remembered for his nativist and anti-Catholic activism
- Joseph Barker (minister) (1806–1875), English preacher, author, and controversialist
- Joseph Barker (priest) (1834–1924), Anglican priest in South Africa
- Joseph Scott Barker (born 1963), American Episcopal clergyman
- Joseph Warren Barker (1891–1975), American electrical and mechanical engineer

== See also ==
- Joe Baker (1940–2003), England international footballer
- Colonel Joseph Barker House, an historic residence in Washington County, Ohio
- Barker (surname)
