= Bob Barker (disambiguation) =

Bob Barker (1923 – 2023) was an American media personality, game show host, and animal rights advocate. The name may also refer to:

- Bob Barker (rugby union) (born 1944), the former rugby union wing
- MY Bob Barker, the ship of the activist group Sea Shepherd
- Bob Barker Company, the prison supply company

== See also ==
- Robert Barker (disambiguation)
