= Alfred Lewis Jones =

Welsh businessman (1845–1909)

Sir Alfred Lewis Jones KCMG comYC
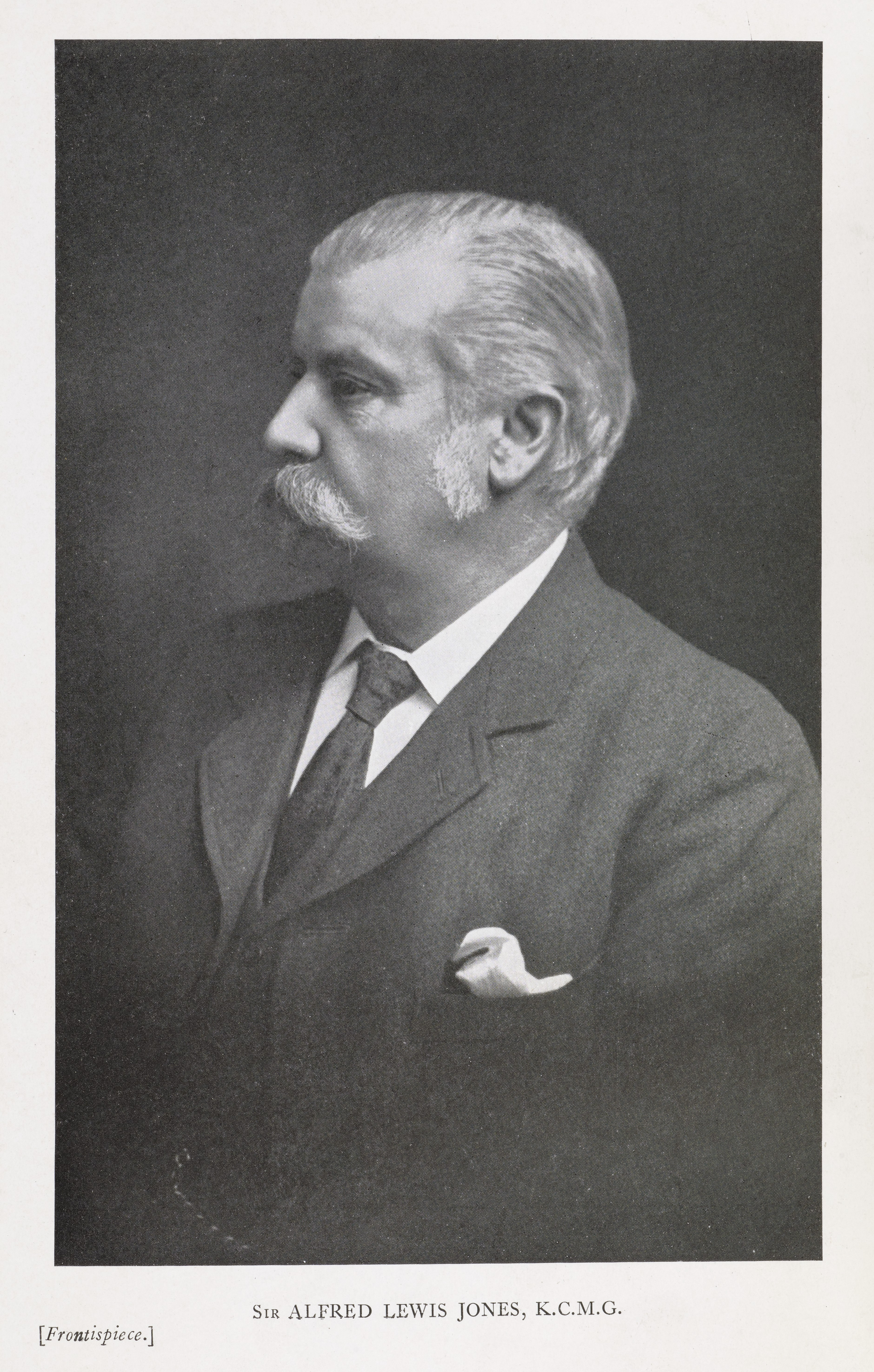
- Half length portrait of Sir Alfred Lewis Jones
- Born: 24 February 1845; Carmarthen, Wales
- Died: 13 December 1909; Liverpool, England
- Monuments: Memorial of Sir Alfred Lewis Jones, Liverpool
- Occupations: Businessman; ship-owner
- Title: Founder of the Liverpool School of Tropical Medicine; Founder of the First Bank of Nigeria; Chairman of the Bank of British West Africa; Chairman of the Liverpool Institute of Tropical Research; President of the British Cotton Growing Association; President of the Liverpool Chamber of Commerce; Senior Partner of Elder Dempster and Company
- Political party: Conservative Party (UK)
- Awards: KCMG

Sir Alfred Lewis Jones KCMG comYC (24 February 1845 – 13 December 1909) was a Welsh businessman and ship-owner. Described by W. T. Stead as "The Uncrowned King of West Africa", Jones was a pre-eminent figure in the colonial shipping trade who amassed considerable business through his many exploits. He was also regarded as a public benefactor in later life and through the execution of his will.

== Early life ==
Jones was born on 24 February 1845 in Carmarthen, Wales. His father was Daniel Jones, owner of The Welshman and the only son of Charles Jones, who served the office of Mayor of Carmarthen from 1839 to 1840. His mother was Mary Jean Williams, the eldest daughter of the Rev. Henry Williams, rector of Llanedi. When Jones was three years old, they moved to Liverpool. His own description of his childhood was that it was "happy and uneventful." He could not remember "any amusing escapades or stirring adventures." Jones excelled at arithmetic and was very keen on swimming and sailing.

== Career ==
=== Early career ===
At the age of twelve, Jones was apprenticed to the managers of the African Steamship Company at Liverpool on the recommendation of the ship's master, making several voyages to the west coast of Africa.

By the time he was twenty-six, he had risen to be manager of the business. Not finding sufficient scope in this post, he borrowed money to purchase two or three small sailing vessels, and started in the shipping business on his own account. The venture succeeded, and he made additions to his fleet, but after a few years' successful trading, realizing that sailing ships were about to be superseded by steamers, he sold his vessels.

=== Elder, Dempster & Co. ===
Jones took a keen interest in imperial affairs. He acquired considerable territorial interests in West Africa, where he acquired considerable land and business, and financial interests in many of the companies engaged in opening up and developing that part of the world. He was the first merchant to import bananas to England in 1884 and became a friend of the Fyffe family. The ships of the Elder, Dempster & Co. line eventually became known as the "banana boats."

His activity in this field urged Joseph Chamberlain, the colonial secretary, to persuade him to do the same for the Jamaican banana trade. It proved to be a costly venture. Winston Churchill, while at the Colonial Office, would come to know Jones well.

Messrs. Elder, Dempster & Co., who purchased the business of the old African Steamship Company, offered Jones a managerial post in 1891. This offer he accepted, subject to Messrs. Elder, Dempster selling him a number of their shares, and he thus acquired an interest in the business, and subsequently, by further share purchases, its control. Elder Dempster employed both E.D. Morel and Roger Casement, who in time became bitter enemies of Jones.

In the same year, Jones received a request from King Leopold II of Belgium to dampen British criticism of human rights abuses in the Congo. He thusly sponsored the travels of novelist May French Sheldon. While in the Congo, she traveled on steamboats owned by the state and its company allies, who controlled where she went and what she saw. When she returned to England, Jones placed her articles in the newspapers. She stated "I have witnessed more atrocities in London streets than I have ever seen in the Congo."

Growing success made it necessary to enter other fields, which meant establishing the Bank of British West Africa and the purchase of cartage and chandler's companies and many other subsidiaries, all of which grew into an empire that included over 100 ships of the Elder Dempster Lines.

=== Later career and monopolies ===
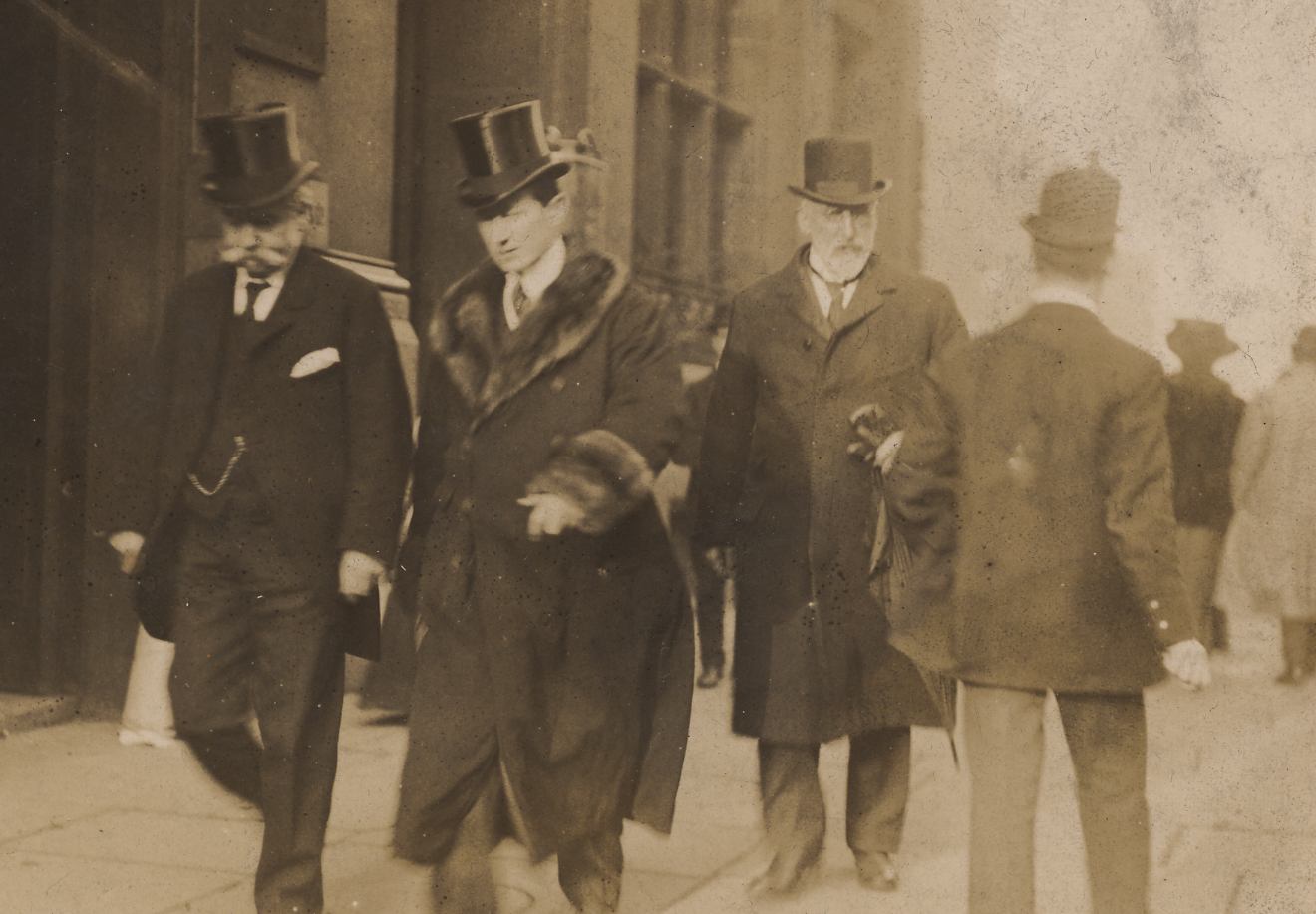
Jones (left) with Guglielmo Marconi (middle) and Thomas Henry Barker (right)

By the mid 1890s, Jones was not only the pre-eminent figure in the West African shipping trade but also had a dominant presence on land. In addition to his coastal and river services, Jones ran hotels, cold storage, victualling, chandlery, cartage, oil mills, plantations, collieries and other mines.

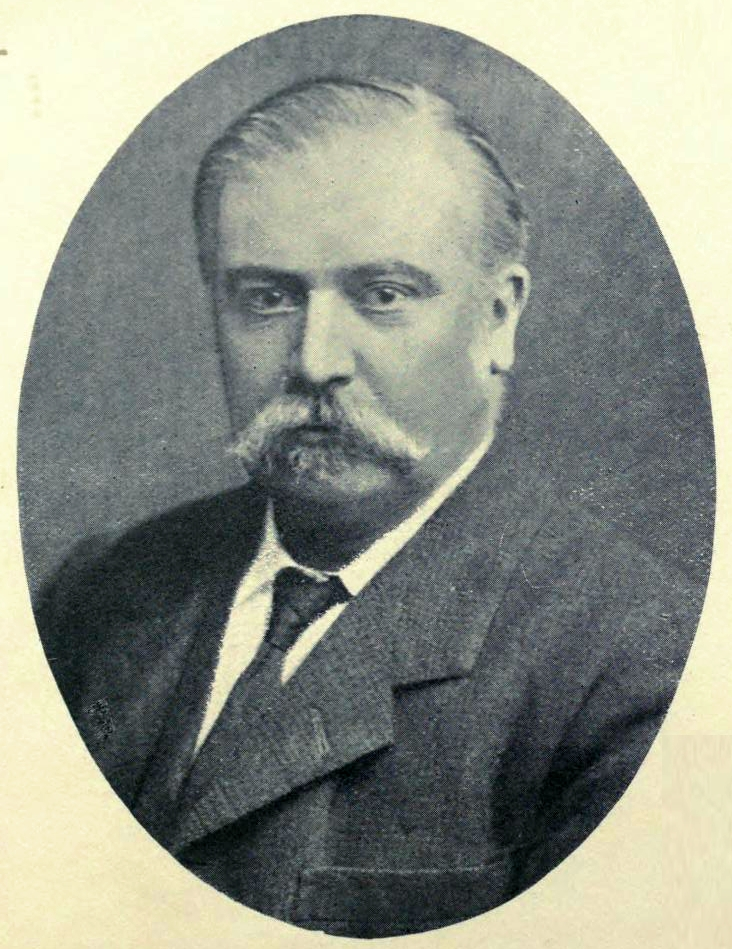

As a result of increased trade with West Africa, Britain saw a dramatic increase in tropical diseases in the latter half of the 19th century. In response to an appeal by Joseph Chamberlain, Jones proposed to contribute £350 per annum for three years to the study of tropical medicine at the Annual Dinner of the students of the Royal Southern Hospital on 12 November 1898. William Adamson, president of the hospital, accepted his offer, and proposals were drawn up to form the Liverpool School of Tropical Diseases, which would later become the Liverpool School of Tropical Medicine.

In the early 1900s, Jones had a monopoly on the Congo-Antwerp mail traffic as well as consular duties representing King Leopold II's Congo State in Liverpool. He had myriad interests. In 1900, in order to supply his ships with bunker fuel and support his coaling stations in the Canary Islands and Sierra Leone, he formed Elder's Navigation Collieries Ltd. and bought the Oakwood and Garth Merthyr colleries near Maesteg in the Llynfi Valley, South Wales. The need for coal-bunkering facilities along the West African trade route caused him to establish, among others, a major depot at Las Palmas.

Jones took the leading part in opening up a new line of communication with the West Indies, and in stimulating the Jamaica fruit trade and tourist traffic. He also developed the tourist trade in the Canary Islands and the banana industry there. While chairman of the Bank of British West Africa, he had been interested in cotton growing in West Africa and had even distributed cotton seed there. As a result, in 1902, he was approached, and became, inaugural President of the British Cotton Growing Association. In June 1903, he became chairman of the Liverpool Institute of Tropical Research, president of the Liverpool Chamber of Commerce, and a member of Joseph Chamberlain's tariff commission, formed in 1904. He was also appointed a justice of the peace (JP) for Liverpool.

=== Decorations and honours ===
Jones was appointed a Knight Commander of the Most Distinguished Order of St Michael and St George (KCMG) in the 1901 Birthday Honours list on 9 November 1901 "in recognition of services to the West African Colonies, and to Jamaica", and invested as such by King Edward VII at St James's Palace on 17 December 1901. In May 1902, he was elected an Honorary Fellow of Jesus College, Oxford.

He was also the recipient of many foreign decorations, from Belgium, Russia, Portugal, Liberia and others. In 1906, King Alfonso XIII of Spain conferred on him the Order of Isabella the Catholic in recognition of "the great services rendered by Sir Alfred in promoting agriculture in and generally developing the trade and commerce of the Canary Islands." In the same year, Jones had entertained the King on his visit to the Canaries.

== Death, will and memorials ==
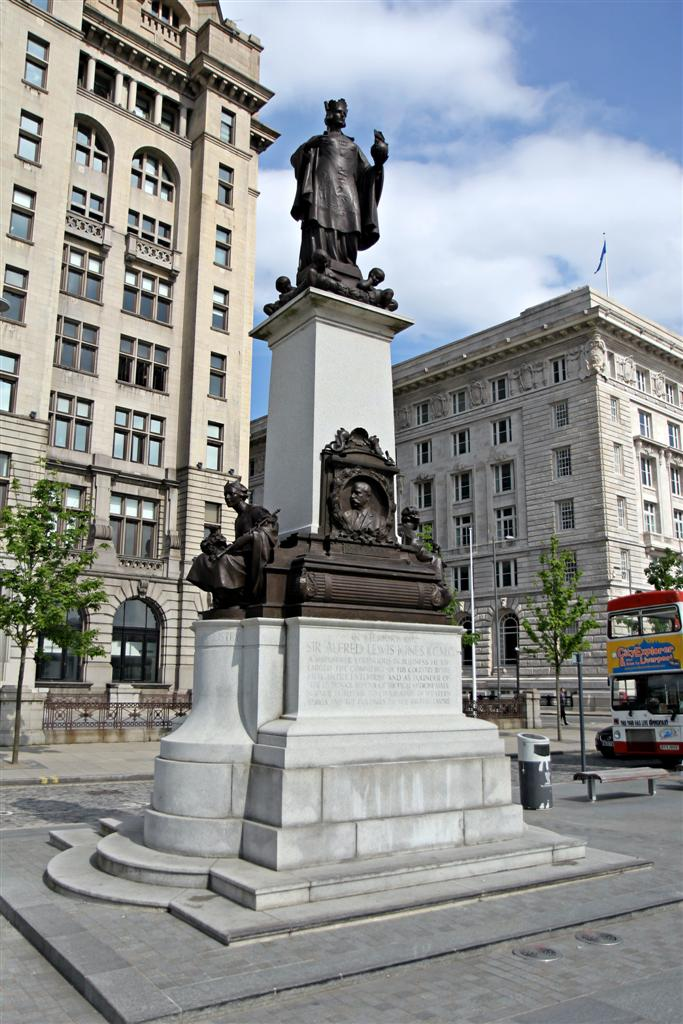
Memorial, Liverpool

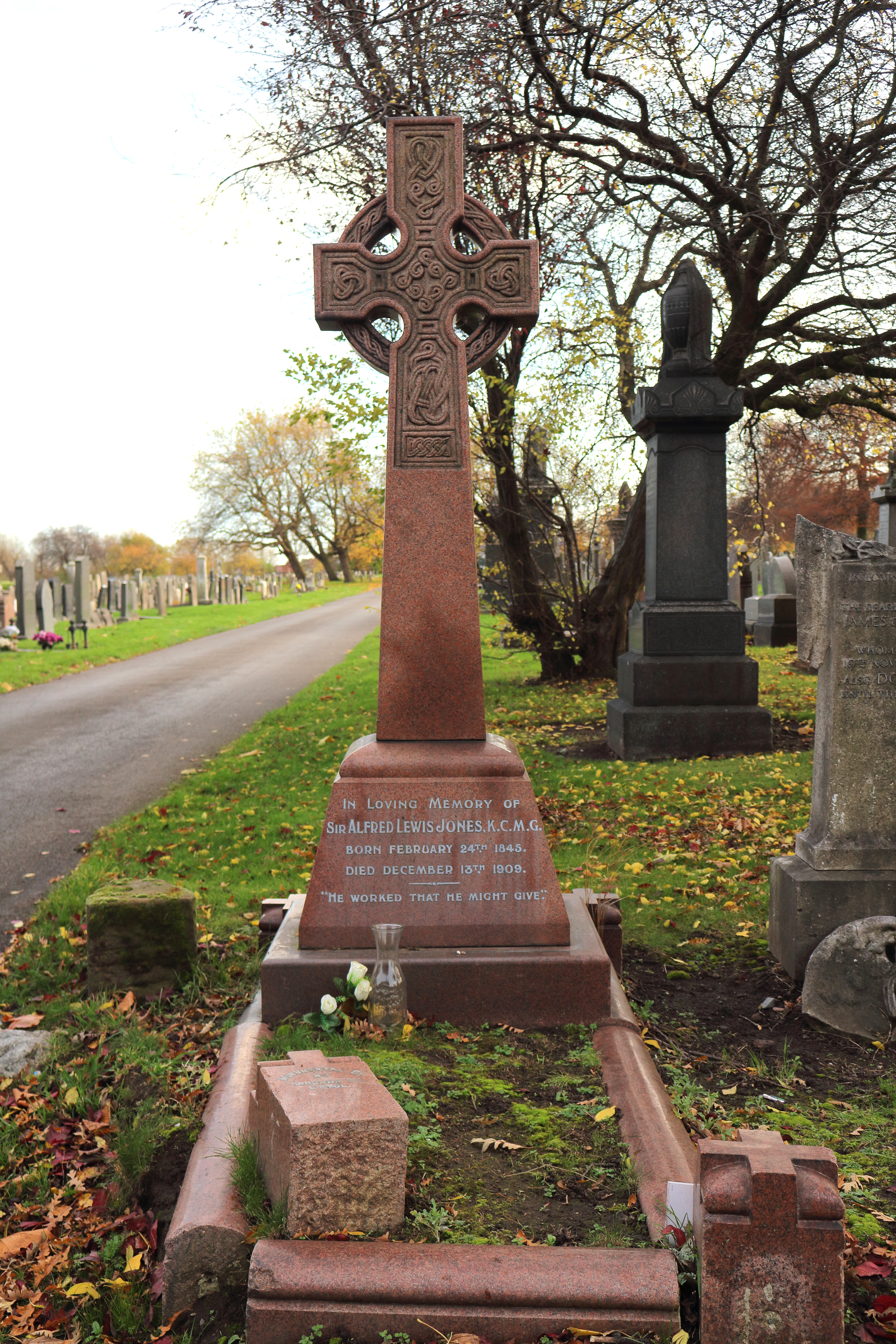
Memoriam, Anfield

A fortnight before his death, Jones contracted a chill while travelling home from London. He attended a farewell dinner to Sir Hesketh Bell on 7 December 1909, despite poor health, and was confined to his house thereafter. Jones died on 13 December 1909 in Liverpool. He was buried in Anfield Cemetery, where the epitaph reads "He worked that he might give."

Having never married, Jones' eldest niece's husband Owen Harrison Williams was the executor of his will. Williams was for twenty years occupied in the managing of this gross estate, which amounted to over £670,000 (in excess of £65 million today). Many hundreds of individuals, charities and institutions would benefit from his will.

The remainder of his estate was turned into a charitable trust, which distributed hundreds of thousands of pounds to worthy causes. Jones suggested to his trustees that his wealth be directed towards "the technical education of natives on the West Coast of Africa, original research into the cause of disease on that coast, the advancement of education of science, the relief of the poverty of any deserving person in the employ of any company in which [he] was interested, and the assistance of any charitable object which would benefit Liverpool or the West Coast of Africa."

In 1913, the Memorial of Sir Alfred Lewis Jones, a commemorative bust length by George Frampton, was unveiled at Pier Head, Liverpool.

The Sir Alfred Jones Memorial Hospital was formally opened on 23 February 1916. It was demolished in 2009 and, in tribute, the Sir Alfred Jones Memorial Garden was dedicated. A number of other sites are dedicated to Sir Alfred, including the Sir Alfred Jones Research Laboratory in Freetown, Sierra Leone and the Sir Alfred Jones Trade School.

== Legacy ==
By the time of his death, Jones controlled a fleet of 101 ships (totalling over 300,000 gross tonnage), and was senior partner in at least twenty companies and chairman of five.

Jones is credited with introducing the banana to Britain. His importing of bananas, tomatoes, and other fruit to Britain led to a constant stream of ships arriving into London's South Quay Dock and the naming of Canary Wharf, after the ships' origin.

Jones' enterprise revitalised the Canary Islands to the extent of providing hotels and encouraging tourism. Through his business endeavours, he "put the Canaries on the map." Alfredo L Jones Street, a main street in Las Palmas de Gran Canaria, is named after him.

Jones received criticism for his "special relationship" with King Leopold II of Belgium, being regarded as consul for the Congo Free State. E. D. Morel, a bitter enemy of Jones, wrote in his obituary "Had Sir Alfred Jones come forward as the defender of the Congolese, the Congo tragedy would have been terminated long years ago."
