= Michael Barker =

Michael or Mike Barker may refer to:

- Michael Barker (British Army officer) (1884–1960), British Army general
- Michael Barker (drummer) (born 1966), New Zealand percussionist
- Michael Barker (judge), of the Supreme Court of Western Australia and the Federal Court of Australia
- Michael Barker (film distributor), co-president and co-founder of Sony Pictures Classics
- Mike Barker (director) (born 1965), film and television director
- Mike Barker (producer) (born 1968), co-creator of American Dad!
- Mickey Barker (born 1956), English football player
