= Thomas Barker =

Thomas or Tom Barker may refer to:

== Arts and entertainment ==
- Thomas Barker (painter) (1769–1847), British painter of landscape and rural life
- Thomas Jones Barker (1813–1882), English historical and portrait painter
- Tom Barker (designer) (born 1966), British designer and academic

== Law and politics ==
- Thomas Barker (Australian politician) (1799–1875), Australian politician in New South Wales
- Thomas F. Barker (1828–1896), Canadian politician in New Brunswick
- Thomas William Barker (1861–1912), Welsh solicitor

== Sports ==
- Thomas Barker (fishing guide) (fl. 1591–1651), British fishing guide
- Thomas Barker (cricketer, born 1798) (1798–1877), English cricketer
- Thomas Barker (cricketer, born 1812) (1812–1873), English cricketer
- Tom Barker (basketball) (born 1955), American basketball player
- Tom Barker (rugby union) (born 1956), Australian rugby union player

== Others ==
- Thomas Barker (meteorologist) (1722–1809), English weather observer
- Thomas Barker (academic) (c. 1728–1785), principal of Brasenose College, Oxford
- Thomas Richard Barker (1799–1870), English Independent minister and college tutor
- Thomas Holliday Barker (1818–1889), English temperance advocate and vegetarian
- Thomas Barker (mathematician) (1838–1907), Scottish mathematician and professor of pure mathematics
- Thomas Henry Barker (1841–1917), secretary of the Liverpool Chamber of Commerce
- Tom Barker (trade unionist) (1887–1970), New Zealand tram conductor, trade unionist and socialist
