= May French Sheldon =

American novelist

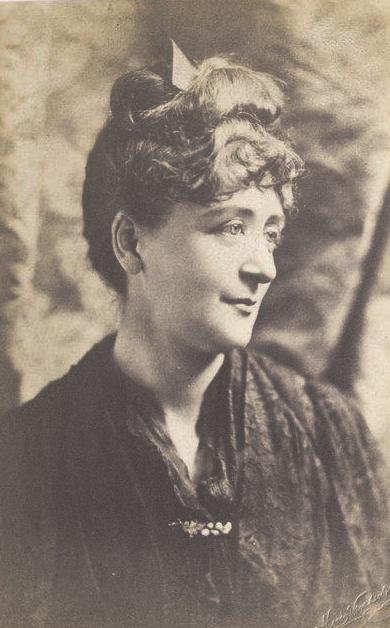
Sheldon in 1891

Mary French Sheldon (10 May 1847 – 10 February 1936), as author May French Sheldon, was an American writer and explorer.

== Early years and education ==
Mary French was born May 10, 1847, at Bridgewater, Pennsylvania. Her father was Joseph French, a civil engineer, and her mother Elizabeth J. French (née Poorman), a spiritualist who later practiced "galvanic medicine" in Boston, as did her sister, Dr. Belle French Patterson.

She was educated in the United States and overseas, studying art and developing into an author and ethnologist.

== Career ==
In 1876, she married an American, Eli Lemon Sheldon (1848-1892), a banker and author, and they moved to London where they established publishing firms.

Sheldon is noted as a translator of Flaubert's Salammbô, and was the author of papers and essays. As a writer, Sheldon wrote a number of novels, short stories, and essays.

She acquired fame for an expedition. In 1891, inspired by the activities of Henry Morton Stanley, who was a family friend, she left London for Africa. She wrote Sultan to Sultan about this expedition. Her next trip to Africa was sponsored by Sir Alfred Jones, who had been requested by King Leopold II of Belgium to dampen British criticism of human rights abuses in the Congo. While in the Congo Free State, she traveled on steamboats owned by the state and its company allies, who controlled where she went and what she saw.

When she returned to England, Jones helped place her articles in newspapers. She stated "I have witnessed more atrocities in London streets than I have ever seen in the Congo." She gave a presentation/slide show for an audience of five hundred at the Savoy Hotel in London, with expenses paid by King Leopold. Thereafter, the king paid her a monthly salary to lobby members of Parliament.

She obtained assistance from African peoples as she explored around Lake Chala in her 1891 expedition. Her journey from Mombassa to Mount Kilimanjaro caused a sensation because she was not accompanied by a white companion (although she was hardly unaccompanied -– she had 150 Zanzibari porters and guides). She returned with ethnographic materials, wrote on her experience, and undertook a lecture tour.

French Sheldon received multiple awards for her exhibition at the World's Columbian Exposition, and was appointed membership in societies such as the Writer's Club and the Anthropological Society of Washington. She was made a fellow of the Royal Geographical Society, among the first fifteen women to receive this honour, in November 1892.

She died in London on 10 February 1936, with a funeral at Golders Green Crematorium.
