= Judge Barker =

Judge Barker may refer to:

- J. Campbell Barker (born 1980), judge of the United States District Court for the Eastern District of Texas
- Pamela Barker (born 1957), judge of the United States District Court for the Northern District of Ohio
- Sarah Evans Barker (born 1943), judge of the United States District Court for the Southern District of Indiana
- William J. Barker (1886–1968), judge of the United States District Court for the Southern District of Florida

== See also ==
- Justice Barker (disambiguation)
