= Audrey Barker =

British artist (1932–2002)

Audrey Melville Barker
- Born: 1 November 1932; West Ham, London, UK
- Died: 25 August 2002 (aged 69)
- Education: Walthamstow School of Art; Leicester College of Art
- Occupation: Artist
- Known for: Installation art
- Spouse: Denis Barker (m. 1961)

Audrey Melville Barker (1 November 1932 – 25 August 2002) was a British artist who in the later stages of her long career created installation pieces that pioneered ideas on disability and access.

== Biography ==
Barker was born in the West Ham area of East London. During World War II, she was evacuated to a rural farm where she contracted tuberculosis. This led to years of hospital treatment and long-term bone damage and arthritis. Despite missing long periods of schooling, Barker gained a scholarship to East Ham Grammar School for Girls in 1944. Between 1950 and 1955, she attended Walthamstow School of Art before taking a one-year teacher training qualification at the Leicester College of Art. In 1961, she married the artist and teacher Denis Barker and moved to Cumberland. She taught at both the University of Newcastle and at the Carlisle College of Art and began to develop installation pieces which she called environments and included compartmented assemblages. She invited performers and poets, including Adrian Henri, to participate in these events. One of her compartmented assemblages won the Abbot Hall Art Gallery prize in 1964. These works were too radical for the traditional Carlisle College authorities, who fired her.

A brief spell in New York, working with Joseph Cornell, in 1966, followed. Late in 1967, Barker had an exhibition, shared with Sylvester Houédard, at the Lisson Gallery that featured assemblages some of which she displayed in compartmented trays. A series of further illnesses limited Barker's artistic output throughout the 1970s but she and her husband did establish a business, which was shown at the LYC Museum and Art Gallery in 1973. Barker hosted doll-making workshops at this Museum as well. Their business, Barkers of Lanercost, produced period costume dolls, soft toys and reproductions of artefacts from the Roman fort at Vindolanda. This business also produced screen-prints and hooked rugs made with material from the Otterburn mill. As the business developed, the couple purchased and restored a mill building at Lanercost which they developed into a small arts centre and work space for people with disabilities. The business collapsed in 1987 and the couple divorced shortly after.

In the late 1980s and early 1990s, Barker began to develop a series of multisensory installations that explored ideas about disability and accessibility. The largest of these was the Festival of the Five Senses which, in 1989, filled a leisure centre in Hexham with artists, actors and musicians. The installation attracted large crowds and the Institute of Contemporary Arts in London were keen to host the work but Barker refused as the space offered was not fully accessible. Her final installation was Art: An Illusion at the Keswick Art Gallery in 2000. In 1993, Barker accepted a woman of the decade award from the Arts Council for her work on disabilities and the arts but is understood to have refused the award of an MBE.
