= Memorial of Sir Alfred Lewis Jones, Liverpool =

Commemorative statue in Liverpool, England

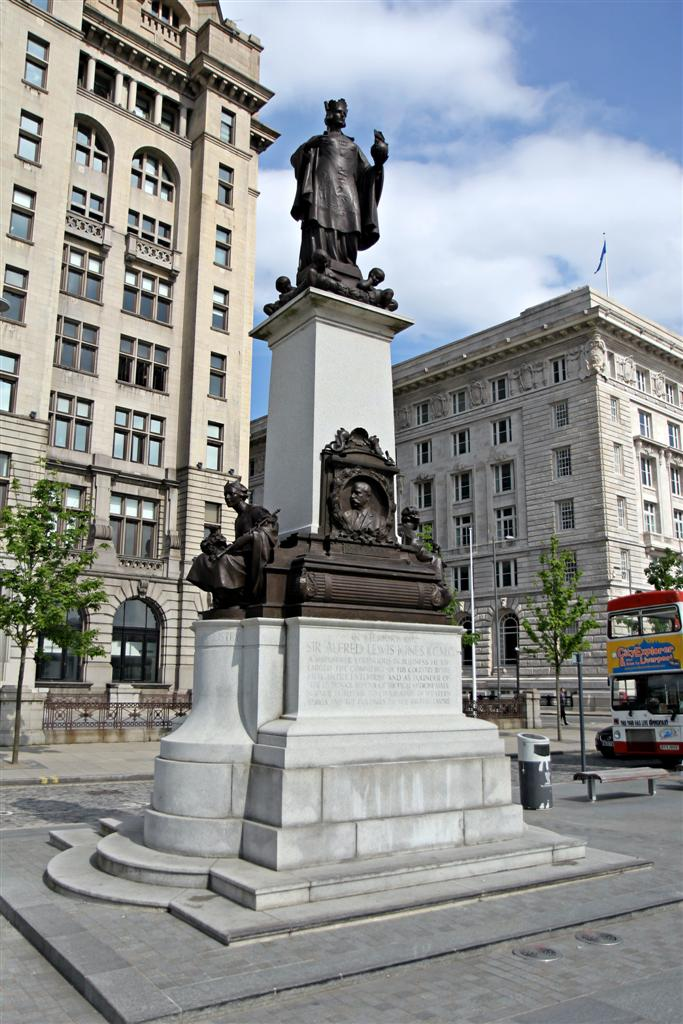
- The statue in 2012
- Artist: George Frampton
- Year: 1913
- Subject: Sir Alfred Lewis Jones
- Location: Pier Head, Liverpool

The Memorial of Sir Alfred Lewis Jones in Liverpool is a commemorative memorial at bust length of Sir Alfred Lewis Jones (1845–1909) and a statue of the personification of Liverpool standing in the riverside area of Pier Head in Liverpool, created in 1913 by George Frampton. It is Grade II listed.

== Overview ==
The statue is situated in Pier Head, a district at the centre of Liverpool's mercantile business centre, where a collection of landmark buildings and memorials are located.

At the uppermost part of the memorial statue is the personification of the City of Liverpool, it is decorated with the city's heraldic symbols and has a crown and tabard. She is holding a globe on which is balanced a small ship. Below, on either side, are two statues of women that depict Research and the Fruits of Industry, in view of Sir Alfred Lewis Jones' introduction of the banana to Britain.

Below the bust length portrait, the plaque states "In memory of Sir Alfred Lewis Jones KCMG; a shipowner strenuous in business, he enlarged the commerce of his country by his mercantile enterprise and, as founder of the Liverpool School of Tropical Medicine, made science tributary in civilization in Western Africa and the colonies of the British Empire."
