= Jeff Barker =

Jeff Barker is the name of:

- Jeff Barker (footballer) (1915–1985), English football player
- Jeff Barker (politician) (born 1943), Democratic member of the Oregon House of Representatives

== See also ==
- Geoff Barker (1949–2022), English footballer
- Barker (surname)
