= William Barker (priest, died 1776) =

Irish Anglican priest

William Barker was an Anglican priest in Ireland.

Barker was educated at Trinity College, Dublin. He was Dean of Raphoe from 1757 until his death in 1776. His grandson was the second Anglican bishop of Sydney.
