= Lucette Barker =

British painter (1816-1905)

Lucette Elizabeth Barker (baptized 29 July 1816, died 21 January 1905) was a British painter of portraits, genre and animal subjects.

== Biography ==
Barker was born in Thirkleby in Yorkshire to Thomas Barker, a vicar, and his wife Jane Flower. Lucette Barker had three sisters, two of whom also became artists while the third was a composer. Although Thomas Barker taught his daughters to paint and draw and arranged private art lessions for them he was opposed to them working for a living. Despite this, Lucette Barker did undertake commercial work. She provided illustrations for a 1851 book, The Fairy Godmothers and Other Tales by Margaret Getty and exhibited several paintings in public. Between 1853 and 1874, Barker showed four paintings at the Royal Academy, one at the British Institution and several elsewhere, including at the Dudley Gallery. After living in Thirsk, in 1855 Lucette moved to London to live with her married sister, Laura. In London she moved in the artistic circles associated with Holland House, which included the actress Ellen Terry and the artist George Frederic Watts. After the 1870s Barker appears to have stopped exhibiting in public but continued to paint, producing presentation books of sketches and watercolours for family and friends. Barker, and the widowed Laura, retired to Coleshill, Buckinghamshire, near Amersham where she died in 1905.
