= Joseph Barker (priest) =

Joseph Barker (b Worcester 23 October 1834 – 1924) was an Anglican priest in South Africa in the late 19th and early 20th centuries.

Barker was educated at King Charles I School in Kidderminster. He went out to Natal as a missionary. He was ordained in 1862. After a curacy in Ladysmith he was Rector of Umzinto from 1861 to 1887. He was Archdeacon of Durban from 1878 to 1887; then Archdeacon of Maritzburg from 1887 to 1906, combining this with being Vicar of Ladysmith. He was appointed Dean of Maritzburg from 1906.

Barker was married and had a daughter Gertrude Maude Barker, who in 1902 married at Ladysmith to Clarence Meadows Montgomery.
