= George Barker (Marylebone cricketer) =

English cricketer and barrister

Personal information
- Full name: George William Barker
- Born: 8 August 1831; Stanlake Park, Berkshire, England
- Died: 10 September 1869 (aged 38); Stanlake Park, Berkshire, England
- Batting: Unknown

Domestic team information
- Years: Team
- 1854–1857: Marylebone Cricket Club

Career statistics
Competition	First-class
Matches	4
Runs scored	83
Batting average	13.83
100s/50s	–/–
Top score	31
Catches/stumpings	1/–
- Source: Cricinfo, 21 April 2021

George William Barker (8 August 1831 – 10 September 1869) was an English first-class cricketer and barrister.

The son of George Barker senior, he was born in August 1831 at Stanlake Park in Berkshire. He was educated at Rugby School, before going up to Christ Church, Oxford. After graduating from Oxford, Barker played first-class cricket for the Marylebone Cricket Club from 1854 to 1857, making four appearances: two in 1854 against Oxford University and Cambridge University, and two in 1857 against the same opponents. He scored 83 runs in these four matches, with a highest score of 31. A student of the Inner Temple, he was called to the bar in 1857. Barker died at Stanlake Park in September 1869, having been ill for ten days previous.
