= Peter Barker =

Peter Barker may refer to:

- Peter Barker (footballer) (born 1936), Australian rules footballer
- Peter Barker (physicist) (born 1967), Australian-born British physicist
- Peter Barker (sailor) (1955–2000), British Virgin Islands sailor
- Peter Barker (squash player) (born 1983), English squash player
