= Justice Barker =

Justice Barker may refer to:

- James Barker (judge) (1839–1905), associate justice of the Massachusetts Supreme Judicial Court
- Michael Barker (judge) (fl. 1970s–2010s), judge of the Supreme Court of Western Australia
- William M. Barker (born 1941), chief justice of the Tennessee Supreme Court

== See also ==
- Judge Barker (disambiguation)
