= Nigel Barker =

Nigel Barker may refer to:

- Nigel Barker (photographer) (born 1972), British photographer
- Nigel Barker (rugby league) (born 1955), English rugby league footballer of the 1970s and 1980s
- Nigel Barker (sprinter) (1883–1948), Australian Olympian
