= British Cotton Growing Association =

The British Cotton Growing Association (BCGA) was an organisation formed in 1902 from the various bodies connected with the Lancashire cotton industry which aimed to reduce that industry's dependence on supplies of raw cotton from the United States by promoting the development of cotton growing in the British Empire. It was described as a "semi-philanthropic" organisation, or combination of non-governmental organization, and a development agency, as it provided development funds without requiring any direct repayment, but did expect the Lancashire cotton industry to benefit indirectly in the longer term from the availability more secure cotton supplies.

The Association's operations initially involved distributing those varieties of cotton seed which would produce the types of cotton its members required and providing expertise, both at no cost, in British protectorates and colonies where climatic and soil conditions were favourable for growing cotton and later began to supply machinery and act as a selling agent for growers. From 1921, the British Government became increasingly dissatisfied with its anomalous position as a non-state organisation undertaking activities which were regarded as proper to the colonial administration and, in 1927, a governmental agency, the Empire Cotton Growing Corporation, took over most of the BCGA's work although the Association continued to operate as a trade representational body.

== History ==
In the last quarter of the 19th century, the Lancashire cotton industry obtained around three-quarters of its supplies of raw cotton from the United States, one sixth from India and the rest mainly from Egypt and Brazil. This was because Lancashire spinning machinery was generally adapted for medium-staple cotton such as American Upland cotton, rather than Indian short-staple cotton, used mainly for cheaper fabrics, or high-grade but expensive Egyptian long-staple types. By the end of that century, Lancashire was facing increasing competition from manufacturers in the US and India, both using their home-grown cotton, and from the emerging cotton industries of France, Germany and Japan. Despite increasing worldwide demand for cotton, production in the United States was increasing only slowly, as almost all the land suitable for cotton was already in use for its cultivation and, in years when the domestic crop was low, it was largely used at home, with little being exported. World demand for raw cotton exceeded supply and Lancashire mills, which were highly dependent on United States raw cotton, were concerned about their future as their continued supply was dependent on market conditions and open to speculative manipulation. In 1901, a committee was appointed to investigate the establishment new cotton growing areas in British colonies, dependencies and protectorates.

=== Formation ===
Following the committee's recommendation, the British Cotton Growing Association (BCGA), aiming to promote growing suitable grades of cotton within the British Empire, was founded in February 1902. The association was composed of manufacturers, merchants, shippers and representatives of the various industries and trades unions connected with the cotton industry in Lancashire. It was organised as a semi-philanthropic body, using subscriptions from those involved in the cotton industry to distribute seed and provide technical expertise at no cost to the beneficiaries in order to develop cotton-growing, without any direct or immediate benefit to the subscribers. The association was at first given financial support by the British government, but in 1915 subsidy was withdrawn and, in 1917, the Empire Cotton Growing Committee was established to take over some of its responsibilities. This led to the association restricting its activities in several countries. However, the Cotton Industry Act 1923 empowered the Empire Cotton Growing Committee to collect a levy of sixpence for every 500 pounds on all raw cotton purchased by British spinners to support its own activities and, at its discretion, those of the British Cotton Growing Association.

The association was inaugurated with a guarantee fund of £50,000, and this was used to send consignments of seed and growing instructions to countries with potential to grow cotton and to dispatch cotton experts to undertake pioneering work and conduct experiments there. In 1904 the association was applied for, and was granted, a Royal Charter and its capital was increases to £500,000 to ensure adequate funding for the extension of its expanding operations.

=== Expansion ===
In its early days, the BCGA generally worked through the Colonial Office or officials in the colonies, but it soon realised that, to meet its objectives, it needed to do more than provide seed and expertise, so from 1920 it began to supply machinery and buildings, to finance cotton ginneries and to act as selling agent for the cotton crops at guaranteed prices. It worked principally in Africa, including the Sudan, Nigeria, the Gold Coast and other colonies in West Africa, Uganda and Kenya in East Africa, Nyasaland and the Rhodesias in Central Africa and Union of South Africa. It also operated in India, Iraq, Australia and the West Indies. The Association also encouraged British Government investment in infrastructure projects likely to benefit cotton production, such as roads, railways and irrigation works, including the Sennar Dam in the Sudan and the expansion of Nigerian Railways.

Although India was already established as a supplier of raw cotton, much of this was of the short-staple variety generally used for the coarse types of cotton cloth produced for the Indian domestic market and, while much existing African cotton production was also short-staple, the Association thought that the higher prices which high-quality long-staple cotton would command, and the absence of significant local cotton manufacturing, would convince African farmers to produce the long-staple variety that Lancashire required: this underestimated the demand of local manufacturers in some colonies. It also wished to have a wide range of sources of supply, rather than replacing dependence on the United States with over-reliance on India.

=== Operations ===
The Association initially planned to operate through plantations owned either by itself or by European planters and companies. It was advised against this policy by many colonial officials, particularly in areas where cotton was already grown. However, at least ten private cotton plantation companies were floated, mainly in West Africa, between 1902 and 1914: all failed through poor planning, insufficient capital or lack of agricultural experience. The cost of supporting private firms that failed to create viable plantations also convinced the Association to rely on African producers. The Association paid African farmers at least market rates, and sometimes above-market rates, particularly after the First World War, when worldwide cotton prices slumped, to ensure growers did not change to growing crops other than cotton. It also offered significant cash incentives for high-quality cotton and, as a result of these two policies, the Association frequently lost money on its cotton dealing.

In West Africa, the BCGA also faced the problem that growing cocoa, peanuts or tobacco could be more lucrative than cotton, in East Africa and Northern Nigeria that local cotton industries with limited transport costs offered comparable or better prices than Lancashire and that in much of Nyasaland and Uganda poor transport links increased costs to uneconomic levels. It was also prevented from operating in Egypt, which produced excellent long-staple cotton. In order to meet these challenges, the Association sought legislation by the colonial authorities to regulate the production and sale of cotton, aiming to promote exports at the expense of local sales.

=== Later history and legacy ===
In 1927 the Empire Cotton Growing Committee was replaced by the Empire Cotton Growing Corporation (later renamed the Cotton Research Corporation) as the main governmental agency supporting cotton production. This body took over most of the research work previously carried out the BCGA to improve the quality and yield of cotton grown. By this time, the Association had generally given up its role as buyer, because many colonies had established their own marketing boards. However, the Association continued as a consulting organisation and as a trade representational body.

There is little doubt that the Association was successful in promoting the growth of cotton, and particularly long-staple cotton, in the British African colonies and in the other colonies in which it operated in during the first quarter of the 20th century. In the same period. Lancashire's consumption of American cotton decreased significantly, whereas American cotton exports to Western Europe and elsewhere were relatively stable, suggesting its aim of securing alternative supplies was realised. However, the United States remained Britain's largest supplier, with the BCGA's colonial cotton supplying about 20% of cotton Lancashire used in 1918. This colonial supply was useful in ensuring that there were no shortages in years when the American crop was low or prices high, particularly as the range of sources made supplies less dependent on adverse conditions in one country. After attempts by brokers and speculators in the United States to restrict cotton exports and raise prices in 1902-03 and 1909–10, no significant further attempts were made to corner this market.

However, it is not clear how much of this increase in African cotton exports would have occurred without the Association's activities. One view is that, as the colonial administrations of several African territories lacked the financial resources to promote major agricultural change, priming the pump by the BCGA was necessary to bring about change, at least in the poorer countries. An alternative view is that the cost of the Association's operations may have been excessive for the benefit achieved, and its obsessive quest for new supplies may have been at the expense of adapting the industry to the new technologies emerging in that period.

== Comparison with other colonial states ==
In 1902 when the BCGA was formed, four other European states (France, Germany, Portugal and Belgium) each had domestic textile industries and African colonies, and each attempted to grow cotton in those colonies to reduce dependence of imported cotton. Although France and, for a short time, Portugal had organisations similar to the BCGA, these never exercised as much influence over colonial production as the BGCA did. Germany and Portugal initially concentrated on plantation production rather than peasant cotton growing and, in all four countries, the colonial administrations had more direct control than in British colonies where the BCGA operated and used more coercion. After the BCGA ceased its development operations in 1927, British colonial administrations assumed greater control over their cotton production.

=== France ===
The French textile industry was even more dependent than Britain's on United States cotton, with over 90% of its supplies from that source at the end of the 19th century. Although cotton had been produced for centuries in West Africa, it was not grown intensively and yields were low. Attempts were made to improve the quantity and also the quality of cotton produced in the late 19th century, but the first sustained effort began in 1903 when the Association Cotonniere Coloniale (ACC), composed of French cotton manufacturers, began to supply seeds and technical advice: unlike the BCGA, the ACC did not market raw cotton and built only a few ginneries. The colonial administration did not favour of European-owned plantations but instituted a policy of forcing African producers to grow cotton and to sell it in controlled markets. However, the efforts of the ACC largely ceased by 1915, and supplies of African cotton dwindled.

After the First World War, the ACC was solely as a lobbying body for manufactures in France. Cotton production in the six main French cotton-producing colonies: Burkina Faso, (formerly Haute-Volta), Chad, Mali (formerly Soudan Français), the Ivory Coast, Benin (formerly Dahomey) and Cameroon) was developed by cooperation between the French Administration and a French public company, Compagnie française pour le développement des fibres textiles (CFDT). Its two main problems were the unsuitability of much of French West Africa for cotton production without irrigation, and competition from local textile industries. Where cotton could be grown successfully, the local administrators resorted to compelling local producers to grow cotton and sell it to the CFDT at low prices up to 1931. This was counterproductive, and French Africa only supplied about 7% of the cotton that metropolitan France required.

=== Germany ===
The German Kolonial-Wirtschaftliches Komitee (KWK), or Colonial Economic Committee, was set up in 1896. From the outset, it was dominated by textile manufacturers seeking raw materials and, from 1902, it directed plans for economic development in German African colonies, effectively as an agent of the German Government. Its main aim was to increase colonial cotton production, although it also attempted other projects to increase raw material supplies. The main KWK project was in Togo, where cotton was produced on European owned plantations between 1904 and 1909. However, much of this cotton was low-grade and the attempt was later ended. Colonial cotton production never met more than a small fraction of German needs.

One of the main problems the KWK had is that it initially conscripted African labour to work on plantations, both in Togo and German East Africa. In Togo, this led to large-scale migration to adjacent British and French colonies to escape forced labour, and in German East Africa it was an important factor leading to the Maji-Maji uprising of 1905, after which plantation production there was abandoned there, followed a few years later by it ceasing in Togo.

=== Portugal ===
Efforts to promote cotton growing in Angola and Mozambique began in the mid-19th century, mainly through plantations, but cotton only became an important product at the start of the 20th century, when Portugal's growing textiles industry became dependent on imported cotton. A number of plantation companies experimented with cotton, but it was only when the colonial government in Mozambique followed the British example and turned to peasant production in 1906, followed by Angola in 1907, that significant amounts were produced, particularly in and just after the First World War. In both colonies, Africans were obliged to plant cotton, but had to sell this to European traders for export at a guaranteed but low price.

Most development, including the provision of free seeds and arranging transport, was promoted by colonial governors, as an organisation modelled on the BCGA only existed for a few years and did not undertake these tasks. Frequent changes of government before 1926 prevented consistent policies being applied, and Angola and Mozambique only produced around 5% of the cotton Portugal's textiles industry required, until the establishment of the Estado Novo, which introduced increasingly brutal coercion from its inception in 1926, and particularly after 1938.

=== Belgium ===
The Congo Free State which gained international recognition in 1885, granted large concessions to private companies and, until the rights to these concessions were rescinded when the Belgian Government annexed its territory as the Belgian Congo in 1908, Congolese people were debarred from activities other than subsistence agriculture. Few of the concessionaires had initiated cotton growing, but in 1917 a requirement to produce saleable crops was imposed on Africans, including the growing of varieties of cotton suitable for the Belgian textile industry. Initially, the administration sought to promote peasant cotton growing through incentives but, from 1921, it gave twelve Belgian companies the exclusive right to purchase cotton in a defined area and, in practice, a labour monopoly in those areas. Further grants were made in later years. Cotton growers in these areas were forced to grow cotton and sell it to the designated company at a price determined by negotiation between the administration and the companies. Until this system was reformed in the mid1930s, it only produced moderate amounts of often low-grade cotton and impoverished the coerced growers.

== Operations by territory ==
=== Sudan ===
Initially, the BCGA was not interested in the Sudan, largely because an agreement with Egypt limited the amount of water the Sudan could abstract from the River Nile for irrigation. An agreement of 1912 between the Egyptian and Sudanese governments allowed the latter greater freedom to use the waters of the Blue Nile for irrigation and, from 1915, the Association began to import Sudanese cotton and sell it to Lancashire mills. However, it was only after the British Government advanced funds for large-scale irrigation in the Gezira region that substantial cotton production was possible. As most of the land in Gezira belonged to its indigenous population, the colonial Sudanese Government devised a scheme under which owners whose land was to be irrigated were required to lease it to the government for 40 years at a fixed rent, receiving also the right to cultivate that land in an approved manner, namely to grow cotton. From 1921, this became the basis of land tenure in the Gezira Scheme, the area of which was greatly increased when the Sennar Dam was completed in 1925. A smaller irrigation scheme also operated in Kassala province.

Unlike the rest of Africa where plantations had either not been or abandoned, in the Sudan, the “Syndicate” system operated: a type of plantation where native producers entered into a form of partnership with the Sudan Plantations Syndicate Limited, which had received a concession from the Sudan government. Under this, the Sudanese farmer received 40% of the sales price of his crop, the government that granted the concession and provided irrigation water received 35% and the company, responsible for general management and supervision, ploughing the land and ginning the cotton had the balance of 25%. Once the Gezira Scheme became fully operational in 1925, cotton became the principal export of the Sudan, reaching a high point in 1929 before the Great Depression

=== West Africa ===
The BCGA saw West Africa as a suitable area for commercial cotton growing, particularly in Nigeria. The Gambia and Sierra Leone, although having suitable climate and soils, were heavily involved in growing peanuts and, in parts of the Gold Coast, the mining industry was the main employers. In general, the Association favoured production by African farmers, but in Sierra Leone and Ibadan it experimented with plantations. Although cotton production prospered in some areas, the Sierra Leone plantations failed and the lack of rail connections in other areas and high cost of sea transport from West Africa depressed producer prices. From 1902, some attempts were made to encourage cotton growing in the River Volta region of the Gold Coast, but efforts to grow Egyptian cotton failed and American Upland Cotton was only moderately successful. The Association's efforts in the Gold Coast ceased by 1912.

=== Nigeria ===
Cotton, particularly in Northern Nigeria, was either rain-grown or an irrigated crop long before the colonial period. The BCGA made an agreement with the Nigerian Government in 1904 to establish model farms and a research station, build ginneries and provide suitable seeds and experts to improve the quality and quantity of the crop. Initially, yields were small and transport, except were farms were near major rivers or railways, was difficult. Cotton growing was not popular in areas where cocoa, oil palms or peanuts were grown and, in 1910 the Association's research station was closed, so by 1914 the future for cotton looked uncertain. In the Kano region, the Association's was disappointed because the local cotton industry paid as much or more to local farmers as it did, until the railway arrived there in 1912 and cut transport costs.

However, a boost in prices caused by the First World War, the Association's introduction of high-quality varieties of seed and the promotion of cotton in areas irrigated by the annual rise of Lake Chad improved yields and prices. The Association also instituted a series of certified cotton markets in 1921, where certification by its trained graders was required for the cotton to be accepted at Association ginneries. Until 1923, it also agreed to purchase all certified cotton at a price fixed six months in advance to give growers certainty, but it withdrew this guarantee as world prices recovered from a post-war slump.

=== Uganda and Kenya ===
In 1902, the BCGA turned to Uganda as a suitable area for growing cotton, as it possessed a favourable climate and fertile soils. A high-grade long-staple cotton was introduced and, as production increased cotton become Uganda's most important cash crop. Cotton was initially planted in Buganda and extended to the Bunyoro, Busoga and Ankole districts in 1905. Ugandan cotton production increased rapidly until 1912, aided by a degree of coercion applied from 1908 onward. The cotton producers were then hit by fluctuating world prices and disruption caused by the First World War and many in areas with poor transport links ceased growing the crop. The Association made strenuous efforts to promote the growing of cotton in the First World War, with some success. However, after 1918, it faced strong competition from Indian traders and a significant part of the Ugandan crop was sold to India rather than Britain, as transport costs to India were lower.

Cotton found less favour in Kenya, although the association attempted to introduce it in 1906, mainly near Lake Victoria and in coastal districts. In 1914, the Association withdrew from Kenya, although its former operations there were transferred on by the British East Africa Corporation.

=== Nyasaland ===
From 1903, the BCGA promoted the growing of Egyptian cotton by African farmers in the Lower Shire River valley and along the shores of Lake Nyasa. This type was unsuitable for highland areas but a variety of Upland cotton was developed for the Shire Highlands. Initially, the Association's main input was the provision of free reliable seed to local farmers, but it later provided advice on cultivation and, in 1910, it built a ginnery and purchased part of the cotton crop. Also in 1910, the colonial administration made rules limiting who could issue seed to or purchase cotton from African farmers, creating a virtual monopoly for the Association. Although European planters growing cotton were not covered by these rules, many used the Association to purchase their cotton. After a boom in sales at the start of the First World War, discontinuance of a British Government grant in 1916 caused the association to cease operations in areas where transport was difficult, and disastrous floods in the Lower Shire in 1918, were good transport links existed, severely hit production there. A post-war slump in cotton prices convinced most European planters, and many African farmers outside the Lower Shire valley to cease growing cotton but, after 1924, production by African growers in the Lower Shire revived.

=== Northern and Southern Rhodesia ===
The BCGA's interest in both sections of colonial Rhodesia was minor, as much of these territories was climatically unsuitable for cotton growing, and there were alternative employment opportunities to growing cotton for their African populations.

Small amounts of cotton were grown in the Zambezi valley in Southern Rhodesia and the Association saw this as a promising area to develop production by distributing suitable seed from 1904 on. However, results were unfavourable before the First World War, as peasant farmers made more money selling maize or other foods. A wartime increase in the cotton price, intensive promotion of cotton and a further price increase in the mid-1920s caused more African farmers to turn to cotton, although white farmers expressed concern about African labour shortages on their farms. From the 1930s, cotton growing suffered from low prices and being restricted to areas considered unsuitable for tobacco growing or cattle herding, so it never realised the Association's earlier expectations.

The BCGA experimented with cotton growing in the areas of North-Eastern Rhodesia close to the Nyasaland border from 1908. Upland cotton of good quality could be grown there, but lack of economic transport made the cost of production excessive. The withdrawal of government support to the Association and decline in cotton prices after the First World War ended its interest in that area.

=== South Africa ===
The BCGA set-up an experimental cotton farm in the Tzaneen area near the Limpopo in 1903 and, a cotton gin was installed there in 1905. In 1913, in cooperation with the Department of Agriculture, further experimental sites for cotton were established at Rustenburg and at Barberton. These with Tzaneen became the three main centres of cotton production, all in the Transvaal. However, cotton was never of more than local important in the country until the 1930s.

=== Iraq ===
In 1920, Iraq became a League of Nations mandate under British control. The BCGA established that soil and climatic conditions are suitable for growing cotton, but only with irrigation and better transport facilities. However, the high cost of implementing infrastructure improvements prevented significant commercial production there.

=== West Indies ===
The BCGA introduced cotton growing into the West Indies and British Guiana in 1903. The bulk of the crop grown was Sea Island cotton of very fine quality, but the quantities grown were small.

=== Other countries ===
The BCGA investigated cotton growing in Queensland Australia between 1904 and 1908 and again in 1911, but considered that the high cost of labour would prevent commercially successful operations. After German East Africa was occupied by British forces in late 1918, and before it was formally mandated to Britain as Tanganyika (territory), the Association was given the task of promoting cotton production, including guaranteeing prices, arranging transport and building new ginneries. However, it was already stretched and unable to devote sufficient resources to carry this out effectively and was replaced by the Empire Cotton Growing Corporation.

== Archives ==
Archives of the British Cotton Growing Association are held at the Cadbury Research Library, University of Birmingham.

== Sources ==
- D. M. Anderson, (2000). Uganda Cotton. The Journal of African History, Vol. 41, No. 2, pp. 322–333.
- L. Bader, (1927). British Colonial Competition for the American Cotton Belt. Economic Geography, Vol. 3, No. 2 pp. 210–231.
- W. H. B Court, (1965). British Economic History, 1870 – 1914, Cambridge University Press.
- C. Delpeuch, (2009). A Short Analytical History of Cotton institutions in West Africa, GEM Working Paper, Paris, Groupe d'Economie Mondiale.
- E de C Duggan, (1922). The Cotton Growing Industry of Nigeria, Journal of the Royal African Society, Vol. 21, No. 83, pp. 205–6.
- E de C Duggan, (1926). The Cotton Prospects of Northern Nigeria, Journal of the Royal African Society, Vol. 26, No. 101, pp. 10–20.
- R. E. Dumett, (1975). Obstacles to Government-Assisted Agricultural Development in West Africa: Cotton-Growing Experimentation in Ghana in the Early Twentieth Century. The Agricultural History Review, Vol. 23, No. 2, pp. 156–172.
- C. M. Elliott, (2006). Agrarian Change and Economic Development in Africa: Theory and Experience 1880–1914, in E.L Jones and S. J. Woolf (editors) Agrarian Change and Economic Development: The Historical Problems, London Routledge, ISBN 0-415-37696-3.
- T. Hentzel, (2007). Australian Agriculture: Its History and Challenges. Canberra, CISRO publications, ISBN 978-0-64399-342-6.
- W. H. Himbury, (1918). Empire Cotton. Journal of the Royal African Society, Vol. 17, No. 68, pp 262–275.
- J. Arthur Hutton, (1904). The Work of the British Cotton-Growing Association. The North American Review, Vol. 178, No. 570, pp. 742–750.
- M. O. Ijere, (1974). Colonial Policy in Nigerian Agriculture and Its Implementation. Agricultural History, Vol. 48, No. 2, pp. 298–304.
- A Isaacman, (1992). “Coercion, Paternalism and the Labour Process: the Mozambique Cotton Regime 1938-1961”. Journal of Southern African Studies Vol. 18 No. 3, pp. 487–526.
- J. C. B. Kabissa, (2015) Cotton Production in Tanzania: Breaking the Jinx. Bukoba, Tanzania Educational Publishers, ISBN 978-9-98707-007-7.
- A. J. Knoll and H. J. Hiery, (2010). The German Colonial Experience. Lanham, University Press of America, ISBN 978-0-76183-900-2.
- O. Likaka, (1997). Rural Society and Cotton in Colonial Zaire. Madison, University of Wisconsin Press, ISBN 0-299-15334-7.
- S. Mollan, (2008). Business, State and Economy: Cotton and the Anglo-Egyptian Sudan, 1919–1939. African Economic History, Vol. 36 pp. 95–123.
- P. S. Nyambara, (2000). Colonial Policy and Peasant Cotton Agriculture in Southern Rhodesia, 1904–1953. The International Journal of African Historical Studies, Vol. 33, No. 1, pp. 81–111.
- P. F. B. Nayenga, (1981). Commercial Cotton Growing in Busoga District, Uganda, 1905–1923. African Economic History, No. 10, pp. 175–195.
- K. D. Nworah, (1971). The West African Operations of the British Cotton Growing Association, 1904–1914. African Historical Studies, Vol. 4, No. 2, pp. 31–330.
- S. Onyeiwu, (2000). Deceived by African Cotton: The British Cotton Growing Association and the Demise of the Lancashire Textile Industry. African Economic History, No. 28, pp. 89–121.
- G.G. Parker, (1952). British Policy and Native Agriculture in Kenya and Uganda, Agricultural History, Vol. 26, No. 4, pp. 125–131
- M. A. Pitcher, (1991). “Sowing the seeds of failure”: Early Portuguese Cotton Cultivation in Angola and Mozambique 1820-1926” Journal of Southern African Studies Vol. 17 No. 1, pp. 43–70.
- J. Robbins, (2009). “The Black Man’s Crop”: Cotton, Imperialism and Public-Private Development in Britain's African Colonies, 1900–1918. Commodities of the Empire Working Paper No.11.
- J. Robbins, (2015). Lancashire and the “Undeveloped Estates”: The British Cotton Growing Association Fund-Raising Campaign, 1902–1914. Journal of British Studies, Vol. 54 No.4 pp. 869–897.
- R. Roberts, (1987). French Colonialism, Imported Technology, and the Handicraft Textile Industry in the Western Sudan, 1898–1918. The Journal of Economic History, Vol. 47, No. 2, pp. 461–472.
- M. B. Rose (2000). Firms, Networks and Business Values: The British and American Cotton Industries since 1750. Cambridge University Press, ISBN 0-521-78255-4.
- S. Serels, (2007). Political Landscaping: Land Registration, the Definition of Ownership and the Evolution of Colonial Objectives in the Anglo-Egyptian Sudan, 1899–1924. African Economic History, No. 35, pp. 59–75.
- W. D. Smith, (1978). The German Colonial Empire. Chapel Hill, University of North Carolina Press, ISBN 0-807-81322-2.
- N. Swainson, (1980).The Development of Corporate Capitalism in Kenya, 1918–77. Berkeley, University of California Press, ISBN 0-520-04019-8.
- C. C. Taylor, (1935) Agriculture in South Africa. Washington, US Department of Agriculture Technical Bulletin 466.
- P. T. Terry, (1962). The Rise of the African Cotton Industry in Nyasaland], 1902 to 1918. The Nyasaland Journal, Vol. 15, No. 1, pp 59–71.
- University of Birmingham. Records of the British Cotton Growing Association.
- World Bank, (1995). Cotton Production Prospects for the Next Decade, Technical Paper 287, Washington.
