= George Barker (Cambridge University cricketer) =

English cricketer

George Barker (25 May 1819 – 13 October 1893) was an English first-class cricketer who played for Cambridge University.

Barker was born in Shipdham, Norfolk, and was educated at Bury St Edmunds and Trinity College, Cambridge. He was awarded a cricket blue, appearing for Cambridge University in three first-class matches in 1840. He died in Great Yarmouth.
