= Walthamstow School of Art =

Former art school in Walthamstow, England

Coordinates: 51.577953°N 0.016485°W

Walthamstow School of Art was an art school based in Walthamstow, north-east London. It eventually became part of Waltham Forest College.

In 1883, an art school was created by the Walthamstow Literary Institute. It was initially based at the Trinity School, in West Avenue, which was connected with the Science and Art Department, in South Kensington. In 1892, it relocated to Grosvenor House, Hoe Street, and then to Court House, Hoe Street, in 1900. Administration was taken over by the Walthamstow Higher Education Committee in 1906. It was closed in 1915.
