= Maurice Barker (cricketer) =

English cricketer

Personal information
- Full name: Maurice Percy Barker
- Born: 4 February 1917; Leamington Spa, Warwickshire, England
- Died: 6 September 2000 (aged 83); Hereford, Herefordshire, England
- Height: 6 ft 4 in (1.93 m)
- Batting: Right-handed
- Bowling: Right-arm fast-medium
- Role: Opening bowler

Domestic team information
- Years: Team
- 1946: Warwickshire
- First-class debut: 18 May 1946 Warwickshire v Sussex
- Last First-class: 22 August 1946 Warwickshire v Essex

Career statistics
Competition	First-class
Matches	5
Runs scored	55
Batting average	7.85
100s/50s	–/–
Top score	17
Balls bowled	819
Wickets	16
Bowling average	23.62
5 wickets in innings	1
10 wickets in match	–
Best bowling	7/68
Catches/stumpings	1/–
- Source: CricketArchive, 6 March 2014

Maurice Percy Barker (4 February 1917 – 6 September 2000) was an English cricketer who played first-class cricket for Warwickshire in five matches in 1946. He was a right-handed tail-end batsman and a right-arm fast-medium bowler. He was born at Leamington Spa in Warwickshire and died at Hereford.

Barker played some matches for Warwickshire's Club and Ground team against club sides in the 1930s, and also appeared in wartime matches for the British Empire XI against club sides. But his first-class cricket career was restricted by his career in the police to a handful of matches in the 1946 season when, according to Wisden Cricketers' Almanack, he "showed promise" as a 6 ft 4in fast bowler. In the match against Yorkshire in June 1946, with both sides weakened by absences for the Test Trial match, he took seven wickets for 68 runs in Yorkshire's only innings. For the 1947 season, Warwickshire recruited the New Zealand fast bowler Tom Pritchard and although Barker played a few times for the second eleven in that season, he did not appear again in first-class cricket.
