= William Higgs Barker =

English Hebraist

William Higgs Barker (1743–1816) was an English Hebraist.

== Life ==
Barker was of the same family as the Hebraist Samuel Barker, and son of George Barker, tailor, of Great Russell Street, London. He was admitted on the foundation of St. Paul's School, London 10 May 1756, aged twelve. He became Pauline Exhibitioner at Trinity College, Cambridge in 1761, Perry Exhibitioner 1764–7, and took his degree of B.A. in 1765. He was also a fellow of Dulwich College, Surrey, and took holy orders.

He was elected master of Queen Elizabeth's Grammar School at Carmarthen 22 July 1767, an office which he held for the rest of his life. He was also rector of Bleddfa from 1793.

== Works ==
He published a short work, entitled 'Grammar of the Hebrew Language adapted to the use of schools, with Biblical examples,’ 1774; and a 'Hebrew and English Lexicon,’ 1812.
