= Stochastic Drift (album) =

Studio album by Barker
- Released: April 3, 2025
- Genre: Electronic; IDM
- Length: 43:18
- Label: Smalltown Supersound
- Producer: Sam Barker

Barker chronology
Unfixed (2023)	Stochastic Drift (2025)

Singles from Stochastic Drift
- 1. "Reframing" Released: February 2, 2025

Stochastic Drift is the second studio album by British record producer Barker. It was released on April 3, 2025, through Smalltown Supersound. With no guest appearances, the EP's production was entirely handled by Barker himself. Featuring eight songs, the album received critical reception from multiple publications, including AllMusic and Pitchfork. In the UK, the album charted and peaked at top twenty on different charts. The album was supported by one single "Reframing". The project serves as a follow-up to Barker's 2019 album Utility.

== Background and release ==
Stochastic Drift was released on April 3, 2025, through Smalltown Supersound. The album was supported by one single "Reframing". Upon release, the album was commercially successful, charting at the top twenty of multiple charts.

== Critical reception ==
Professional ratings
Aggregate scores
Source	Rating
Metacritic	85/100
Review scores
Source	Rating
AllMusic	4/5 stars
Mojo	4/5 stars
Pitchfork	8.6/10

Stochastic Drift received a score of 85 out of 100 on the review aggregator Metacritic based on five critics' reviews, indicating "universal acclaim". Harry Tafoya writing for Pitchfork gave it an 8.6 out of 10, describing the record as a "synthesis", discussing that Barker navigates extremes, touching between chaos and mediated technology. AllMusic's Paul Simpson wrote the album "sounds like it has a live drummer playing along to Barker's rippling electronics, and the way the sounds bounce off of each other feels vibrant and ecstatic. The entire album is yet another exciting evolution of Barker's innovative approach to techno."

== Track listing ==
All tracks are written by Barker.

No.	Title	Length
1.	"Force of Habit"	6:18
2.	"Reframing"	4:00
3.	"Difference and Repetition"	4:24
4.	"The Remembering Self"	6:08
5.	"Positive Disintegration"	5:35
6.	"Cosmic Microwave"	5:37
7.	"Fluid Mechanics"	4:49
8.	"Stochastic Drift"	6:27
Total length:		43:18

== Charts ==
Chart (2025)	Peak position
UK Album Downloads (OCC)	17
UK Independent Albums (OCC)	41
UK Independent Album Breakers (OCC)	15
