= Robert Barker =

Robert Barker may refer to:

== Politicians ==
- Robert Barker (MP for Ipswich) (died 1571), English MP for Ipswich
- Robert Barker (MP for Thetford), English MP for Thetford
- Robert Barker (MP for Colchester) (1563–1618), English MP for Colchester
- Robert Barker (died 1618), English MP for Ipswich
- Sir Robert Barker, 1st Baronet (1732–1789), British Army officer and politician
- Robert Hewitt Barker (1887–1961), British businessman and politician
- Robert L. Barker (1933/4–2010), North Carolina State Senator

== Other people ==
- Robert Barker (footballer) (1847–1915), English footballer who played for England
- Robert Barker (painter) (1739–1806), English painter
- Robert Barker (physician) (died 1745), British physician and inventor
- Robert Barker (printer) (died 1645), English printer
- Robert Lee Barker (born 1937), American psychotherapist, author, editor, and professor of social work
- Bob Barker (1923–2023), American game show host
- Bootie Barker (born 1971), crew chief in the NASCAR Sprint Cup stock car racing series

== See also ==
- Bob Barker (disambiguation)
