= Thomas Henry Barker =

Secretary of Liverpool Chamber of Commerce

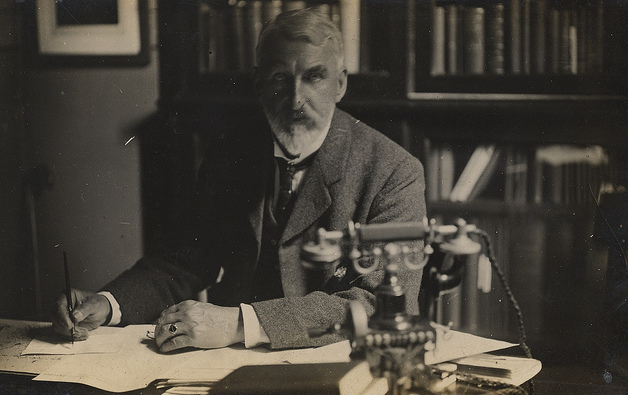
- c. 1910
- Born: May 18, 1841; Liverpool, United Kingdom
- Died: April 9, 1917 (aged 75); West Kirby, United Kingdom
- Burial place: Toxteth Park Cemetery
- Occupation: Secretary of the Liverpool Chamber of Commerce
- Years active: 1861–1912
- Parents: Charles Frederick Barker (father); Elizabeth Barker (née Hezelwood) (mother)

Thomas Henry Barker (18 May 1841 – 9 April 1917) was Secretary of the Liverpool Chamber of Commerce from 1884 to 1912. He was made Chevalier of the Order of Saint Anna for his services (along with those of Alfred Lewis Jones) to the duma during the Russian imperial visit to Cowes in 1909.

== Professional life ==
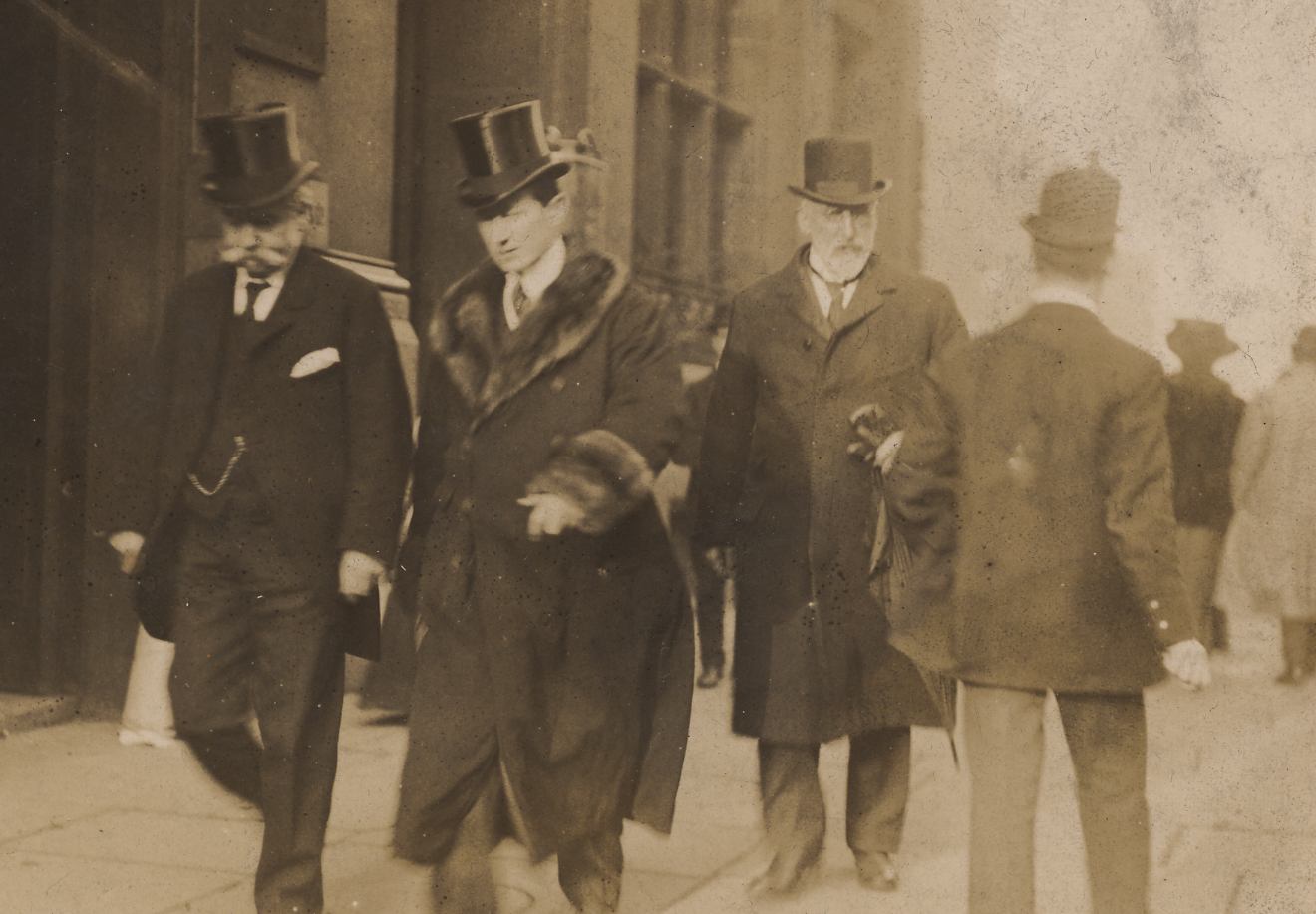
Barker in about 1900, walking behind Alfred Lewis Jones and Guglielmo Marconi.

Barker started his career in 1856 at the age of 16 as a clerk with James Baines & Co., owners of the Black Ball Line of ships (at the time one of the largest shipping companies in Liverpool). Later he moved to work for Reynold, Mann & Co., ship-owners and East India merchants, for whom he travelled extensively to America, Australia, and elsewhere.

After this he joined the Liverpool Chamber of Commerce as an assistant to William Blood, who was then Secretary of the Chamber. Blood retired in 1884, and Barker was appointed Secretary in his place, at the age of 43. The Chamber at this time was involved in negotiating around the trade in cotton, wheat, and iron with India, and Barker worked in this area in relation to the East Indian Railway Company, and lobbied for reductions in import tariffs to India. The Chamber's first 'Trade Section' or subcommittee (relating to the cotton trade) had been set up in 1882, and by the end of the 1890s had twenty-three such Sections — with Barker instrumental in much of their organisation.

West African trade was also of great importance to the Chamber around the time when Barker became Secretary, and he was involved along with Sir Alfred Jones in establishing the West African Trade Section.

Barker also was instrumental in forming the Tobacco Trade Section. "Tobacco had been previously warehoused at various Liverpool docks, which was highly inconvenient. On the formation of the Tobacco Section, however, representations were made to the Mersey Docks and Harbour Board which led to the creation of a warehouse at the Stanley Docks, capable of storing the entire stock of tobacco entering the port."

Towards the end of 1902 (following a visit to Liverpool by a British commercial agent from Moscow, H.A. Cooke) the Russian Trade Section was established, chaired by Hermann Decker and H. Clements. The following year, Cooke was sent to Siberia to make "inquiries on behalf of the Section", and a few months later Barker was sent (via Canada) to travel through Japan, Korea, China, and Russia, travelling on the Trans-Siberian Railway. In Beijing he met with de Lessar (the Russian Minister), after which he visited Shenyang and Harbin also in China. Then he travelled through Russia, visiting Irkutsk (and the Convict Settlement at Alexandrowski), then Tomsk and Omsk. The trip ended with a week in Moscow and St Petersburg, "where he was received by, amongst others, the British Minister (Sir Charles Scott), and Prince Khilkoff".

He became Russian Trade Organiser for the Chamber, and this led to him later helping during the Russian imperial visit to Cowes in 1909 for which he was awarded membership of the Order of Saint Anna.

Barker retired (after thirty-one years as Secretary) at the end of 1912, the year in which the Chamber had negotiated improvements to the Liverpool telephone network, alongside the General Post Office taking over UK telephone networks. (See also the photograph of Barker with Marconi at left.) During his time as Secretary he had been involved in many prominent people, such as Lord Halsbury, Lord Lansdowne, Winston Churchill, and the King of Siam.

== Personal life ==
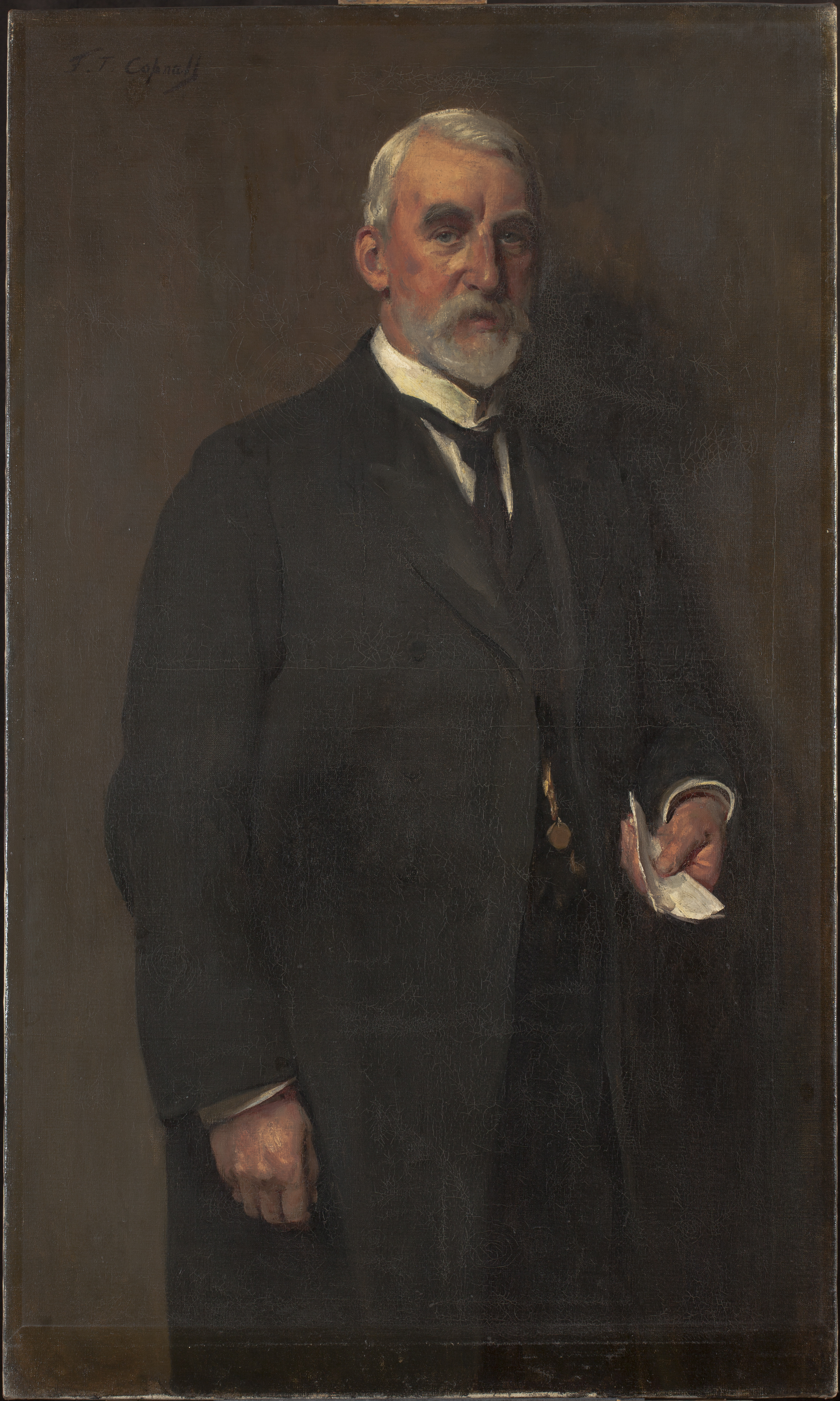
1906 portrait of Barker, by Frank Thomas Copnall (husband of Teresa Copnall).

Barker was born on 18 May 1841 at 9 Earle Street in Liverpool, the second son of Charles Frederick Barker and Elizabeth Barker (née Hezelwood), and he was baptised on 8 June 1841 at St Peter's Church, Liverpool. His siblings were Charles Frederick Barker (1838–1887), Elizabeth Barker (1838–1840) and Joseph Bolton Barker (1844–?).

Thomas Henry was living at 79 Canning Street, Liverpool in 1861 at the age of 19, with his mother Elizabeth (already a widow) and working as a ships' clerk. In the household were his brothers Joseph Bolton Barker (aged 16) and Charles N. Barker (aged 24, working as a mariner), and their aunt Isabella Hazelwood (aged 52).

On 25 August 1875 he married Mary Ellen Moulsdale in Walton, Liverpool.

Barker enjoyed travelling, and as well as visiting many different parts of the world in the course of his professional duties he also travelled for pleasure. In 1908 after the Conference of the Associated Chambers of Commerce in Montreal he went on a journey to Japan and China and returned to Liverpool via the Trans-Siberian Railway soon after it was opened.

In April 1906 (fifty years after starting his career) the members of the Liverpool Chamber of Commerce presented Barker with a large oil portrait of himself, which afterwards hung in the Chambers' offices and today is held by his descendants. Barker retired in 1912 and died five years later aged 75, in West Kirby.
