= Bob Barker Company =

American prison supply company

- Industry: Corrections
- Founded: 1972; 54 years ago in North Carolina, United States
- Founder: Robert Barker Sr.
- Headquarters: Fuquay-Varina, North Carolina, United States
- Key people: Robert Barker Sr. (Founder); Robert Barker Jr. (CEO); Nancy Barker Johns (Chief Operating Officer)
- Products: bedding, clothing, food service, footwear, laundry, personal care, recreation, security, medical supplies
- Website: www.bobbarker.com

Bob Barker Company, Inc. is an American company that sells supplies to prisons, jails, and other institutions. The company was founded in 1972, with headquarters in Fuquay-Varina, North Carolina, and a distribution and sales center in Ogden, Utah. Its products include prisoner and officer uniforms, bedding, toiletries, cleaning supplies and security and restraint equipment.

== History ==
According to the company's website, founder Bob Barker, a former newspaper editor from North Carolina, initially started the company selling supplies and equipment to restaurants. The company began supplying to jails and prisons in the southeastern United States in the early 1980s.

Since 1995, the company has been awarded at least $13 million in federal prison system contracts in the United States, representing about 100 federal prisons across the country. In 2016, the company began a $4.15 million distribution center expansion in Fuquay-Varina.

A 2008 report by SweatFree Communities, a campaign of the International Labor Rights Forum, alleged use of Bangladesh-based sweatshop labor by the company. Company president Robert Barker Jr. responded by stating the company only worked with suppliers that "share our commitment to the health and safety of those working in this industry."

In 2009, the company founded the philanthropic Bob Barker Company Foundation, with a focus on reducing recidivism.

While prison lore has suggested that the company is affiliated with game show host Bob Barker, there is no relationship between the two.
