= Edward Barker =

Edward Barker may refer to:

- Ed Barker (American football) (1931–2012), American football wide receiver
- Ed Barker (politician) (1935–2025), American politician from Georgia
- Edward Barker (cartoonist) (1950–1997), English cartoonist
- Edward Barker (MP) (died 1602), English ecclesiastical lawyer and Member of Parliament
- Edward John Barker (1799–1884), English physician who emigrated to Upper Canada
