= George Arthur Barker =

English composer (1812–1876)

George Arthur Barker (15 April 1812 – 2 March 1876) was an English song composer and tenor.

He was born in London and gained recognition as an opera singer and recitalist in both England and Scotland. He was also a prolific songwriter, his best-known songs including "The Irish Emigrant" (1846), "Scottish Blue Bells" (1846), and "White Squall" (1847). Many of his songs were issued in the ten-volume Song Albums, published from 1853, and his Songs of the Army and Navy (1855).

Barker died in Aylestone, Leicestershire, in 1876.
