= Kenneth Barker (cricketer) =

English cricketer

Kenneth Edgar Mylne Barker (27 October 1877 – 6 August 1938) was an English first-class cricketer active 1898–99 who played for Surrey and Cambridge University. He was born in Godstone; died in Blakeney, Norfolk.

During the First World War Barker was commissioned into the Cambridgeshire Regiment of the British Army.
