= Mickey Barker =

English footballer

Allan Michael Barker (born 23 February 1956) is an English former professional footballer.

A full back, he played for Newcastle United, Hartlepool United and Gillingham between 1973 and 1984.
