= Kenneth L. Barker =

American biblical scholar and academic

Kenneth Lee Barker (born 1931) is an American biblical scholar and professor of Old Testament and Hebrew. In addition to writing several books, he was also one of the original translators of the New American Standard Bible and the New International Version of the Bible.

Barker earned his B.A. from Northwestern College, his Th.M. from Dallas Theological Seminary (1960), and his Ph.D. from the Dropsie College for Hebrew and Cognate Learning (1969). He joined the faculty at Dallas in 1968 as professor of Old Testament, where he remained until 1981. In 1974, he was invited to join the Committee on Bible Translation, and later served as its secretary, as well as executive director of the International Bible Society's NIV Translation Center. He has also served as academic dean at Capital Bible Seminary.

Barker retired from the International Bible Society in 1996, and is currently living in Lewisville, Texas.

== Selected publications ==
- A comparative lexical and grammatical study of the Amarna Canaanisms and Canaanite vocabulary (1969)
- Micah in the New American Commentary (1998)
- Zechariah in the Expositor's Bible Commentary (1985)
- The NIV study Bible, New International Version, with Others (1985)
- The Accuracy of the NIV (1996) ISBN 0-8010-5639-X
- The Making of the NIV (1997) ISBN 0-8010-5742-6
